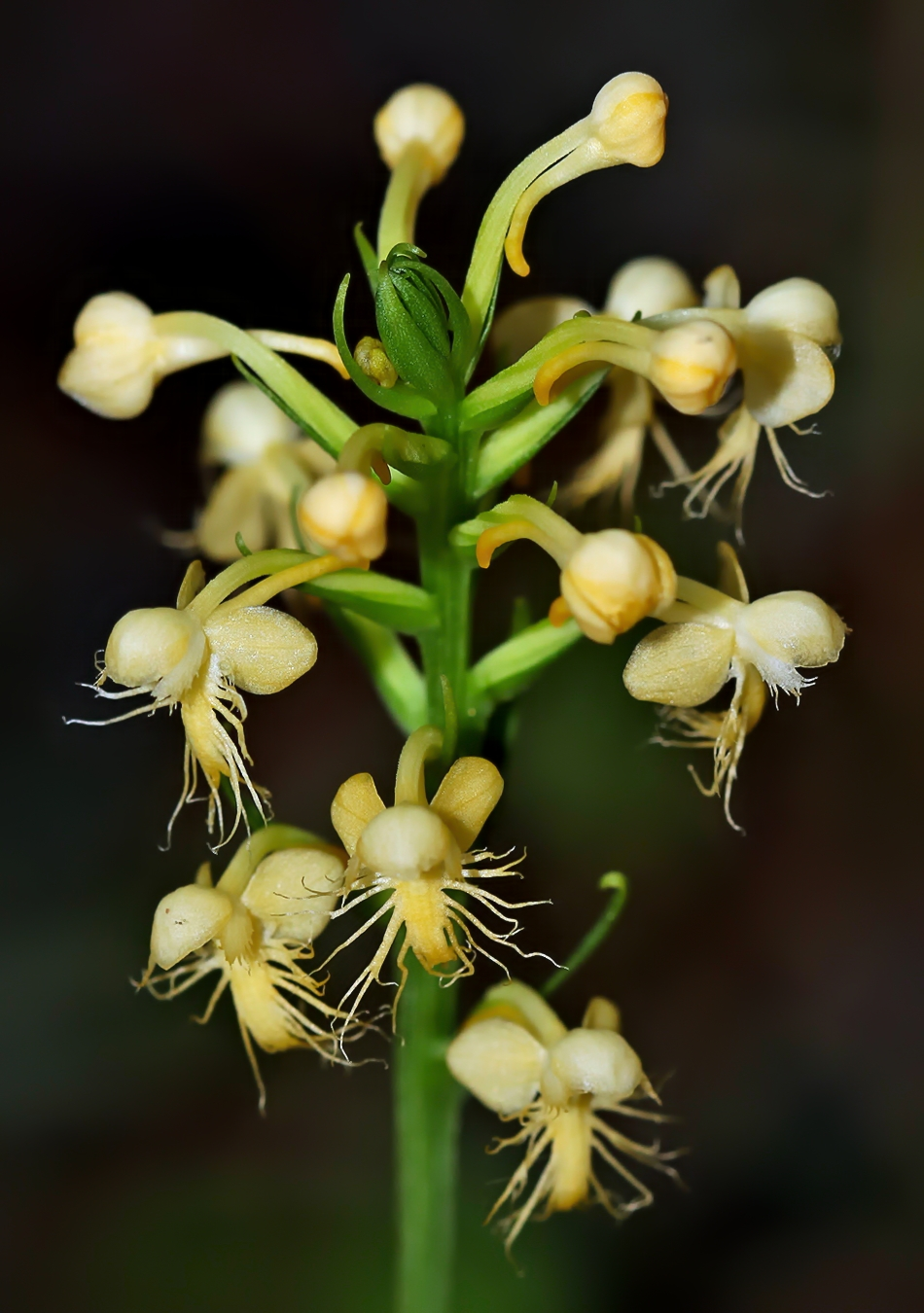

Scientific classification
- Kingdom: Plantae
- Clade: Tracheophytes
- Clade: Angiosperms
- Clade: Monocots
- Order: Asparagales
- Family: Orchidaceae
- Subfamily: Orchidoideae
- Genus: Platanthera
- Species: P. pallida

Binomial name
- Platanthera pallida P. M. Brown

= Platanthera pallida =

Pale fringed orchid

Species of orchid

Platanthera pallida, commonly known as pale fringed orchid, is a rare orchid of North America with the only known occurrences on Long Island. Locally, some enthusiasts prefer the alternative common name Long Island orchid.

== Description ==
Platanthera pallida plants are terrestrial orchids that look similar to Platanthera cristata - in fact before recognition as a species they were suspected to be variations or hybrids. They are 29-65 cm tall and have 2-3 lower leaves which are up to 25 cm long, as well as several reduced upper leaves. There are 24-80 flowers arranged in a raceme at the top of the stem, with a pale orange-yellow to pale cream color and a short nectar spur. Bloom time is in summer.

== Distribution and habitat ==
Platanthera pallida is endemic to Long Island in New York with only three known populations. It grows in dry areas between sand dunes.

== Taxonomy ==
Platanthera pallida was first described as a new species by P. M. Brown in 1992, when he examined plant populations that had been suspected to be variations or hybrids of Platanthera cristata. The USDA's plants database considers them identical to Platanthera × canbyi (the hybrid of Platanthera cristata with Platanthera blephariglottis). Future studies are likely to re-examine the current status as a separate species.
