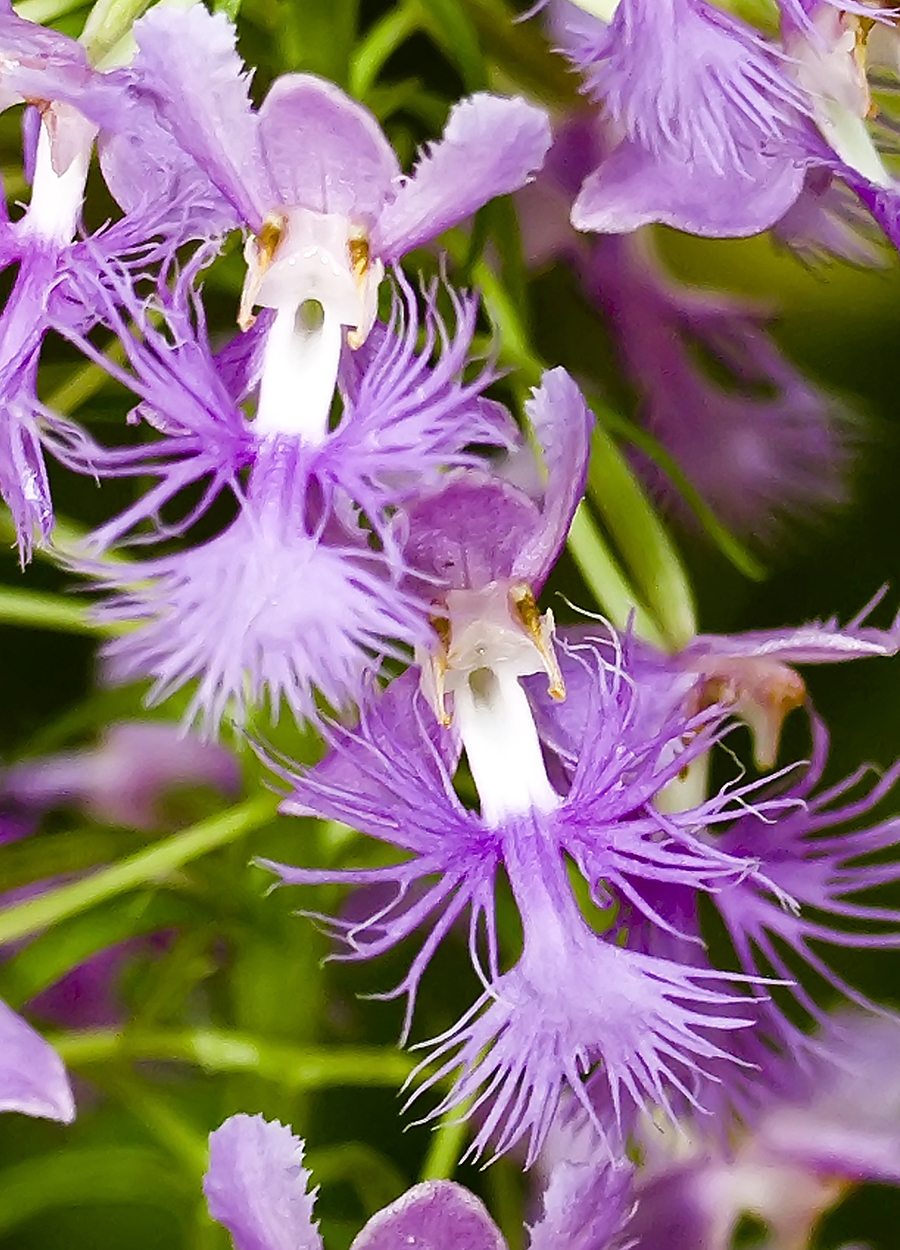
- Platanthera shriveri

Scientific classification
- Kingdom: Plantae
- Clade: Embryophytes
- Clade: Tracheophytes
- Clade: Angiosperms
- Clade: Monocots
- Order: Asparagales
- Family: Orchidaceae
- Subfamily: Orchidoideae
- Genus: Platanthera
- Species: P. shriveri

Binomial name
- Platanthera shriveri P.M.Br.

= Platanthera shriveri =

Shriver's purple fringed orchid

Species of orchid

Platanthera shriveri, Shriver's purple fringed orchid, is a rare orchid endemic to the United States. It is considered critically imperiled.

== Description ==
Platanthera shriveri plants look very similar to Platanthera grandiflora and a hybrid origin with Platanthera lacera is suspected. To distinguish Platanthera shriveri from Platanthera grandiflora, small morphological details and a different bloom time (July and August, about 3 weeks later) have to be observed.

== Distribution and habitat ==
The only known populations are in Maryland, North Carolina, Pennsylvania (historic record only), Virginia and West Virginia. They grow in woodlands and along stream banks.

== Taxonomy ==
Platanthera shriveri was described as a new species by P. M. Brown in 2008.

There is ongoing research whether the plants described as Platanthera shriveri are a separate botanical species or can be considered within the morphological and bloom time ranges of Platanthera grandiflora.
