= P. sinica =

P. sinica may refer to:

- Platanthera sinica, an orchid species endemic to the Yunnan Province of China
- Pryeria sinica, the euonymus leaf notcher, a moth species native to Asia
