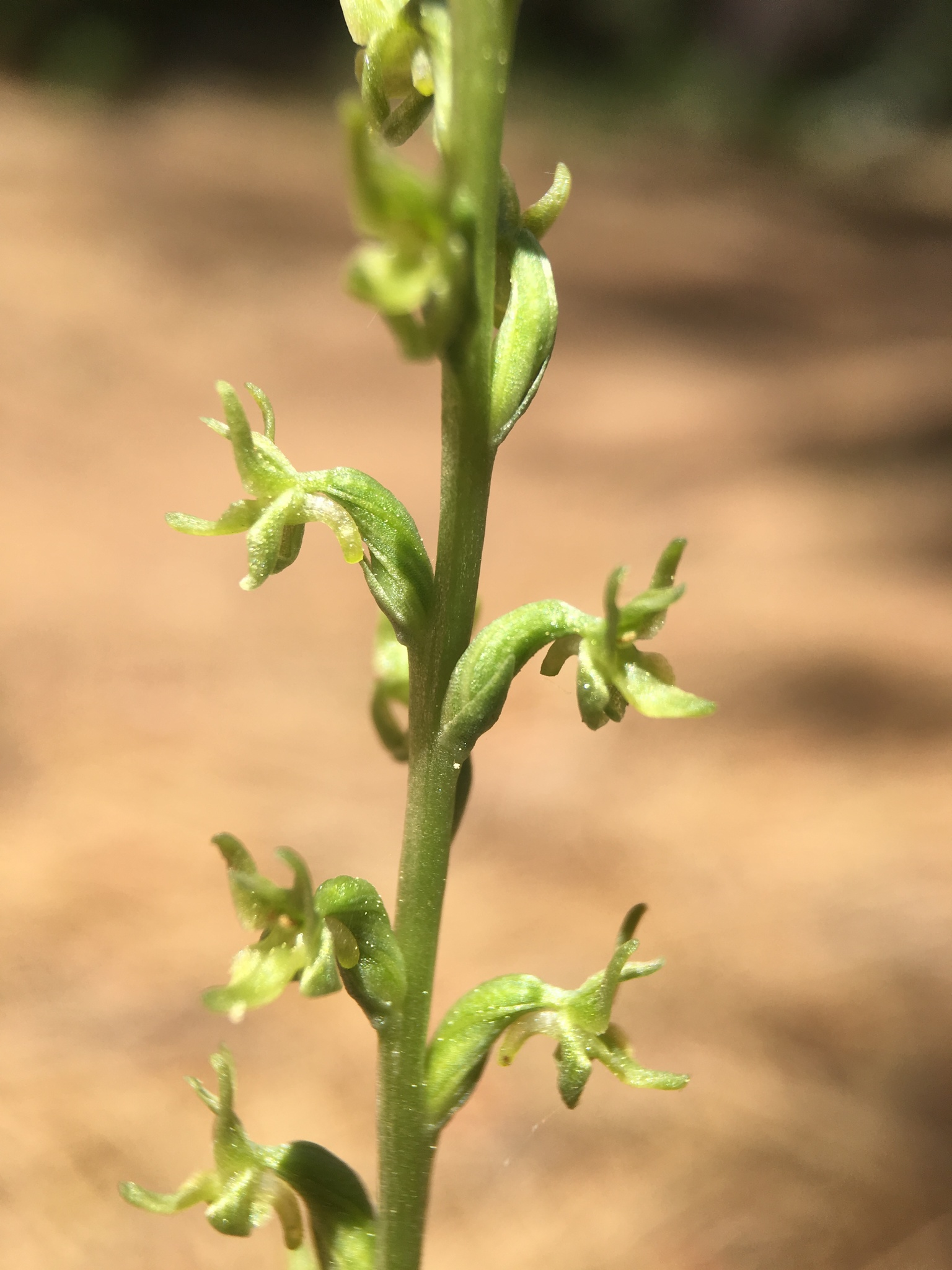

Conservation status
- Vulnerable (NatureServe)

Scientific classification
- Kingdom: Plantae
- Clade: Tracheophytes
- Clade: Angiosperms
- Clade: Monocots
- Order: Asparagales
- Family: Orchidaceae
- Subfamily: Orchidoideae
- Genus: Platanthera
- Species: P. colemanii

Binomial name
- Platanthera colemanii (Rand.Morgan & Glic.) R.M.Bateman

= Platanthera colemanii =

Species of plant

Platanthera colemanii is a rare species of orchid known by the common names Coleman's piperia and Coleman's rein orchid. It is endemic to California, where it is known from scattered occurrences along the Sierra Nevada and one disjunct location in Colusa County, California. It grows in coniferous forests and chaparral in deep sandy substrates. It was differentiated from the very similar Platanthera unalascensis in 1993.

It grows erect to about half a meter in maximum height. The basal leaves are narrow and almost grasslike, measuring up to 16 centimeters long and no more than 2 wide. Leaves higher on the stem are much reduced. The upper part of the stem is a spikelike inflorescence of up to 100 small flowers. The unscented translucent green flowers have curved sepals and sickle-shaped, curving petals a few millimeters in length. The flower can be distinguished from that of P. unalascensis by its shorter spur relative to its lip.

There are about 19 known occurrences, several of which are within Yosemite National Park. Other occurrences are in unprotected forested lands and may be vulnerable to disturbance from logging operations.
