= Platanthera bakeriana =

Scientific classification
- Kingdom: Plantae
- Clade: Tracheophytes
- Clade: Angiosperms
- Clade: Monocots
- Order: Asparagales
- Family: Orchidaceae
- Subfamily: Orchidoideae
- Genus: Platanthera
- Species: P. bakeriana

Binomial name
- Platanthera bakeriana (King & Pantl.) Kraenzl.

Synonyms
- Habenaria bakeriana King & Pantl.; Habenaria chiloglossa Tang & F.T.Wang; Platanthera chiloglossa (Tang & F.T.Wang) K.Y.Lang; Platanthera lancilabris Schltr.; Platanthera longiglandula K.Y.Lang; Platanthera silaensis Hand.-Mazz.

Species of plant

Platanthera bakeriana is a species of flowering plant in the family Orchidaceae, native from Nepal to China and Myanmar. It was first described in 1896 as Habenaria bakeriana.

== Distribution ==
Platanthera bakeriana is native to Nepal, Tibet, the eastern Himalayas, south-central China (western and southern Sichuan and northern Yunnan) and Myanmar.

== Conservation ==
Platanthera longiglandula was assessed as "vulnerable" in the 2004 IUCN Red List, where it is said to be native only to Sichuan in China. As of February 2023, P. longiglandula was regarded as a synonym of Platanthera bakeriana, which has a wider distribution.
