= Platanthera bhutanica =

Scientific classification
- Kingdom: Plantae
- Clade: Tracheophytes
- Clade: Angiosperms
- Clade: Monocots
- Order: Asparagales
- Family: Orchidaceae
- Subfamily: Orchidoideae
- Genus: Platanthera
- Species: P. bhutanica

Binomial name
- Platanthera bhutanica K.Inoue

Synonyms
- Habenaria platantheroides Tang & F.T.Wang; Platanthera curvata K.Y.Lang; Platanthera platantheroides K.Y.Lang

Species of plant

Platanthera bhutanica is a species of orchid native to South-central China, East Himalaya and Tibet.
