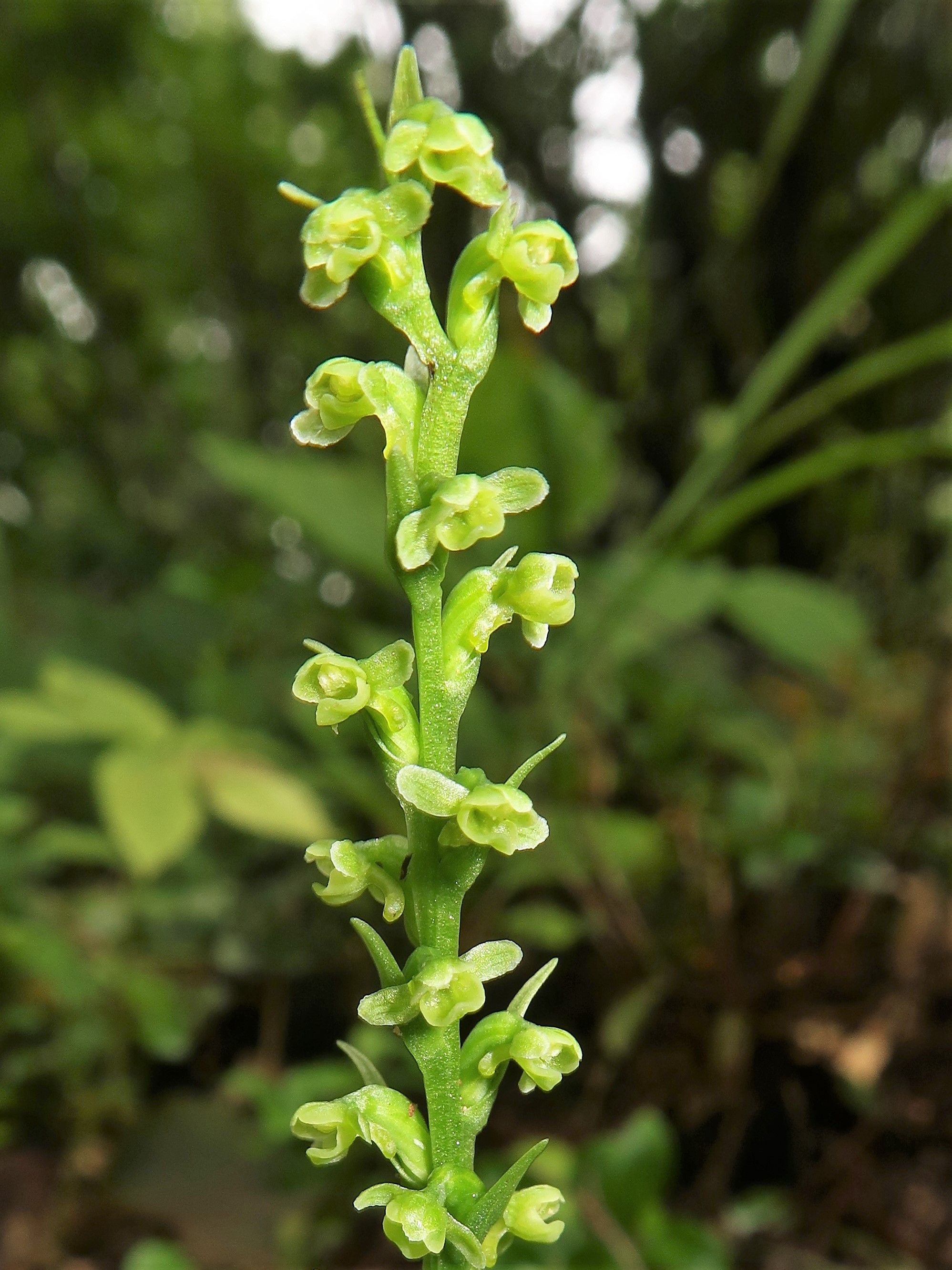

Scientific classification
- Kingdom: Plantae
- Clade: Tracheophytes
- Clade: Angiosperms
- Clade: Monocots
- Order: Asparagales
- Family: Orchidaceae
- Subfamily: Orchidoideae
- Genus: Platanthera
- Species: P. chorisiana

Binomial name
- Platanthera chorisiana (Cham.) Rchb.f.

= Platanthera chorisiana =

Chamisso's orchid

Species of orchid

Platanthera chorisiana, Chamisso's orchid or Choris' bog orchid, is a terrestrial orchid native to the United States, Canada, Russia and Japan.

== Description ==
Platanthera chorisiana plants are small, from 4 up to 20 cm. They usually have two leaves at the base of the stem (sometimes just one or up to four). The small flowers (petals are only 1.5-2.5 mm) have a greenish color and are often not fully turned (resupinate). There is a very short nectar spur. Bloom time is July and August.

== Subspecies ==
Sometimes two subspecies are considered, Platanthera chorisiana var. chorisiana and Platanthera chorisiana var. elata. The latter subspecies only grows in Asia.

== Distribution and habitat ==
In the United States Platanthera chorisiana is found in Washington (state) and Alaska, in Canada in British Columbia. Worldwide distribution is around the northern pacific coast, extending west along the Aleutian Islands to Kamchatka in Russia and to northern Japan.

Plants grow in bogs and wet tundra up to a maximum elevation of 400 m.

== Taxonomy ==
Platanthera chorisiana was first described by Adelbert von Chamisso in 1828 as Habenaria chorisiana.
