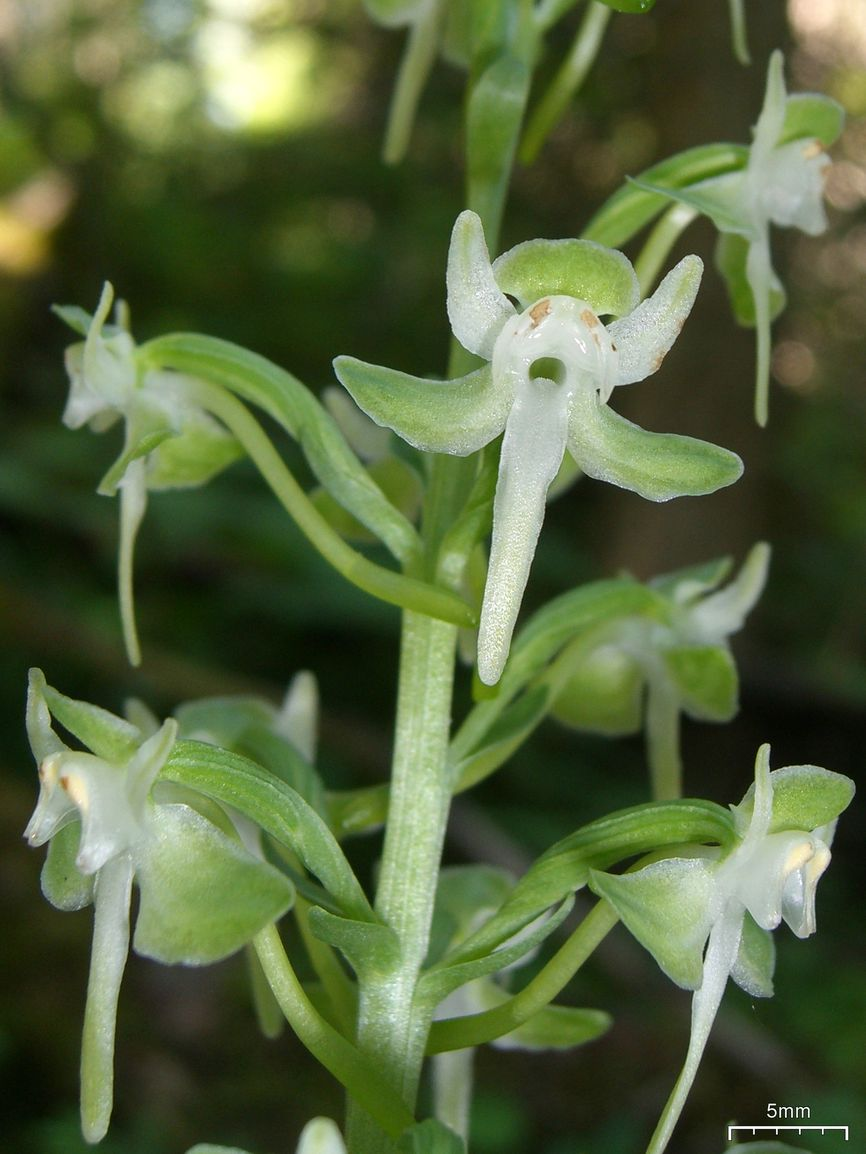
- Flowers of Platanthera orbiculata

Scientific classification
- Kingdom: Plantae
- Clade: Tracheophytes
- Clade: Angiosperms
- Clade: Monocots
- Order: Asparagales
- Family: Orchidaceae
- Subfamily: Orchidoideae
- Genus: Platanthera
- Species: P. orbiculata

Binomial name
- Platanthera orbiculata (Pursh) Lindl.

Synonyms
- Orchis orbiculata Pursh; Habenaria orbiculata (Pursh) Torr.; Habenaria orbiculata var. lehorsii Fernald; Habenaria orbiculata var. menziesii (Lindley) Fernald; Platanthera orbiculata var. lehorsii (Fernald) Catling

= Platanthera orbiculata =

Species of orchid

Platanthera orbiculata, the round leaved orchid or lesser roundleaved orchid, is a species of orchid native to forested areas of North America. It is widespread across most of Canada and parts of the United States (Alaska, New England, Appalachian Mountains, Great Lakes Region, Rocky Mountains, Black Hills and northern Cascades).

== Subspecies ==
There is two accepted subspecies, Platanthera orbiculata var. macrophylla and Platanthera orbiculata var. orbiculata.

== Habitat ==
Platanthera orbiculata is found in moist to mesic shaded locations in forests. Each plant has two large, nearly round leaves that lie close to the ground, plus a vertical flowering stalk bearing a spike of small, white flowers.
