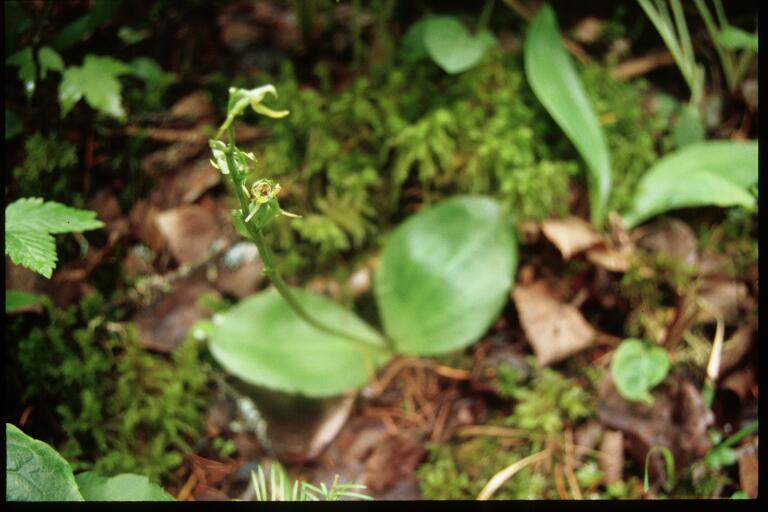

Scientific classification
- Kingdom: Plantae
- Clade: Tracheophytes
- Clade: Angiosperms
- Clade: Monocots
- Order: Asparagales
- Family: Orchidaceae
- Subfamily: Orchidoideae
- Genus: Platanthera
- Species: P. hookeri

Binomial name
- Platanthera hookeri (Torr.) Lindl.

Synonyms
- Habenaria hookeri Torr. ex A. Gray; Habenaria hookeriana Lindl.; Habenaria oblongifolia (C.N. Paine) G.G. Niles; Lysias hookeri (Torr. ex A. Gray) Rydb.; Lysias hookeriana (Lindl.) Rydb.; Orchis hookeri (Torr.) Alph. Wood; Orchis hookeriana (Lindl.) Oakes

= Platanthera hookeri =

Species of orchid

Platanthera hookeri, otherwise known as Hooker's orchid or Hooker's bog orchid, is a perennial wildflower in the genus Platanthera that can be found in temperate regions of North America ranging from Iowa to Newfoundland.

== Characteristics ==
Hooker's orchid prefers partial shade and is found in dry or mesic forests and either deciduous or coniferous woodlands.

=== Leaf structure ===
Basal and opposite, the two leaves for this orchid are found nearly flat on the ground. The leaves are round in shape with the edges and surface being smooth but wrinkled.

=== Pollination and flowers ===
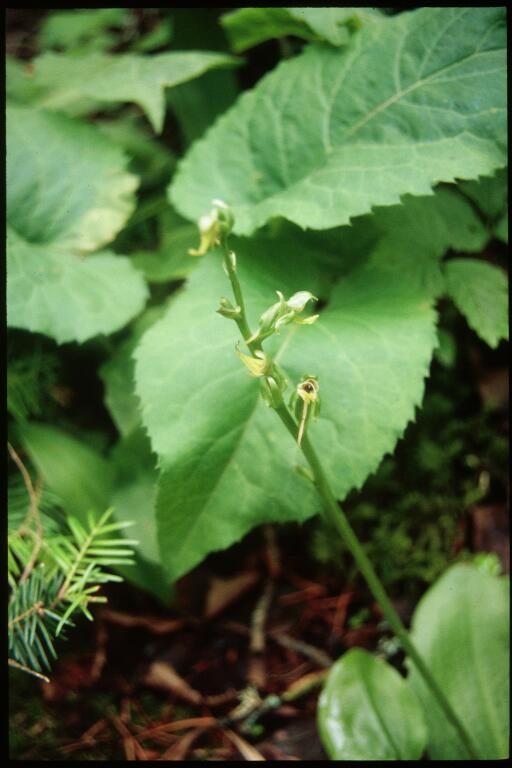

Hooker's orchid flowers take bloom in June and July and are pollinated by skippers and nocturnal moths. Though the flowers are hook-like in shape, the plant is actually named after William Jackson Hooker (1785-1865). The plant typically has between 6 and 25 yellow-green, bractless flowers with the lateral petals and the dorsal sepal converging towards each other while the labellum curves upward.

== Uses ==
The roots of Platanthera hookeri are used to calm the nerves, to relieve urinary and gastric issues, and as a stimulant.
