= Platanthera calceoliformis =

Conservation status
- Endangered (IUCN 3.1)

Scientific classification
- Kingdom: Plantae
- Clade: Tracheophytes
- Clade: Angiosperms
- Clade: Monocots
- Order: Asparagales
- Family: Orchidaceae
- Subfamily: Orchidoideae
- Tribe: Orchideae
- Subtribe: Orchidinae
- Genus: Platanthera
- Species: P. calceoliformis

Binomial name
- Platanthera calceoliformis (W.W.Sm.) X.H.Jin, Schuit. & W.T.Jin

Synonyms
- Herminium calceoliforme W.W.Sm.; Smithorchis calceoliformis (W.W.Sm.) Tang & F.T.Wang

Species of orchid

Platanthera calceoliformis is a species of orchid endemic to north-western Yunnan province, China. It is found at elevations of 3,200–4,000 metres (10,500–13,100 ft) in alpine grasslands. It is listed as an endangered species on the IUCN Red List.

== Taxonomy ==
The species was first described by William Wright Smith in 1921 as Herminium calceoliforme, having been collected by George Forrest in 1914 on the watershed between the Mekong and Yangtze rivers. It has been placed in several genera at different times, including the monotypic genus Smithorchis. A molecular phylogenetic study in 2014 found that it was deeply embedded in a clade of Platanthera species, and so it was transferred to that genus as Platanthera calceoliformis.
