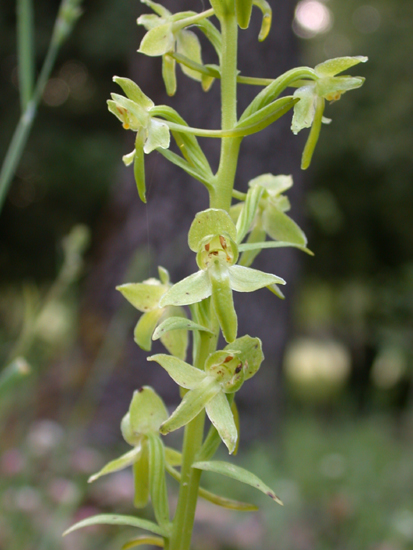
- Flower of Platanthera holmboei

Scientific classification
- Kingdom: Plantae
- Clade: Embryophytes
- Clade: Tracheophytes
- Clade: Spermatophytes
- Clade: Angiosperms
- Clade: Monocots
- Order: Asparagales
- Family: Orchidaceae
- Subfamily: Orchidoideae
- Genus: Platanthera
- Species: P. holmboei

Binomial name
- Platanthera holmboei H.Lindb.

Synonyms
- Platanthera lesbiaca Devillers-Tersch.; Platanthera chlorantha ssp. holmboei (H.Lindb.) J.J.Wood; Platanthera montana ssp. holmboei (H.Lindb.) Ströhle

= Platanthera holmboei =

Species of orchid

Platanthera holmboei is a species of orchid native to the eastern Mediterranean (northern Israel, Syria, Lebanon, Turkey, the Greek Islands, and Cyprus).
