= Platanthera deflexilabella =

Conservation status
- Vulnerable (IUCN 3.1)

Scientific classification
- Kingdom: Plantae
- Clade: Tracheophytes
- Clade: Angiosperms
- Clade: Monocots
- Order: Asparagales
- Family: Orchidaceae
- Subfamily: Orchidoideae
- Genus: Platanthera
- Species: P. deflexilabella

Binomial name
- Platanthera deflexilabella K.Y.Lang

Species of flowering plant

Platanthera deflexilabella is a species of plant in the family Orchidaceae. It is endemic to the Sichuan Province of China.
