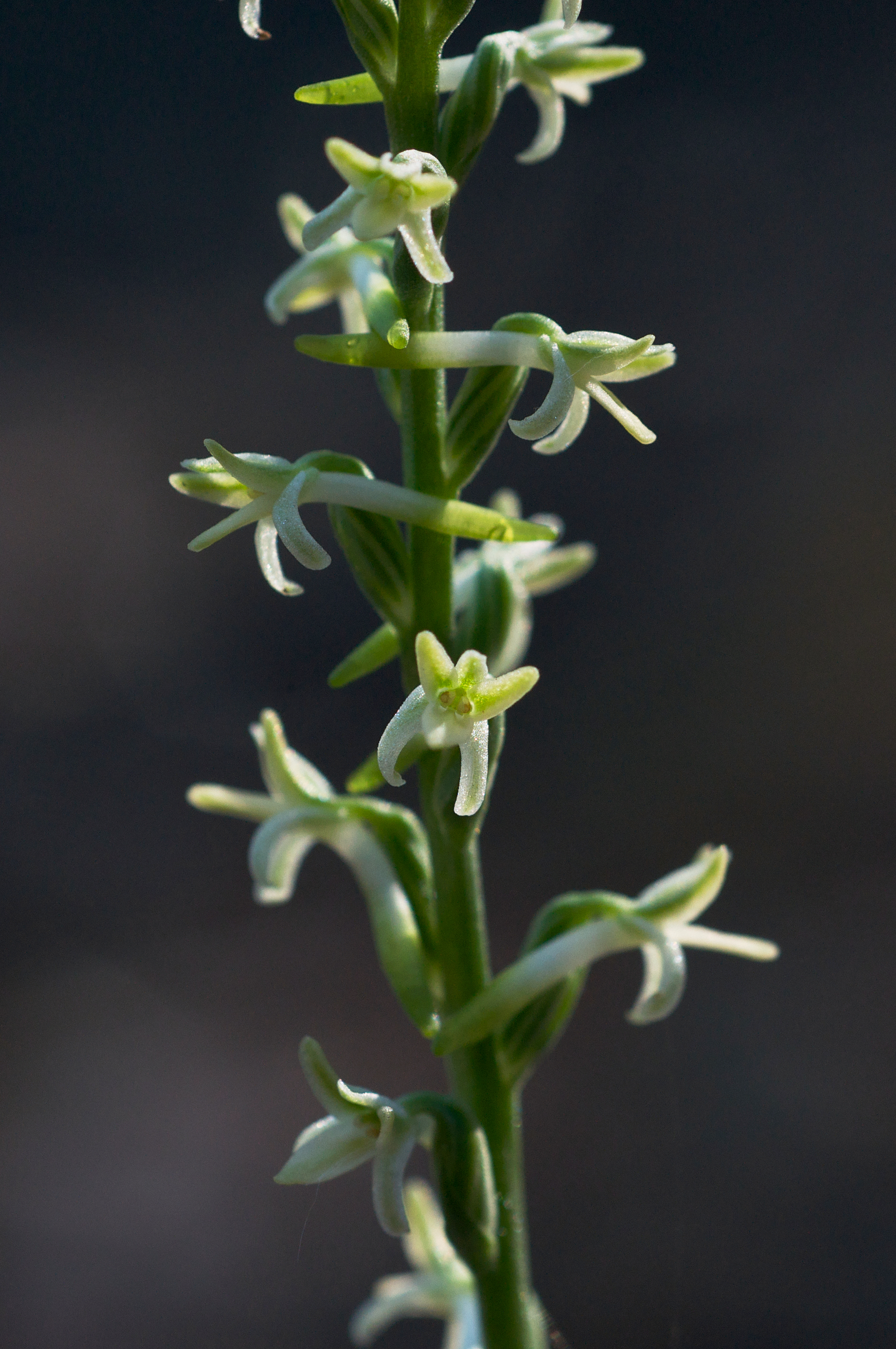

Scientific classification
- Kingdom: Plantae
- Clade: Embryophytes
- Clade: Tracheophytes
- Clade: Spermatophytes
- Clade: Angiosperms
- Clade: Monocots
- Order: Asparagales
- Family: Orchidaceae
- Subfamily: Orchidoideae
- Genus: Platanthera
- Species: P. transversa

Binomial name
- Platanthera transversa (Suksd.) R.M.Bateman

Synonyms
- Piperia transversa Suksd.

= Platanthera transversa =

Species of plant

Platanthera transversa is a species of orchid known by the common names royal rein orchid and flat spurred piperia.

It is native to western North America from British Columbia to California, where it can be found in forest, woodland, chaparral, and scrub habitat, often in dry areas.

== Description ==
This orchid grows erect to about 55 centimeters in maximum height from a bulbous caudex. The basal leaves are up to 19 centimeters long by 4 wide. Leaves higher on the stem are much reduced.

The upper part of the stem is a spikelike inflorescence of many flowers which are white or yellowish with green veining. They are fragrant in the evenings and are said to have a scent like cloves.

They are pollinated by geometrid moths.
