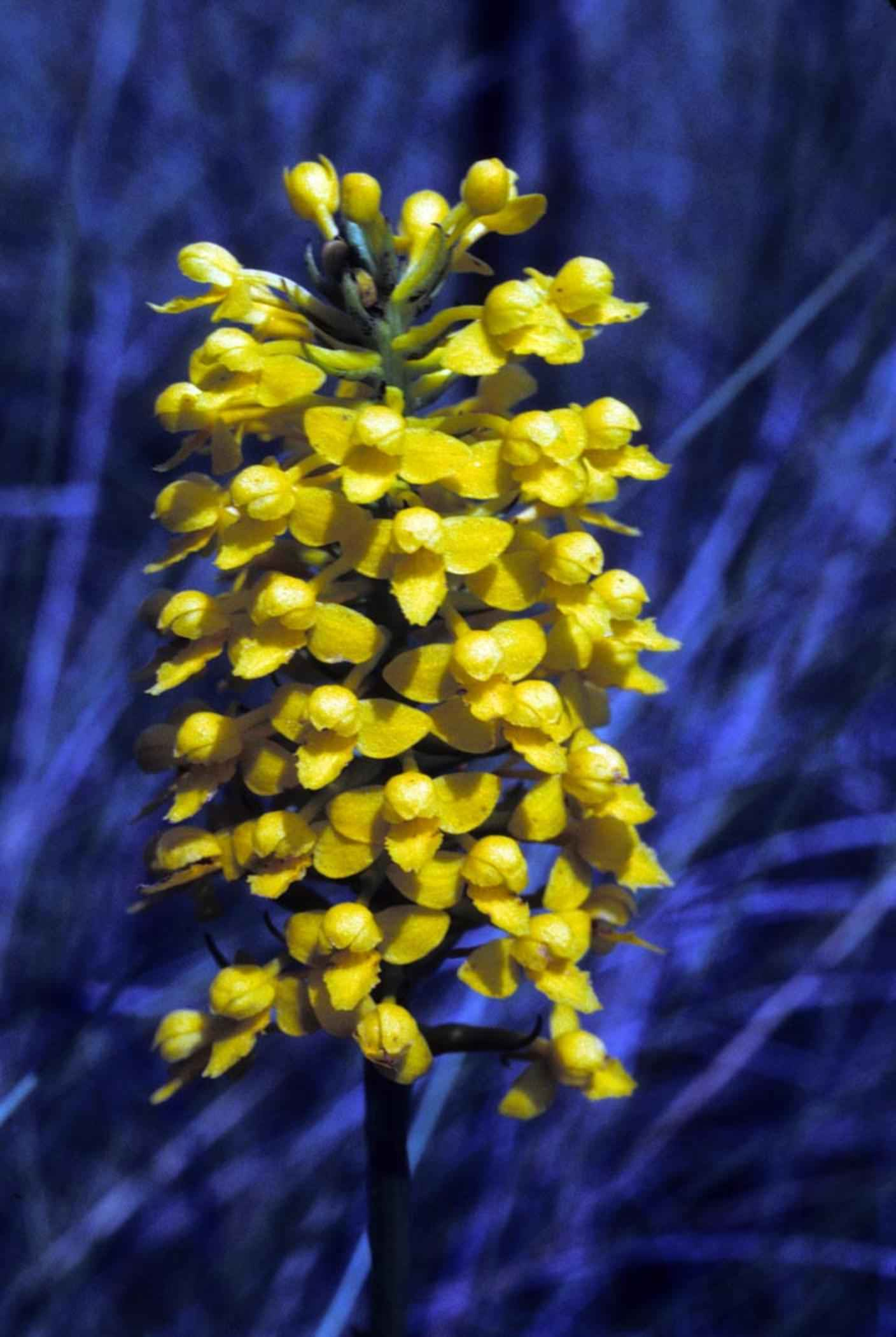

Conservation status
- Vulnerable (NatureServe)

Scientific classification
- Kingdom: Plantae
- Clade: Tracheophytes
- Clade: Angiosperms
- Clade: Monocots
- Order: Asparagales
- Family: Orchidaceae
- Subfamily: Orchidoideae
- Genus: Platanthera
- Species: P. integra

Binomial name
- Platanthera integra (Nutt.) A.Gray ex L.C.Beck

Synonyms
- Orchis integra Nuttall; Habenaria integra (Nuttall) Sprengel

= Platanthera integra =

Yellow fringeless orchid

Species of orchid

Platanthera integra, the yellow fringeless orchid, is a member of the orchid family with yellow flowers. It is native to the Southeastern United States from eastern Texas to North Carolina plus a few isolated populations in Delaware and New Jersey.

Despite the wide range of Platanthera integra, this species is considered vulnerable due to its low number of occurrences. This is primarily due to loss of its habitat, which is open wet savannas and bogs.
