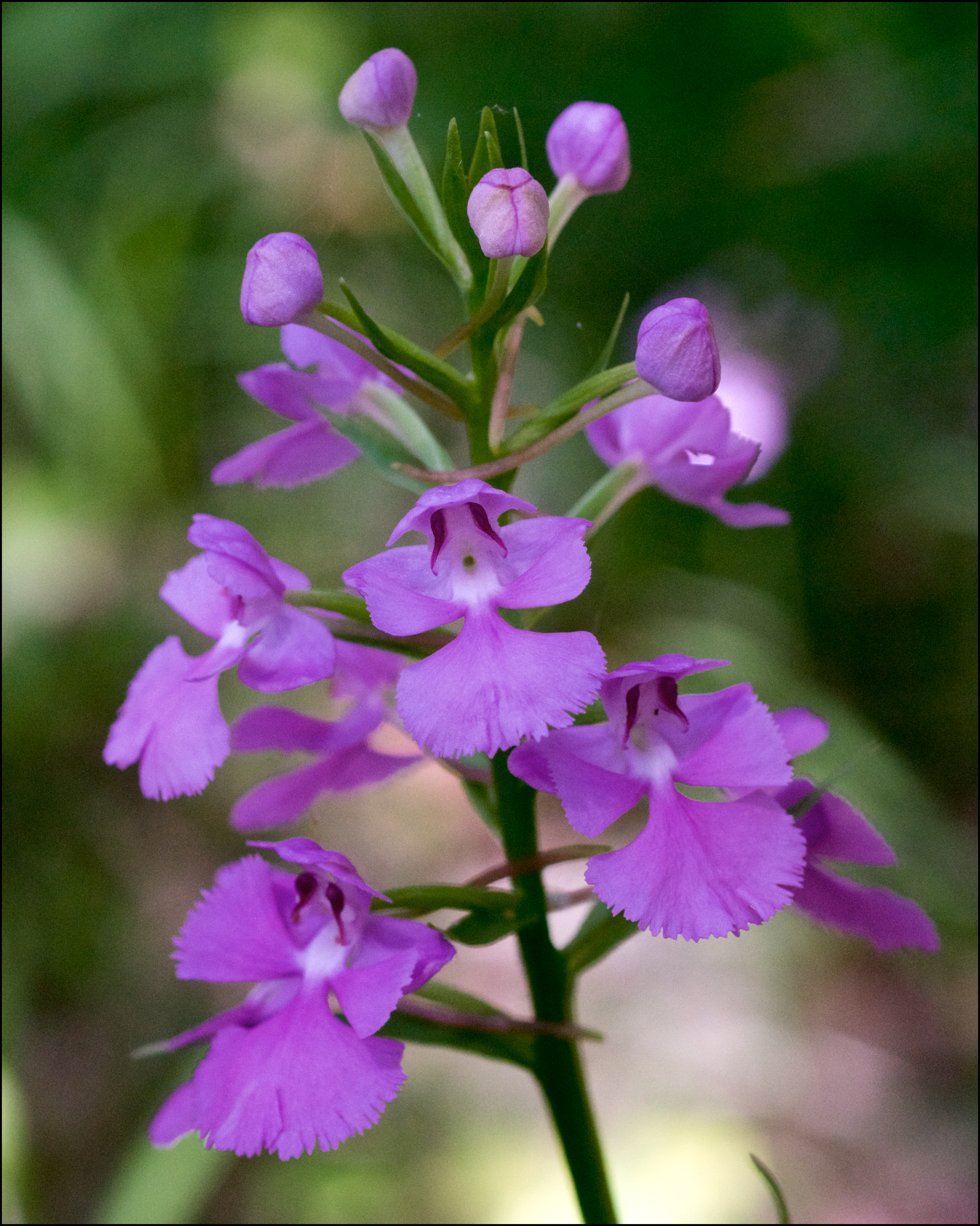

Scientific classification
- Kingdom: Plantae
- Clade: Embryophytes
- Clade: Tracheophytes
- Clade: Spermatophytes
- Clade: Angiosperms
- Clade: Monocots
- Order: Asparagales
- Family: Orchidaceae
- Subfamily: Orchidoideae
- Genus: Platanthera
- Species: P. peramoena

Binomial name
- Platanthera peramoena (A.Gray) A.Gray

Synonyms
- Habenaria peramoena (A.Gray) A.Gray; Orchis peramoena (A.Gray) Alph.Wood; Blephariglottis peramoena (A.Gray) Rydb. in N.L.Britton; Fimbriella peramoena (A.Gray) Butzin; Ophrys fimbriata Walter; Platanthera bigelovii Alph.Wood; Platanthera fissa auct. non (Muhl. ex Willd.) Lindl.; Habenaria psycodes var. fernaldii J.Rousseau & Rouleau; Habenaria psycodes f. leucophaeopsis B.Boivin; Habenaria psycodes f. nivalis F.Seym.; Platanthera peramoena f. doddsiae P.M.Br.; Platanthera psycodes f. fernaldii (J.Rousseau & Rouleau) P.M.Br.; Blephariglottis peramoena f. doddsiae (P.M.Br.) Baumbach & P.M.Br.; Blephariglottis psycodes f. fernaldii (J.Rousseau & Rouleau) Baumbach & P.M.Br.

= Platanthera peramoena =

Purple fringeless orchid

Species of orchid

Platanthera peramoena, the purple fringeless orchid, is a species of flowering plant in the orchid family. It is native to the Eastern United States, where it is found from the Mid-Atlantic states, the Ohio Valley and the Ozark Mountains. Its natural habitat is moist forests, marshes, and on streambanks.

It produces purple flowers in the summer. The moth Hemaris thysbe is considered its main pollinator.
