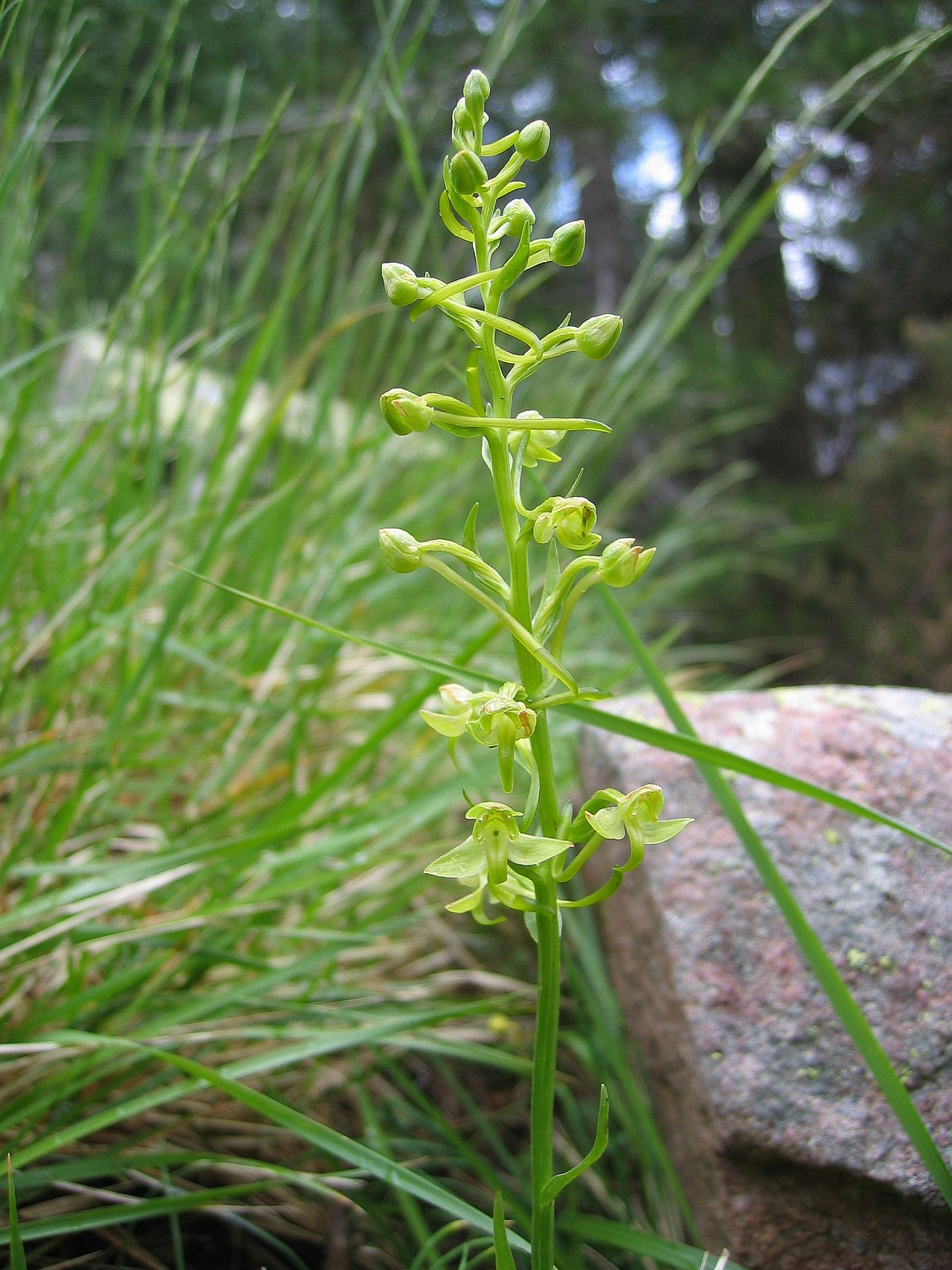
- Flower of Platanthera algeriensis

Scientific classification
- Kingdom: Plantae
- Clade: Embryophytes
- Clade: Tracheophytes
- Clade: Spermatophytes
- Clade: Angiosperms
- Clade: Monocots
- Order: Asparagales
- Family: Orchidaceae
- Subfamily: Orchidoideae
- Genus: Platanthera
- Species: P. algeriensis

Binomial name
- Platanthera algeriensis Batt. & Trab.

Synonyms
- Platanthera chlorantha ssp. algeriensis (Batt. & Trab.) Emb.

= Platanthera algeriensis =

Species of orchid

Platanthera algeriensis is a species of orchid native to eastern and southeastern Spain, Corsica, Sardinia, Algeria and Morocco.
