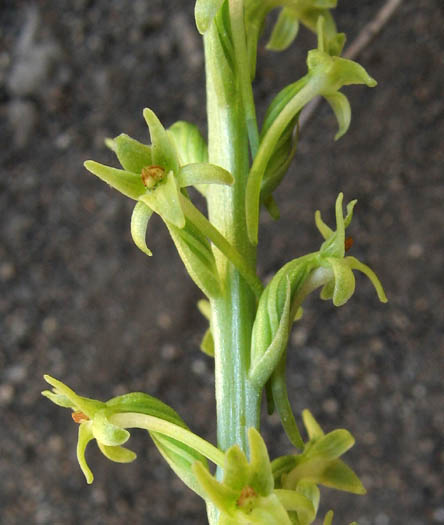

Scientific classification
- Kingdom: Plantae
- Clade: Tracheophytes
- Clade: Angiosperms
- Clade: Monocots
- Order: Asparagales
- Family: Orchidaceae
- Subfamily: Orchidoideae
- Genus: Platanthera
- Species: P. elongata

Binomial name
- Platanthera elongata (Rydb.) R.M.Bateman

= Platanthera elongata =

Species of plant

Platanthera elongata is a species of orchid known by the common names denseflower rein orchid, chaparral orchid and wood rein-orchid. It is native to western North America from British Columbia and Montana to southern California, where it grows in mountain forests and scrub habitat. This orchid grows erect to about 1.3 meters in maximum height from a bulbous caudex, its stem becoming narrow toward the tip. The basal leaves are up to 30 centimeters long by 6.5 wide. Leaves higher on the stem are much reduced. The upper part of the stem is a spikelike inflorescence of many small green flowers which are sometimes densely arranged. They are sometimes faintly and variably fragrant in the evenings. The spur on each flower may be up to 1.5 centimeters long.
