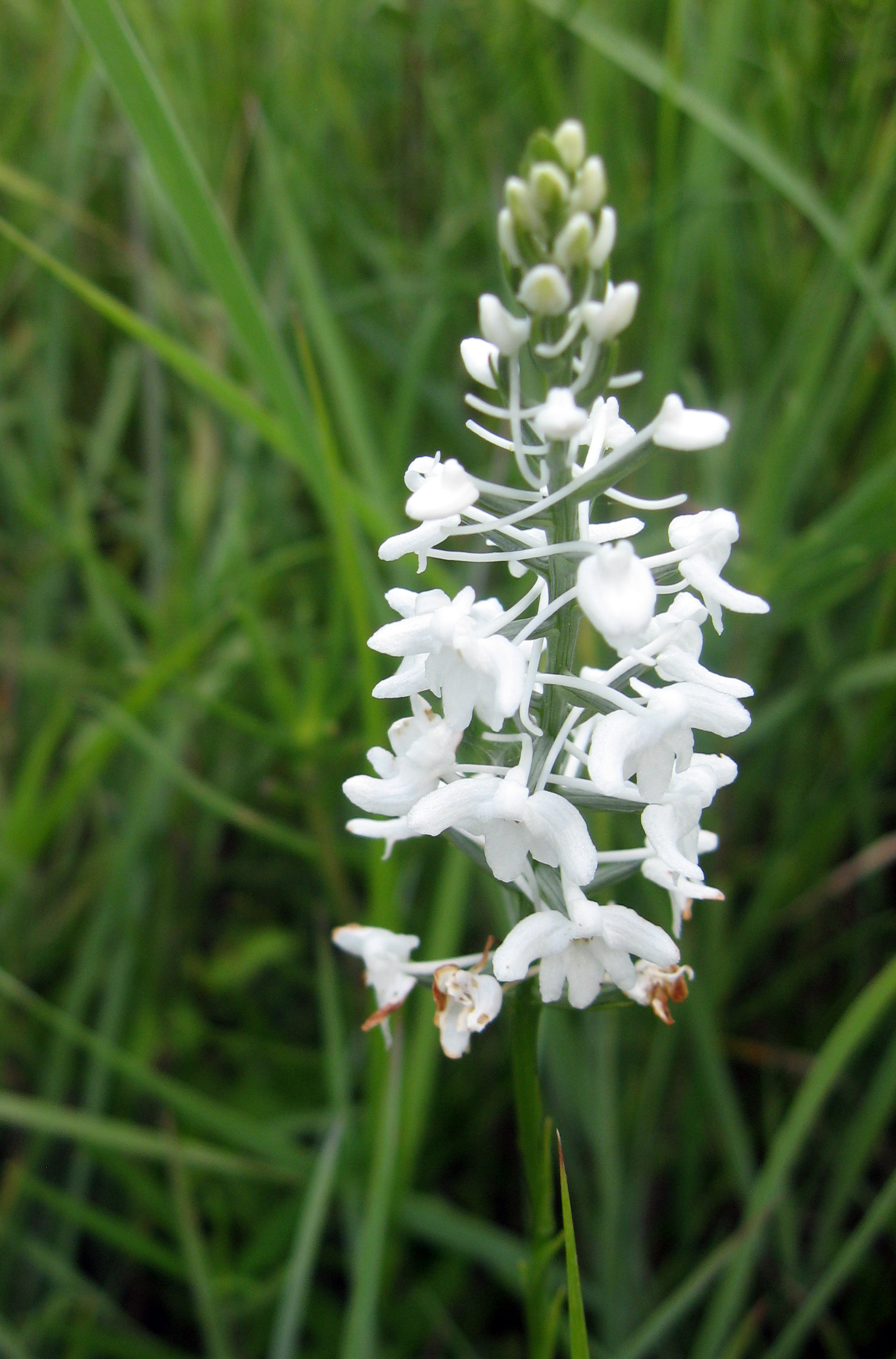

Scientific classification
- Kingdom: Plantae
- Clade: Tracheophytes
- Clade: Angiosperms
- Clade: Monocots
- Order: Asparagales
- Family: Orchidaceae
- Subfamily: Orchidoideae
- Genus: Platanthera
- Species: P. nivea

Binomial name
- Platanthera nivea (Nuttall) Luer

= Platanthera nivea =

Snowy orchid

Species of orchid

Platanthera nivea, commonly called the bog-spike or snowy orchid, is an orchid species of native to the Southeastern United States. Its range is almost entirely restricted to the southeastern Coastal Plain, with a few notable inland populations such as in Coffee County, Tennessee. Within this range, it is found in wet savannas and bogs.

Platanthera nivea has a highly irregular flowering pattern, with whole populations not flowering for a number of years. Populations of this orchid have declined considerably over the 20th century due to habitat destruction.
