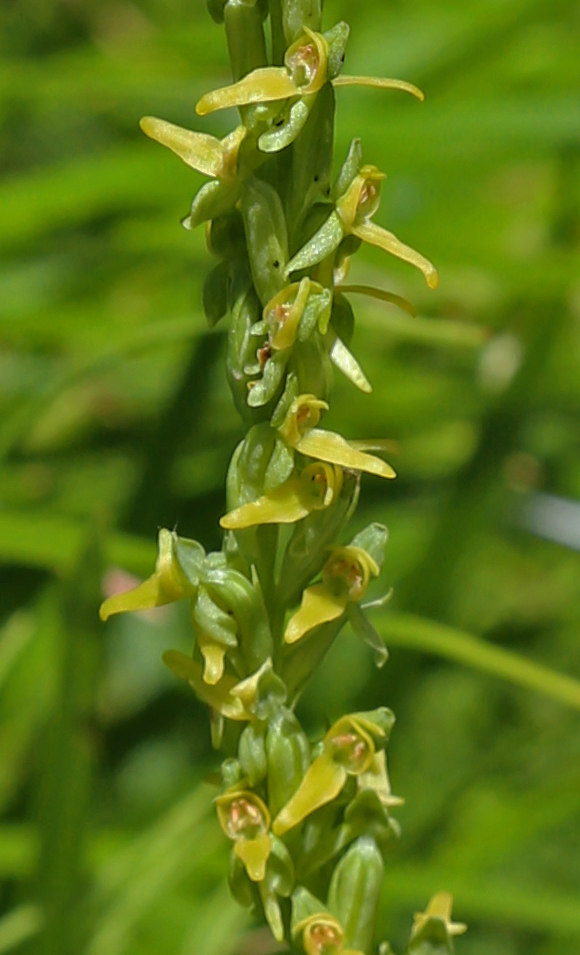

Conservation status
- Vulnerable (NatureServe)

Scientific classification
- Kingdom: Plantae
- Clade: Embryophytes
- Clade: Tracheophytes
- Clade: Spermatophytes
- Clade: Angiosperms
- Clade: Monocots
- Order: Asparagales
- Family: Orchidaceae
- Subfamily: Orchidoideae
- Genus: Platanthera
- Species: P. tescamnis

Binomial name
- Platanthera tescamnis Sheviak & W.F.Jenn.

Synonyms
- Limnorchis tescamnis

= Platanthera tescamnis =

Species of orchid

Platanthera tescamnis, the intermountain bog orchid or yellow rein orchid, is a species of orchid described in 2006. The plant is well-known but had been misidentified. It is native to the Great Basin and Colorado Plateau of the western United States (Colorado, Utah, Arizona, Nevada, California), where it grows in warmer, drier habitat than most related orchids.

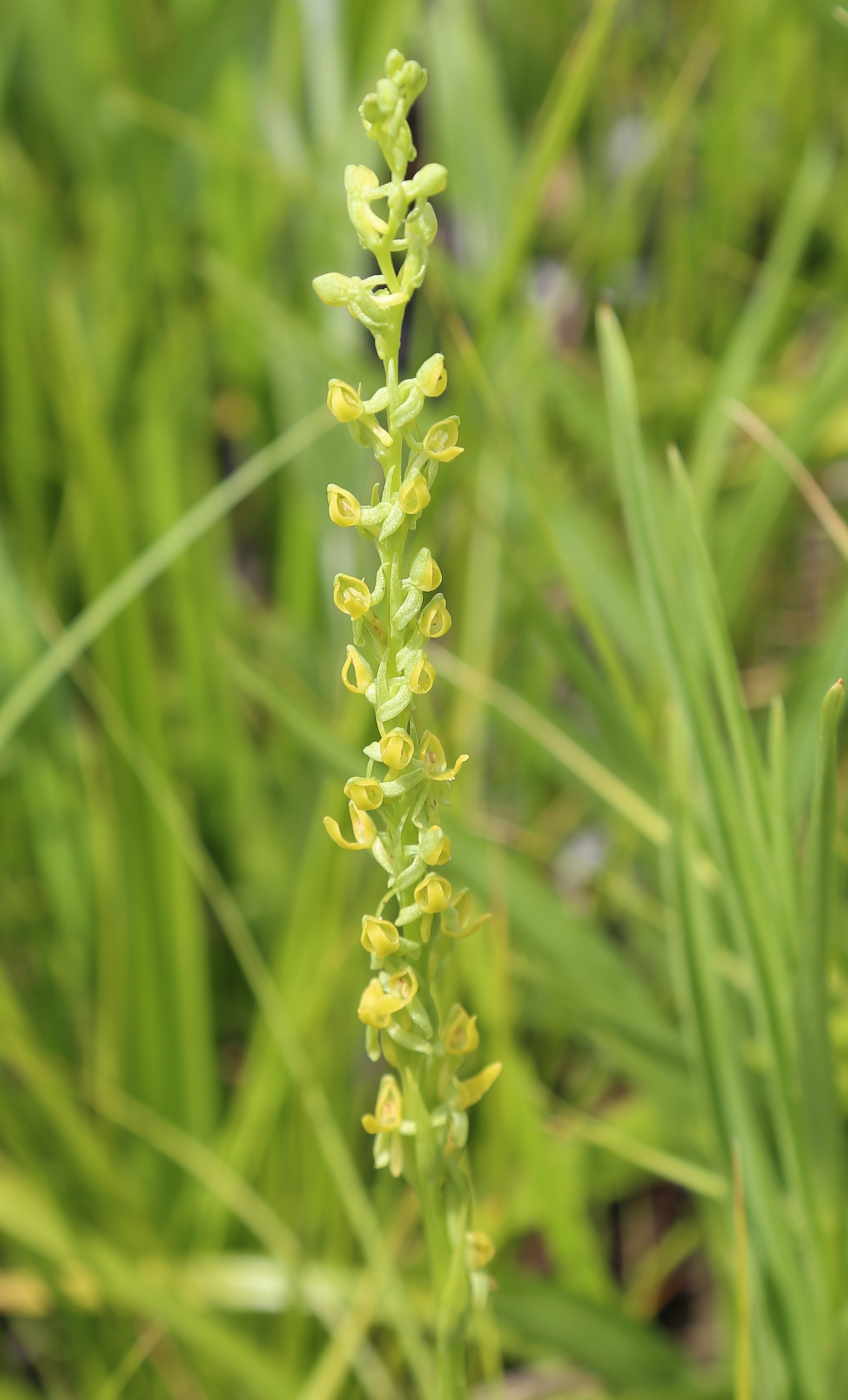
Platanthera tescamnis flowerspike

Platanthera tescamnis produces a slender, erect flowering stem which may exceed one meter (3 ft 3 in) in height. There are several leaves around the base of the stem, lance-shaped to oval and measuring up to 29 centimeters (11 in) long by 5 centimeters (2 in) wide. The inflorescence is a dense spike of many small yellow-green flowers.

== Taxonomy ==
Platanthera tescamnis was scientifically described and named in 2006 by Charles John Sheviak and William F. Jennings. It is classified in the genus Platanthera as part of the family Orchidaceae. It has one homotypic synonym from when Paul Martin Brown, Scott L. Stewart, and Roberto Gamarra Gamarra suggested it should be moved to Limnorchis in 2009.
