= Platanthera carnosilabris =

Scientific classification
- Kingdom: Plantae
- Clade: Tracheophytes
- Clade: Angiosperms
- Clade: Monocots
- Order: Asparagales
- Family: Orchidaceae
- Subfamily: Orchidoideae
- Genus: Platanthera
- Species: P. carnosilabris

Binomial name
- Platanthera carnosilabris (Tang & F.T.Wang) X.H.Jin, Schuit. & W.T.Jin

Synonyms
- Herminium carnosilabre Tang & F.T.Wang

Species of orchid

Platanthera carnosilabris is a species of flowering plant in the orchid family Orchidaceae, native to south-central China (north-west Yunnan).

== Taxonomy ==
The species was first described by Tsin Tang and Fa Tsuan Wang in 1940, as Herminium carnosilabre. A molecular phylogenetic study in 2014 found that it was deeply embedded in a clade of Platanthera species, and so it was transferred to that genus as Platanthera carnosilabre.
