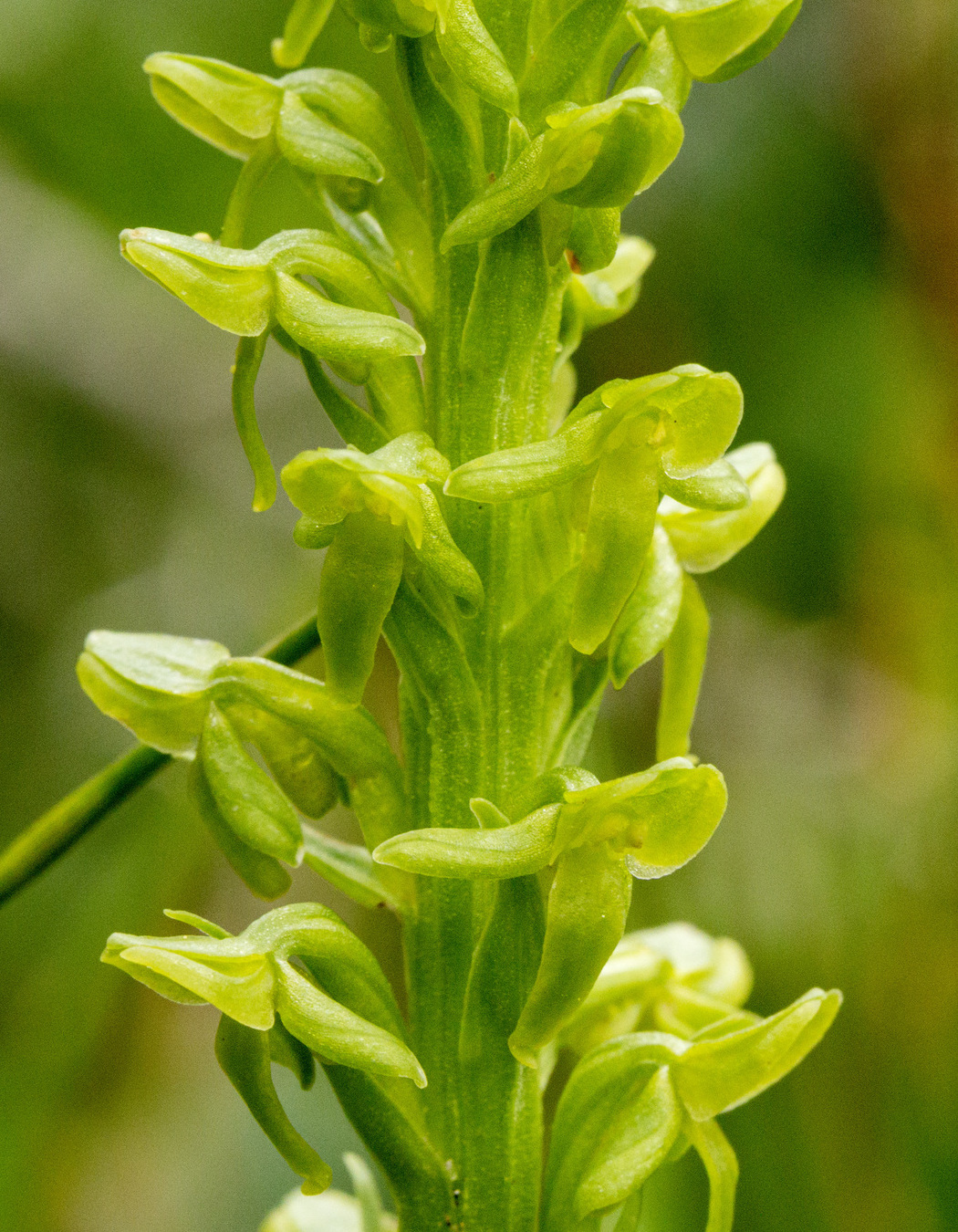
- Platanthera purpurascens

Scientific classification
- Kingdom: Plantae
- Clade: Tracheophytes
- Clade: Angiosperms
- Clade: Monocots
- Order: Asparagales
- Family: Orchidaceae
- Subfamily: Orchidoideae
- Genus: Platanthera
- Species: P. purpurascens

Binomial name
- Platanthera purpurascens (Rydb.) Sheviak & W.F.Jenn.

= Platanthera purpurascens =

Purple petal bog orchid

Species of orchid

Platanthera purpurascens, the purple petal bog orchid, is a terrestrial orchid of North America.

== Description ==
Platanthera purpurascens plants are 24–80 cm tall. Flowering time is from July to August. Flowers are green to yellowish-green with a lip that can be reddish (leading to the common name). The lip is 4-8 mm long and flowers have a short nectar spur which is 2–3 mm long.

== Distribution and habitat ==
Platanthera purpurascens is endemic to the United States, occurring in Arizona, California, Colorado, New Mexico and Wyoming. Plants grow at an elevation of 2500–3300 m. They require wet habitat including seeps, stream banks and meadows.

== Taxonomy ==
Platanthera purpurascens was first described by Per Axel Rydberg in 1901 as Limnorchis purpurascens but later assumed to be the same species or a variation of Platanthera hyperborea or Platanthera stricta. In 1997 it was again described as a separate species, but moved to the genus Platanthera as Platanthera purpurascens by Charles John Sheviak and William F. Jennings. It has four homotypic synonyms.

Table of Synonyms
Name	Year	Rank
Habenaria hyperborea var. purpurascens (Rydb.) Ames	1910	variety
Habenaria purpurascens (Rydb.) Tidestr.	1941	species
Limnorchis purpurascens Rydb.	1901	species
Platanthera hyperborea var. purpurascens (Rydb.) Luer	1975	variety
