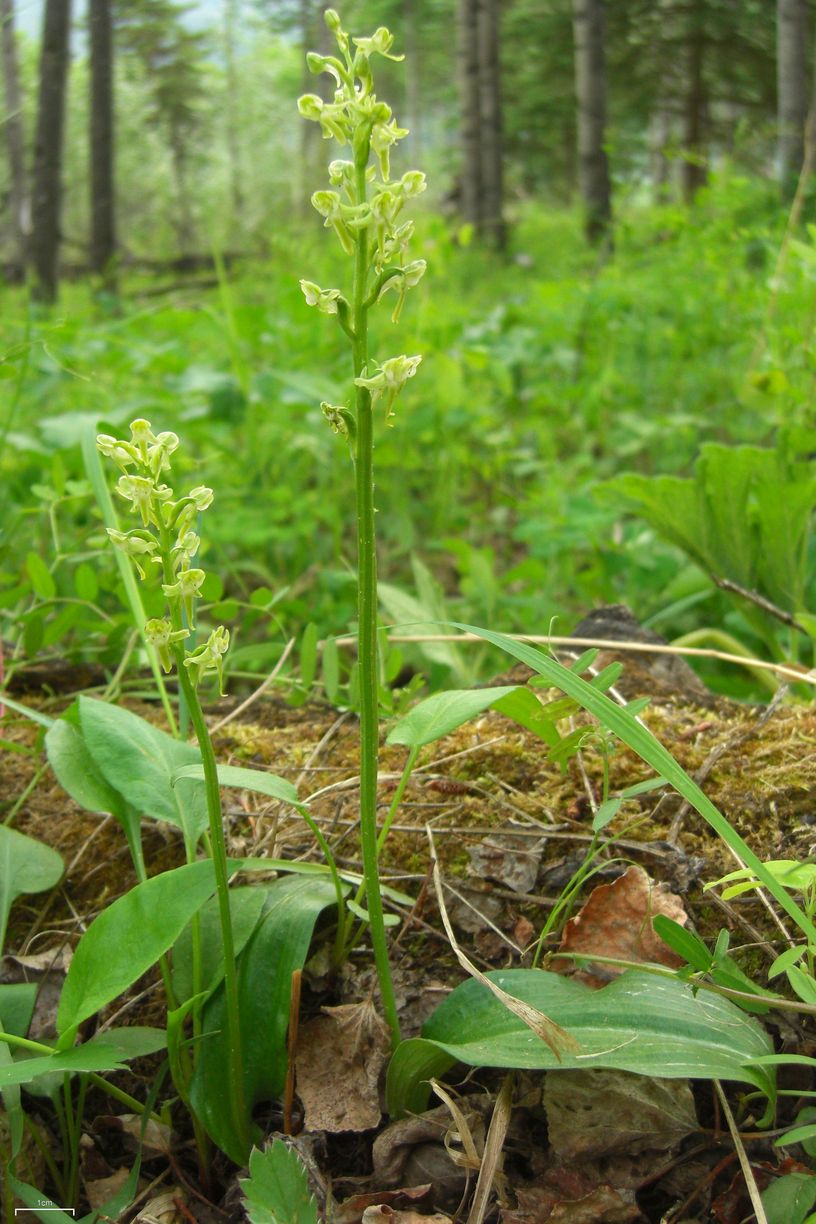

Conservation status
- Secure (NatureServe)

Scientific classification
- Kingdom: Plantae
- Clade: Embryophytes
- Clade: Tracheophytes
- Clade: Spermatophytes
- Clade: Angiosperms
- Clade: Monocots
- Order: Asparagales
- Family: Orchidaceae
- Subfamily: Orchidoideae
- Genus: Platanthera
- Species: P. obtusata

Binomial name
- Platanthera obtusata (Banks ex Pursh) Lindl.

Synonyms
- Habenaria obtusata; Lysiella obtusata; Orchis obtusata

= Platanthera obtusata =

North American species of orchid

Platanthera obtusata, common name blunt-leaved orchid or small northern bog orchid, is a small species of orchid in the genus Platanthera. It widespread across much of the colder regions of the North America, though rare in some parts of its range.

It is pollinated by several species of mosquito as well as by other insects.

== Taxonomy ==
Platanthera obtusata was given its first scientific name, Orchis obtusata, by Frederick Traugott Pursh in 1813 who credited Joseph Banks for the name. The botanist John Lindley moved it to the genus Platanthera in 1835, creating its accepted name. Together with its genus it is part of the family Orchidaceae. It has no accepted subspecies, though the species Platanthera oligantha from Eurasia is included as one by some sources. It has seven synonyms.

Table of Synonyms
Name	Year	Rank	Notes
Habenaria obtusata (Banks ex Pursh) Richardson	1823	species	≡ hom.
Habenaria obtusata var. collectanea Fernald	1926	variety	= het.
Lysiella obtusata (Banks ex Pursh) Rydb.	1900	species	≡ hom.
Orchis obtusata Banks ex Pursh	1813	species	≡ hom.
Platanthera obtusata var. collectanea (Fernald) W.J.Schrenk	1977	variety	= het.
Platanthera obtusata f. collectanea (Fernald) P.M.Br.	1995	form	= het.
Platanthera obtusata f. foliosa P.M.Br.	1995	form	= het.
Notes: ≡ homotypic synonym; = heterotypic synonym
