= Platanthera oreophila =

Conservation status
- Vulnerable (IUCN 3.1)

Scientific classification
- Kingdom: Plantae
- Clade: Tracheophytes
- Clade: Angiosperms
- Clade: Monocots
- Order: Asparagales
- Family: Orchidaceae
- Subfamily: Orchidoideae
- Genus: Platanthera
- Species: P. oreophila

Binomial name
- Platanthera oreophila (W.W.Sm.) Schltr.

Species of flowering plant

Platanthera oreophila is a species of plant in the family Orchidaceae. It is endemic to Yunnan Province of China.
