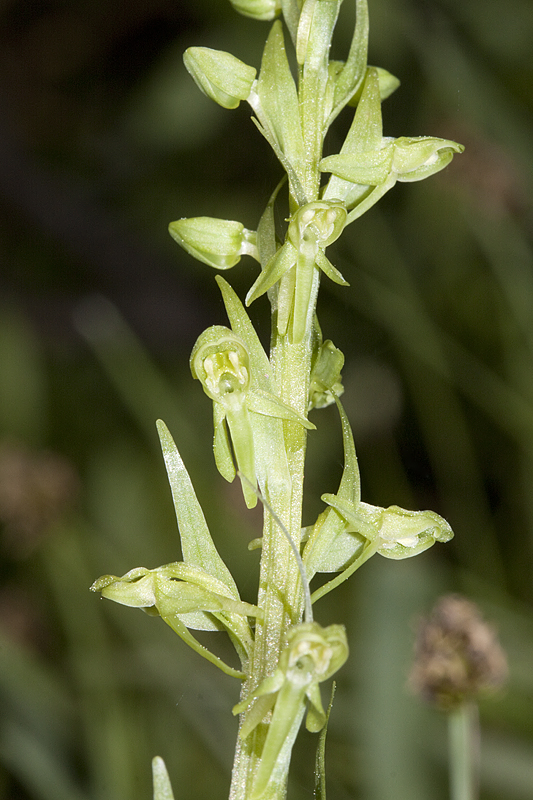

Conservation status
- Apparently Secure (NatureServe)

Scientific classification
- Kingdom: Plantae
- Clade: Embryophytes
- Clade: Tracheophytes
- Clade: Spermatophytes
- Clade: Angiosperms
- Clade: Monocots
- Order: Asparagales
- Family: Orchidaceae
- Subfamily: Orchidoideae
- Genus: Platanthera
- Species: P. sparsiflora

Binomial name
- Platanthera sparsiflora (S.Watson) Schltr.

Synonyms
- List: Habenaria sparsiflora S.Watson; Limnorchis sparsiflora (S.Watson) Rydb.

= Platanthera sparsiflora =

Sparse-flowered bog orchid

North American species of orchid

Platanthera sparsiflora is a species of orchid known by the common name sparse-flowered bog orchid. It is native to the forests and meadows of the western United States (Colorado and New Mexico west to California, plus Washington and Oregon), and also south to Baja California.

Platanthera sparsiflora can be found in wet habitats. It produces a slender, erect flowering stem up to about 1/2 meter (1 ft 8 in) tall. The longest leaves near the base of the stem are up to 15 centimeters (6 in) long by 3 centimeters (1 1/4 in) wide. The inflorescence has widely spaced twisted green flowers with petals up to 1 centimeter (1/3 in) in length.

== Taxonomy ==
Platanthera sparsiflora was scientifically described in 1877 by the botanist Sereno Watson and named Habenaria sparsiflora. It was moved to the genus Platanthera by Rudolf Schlechter in 1899, giving the species its accepted name. Together with its genus it is classified in the family Orchidaceae. It has no accepted varieties, but has some in its nine synonyms.

Table of Synonyms
Name	Year	Rank	Notes
Habenaria aggregata Howell	1902	species	= het.
Habenaria leucostachys var. viridis Jeps.	1921	variety	= het.
Habenaria sparsiflora S.Watson	1877	species	≡ hom.
Habenaria sparsiflora var. laxiflora (Rydb.) Correll	1943	variety	= het.
Habenaria thurberi var. grayi S.Watson	1868	variety	= het.
Limnorchis ensifolia Rydb.	1901	species	= het.
Limnorchis laxiflora Rydb.	1901	species	= het.
Limnorchis sparsiflora (S.Watson) Rydb.	1901	species	≡ hom.
Platanthera sparsiflora var. ensifolia (Rydb.) Luer	1975	variety	= het.
Notes: ≡ homotypic synonym; = heterotypic synonym
