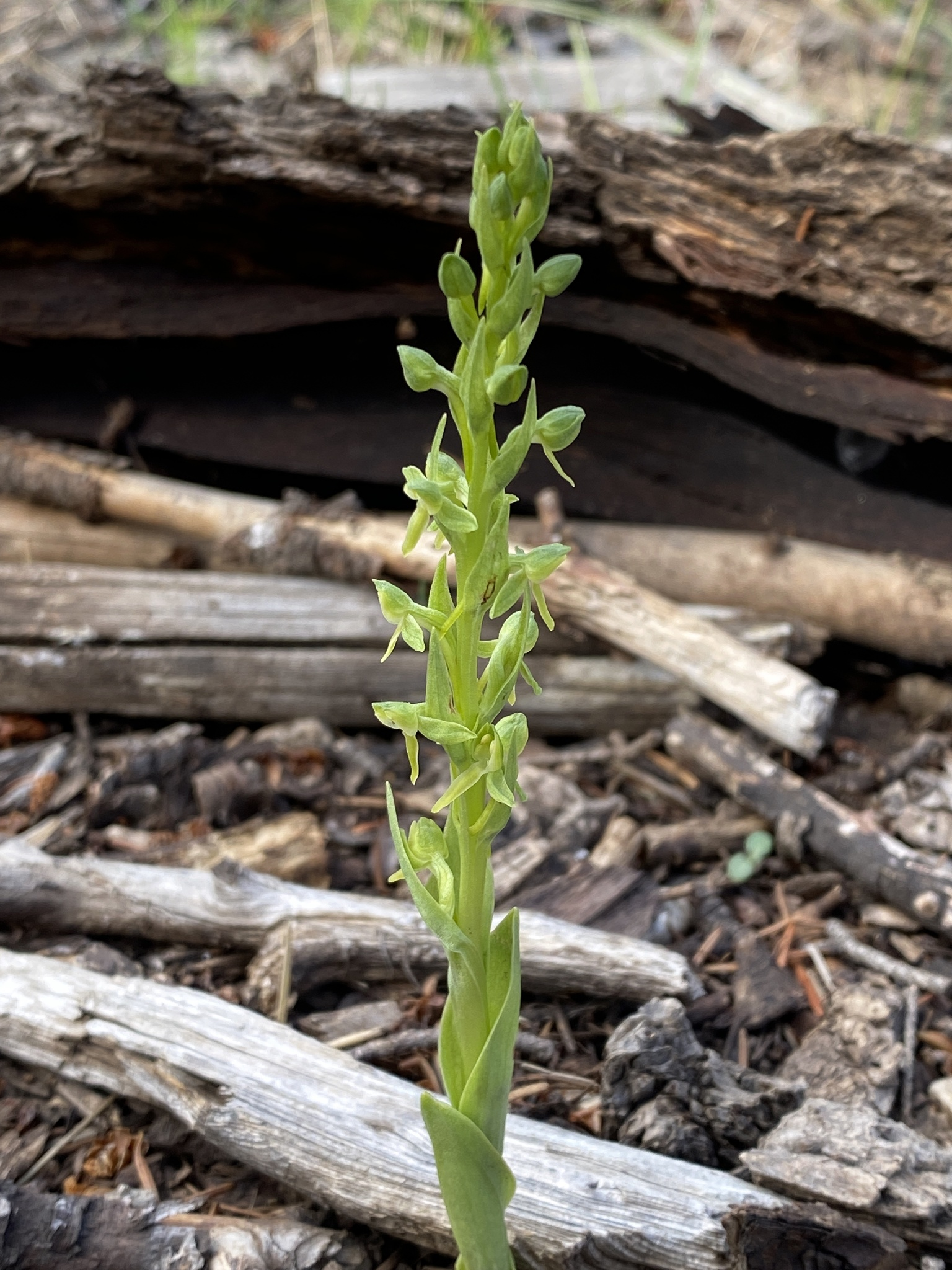
- Platanthera brevifolia

Scientific classification
- Kingdom: Plantae
- Clade: Tracheophytes
- Clade: Angiosperms
- Clade: Monocots
- Order: Asparagales
- Family: Orchidaceae
- Subfamily: Orchidoideae
- Genus: Platanthera
- Species: P. brevifolia

Binomial name
- Platanthera brevifolia (Greene) Senghas

= Platanthera brevifolia =

Shortflowered bog orchid

Species of orchid

Platanthera brevifolia, the shortflowered bog orchid or short-leaf bog orchid, is a terrestrial orchid of North America.

== Description ==
Platanthera brevifolia plants are 16–60 cm tall. Their leaves are close to and sheathing the stem. Flowering time is from July to September, with up to 40 green to yellowish-green flowers. The flowers have a lip which can be 10 mm long and a long nectar spur of 9–20 mm.

== Distribution and habitat ==
Platanthera brevifolia is found in New Mexico in the United States and in Mexico, at an elevation of 2100–2750 m. The habitat is dry to moist gravel, loam and limestone. They prefer open, usually coniferous forest.

== Taxonomy ==
Platanthera brevifolia was first described by Edward Lee Greene in 1881 (as Habenaria brevifolia).
