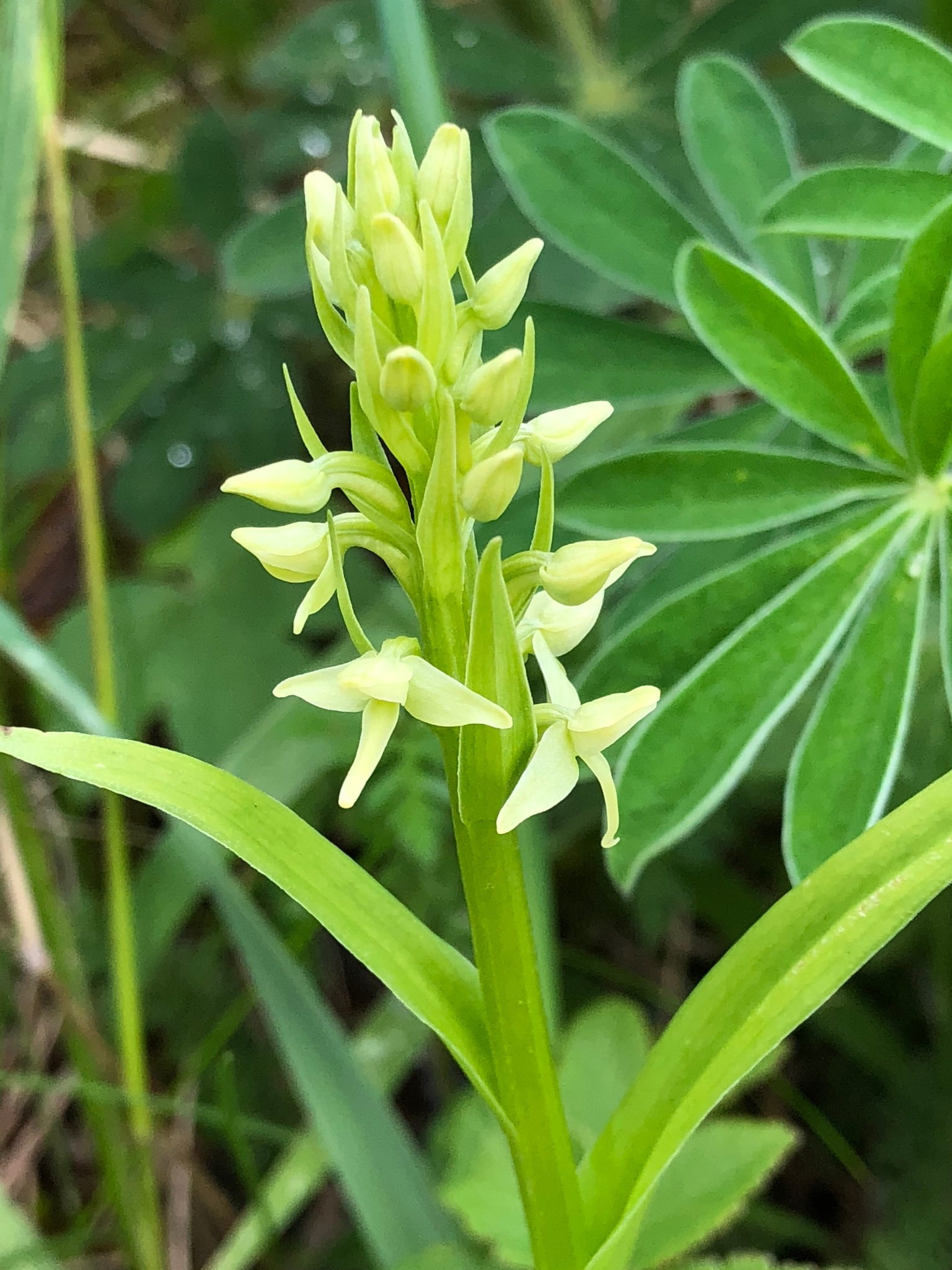
- Platanthera convallariifolia

Scientific classification
- Kingdom: Plantae
- Clade: Embryophytes
- Clade: Tracheophytes
- Clade: Spermatophytes
- Clade: Angiosperms
- Clade: Monocots
- Order: Asparagales
- Family: Orchidaceae
- Subfamily: Orchidoideae
- Genus: Platanthera
- Species: P. convallariifolia

Binomial name
- Platanthera convallariifolia (Fisch. ex Lindl.) Lindl.

= Platanthera convallariifolia =

Species of orchid

Platanthera convallariifolia, the bog orchid, is a species of orchid native to the Aleutian Islands, far east Russia and northern Japan. It grows in wetlands such as fens and marshes.
