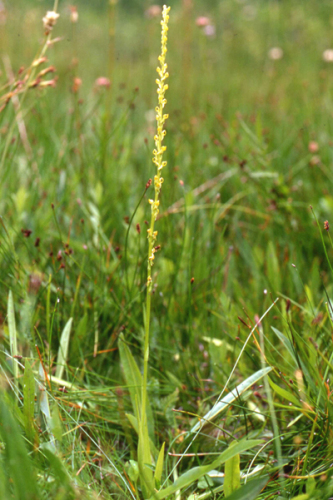

Conservation status
- Imperiled (NatureServe)

Scientific classification
- Kingdom: Plantae
- Clade: Embryophytes
- Clade: Tracheophytes
- Clade: Spermatophytes
- Clade: Angiosperms
- Clade: Monocots
- Order: Asparagales
- Family: Orchidaceae
- Subfamily: Orchidoideae
- Genus: Platanthera
- Species: P. yosemitensis

Binomial name
- Platanthera yosemitensis Colwell, Sheviak and P.Moore

Synonyms
- Limnorchis yosemitensis (Colwell, Sheviak & P.E.Moore) P.M.Br., S.L.Stewart & Gamarra

= Platanthera yosemitensis =

Yosemite bog orchid

Species of orchid

Platanthera yosemitensis, the Yosemite bog orchid, is a species of orchid that is endemic to nine wet montane meadows between the main stem and the South Fork of the Merced River in Yosemite National Park.

First collected in 1923, it was not recognized as a distinct species until 2007. The species grows at altitudes of 1,800–2,700 m (5,900–8,900 ft). The orchid has a foul smell that has variously been described as "corral of horses, asafetida, strong cheese, human feet, sweaty clothing, or simply disagreeable". The orchid's yellow flowers are less than 8 mm (1/4 in) wide, and are pollinated by insects.
