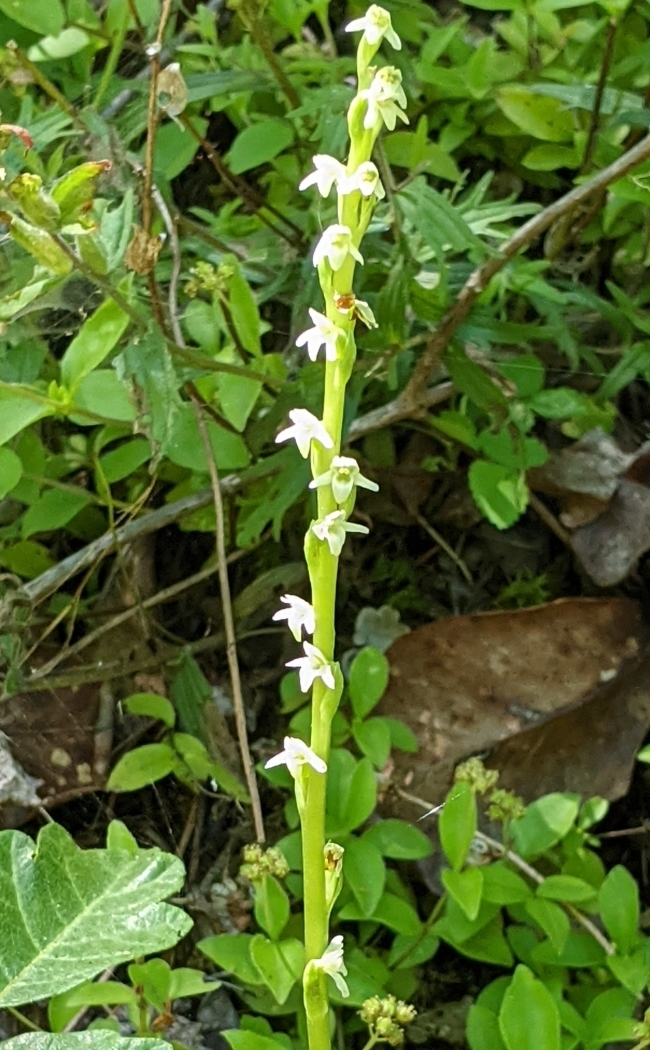

Scientific classification
- Kingdom: Plantae
- Clade: Tracheophytes
- Clade: Angiosperms
- Clade: Monocots
- Order: Asparagales
- Family: Orchidaceae
- Subfamily: Orchidoideae
- Genus: Platanthera
- Species: P. ephemerantha

Binomial name
- Platanthera ephemerantha R.M.Bateman

= Platanthera ephemerantha =

Species of plant

Platanthera ephemerantha is a species of orchid known by the common names white-flower rein orchid, and slender white piperia, and white-flowered piperia. It is native to western North America from Alaska to the San Francisco Bay Area, where it grows in coniferous forests and other habitat in coastal and inland mountain ranges within approximately 150 kilometers of the coast. It grows erect to about half a meter tall, emerging from a bulbous caudex. The basal leaves are up to 18 centimeters long by 3 centimeters wide. Leaves higher on the stem are much reduced. The upper part of the stem is a spikelike inflorescence of up to 100 small flowers, mostly arranged along one side of the stem. The fragrant, honey-scented flowers are whiter than those of other Platanthera, but sometimes green-tinged or green-veined, or green with white margins. The status of this species in the wild is difficult to determine because most populations are small and may produce flowers only rarely.
