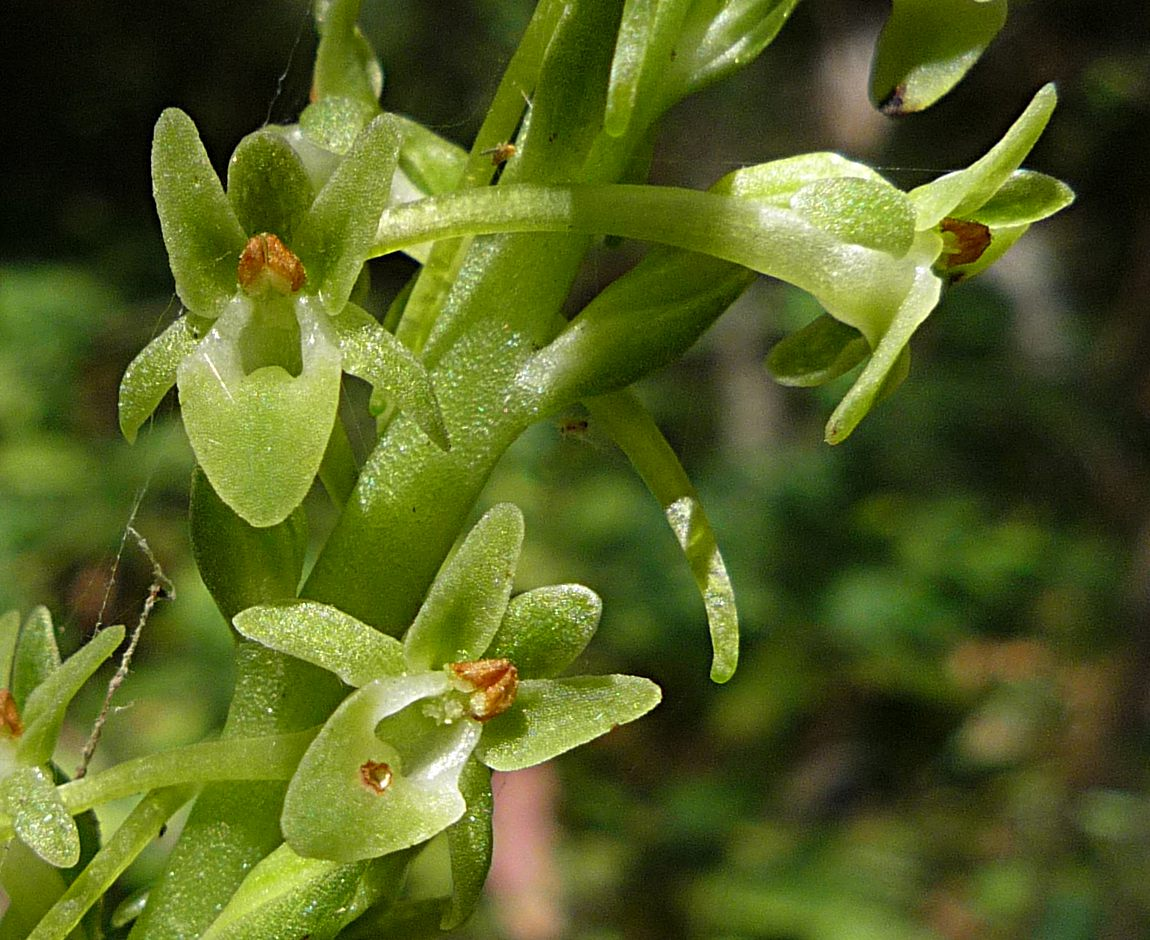

Scientific classification
- Kingdom: Plantae
- Clade: Embryophytes
- Clade: Tracheophytes
- Clade: Spermatophytes
- Clade: Angiosperms
- Clade: Monocots
- Order: Asparagales
- Family: Orchidaceae
- Subfamily: Orchidoideae
- Genus: Platanthera
- Species: P. michaelii

Binomial name
- Platanthera michaelii (Greene) R.M.Bateman

Synonyms
- Habenaria michaelii Greene; Piperia michaelii (Greene) Rydb.; Piperia elongata subsp. michaelii (Greene) Ackerman

= Platanthera michaelii =

Species of orchid

Platanthera michaelii is an uncommon species of orchid known by the common names Michael's rein orchid and Michael's piperia. It is endemic to California, where it is known from the coastal plains, hills, and mountains, and the Sierra Nevada foothills. It can be found in varied habitats, including scrub, woodland, and forest. This orchid grows erect to about 70 centimeters in maximum height from a bulbous caudex. The basal leaves are up to 24 centimeters long by 5 wide. Leaves higher on the stem are much reduced. The upper part of the stem is a spikelike inflorescence of many yellow-green flowers which are fragrant in the evenings.
