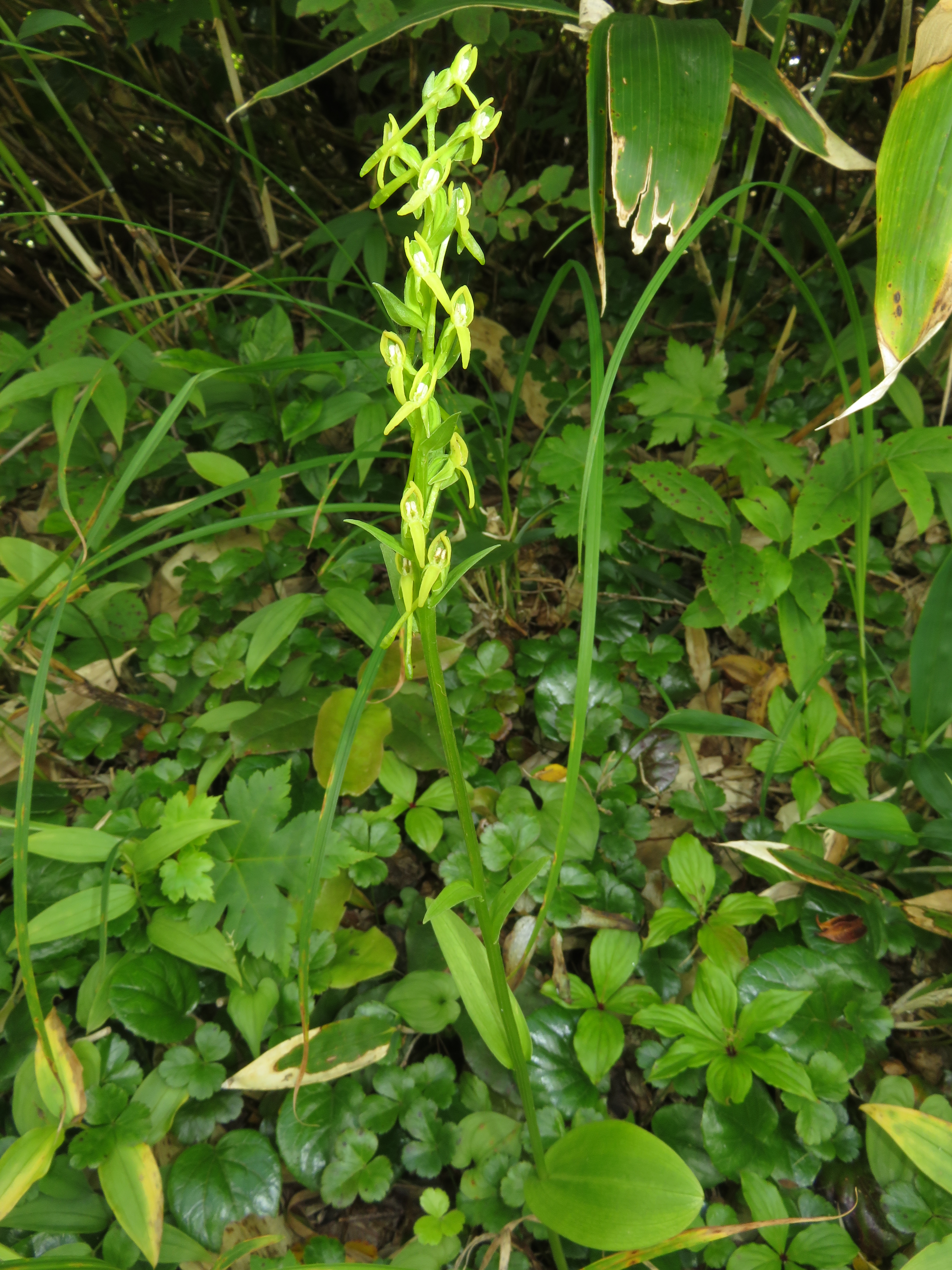

Scientific classification
- Kingdom: Plantae
- Clade: Tracheophytes
- Clade: Angiosperms
- Clade: Monocots
- Order: Asparagales
- Family: Orchidaceae
- Subfamily: Orchidoideae
- Genus: Platanthera
- Species: P. tipuloides

Binomial name
- Platanthera tipuloides (L.f.) Lindl.

= Platanthera tipuloides =

Aleutian bog orchid

Species of orchid

Platanthera tipuloides, the Aleutian bog orchid or Bering bog orchid, is a terrestrial orchid native to the United States, Russia, China, Japan and Korea.

== Description ==
Platanthera tipuloides plants are 20–40 cm tall. There are one or two lance-shaped leaves at the base. There are up to 20 yellow flowers arranged in a spike. Flowering time is from May to July.

== Distribution and habitat ==
Platanthera tipuloides is mainly found in northern Asia. In North America it only occurs on the Aleutian Islands.

Plants grow at an elevation from 700 to 1700 m. They prefer forested slopes, or forest margins along valleys.

== Taxonomy ==
Platanthera tipuloides was first described by Carl Linnaeus the Younger in 1781 as Orchis tipuloides.
