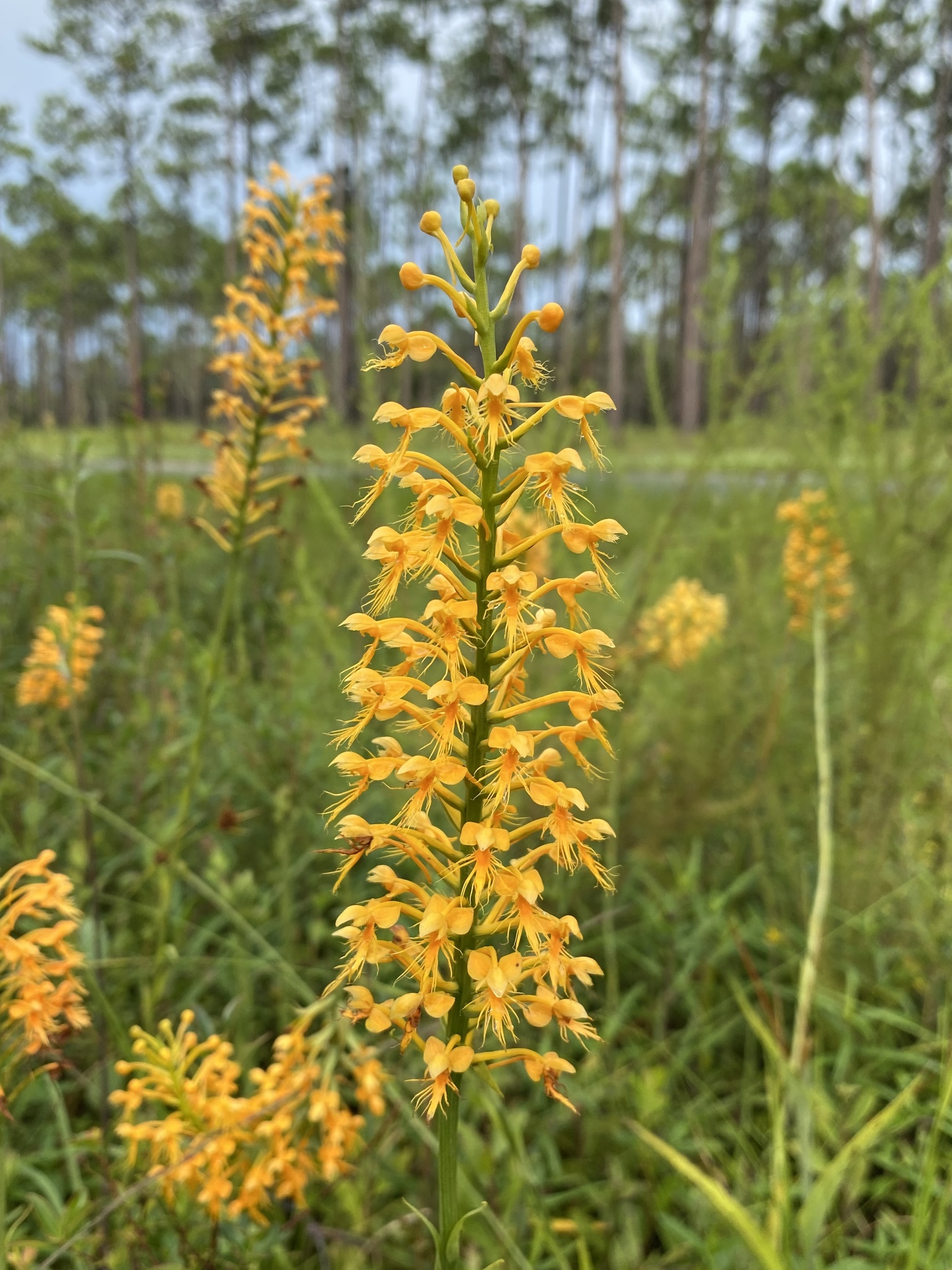

Scientific classification
- Kingdom: Plantae
- Clade: Tracheophytes
- Clade: Angiosperms
- Clade: Monocots
- Order: Asparagales
- Family: Orchidaceae
- Subfamily: Orchidoideae
- Genus: Platanthera
- Species: P. chapmanii

Binomial name
- Platanthera chapmanii (Small) Luer

= Platanthera chapmanii =

Chapman's fringed orchid

Species of orchid

Platanthera chapmanii, common names Chapman's fringed orchid and Chapman's orange-fringed orchid, is an orchid that grows in Northern Florida and adjacent southeastern Georgia as well as in southeastern Texas. It is a monocot in the family Orchidaceae. It is part of the genus Platanthera, meaning wide anther in Latin.
