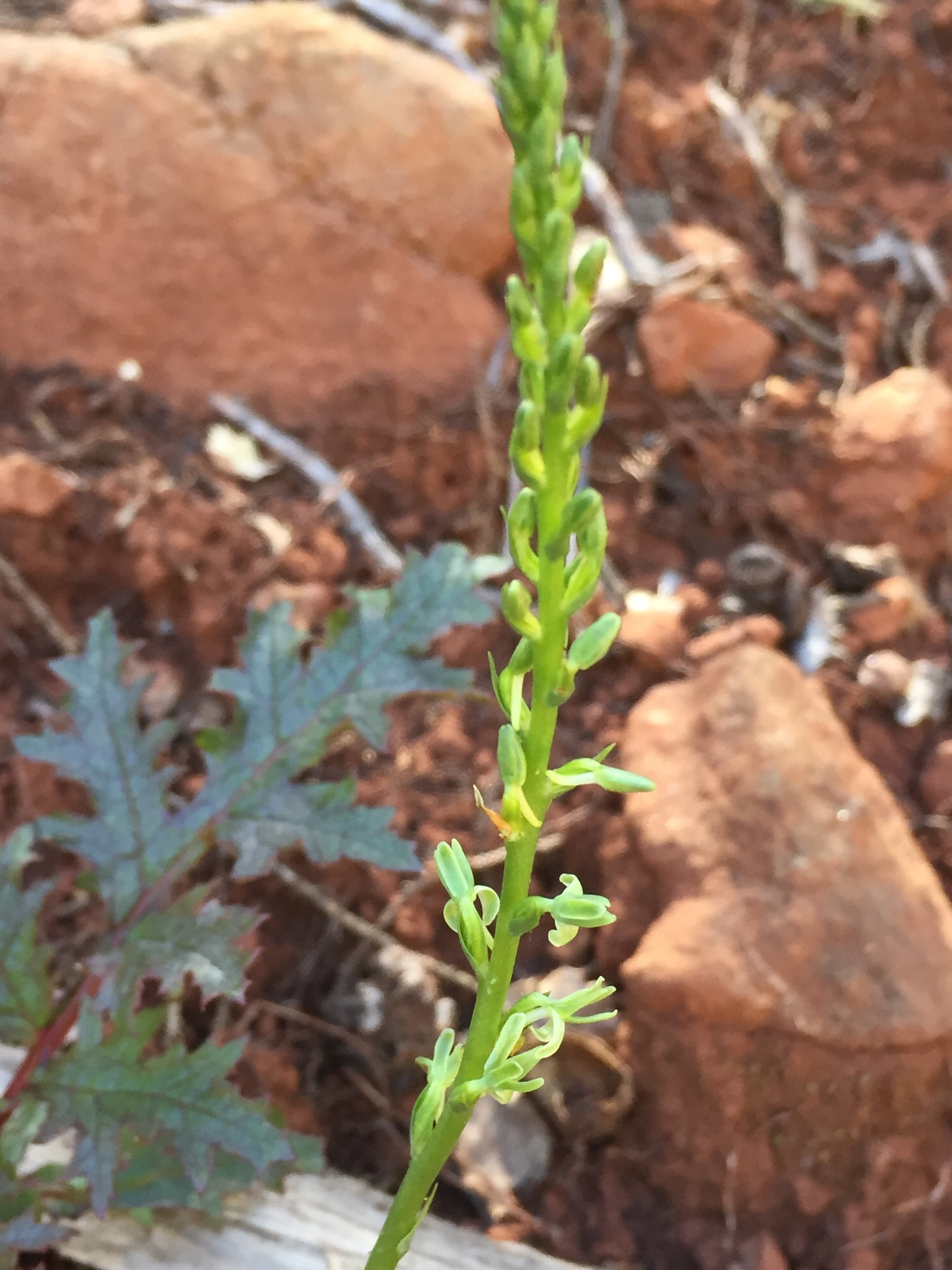

Scientific classification
- Kingdom: Plantae
- Clade: Tracheophytes
- Clade: Angiosperms
- Clade: Monocots
- Order: Asparagales
- Family: Orchidaceae
- Subfamily: Orchidoideae
- Genus: Platanthera
- Species: P. leptopetala

Binomial name
- Platanthera leptopetala (Rydb.) R.M.Bateman

= Platanthera leptopetala =

Species of plant

Platanthera leptopetala is a species of orchid known by the common names narrow-petal rein orchid, and lacy rein orchid. It is native to the west coast of the United States from Washington to California, where it grows in scrub and woodland habitat in mountains and foothills. This orchid grows erect to about 70 centimeters in maximum height from a bulbous caudex. The basal leaves are up to 15 centimeters long by 3 wide. Leaves higher on the stem are much reduced. The upper part of the stem is a spikelike inflorescence of many delicate, translucent green flowers which are sometimes fragrant in the evenings. This rein orchid has narrower petals than those of other species, giving the inflorescence a lacy look, as the common names suggest.
