= Platanthera stenochila =

Scientific classification
- Kingdom: Plantae
- Clade: Tracheophytes
- Clade: Angiosperms
- Clade: Monocots
- Order: Asparagales
- Family: Orchidaceae
- Subfamily: Orchidoideae
- Tribe: Orchideae
- Subtribe: Orchidinae
- Genus: Platanthera
- Species: P. stenochila

Binomial name
- Platanthera stenochila X.H.Jin, Schuit., Raskoti & L.Q.Huang

Synonyms
- Herminium angustilabre King & Pantl.; Monorchis angustilabris (King & Pantl.) O.Schwarz; Androcorys angustilabris (King & Pantl.) Agrawala & H.J.Chowdhery; Platanthera angustilabris (King & Pantl.) X.H.Jin, Schuit. & W.T.Jin, nom. illeg.

Species of flowering plant

Platanthera stenochila is a species of flowering plant in the family Orchidaceae, native from east Nepal through the eastern Himalayas of India to south-central China (north-west Yunnan).

== Taxonomy ==
The species was first described in 1896, as Herminium angustilabre. It was later placed in either the genus Monorchis or the genus Androcorys, both now included in Herminium. A molecular phylogenetic study in 2014 found that it was deeply embedded in a clade of Platanthera species, and so transferred it to that genus as Platanthera angustilabris (King & Pantl.) X.H.Jin, Schuit. & W.T.Jin. However, this name had already been used for a different species, Platanthera angustilabris Seidenf., so was an illegitimate name. In 2015, an acceptable replacement name, Platanthera stenochila, was published.
