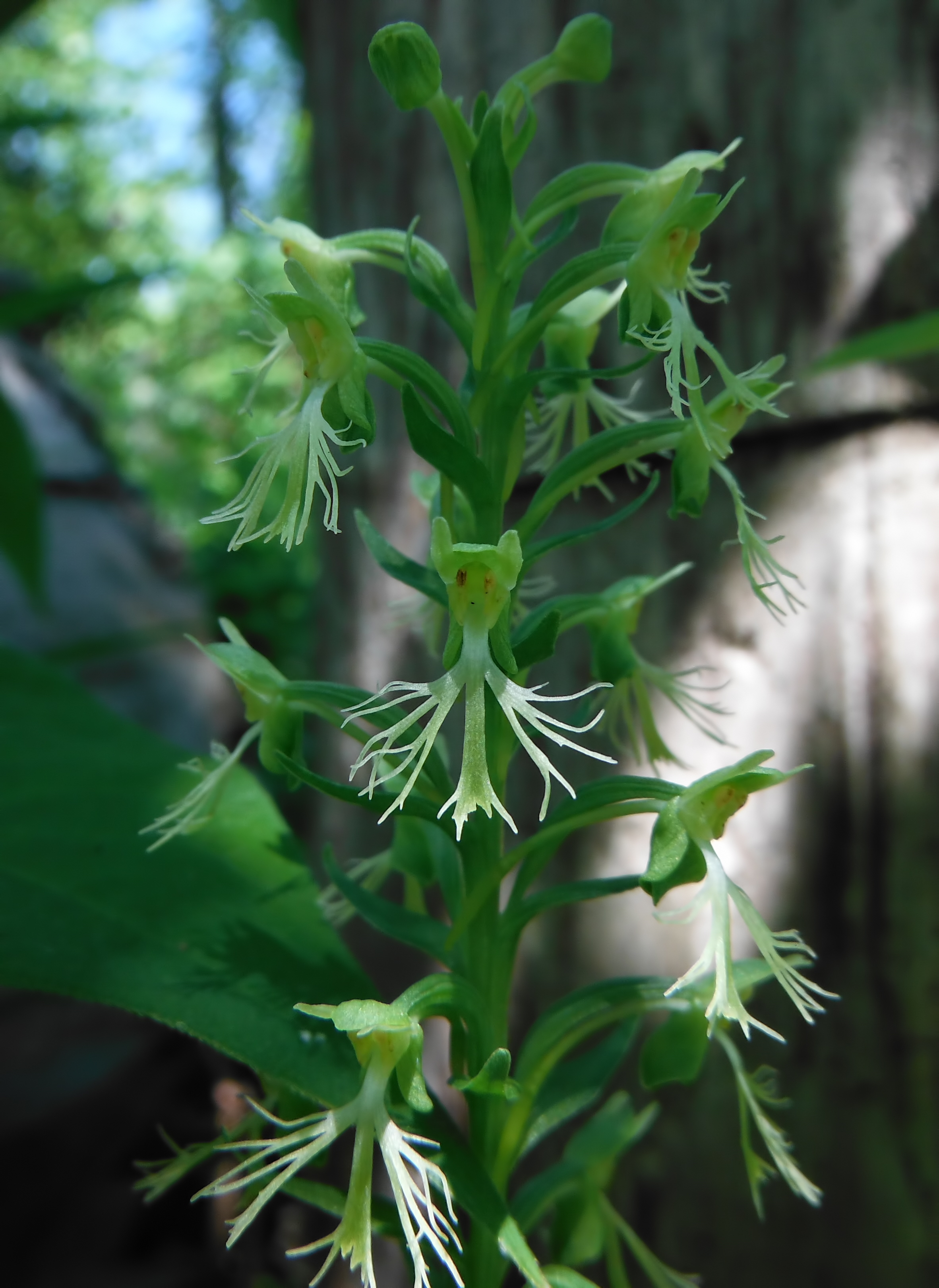
- Platanthera lacera at Indiana Dunes National Lakeshore

Scientific classification
- Kingdom: Plantae
- Clade: Tracheophytes
- Clade: Angiosperms
- Clade: Monocots
- Order: Asparagales
- Family: Orchidaceae
- Subfamily: Orchidoideae
- Genus: Platanthera
- Species: P. lacera

Binomial name
- Platanthera lacera (Michx.) G.Don

Synonyms
- Habenaria lacera (Michx.) R.Br.; Orchis lacera Michx.

= Platanthera lacera =

Green fringed-orchid

Species of orchid

Platanthera lacera is an orchid in the genus Platanthera, native throughout Eastern United States and Canada. It occurs in a variety of habitats ranging from “mesic and dry-mesic sand prairie, wet sedge meadow, calcareous fen, sphagnum bog, acid seep spring, dry field, mesic flatwoods, and mesic upland forests.” Common names include ragged fringed orchid and green fringed orchid.

== Identification ==
It is a perennial growing 20 to 77 centimeters (8 to 30 1/3 in) tall. 2 to 7 lanceolate to narrow elliptic leaves should be present. The inflorescence is a terminal racemic structure, 4 to 25 centimeters (1 1/2 to 9 3/4 in) long with 15 to 60 whitish-green flowers.

== Pollination ==
The flowers are fragrant at night and are pollinated by crepuscular moths.
