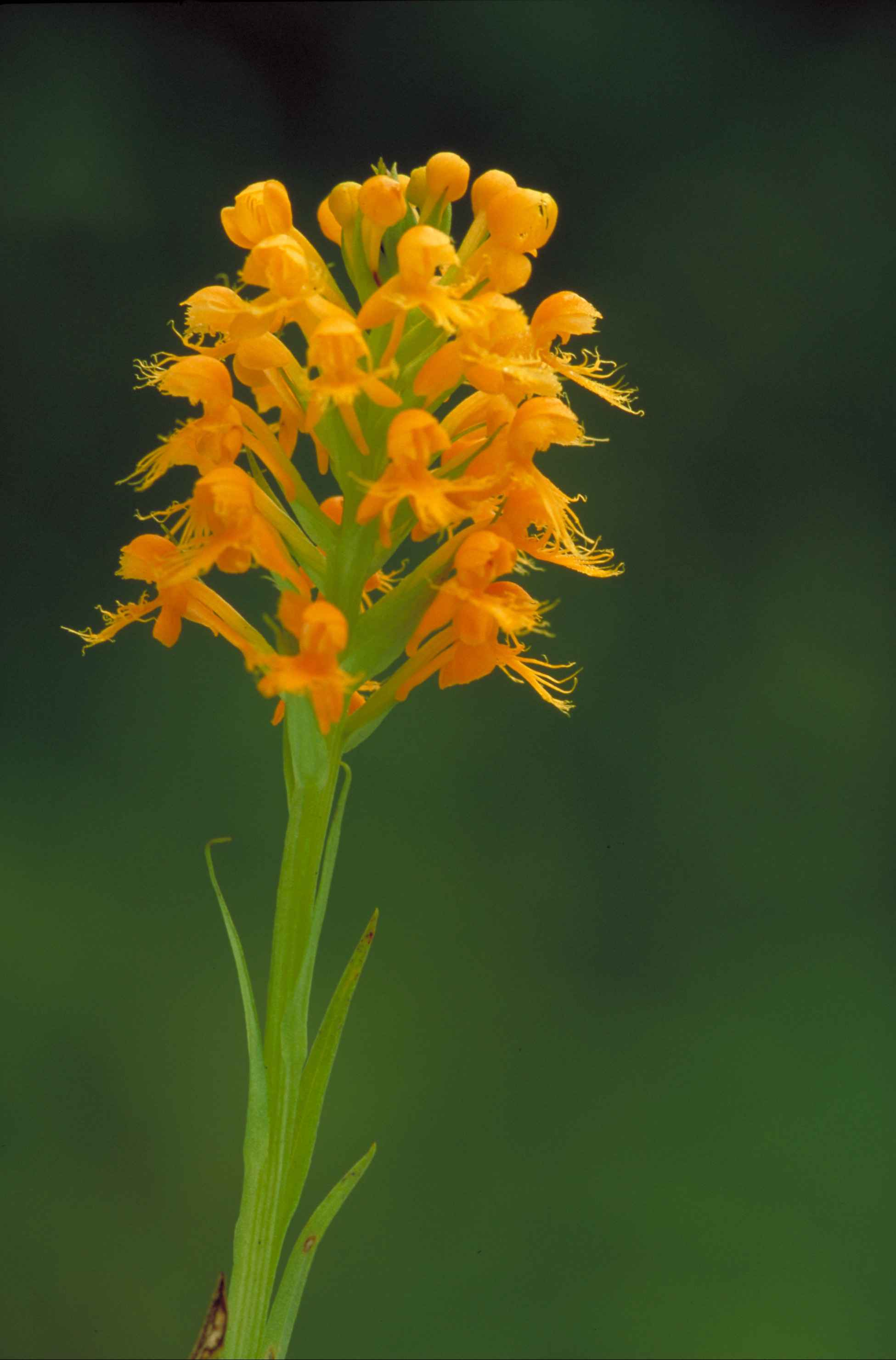

Scientific classification
- Kingdom: Plantae
- Clade: Tracheophytes
- Clade: Angiosperms
- Clade: Monocots
- Order: Asparagales
- Family: Orchidaceae
- Subfamily: Orchidoideae
- Genus: Platanthera
- Species: P. cristata

Binomial name
- Platanthera cristata (Michx.) Lindl.

Synonyms
- Blephariglottis cristata

= Platanthera cristata =

Species of orchid

Platanthera cristata, commonly known as the crested yellow orchid or the crested orange bog orchid, is a species of orchid, a flowering plant in the family Orchidaceae, native to North America. It was first formally described in 1835 by English botanist, John Lindley.

It produces 2–4 stem leaves and bears a dense inflorescence of multiple showy, bright orange flowers. The labellum is often highly fringed, and a spur protrudes from the back of the flower with a triangular or key-hole shaped opening. It can be found growing in moist meadows, marshes, and prairies, as well as in sphagnum bogs and wooded flats across the southeastern United States from Texas to Florida and up the east coast to New Hampshire.
