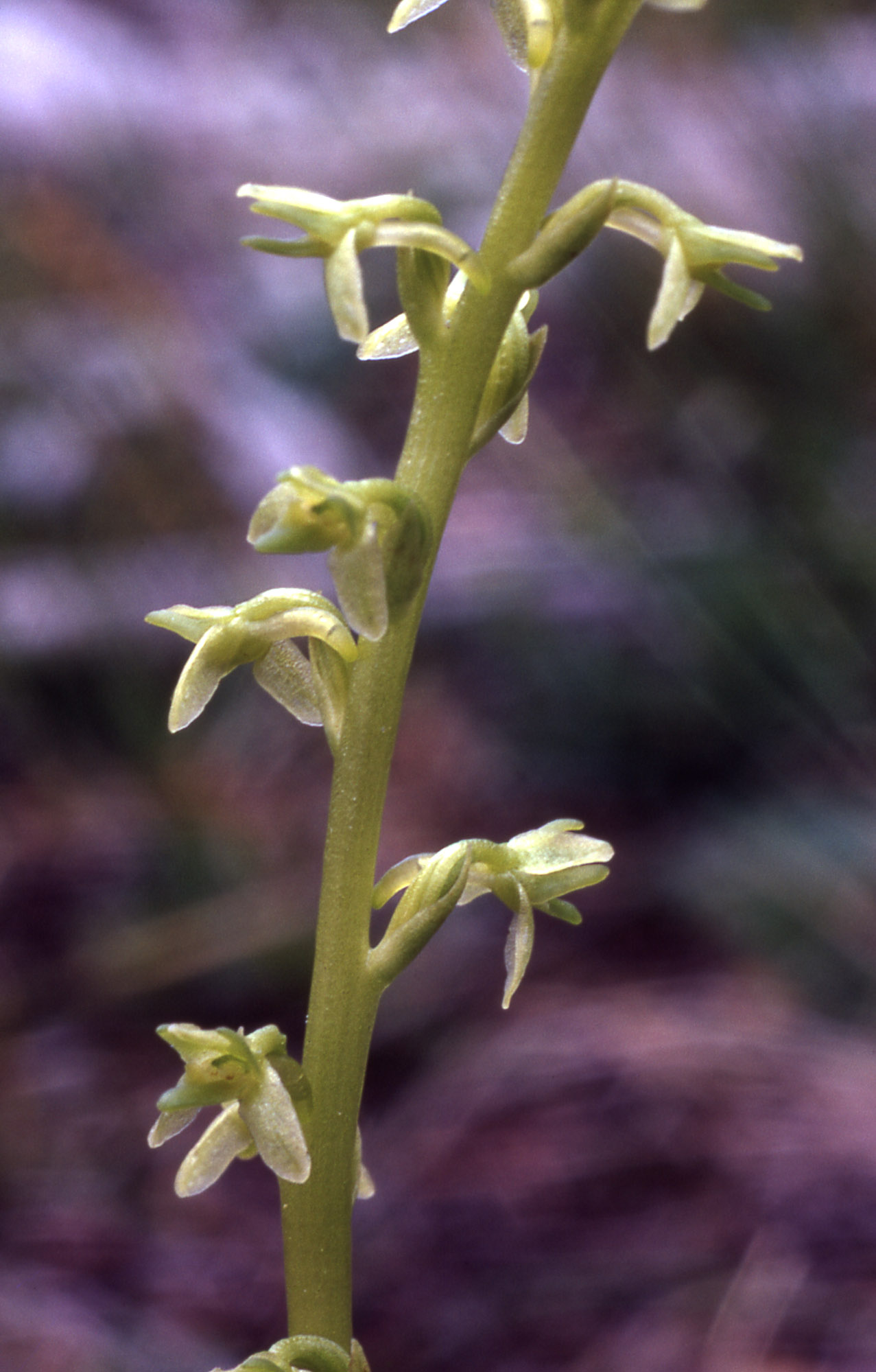

Scientific classification
- Kingdom: Plantae
- Clade: Tracheophytes
- Clade: Angiosperms
- Clade: Monocots
- Order: Asparagales
- Family: Orchidaceae
- Subfamily: Orchidoideae
- Genus: Platanthera
- Species: P. unalascensis

Binomial name
- Platanthera unalascensis (Spreng.) Kurtz

Synonyms
- List: Habenaria unalaschensis; Herminium unalascense; Monorchis unalaschcensis; Piperia unalascensis; Spiranthes unalascensis

= Platanthera unalascensis =

North American species of orchid

Platanthera unalascensis is a species of orchid known by the common names slender-spire orchid, Alaska piperia and Alaska rein orchid. It is native to much of western North America from Alaska to the southwestern United States, as well as eastern sections of Canada and the Great Lakes. It can be found in forest, woodland, and scrub habitat, often in dry areas. This orchid grows erect to about 70 centimeters (28 in) in maximum height. The basal leaves are up to 15 centimeters long by 4 wide (5.9 by 1.6 in). Leaves higher on the stem are much reduced. The upper part of the stem is a slender, spikelike inflorescence of widely spaced translucent green flowers. The flowers are fragrant in the evenings, with a musky, soapy, or honeylike scent. The plant is variable in size, stem thickness, density of inflorescence, petal shape, and scent. Plants of the coast ranges and the Pacific Northwest are stouter and have broader sepals and petals than do interior and montane forms.

== Taxonomy ==
Platanthera unalascensis was scientifically described in 1826 by Kurt Polycarp Joachim Sprengel who named it Spiranthes unalascensis. It was placed in the genus Platanthera in 1894 by Fritz Kurtz. Though it has been placed elsewhere by other botanists, this is the accepted name for the species. It has no accepted subspecies and has ten synonyms.

Table of Synonyms
Name	Year	Rank	Notes
Habenaria foetida (Geyer ex Hook.) S.Watson	1871	species	= het.
Habenaria schischmareffiana Cham.	1828	species	= het.
Habenaria unalaschensis (Spreng.) S.Watson	1877	species	≡ hom.
Herminium unalascense (Spreng.) Rchb.f.	1851	species	≡ hom.
Monorchis unalaschcensis (Spreng.) O.Schwarz	1949	species	≡ hom.
Piperia unalascensis (Spreng.) Rydb.	1901	species	≡ hom.
Piperia unalascensis f. olympica P.M.Br.	2004	form	= het.
Platanthera foetida Geyer ex Hook.	1855	species	= het.
Platanthera schischmareffiana (Cham.) Lindl.	1835	species	= het.
Spiranthes unalascensis Spreng.	1826	species	≡ hom.
Notes: ≡ homotypic synonym; = heterotypic synonym
