= Platanthera finetiana =

Conservation status
- Vulnerable (IUCN 3.1)

Scientific classification
- Kingdom: Plantae
- Clade: Tracheophytes
- Clade: Angiosperms
- Clade: Monocots
- Order: Asparagales
- Family: Orchidaceae
- Subfamily: Orchidoideae
- Genus: Platanthera
- Species: P. finetiana

Binomial name
- Platanthera finetiana Schltr.

Synonyms
- Habenaria stenantha var. auriculata (Finet) S.Y.Hu; Hemihabenaria stenantha var. auriculata Finet; Tulotis finetiana (Schltr.) Efimov; Platanthera likiangensis Tang & F.T.Wang; Platanthera sinica Tang & F.T.Wang; Tulotis sinica (Tang & F.T.Wang) Efimov

Species of flowering plant

Platanthera finetiana is a species of plant in the family Orchidaceae. It is endemic to China.
