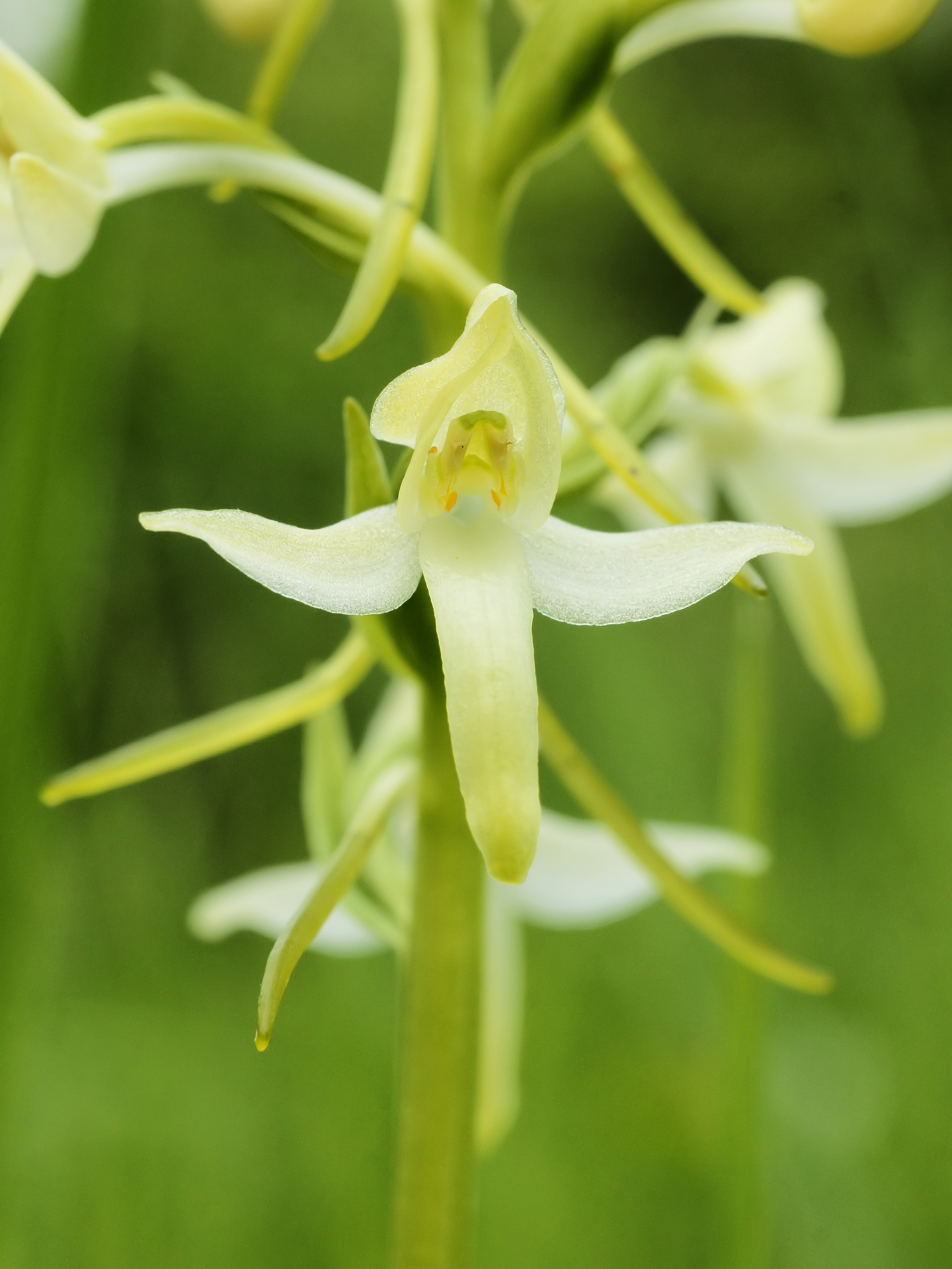
- Platanthera bifolia

Scientific classification
- Kingdom: Plantae
- Clade: Embryophytes
- Clade: Tracheophytes
- Clade: Angiosperms
- Clade: Monocots
- Order: Asparagales
- Family: Orchidaceae
- Subfamily: Orchidoideae
- Tribe: Orchideae
- Subtribe: Orchidinae
- Genus: Platanthera; Rich.

Type species
- Platanthera bifolia (L.) Rich.

Synonyms
- Lysias Salisb.; Sieberia Spreng.; Mecosa Blume; Tulotis Raf.; Perularia Lindl.; Blephariglottis Raf.; Conopsidium Wallr.; Diphylax Hook.f.; Limnorchis Rydb.; Lysiella Rydb.; Gymnadeniopsis Rydb. in N.L.Britton; Piperia Rydb.; Denslovia Rydb.; Pseudodiphryllum Nevski in V.L.Komarov; Fimbriella Farw. ex Butzin

= Platanthera =

Genus of flowering plants in the orchid family

The genus Platanthera belongs to the subfamily Orchidoideae of the family Orchidaceae, and comprises about 150 species of orchids. The members of this genus, known as the butterfly orchids or fringed orchids, were previously included in the genus Orchis, which is a close relative (along with the genus Habenaria). They are distributed throughout the temperate regions of the Northern Hemisphere. They are terrestrial and have tubercules. The genomes of Platanthera zijinensis and Platanthera guangdongensis have been sequenced as model species to study partial and full mycoheterotrophy.

== Etymology ==
Louis Claude Richard chose the name Platanthera for this genus; it comes from the Greek and means 'broad or wide anther', referring to the separation of the base of the pollinia in the type species of the genus. Richard felt that this characteristic distinguished the genus Platanthera from both the genus Orchis and the genus Habenaria. However, today the defining characteristics of the genus are generally accepted to be the absence of both stigmatic processes (typical in Habenaria) and ovoid root-tuberoids (characteristic of both Habenaria and Orchis). Still, P. nivea, P. clavellata and P. integra all have stigmatic processes, showing the limitations of morphological characteristics in defining this clade.

== Description and habitat ==
Species of Platanthera are perennial terrestrial herbs, erect in habit. The roots are fasciculate and typically fleshy and slender, although they may be somewhat tuberous; if tuberous they are lanceolate to fusiform and not ovoid. The leaves are generally fleshy and range from oblong or ovoid to lanceolate. Leaf shape often varies with the lower leaves more ovoid in shape, progressively becoming more lanceolate as they progress up the scape; floral bracts, if present, are lanceolate to linear. The base of the leaves typically sheathes the stem. The inflorescence is terminal and solitary, and the flowers form a cylindrical spike that ranges from sparse to dense. The flowers are typically resupinate, and often showy and colorful. Petal colors range from purple, orange and yellow to green and white. The petals and labellum are typically entire, but in a number of North American species they may be fringed or edentate; in this group of species the labellum is also often deeply lobed or auricuate. The seed capsules are cylindrical and ridged.

These terrestrial orchids develop in a wide range of soil types and habitats, from strongly basic soils to deeply acidic bog soils, from forest openings and in clearings within the forest to open tundra and various wetland habitats.

Some Platanthera species are pollinated by mosquitoes.

== Species ==
Many species can cross-fertilise, resulting in great morphological variety and complicating classification.

The type species is Platanthera bifolia. More than 400 species, subspecies, and varieties have been described, and a 1997 study estimated around 85 species were clearly defined, though these quantities vary considerably between evolving classification systems, and naturally change as specimens are reanalyzed or newly acquired. "Species of Platanthera occur in North America, Asia, Europe, North Africa, Borneo, and Sarawak. Major centers of diversity are found in North America and East Asia."

The Plant List which tracks botanical names lists 152 accepted species names in the genus Platanthera as of 2022, along with 100s of infraspecific names.

They include:

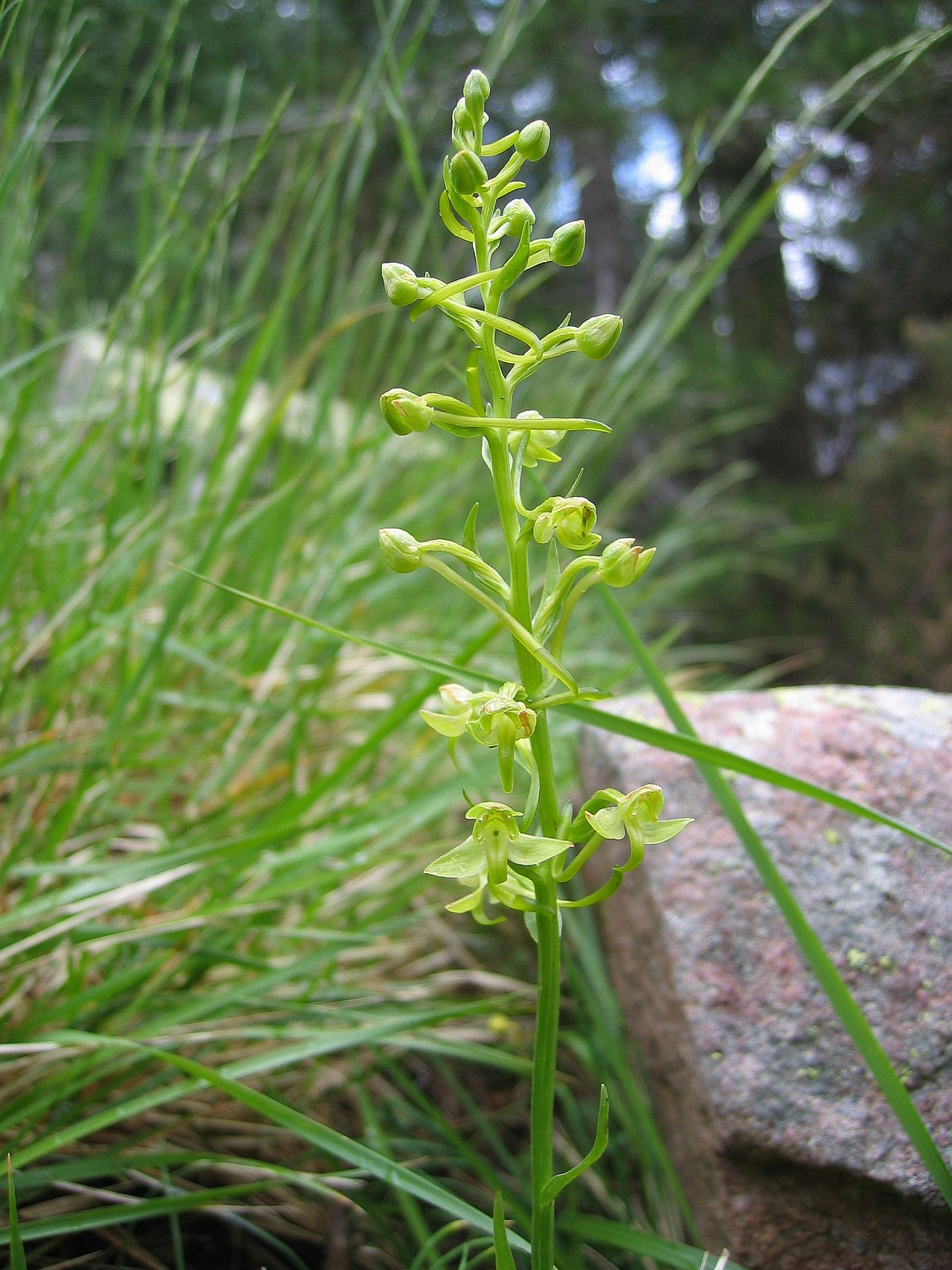
Platanthera algeriensis

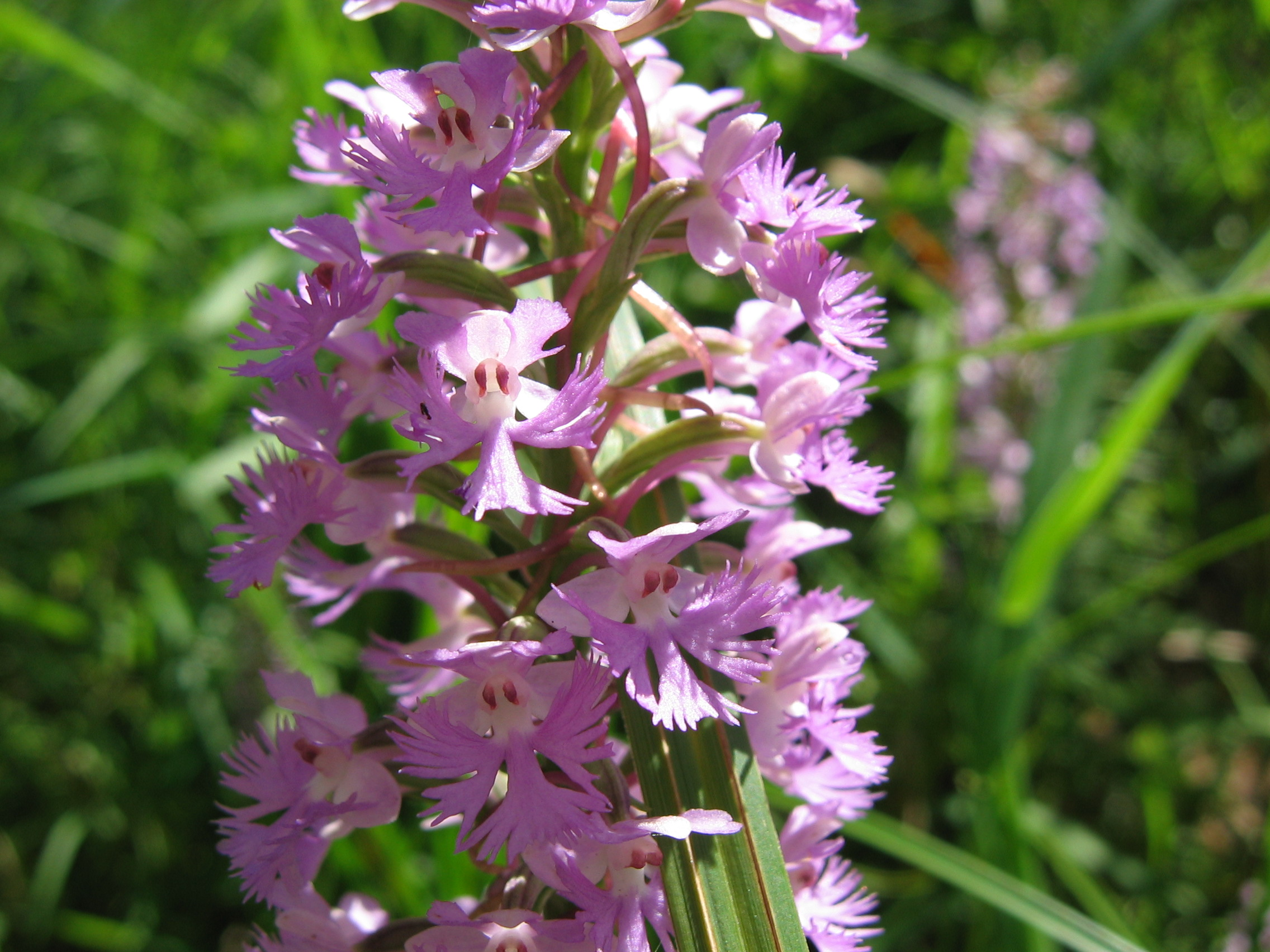
Platanthera psycodes

Species endemic to North America

- Platanthera aquilonis (North America)
- Platanthera blephariglottis (North America)
- Platanthera brevifolia (North America)
- Platanthera chapmanii (North America)
- Platanthera ciliaris (North America)
- Platanthera clavellata (North America)
- Platanthera colemanii (North America, endemic to California)
- Platanthera cooperi (North America)
- Platanthera cristata (North America)
- Platanthera dilatata (North America)
- Platanthera elegans (North America)
- Platanthera elongata (North America)
- Platanthera ephemerantha (North America)
- Platanthera flava (North America)
- Platanthera grandiflora (North America)
- Platanthera hookeri (North America)
- Platanthera huronensis (North America)
- Platanthera integra (North America)
- Platanthera integrilabia (North America)
- Platanthera lacera (North America)
- Platanthera leucophaea (North America)
- Platanthera leptopetala (North America)
- Platanthera michaelii (North America, endemic to California)
- Platanthera nivea (North America)
- Platanthera orbiculata (North America)
- Platanthera pallida (North America)
- Platanthera peramoena (North America)
- Platanthera praeclara (North America)
- Platanthera psycodes (North America)
- Platanthera purpurascens (North America)
- Platanthera shriveri (North America)
- Platanthera sparsiflora (North America)
- Platanthera stricta (North America)
- Platanthera tescamnis (North America)
- Platanthera transversa (North America)
- Platanthera unalascensis (North America)
- Platanthera yadonii (North America)
- Platanthera yosemitensis (North America)
- Platanthera zothecina (North America)

Other species native to North America

- Platanthera chorisiana (Asia, North America)
- Platanthera convallariifolia (Asia, North America)
- Platanthera hyperborea (North America, Europe)
- Platanthera obtusata (North America, Europe, Asia)
- Platanthera tipuloides (Asia, North America)

Other species native to Asia

- Platanthera bifolia – greater platanthera (Europe, Korea)
- Platanthera brevicalcarata (Asia)
- Platanthera calceoliformis (China)
- Platanthera carnosilabris (China)
- Platanthera deflexilabella (Asia)
- Platanthera finetiana (China)
- Platanthera florenti (Asia)
- Platanthera fuscensis – Asian platanthera (Asia, Korea)
- Platanthera holmboei (Asia, Europe)
- Platanthera hologlottis – white Asian platanthera (Asia, Korea)
- Platanthera japonica – East Asian platanthera (Asia, Korea)
- Platanthera mandarinorum – common Korean platanthera, baby Asian platanthera (Asia, Korea)
- Platanthera metabifolia (Asia)
- Platanthera minor – little platanthera (Asia, Korea)
- Platanthera okuboi (Asia)
- Platanthera ophrydioides – cloud Asian platanthera (Asia, Korea)
- Platanthera oreophila (China)
- Platanthera sachalinensis – big Asian platanthera (Asia, Korea)
- Platanthera stenochila X.H.Jin, Schuit., Raskoti & L.Q.Huang (Asia)
- Platanthera ussuriensis – Ussuri river platanthera (Asia, Korea)

Other species

- Platanthera algeriensis (Europe, North Africa)
- Platanthera azorica (Azores)
- Platanthera chlorantha (Europe)
- Platanthera kuenkelei (North Africa)
- Platanthera micrantha (Azores)
- Platanthera pollostantha (Azores)
