= List of Rosales of Montana =

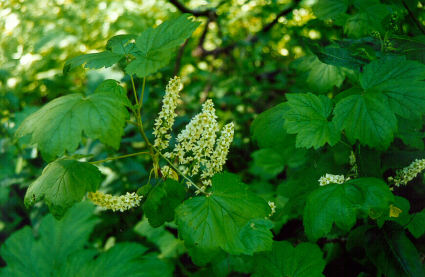
Northern black currant, Ribes hudsonianum

There are at least 191 members of the Rosales order found in Montana. Some of these species are exotics (not native to Montana) and some species have been designated as Species of Concern.

== Currants and gooseberries ==
Family: Grossulariaceae

- Ribes americanum, wild black currant
- Ribes aureum, golden currant
- Ribes cereum, wax currant
- Ribes hudsonianum, northern black currant
- Ribes inerme, white-stem gooseberry
- Ribes lacustre, bristly black currant
- Ribes laxiflorum, trailing black currant
- Ribes montigenum, alpine prickly gooseberry
- Ribes oxyacanthoides, Canada gooseberry
- Ribes oxyacanthoides subsp. hendersonii, Henderson's gooseberry
- Ribes oxyacanthoides subsp. irriguum, Idaho gooseberry
- Ribes oxyacanthoides subsp. setosum, bristly gooseberry
- Ribes rubrum, northern red currant
- Ribes triste, swamp red currant
- Ribes viscosissimum, sticky currant

== Greasebush ==
Family: Crossosomataceae

- Glossopetalon spinescens, spiny greasebush

== Hydrangea ==
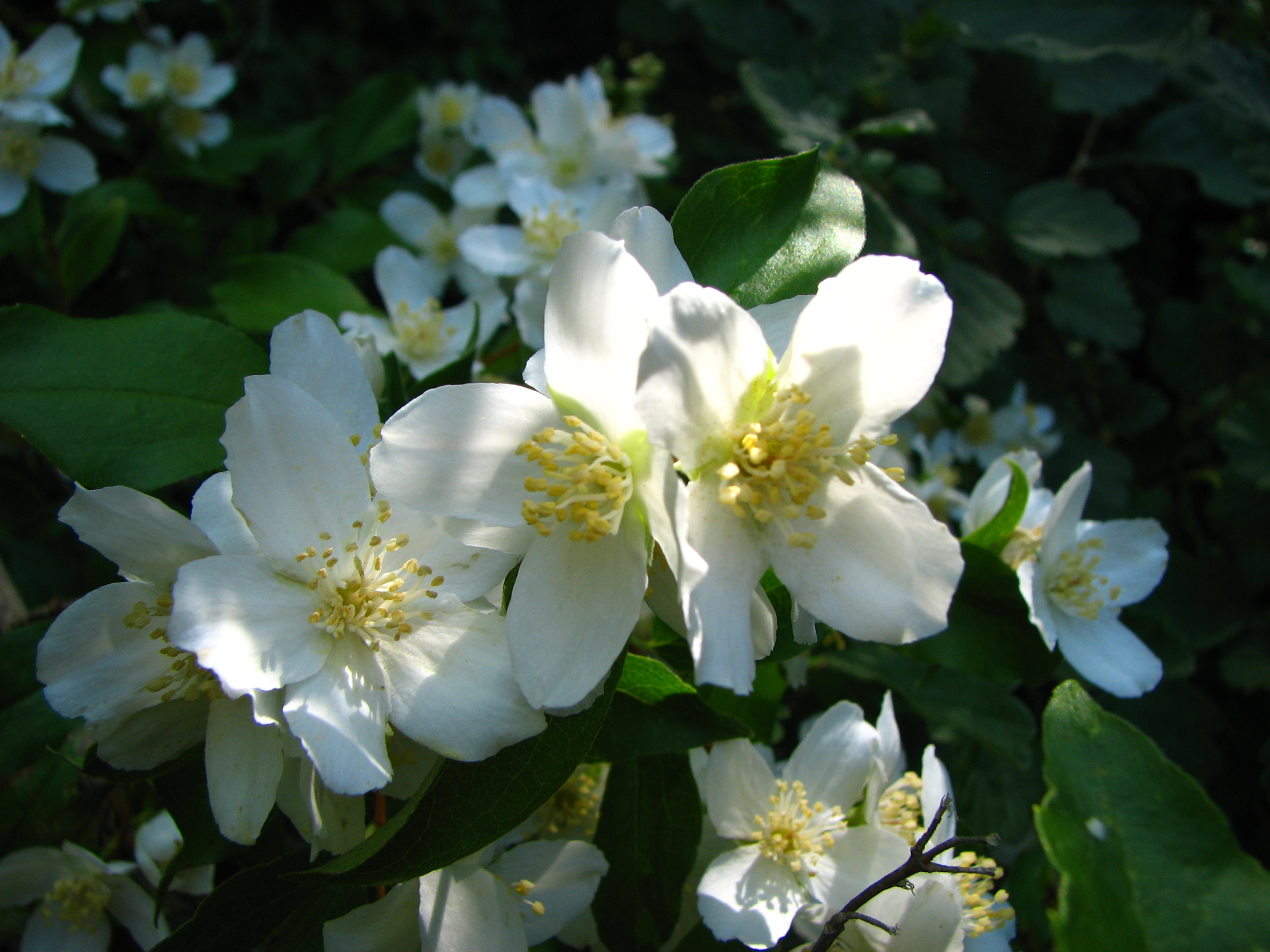
Lewis' mock orange, Philadelphus lewisii

Family: Hydrangeaceae

- Philadelphus lewisii, Lewis' mock orange

== Rose ==
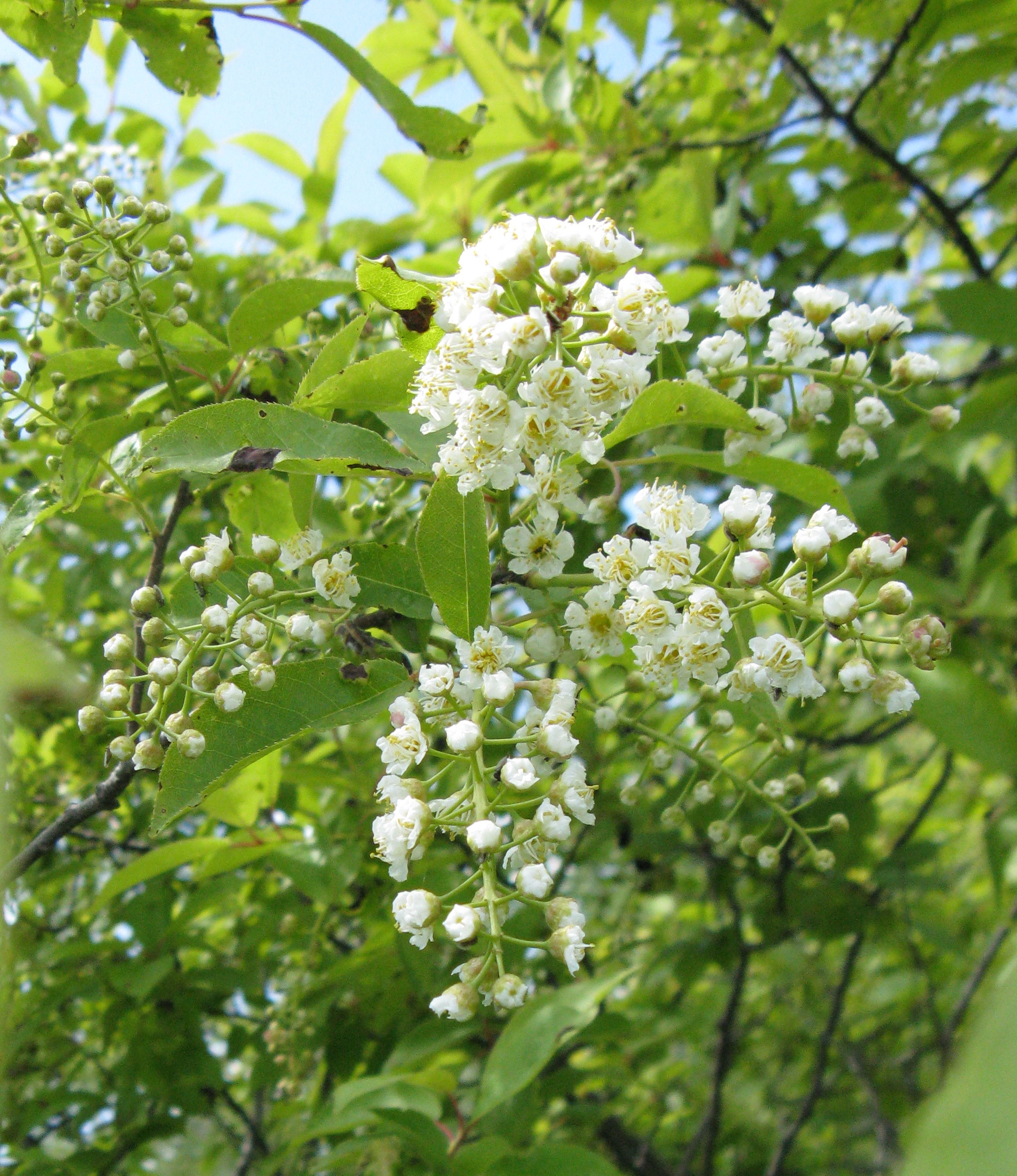
Chokecherry, Prunus virginiana

Family: Rosaceae

- Agrimonia gryposepala, tall hairy groovebur
- Agrimonia striata, woodland agrimony
- Alchemilla xanthochlora, common lady's-mantle
- Amelanchier alnifolia, Saskatoon serviceberry
- Amelanchier utahensis, Utah serviceberry
- Argentina anserina, silverweed cinquefoil
- Cercocarpus ledifolius, curl-leaf mountain-mahogany
- Cercocarpus montanus, alderleaf mountain-mahogany
- Chamaerhodos erecta, rose chamaerhodos
- Comarum palustre, marsh cinquefoil
- Crataegus castlegarensis, Castlegar hawthorn
- Crataegus chrysocarpa, fineberry hawthorn
- Crataegus douglasii, Douglas's hawthorn
- Crataegus macracantha, fleshy hawthorn
- Crataegus monogyna, English hawthorn
- Crataegus okanaganensis, Okanagan Valley hawthorn
- Crataegus okennonii, O'Kennon's hawthorn
- Crataegus phippsii, Phipps' hawthorn
- Crataegus suksdorfii, Suksdorf's hawthorn
- Crataegus williamsii, Williams' hawthorn
- Dryas drummondii, yellow mountain-avens
- Dryas integrifolia, entire-leaved avens
- Dryas octopetala, eight-petal mountain-avens
- Drymocallis fissa, big-flower cinquefoil
- Fragaria vesca, woodland strawberry
- Fragaria virginiana, Virginia strawberry
- Fragaria virginiana subsp. glauca
- Fragaria virginiana var. platypetala
- Geum aleppicum, yellow avens
- Geum canadense, white avens
- Geum macrophyllum, largeleaf avens
- Geum rivale, purple avens
- Geum rossii, Ross avens
- Geum rossii var. rossii, Ross avens
- Geum rossii var. turbinatum, slender-stemmed avens
- Geum triflorum, prairie-smoke
- Holodiscus discolor, cream-bush oceanspray
- Horkelia fusca, pine woods horkelia
- Ivesia gordonii, Gordon's ivesia
- Ivesia tweedyi, Tweedy's ivesia
- Kelseya uniflora, one-flower kelseya
- Luetkea pectinata, segmented luetkea
- Malus sylvestris, common crabapple
- Petrophytum caespitosum, caespitose rockmat
- Physocarpus malvaceus, mallow-leaf ninebark
- Physocarpus monogynus, mountain ninebark
- Potentilla argentea, silvery cinquefoil
- Potentilla arguta, tall cinquefoil
- Potentilla biennis, biennial cinquefoil
- Potentilla bipinnatifida, tansy cinquefoil
- Potentilla brevifolia, short-leaved cinquefoil
- Potentilla concinna, elegant cinquefoil
- Potentilla diversifolia, diverse-leaf cinquefoil
- Potentilla drummondii, Drummond's cinquefoil
- Potentilla flabellifolia, fan-leaf cinquefoil
- Potentilla fruticosa, shrubby cinquefoil
- Potentilla glandulosa, sticky cinquefoil
- Potentilla gracilis var. flabelliformis, slender cinquefoil
- Potentilla gracilis var. pulcherrima, soft cinquefoil
- Potentilla gracilis, fanleaf cinquefoil
- Potentilla hippiana, horse cinquefoil
- Potentilla hookeriana, Hooker's cinquefoil
- Potentilla hyparctica, low arctic cinquefoil
- Potentilla macounii, Macoun's cinquefoil
- Potentilla multisecta, featherleaf cinquefoil
- Potentilla nivea, snow cinquefoil
- Potentilla nivea var. pentaphylla, five-leaf cinquefoil
- Potentilla norvegica, Norwegian cinquefoil
- Potentilla ovina, sheep cinquefoil
- Potentilla paradoxa, bushy cinquefoil
- Potentilla pensylvanica, Pennsylvania cinquefoil
- Potentilla plattensis, Platte cinquefoil
- Potentilla recta, sulphur cinquefoil
- Potentilla rivalis, brook cinquefoil
- Potentilla rubricaulis, Rocky Mountain cinquefoil
- Potentilla uniflora, one-flowered cinquefoil
- Prunus americana, American plum
- Prunus cerasus, sour cherry
- Prunus emarginata, bitter cherry
- Prunus mahaleb, mahaleb cherry
- Prunus pensylvanica, pin cherry
- Prunus pumila, sand cherry
- Prunus virginiana, chokecherry
- Purshia tridentata, antelope bitterbrush
- Rosa acicularis, prickly rose
- Rosa arkansana, prairie rose
- Rosa blanda, smooth rose
- Rosa gymnocarpa, baldhip rose
- Rosa nutkana, Nootka rose
- Rosa woodsii, Woods' rose
- Rubus arcticus, nagoonberry
- Rubus discolor, Himalayan blackberry
- Rubus idaeus, red raspberry
- Rubus idaeus subsp. idaeus, American red raspberry
- Rubus idaeus subsp. strigosus, grayleaf red raspberry
- Rubus laciniatus, evergreen blackberry
- Rubus leucodermis, white-stemmed raspberry
- Rubus parviflorus, thimbleberry
- Rubus pedatus, five-leaf dwarf bramble
- Rubus pubescens, dwarf red raspberry
- Rubus ursinus, Pacific blackberry
- Sanguisorba annua, prairie burnet
- Sanguisorba minor, salad burnet
- Sibbaldia procumbens, creeping sibbaldia
- Sorbus aucuparia, European mountain-ash
- Sorbus scopulina, greene's mountain-ash
- Sorbus sitchensis, Sitka mountain-ash
- Spiraea betulifolia, white spirea
- Spiraea douglasii, Douglas spiraea
- Spiraea splendens, rose meadowsweet
- Spiraea × pyramidata, pyramidal spiraea
- Waldsteinia idahoensis, Idaho barren strawberry

== Saxifrage ==
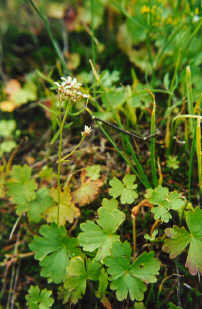
Buttercup-leaf suksdorfia, Suksdorfia ranunculifolia

Family: Saxifragaceae

- Boykinia major, mountain boykinia
- Chrysosplenium tetrandrum, northern golden-carpet
- Conimitella williamsii, William's conimitella
- Heuchera cylindrica, poker alumroot
- Heuchera cylindrica var. cylindrica, poker alumroot
- Heuchera cylindrica var. glabella, beautiful alumroot
- Heuchera grossulariifolia, gooseberry-leaf alumroot
- Heuchera parvifolia, littleleaf alumroot
- Heuchera richardsonii, Richardson's alumroot
- Leptarrhena pyrolifolia, leather-leaf saxifrage
- Lithophragma glabrum, bulbous woodland-star
- Lithophragma parviflorum, small-flower woodland-star
- Lithophragma tenellum, slender woodland-star
- Micranthes apetala, tiny swamp saxifrage
- Micranthes ferruginea, rusty-hair saxifrage
- Micranthes idahoensis, Idaho saxifrage
- Micranthes lyallii, red-stemmed saxifrage
- Micranthes nidifica, peak saxifrage
- Micranthes nivalis, alpine saxifrage
- Micranthes occidentalis, western saxifrage
- Micranthes odontoloma, streambank saxifrage
- Micranthes oregana, bog saxifrage
- Micranthes rhomboidea, diamondleaf saxifrage
- Micranthes subapetala, Yellowstone saxifrage
- Micranthes tempestiva, storm saxifrage
- Mitella breweri, feathery mitrewort
- Mitella caulescens, creeping mitrewort
- Mitella nuda, naked mitrewort
- Mitella pentandra, fivestamen mitrewort
- Mitella stauropetala, side-flower mitrewort
- Mitella trifida, Pacific mitrewort
- Parnassia fimbriata, fringed grass-of-parnassus
- Parnassia kotzebuei, Kotzebue's grass-of-parnassus
- Parnassia palustris, marsh grass-of-parnassus
- Parnassia palustris var. montanensis, mountain grass-of-parnassus
- Parnassia palustris var. parviflora, smallflower grass-of-parnassus
- Saxifraga adscendens, ascending saxifrage
- Saxifraga bronchialis, matte saxifrage
- Saxifraga cernua, nodding saxifrage
- Saxifraga cespitosa, tufted saxifrage
- Saxifraga chrysantha, golden saxifrage
- Saxifraga flagellaris, spider saxifrage
- Saxifraga hirculus, yellow marsh saxifrage
- Saxifraga hyperborea, pygmy saxifrage
- Saxifraga mertensiana, Mertens' saxifrage
- Saxifraga oppositifolia, purple mountain saxifrage
- Saxifraga rivularis, alpine brook saxifrage
- Saxifraga tolmiei, Tolmie saxifrage
- Suksdorfia ranunculifolia, buttercup-leaf suksdorfia
- Suksdorfia violacea, violet suksdorfia
- Sullivantia hapemanii, Wyoming sullivantia
- Telesonix heucheriformis, false saxifrage
- Tellima grandiflora, large fringe-cup
- Tiarella trifoliata, lace foam-flower

== Stonecrops ==
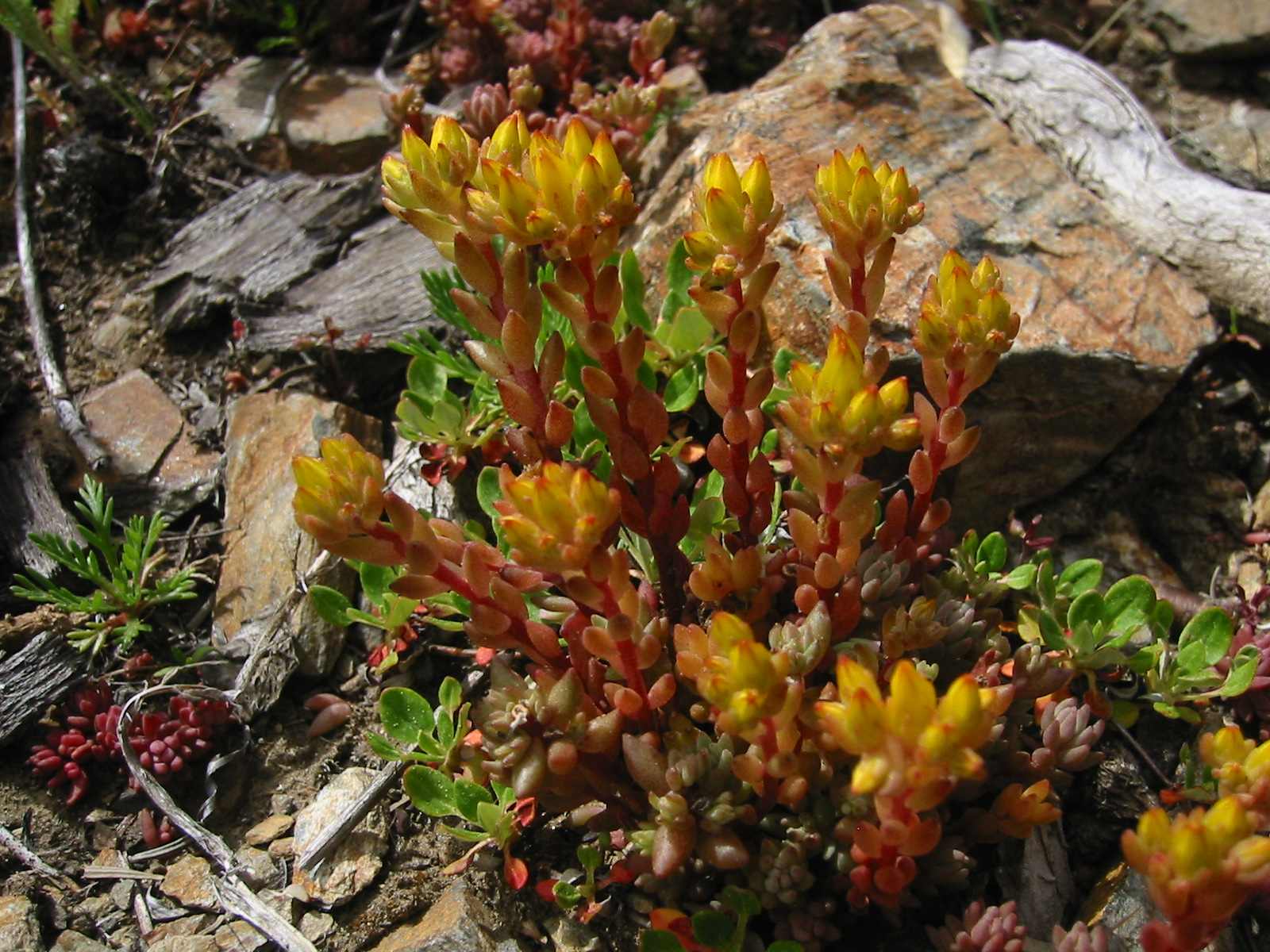
Lanceleaf stonecrop, Sedum lanceolatum

Family: Crassulaceae

- Sedum acre, gold-moss
- Sedum debile, weak-stemmed stonecrop
- Sedum integrifolium, entire-leaf stonecrop
- Sedum lanceolatum, lanceleaf stonecrop
- Sedum leibergii, Borsch's stonecrop
- Sedum rhodanthum, red-pod stonecrop
- Sedum stenopetalum, narrow-petal stonecrop
- Tillaea aquatica, water pigmy-weed

== See also ==
- List of dicotyledons of Montana
