= Alpine saxifrage =

Alpine saxifrage is a common name for several different plants and may refer to:

- In Eurasia, it usually means Micranthes nivalis (Snow saxifrage)
- In North America, it usually means Micranthes nidifica (Peak saxifrage)
- One of the common names of Saxifraga paniculata is alpine saxifrage
- Alpine saxifrage is a common name for Saxifraga gaspensis

== See also ==
- Saxifraga
