= S. nivalis =

S. nivalis may refer to:

- Sagina nivalis, a pearlwort species
- Salix nivalis, a willow species
- Saxifraga nivalis, a saxifrage species
