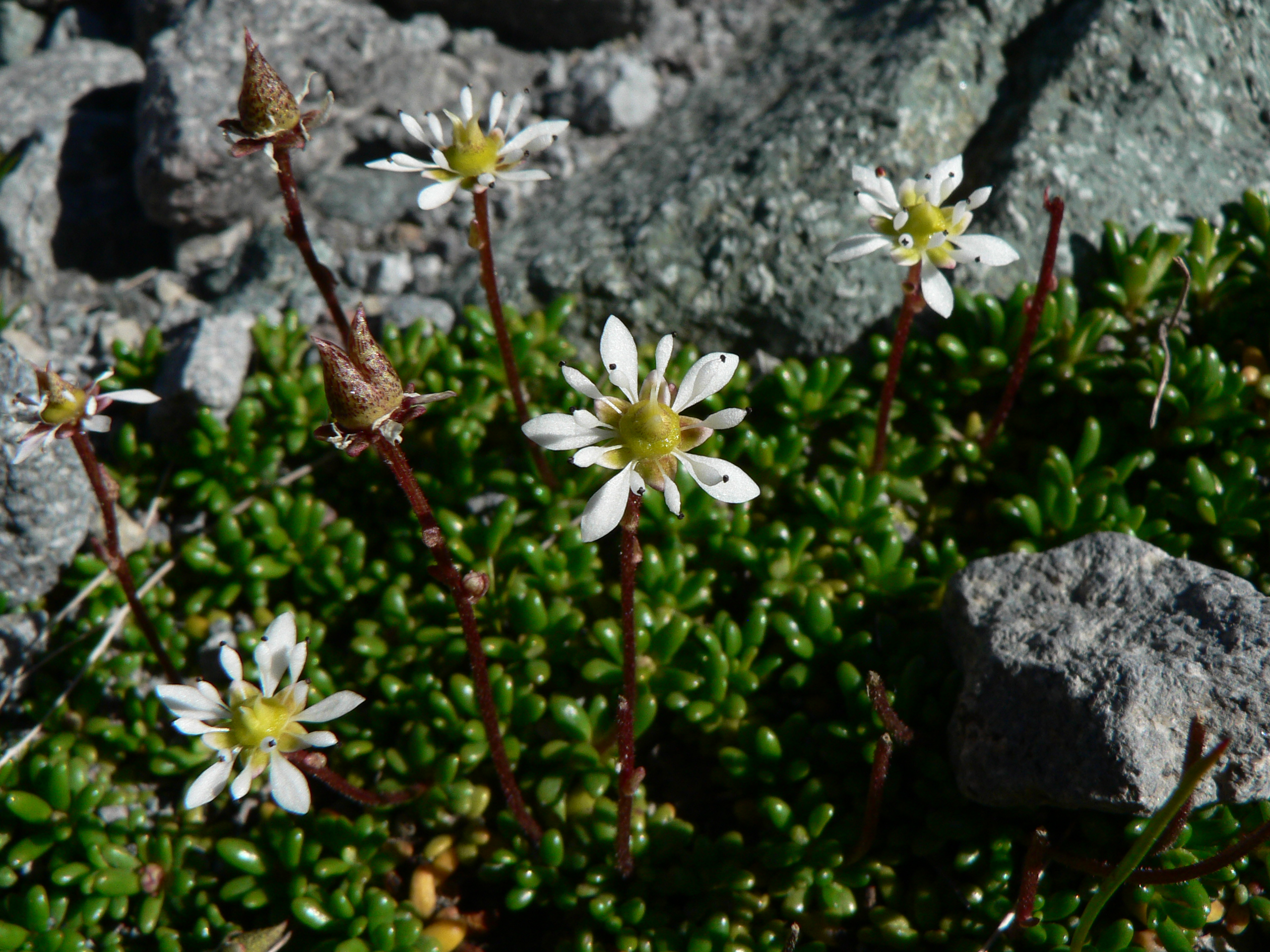
- Micranthes tolmiei

Scientific classification
- Kingdom: Plantae
- Clade: Embryophytes
- Clade: Tracheophytes
- Clade: Spermatophytes
- Clade: Angiosperms
- Clade: Eudicots
- Order: Saxifragales
- Family: Saxifragaceae
- Genus: Micranthes; Haw.

Type species
- Micranthes semipubescens Haw.

Synonyms
- List: Aulaxis Haw.; Dermasea Haw.; Heterisia Raf.; Hexaphoma Raf.; Hydatica Neck.; Ocrearia Small; Spatularia Haw.; Steiranisia Raf.

= Micranthes =

Genus of flowering plants

Micranthes is a genus of flowering plants in the saxifrage family. It was formerly included within the genus Saxifraga until DNA evidence from 1996 showed the members of what is now Micranthes are more closely related to Boykinia and Heuchera than to other members of the genus Saxifraga.

All members of this genus are herbaceous, with prominent basal leaves. They are found in temperate, arctic, and alpine regions of North America and Eurasia.

== Species ==
The following species are recognised in the genus Micranthes:

- Micranthes apetala (Piper) Small
- Micranthes aprica (Greene) Small – Sierra saxifrage
- Micranthes astilboides (Losinsk.) Tkach
- Micranthes atrata Losinsk.
- Micranthes brachypetala (Malyschev) Tkach
- Micranthes bryophora (A.Gray) Brouillet & Gornall
- Micranthes californica (Greene) Small
- Micranthes calycina (Sternb.) Gornall & H.Ohba
- Micranthes careyana (A.Gray) Small
- Micranthes caroliniana (A.Gray) Small
- Micranthes cismagadanica (Malyschev) Tkach
- Micranthes clavistaminea Losinsk.
- Micranthes clusii (Gouan) Fern.Prieto, Vázquez, Vallines & Cires
- Micranthes davidii (Franch.) Losinsk.
- Micranthes davurica (Willd.) Small
- Micranthes divaricata Losinsk.
- Micranthes dungbooi (Engl. & Irmsch.) Gornall & H.Ohba
- Micranthes eriophora (S.Watson) Small
- Micranthes ferruginea (Graham) Brouillet & Gornall – Rustyhair saxifrage
- Micranthes foliolosa (R.Br.) Gornall – Leafy saxifrage
- Micranthes fragosa (Suksd. ex Small) Small
- Micranthes fusca (Maxim.) S.Akiyama & H.Ohba
- Micranthes gageana (W.W.Sm.) Gornall & H.Ohba
- Micranthes gaspensis (Fernald) Small – Gaspé saxifrage
- Micranthes gormanii (Suksd.) Brouillet & Gornall
- Micranthes hieraciifolia (Waldst. & Kit. ex Willd.) Haw. – Hawkweed-leaved saxifrage
- Micranthes hitchcockiana (Elvander) Brouillet & Gornall
- Micranthes howellii (Greene) Small
- Micranthes idahoensis (Piper) Brouillet & Gornall
- Micranthes integrifolia (Hook.) Small – Northwestern saxifrage
- Micranthes japonica (Boissieu) S.Akiyama & H.Ohba
- Micranthes kermodei (Harry Sm. ex Wadhwa) Gornall & H.Ohba
- Micranthes kikubuki (Ohwi) Tkach
- Micranthes laciniata (Nakai & Takeda) S.Akiyama & H.Ohba
- Micranthes lumpuensis (Engl.) Losinsk.
- Micranthes lyallii (Engl.) Small – Redstem saxifrage
- Micranthes manchuriensis (Engl.) Gornall & H.Ohba
- Micranthes marshallii (Greene) Small
- Micranthes melaleuca (Fisch. ex Spreng.) Losinsk.
- Micranthes melanocentra (Franch.) Losinsk.
- Micranthes merkii (Fisch. ex Sternb.) Elven & D.F.Murray
- Micranthes mertensiana (Bong.) Rosend.
- Micranthes mexicana (Engl. & Irmsch.) Brouillet & Gornall
- Micranthes micranthidifolia (Haw.) Small – Brook lettuce
- Micranthes nelsoniana (D.Don) Small – Heartleaf saxifrage
- Micranthes nidifica (Greene) Small – Peak saxifrage, Alpine saxifrage
- Micranthes nivalis (L.) Small – Snow saxifrage, Alpine saxifrage
- Micranthes nudicaulis (D.Don) Gornall & H.Ohba
- Micranthes oblongifolia (Nakai) Gornall & H.Ohba
- Micranthes occidentalis (S.Watson) Small – Western saxifrage
- Micranthes odontoloma (Piper) A.Heller – Streambank saxifrage
- Micranthes oregana (Howell) Small – Bog saxifrage
- Micranthes pallida (Wall. ex Ser.) Losinsk.
- Micranthes palmeri Bush – Palmer's saxifrage
- Micranthes paludosa (J.Anthony) Gornall & H.Ohba
- Micranthes parvula (Engl. & Irmsch.) Losinsk.
- Micranthes pensylvanica (L.) Haw. – Swamp saxifrage
- Micranthes petiolaris (Raf.) Bush
- Micranthes pluviarum (W.W.Sm.) Gornall & H.Ohba
- Micranthes pseudopallida (Engl. & Irmsch.) Losinsk.
- Micranthes punctata (L.) Losinsk.
- Micranthes purpurascens Kom.
- Micranthes razshivinii (Zhmylev) Brouillet & Gornall – Razshivin's saxifrage
- Micranthes redofskyi (Adams) Elven & D.F.Murray
- Micranthes reflexa (Hook.) Small – Yukon saxifrage
- Micranthes rhomboidea (Greene) Small – Diamondleaf saxifrage
- Micranthes rubriflora (Harry Sm.) Gornall & H.Ohba
- Micranthes rufidula Small – Redwool saxifrage
- Micranthes rufopilosa (Hultén) D.F.Murray & Elven
- Micranthes sachalinensis (F.Schmidt) S.Akiyama & H.Ohba
- Micranthes spicata (D.Don) Small – Spiked saxifrage
- Micranthes staminosa (Shlotg. & Vorosch.) Tkach
- Micranthes stellaris (L.) Galasso, Banfi & Soldano – Starry saxifrage, Star saxifrage
- Micranthes subapetala (E.Nelson) Small
- Micranthes svetlanae (Vorosch.) Tkach
- Micranthes tempestiva (Elvander & Denton) Brouillet & Gornall
- Micranthes tenuis (Wahlenb.) Small – Ottertail Pass saxifrage
- Micranthes texana (Buckley) Small – Texas saxifrage
- Micranthes tilingiana (Regel & Tiling) Kom.
- Micranthes tischii (Skelly) Brouillet & Gornall
- Micranthes tolmiei (Torr. & A.Gray) Brouillet & Gornall – Tolmie's saxifrage
- Micranthes unalaschcensis (Sternb.) Gornall & H.Ohba
- Micranthes virginiensis (Michx.) Small – Early saxifrage, Virginia saxifrage
- Micranthes zekoensis (J.T.Pan) Gornall & H.Ohba
