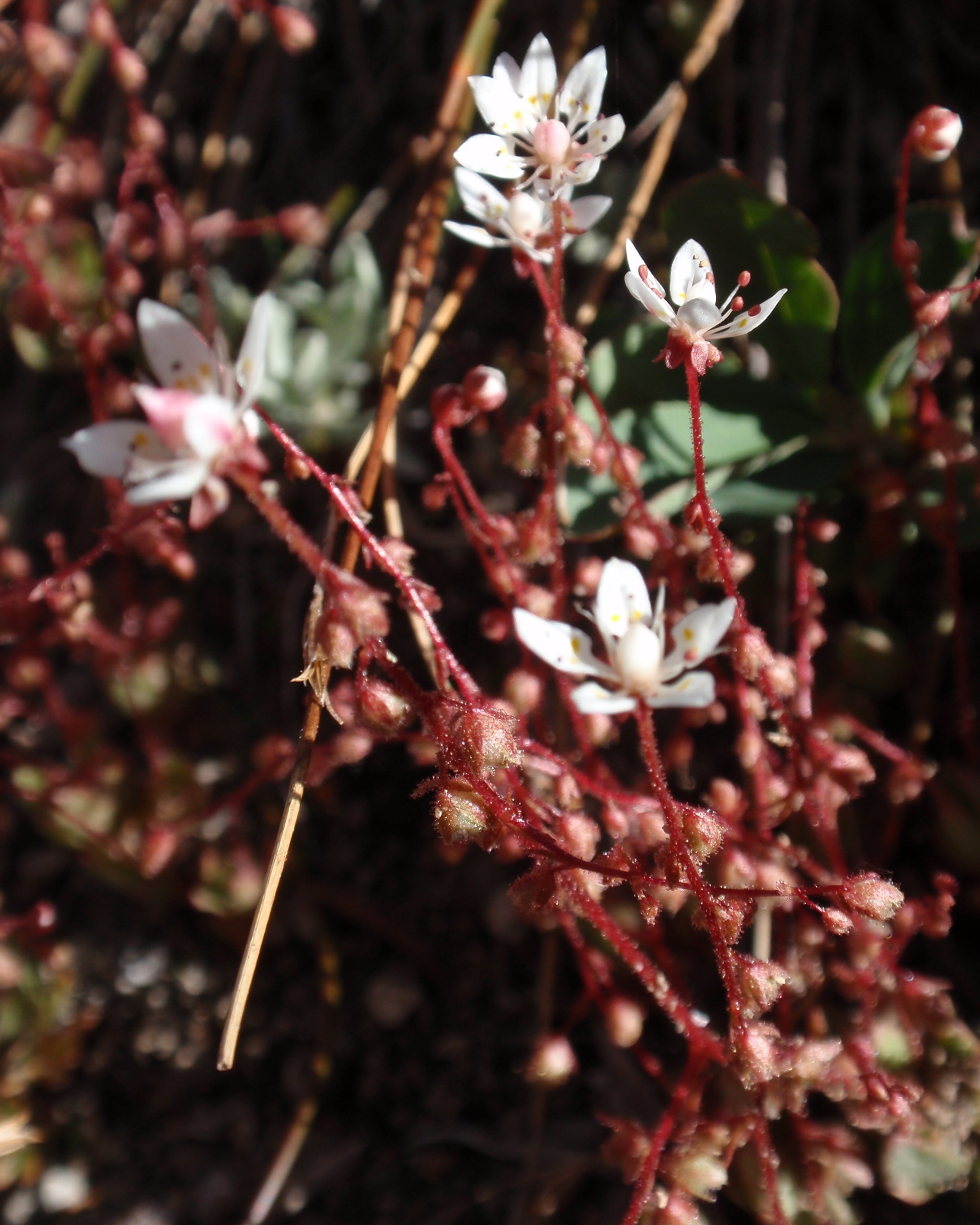
- Micranthes bryophora var. bryophora

Scientific classification
- Kingdom: Plantae
- Clade: Tracheophytes
- Clade: Angiosperms
- Clade: Eudicots
- Order: Saxifragales
- Family: Saxifragaceae
- Genus: Micranthes
- Species: M. bryophora

Binomial name
- Micranthes bryophora (A.Gray) Brouillet & Gornall

Synonyms
- Saxifraga bryophora A.Gray

= Micranthes bryophora =

Species of flowering plant

Micranthes bryophora is a species of flowering plant known by the common name bud saxifrage. It is native to the western United States, where its two varieties are geographically separated. The more common var. bryophora is endemic to the mountains of California, and the rare var. tobiasiae is known only from the Payette National Forest of western Idaho.

This plant is a perennial herb producing a basal rosette of fleshy, hairy, lance-shaped leaves up to 4 centimeters long. The inflorescence arises on a peduncle up to 25 centimeters tall with widely spaced flowers, each at the tip of a pedicel. The inflorescence also contains reproductive bulblets. Each flower has five spade-shaped petals which are white with two golden spots near the base. At the center are ten stamens tipped with red anthers.
