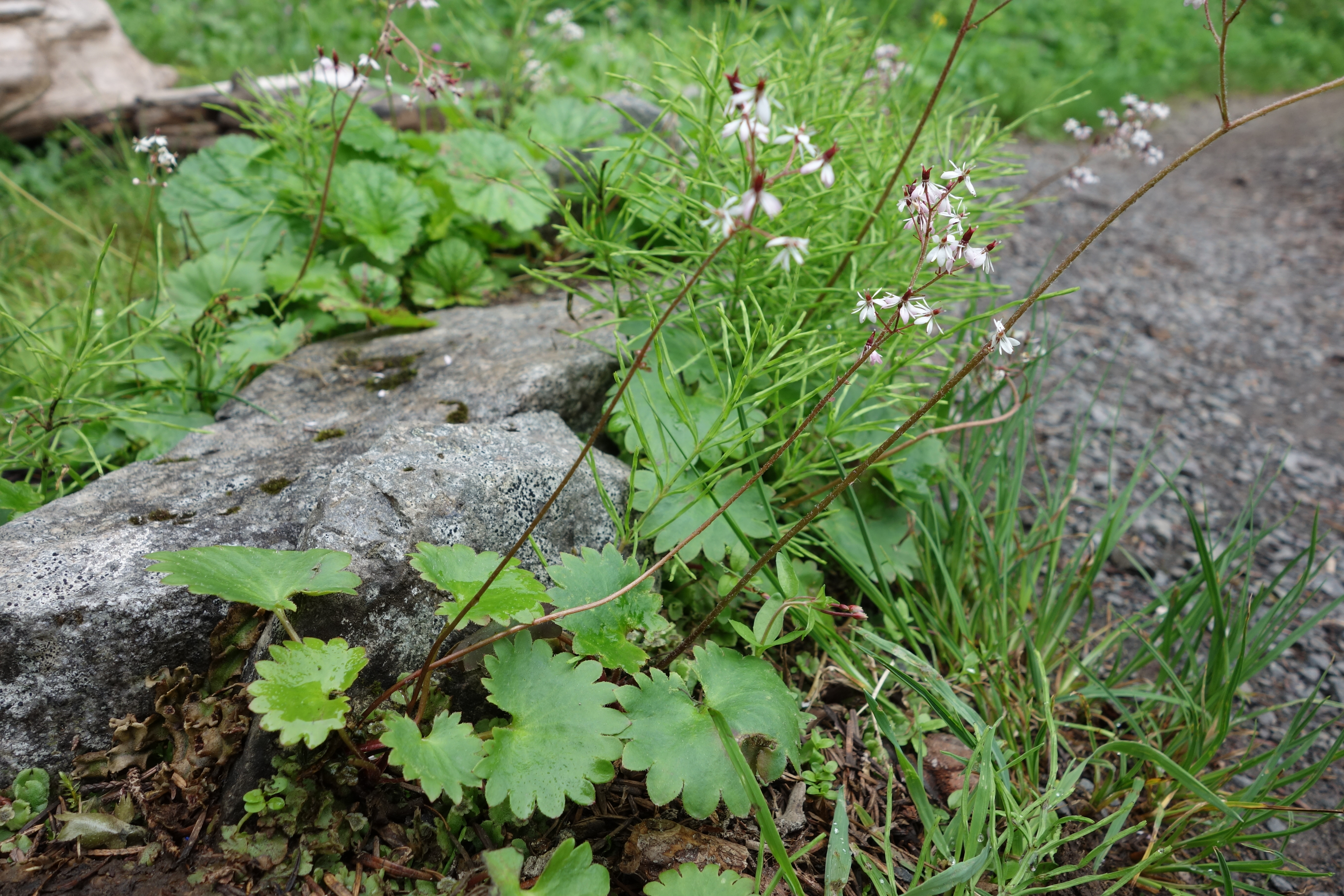

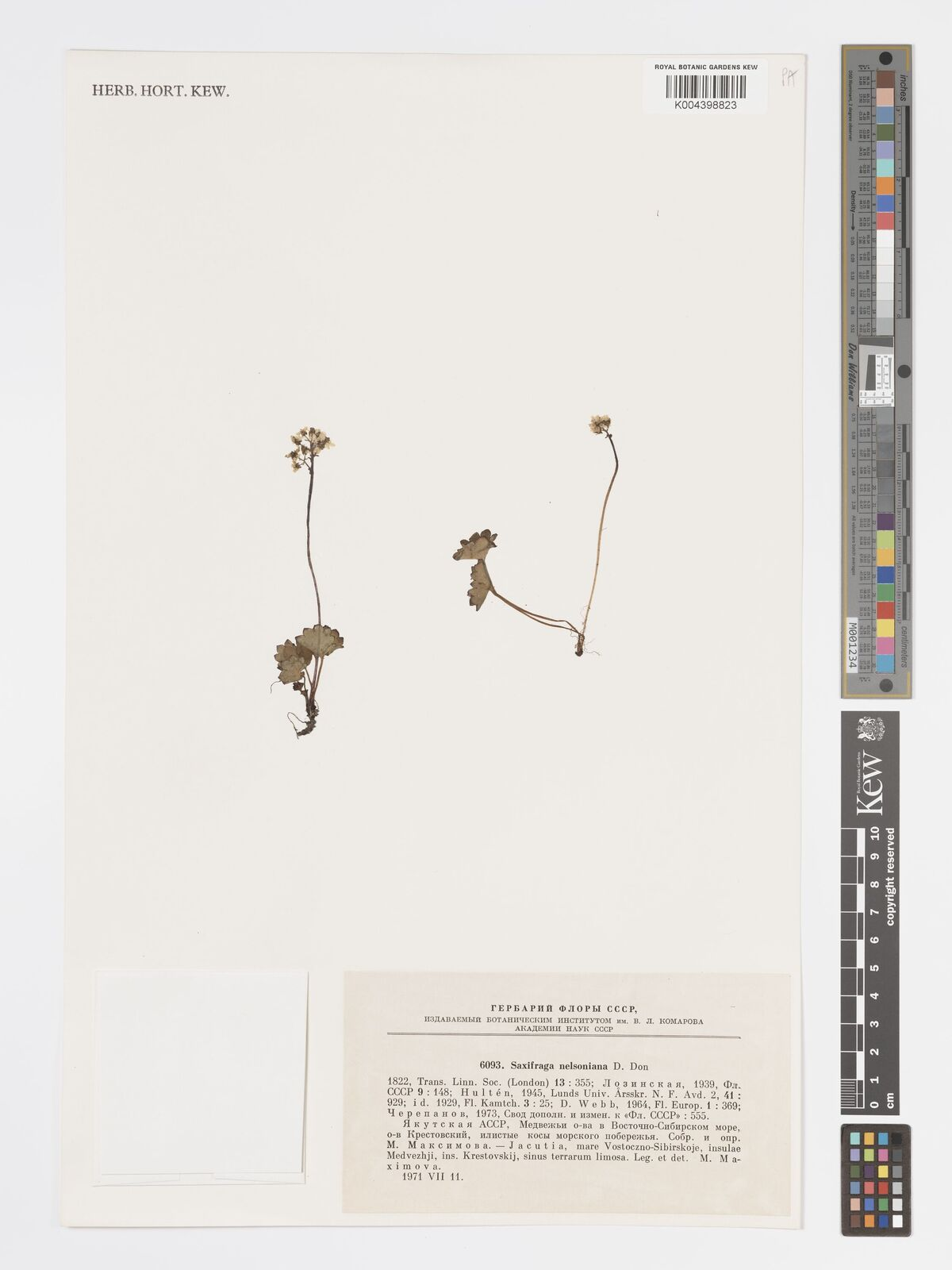

Scientific classification
- Kingdom: Plantae
- Clade: Tracheophytes
- Clade: Angiosperms
- Clade: Eudicots
- Order: Saxifragales
- Family: Saxifragaceae
- Genus: Micranthes
- Species: M. nelsoniana

Binomial name
- Micranthes nelsoniana (D.Don) Small

Synonyms
- List: Saxifraga denudata Nutt. ex Torr. & A.Gray; Saxifraga geum Pall.; Saxifraga nelsoniana subsp. carlottii (Calder & Savile) Hultén; Saxifraga punctata var. nelsoniana (D.Don) Macoun

= Micranthes nelsoniana =

Species of flowering plant

Micranthes nelsoniana, commonly known in the Pacific Northwest as heart leafed saxifrage, dotted rockfoil, or brooke saxifrage, is a perennial herbaceous plant native to northwestern North America, northern Asia, and northeastern Europe. It is found in rocky sub-alpine and alpine locations where water is present for at least part of the year. Leaves are edible, with young leaves eaten raw and older leaves cooked. Several subspecies and varieties exist, many of which have their own synonyms.
