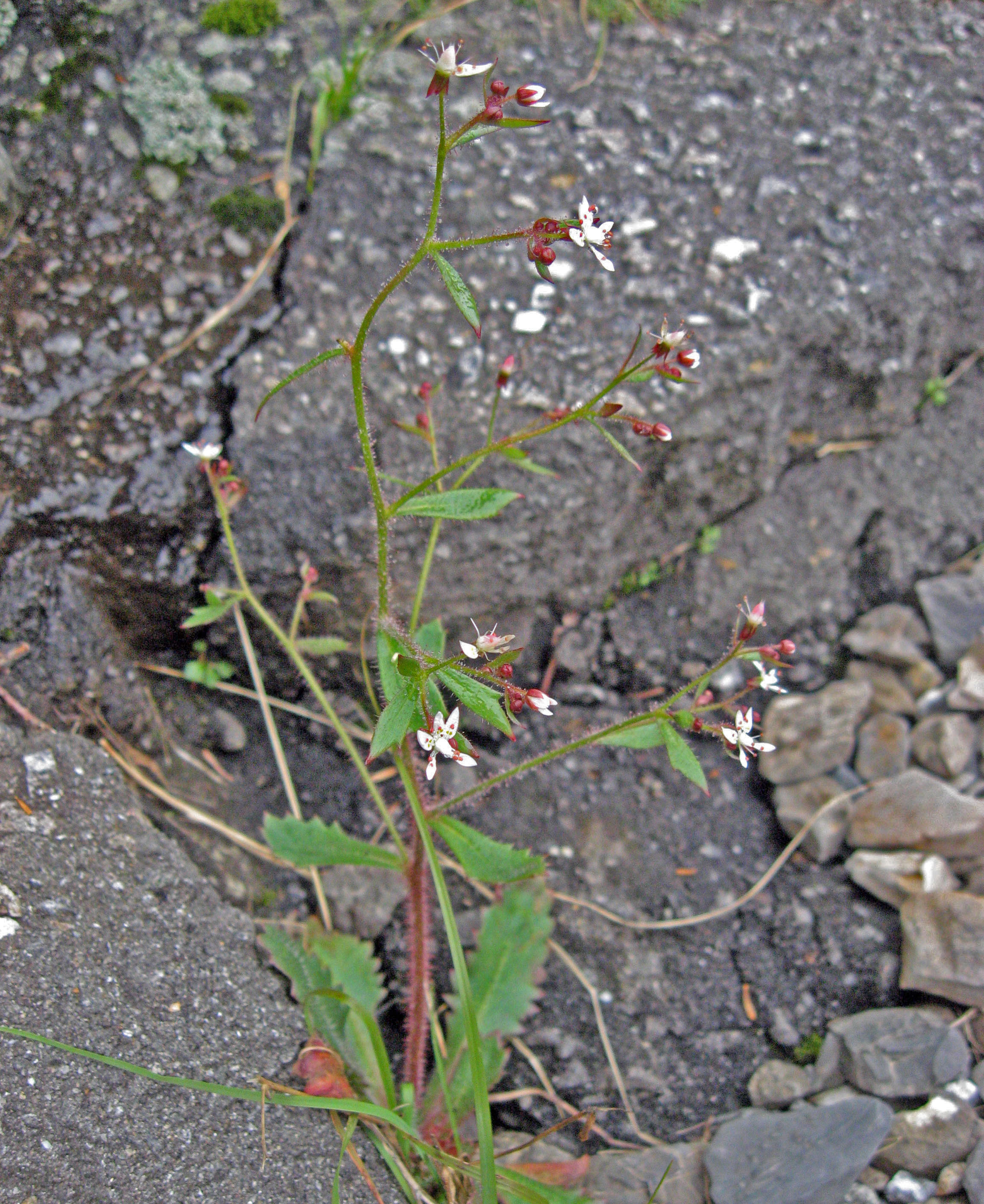

Scientific classification
- Kingdom: Plantae
- Clade: Tracheophytes
- Clade: Angiosperms
- Clade: Eudicots
- Order: Saxifragales
- Family: Saxifragaceae
- Genus: Micranthes
- Species: M. petiolaris

Binomial name
- Micranthes petiolaris Rafinesque

Synonyms
- Hydatica petiolaris Saxifraga michauxii

= Micranthes petiolaris =

Species of flowering plant

Micranthes petiolaris, commonly known as cliff saxifrage, is a species of flowering plant in the saxifrage family. It is native to the Southern Appalachian Mountains where it is found on exposed boulders and rocky seeps, often at high elevation. It is a perennial that produces small white flowers with yellow spots in the summer.

Recent genetic studies have shown is more closely related to arctic species of Micranthes than to the other species of the Southern Appalachians. This indicates that it did not evolve within the other southern Micranthes, but migrated to the southern Appalachians from the north, possibly during glacial periods.
