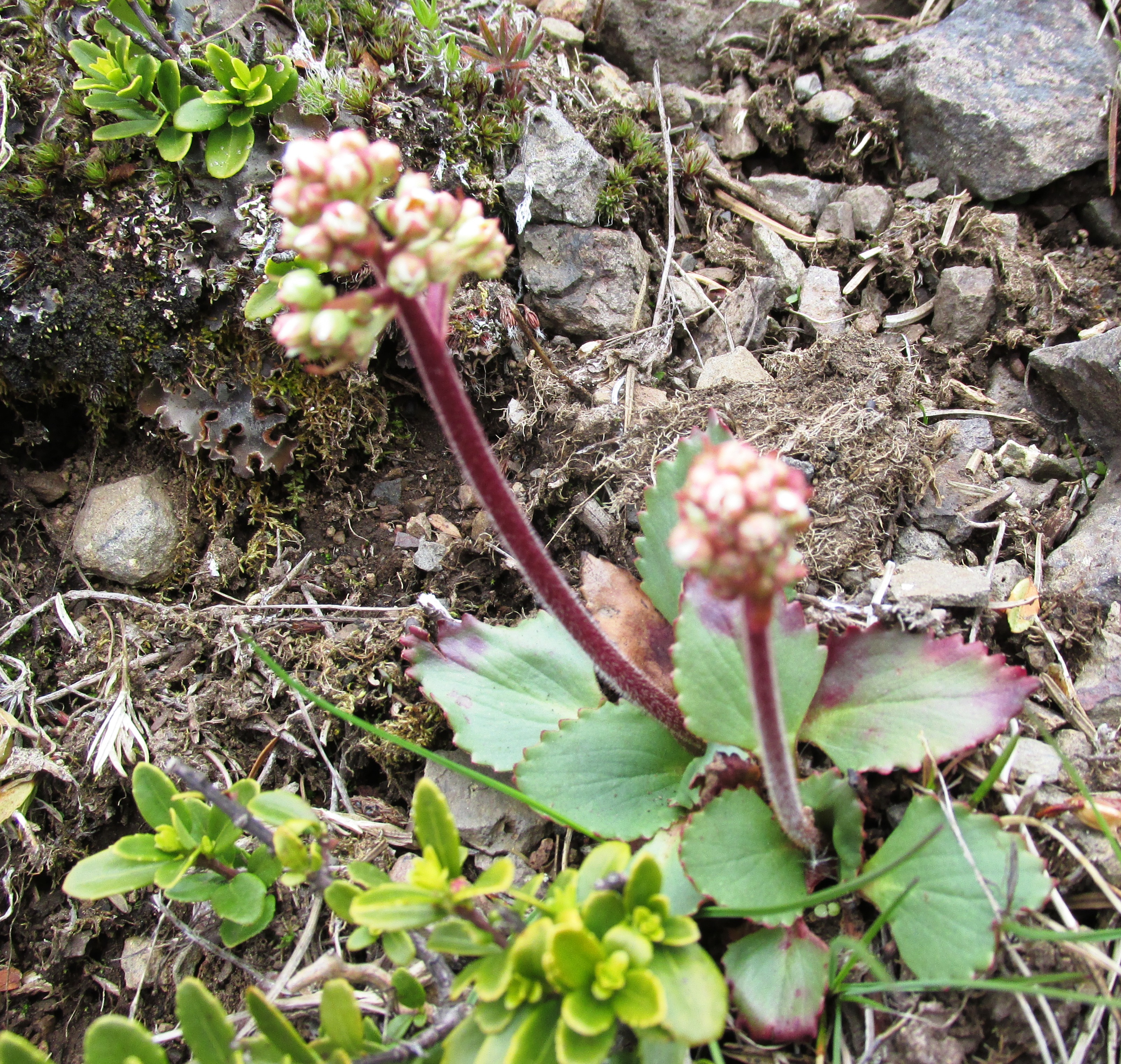

Scientific classification
- Kingdom: Plantae
- Clade: Tracheophytes
- Clade: Angiosperms
- Clade: Eudicots
- Order: Saxifragales
- Family: Saxifragaceae
- Genus: Micranthes
- Species: M. occidentalis

Binomial name
- Micranthes occidentalis (S.Watson) Small

= Micranthes occidentalis =

Western saxifrage

Species of flowering plant

Micranthes occidentalis, commonly known as western saxifrage, is a species of flowering plant native to North America.

== Description ==
Micranthes occidentalis is an herbaceous perennial, with three to five petoliate leaves in a rosette pattern at the base of the plant. Leaves are elliptic to oval, 3–8 cm long and 1–3 cm wide, with 15–30 teeth. Flowering stems, growing 10–25 cm tall, are leafless, glandular-hairy, and reddish in color

In May through August, stems grow clusters of small white or pinkish flowers, which are calyx cup-shaped. Flowers are five-lobed, each petal about 5 mm long, and stamens 10 mm. The inflorescence is glandular and pyramidal. Mature fruits are green to reddish-purple capsules 3–6 mm long.

Like many saxifrages, M. occidentalis forms several short rhizomes, and roots may grow bulblets.

Micranthes occidentalis can be distinguished from the closely related M. rufidula by its comparatively irregular tooth pattern, non-hairy leaves, and glandular (rather than flat) inflorescence.

== Naming ==
Genus Micranthes was previously grouped under Saxifraga, and many sources still refer to Micranthes occidentalis as Saxifraga occidentalis.

Micranthes occidentalis is also known as mountain saxifrage and redwool saxifrage, though the latter name is more commonly used for the closely related M. rufidula.

== Distribution ==
Occurring from New Mexico to as far north as Alaska and as far east as Montana, M. occidentalis is common in a variety of ecological conditions, including rocky slopes, meadows, and mossy openings. While it can be found in altitudes ranging from valleys to alpine, some accounts consider M. occidentalis to prefer higher altitudes, contributing to the common name "mountain saxifrage".
