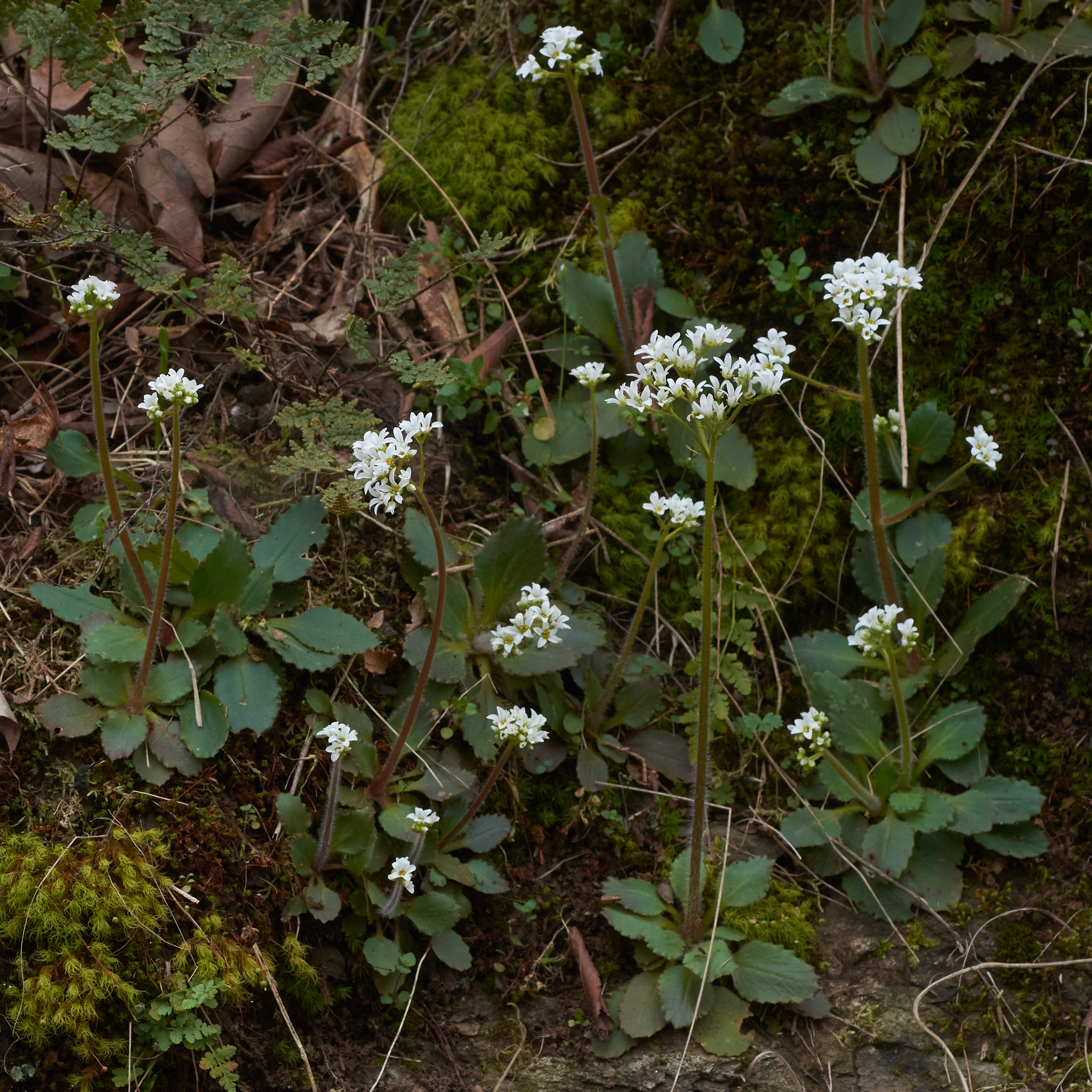

Conservation status
- Secure (NatureServe)

Scientific classification
- Kingdom: Plantae
- Clade: Tracheophytes
- Clade: Angiosperms
- Clade: Eudicots
- Order: Saxifragales
- Family: Saxifragaceae
- Genus: Micranthes
- Species: M. virginiensis

Binomial name
- Micranthes virginiensis (Michx.) Small

Synonyms
- Saxifraga virginica Nutt. (1818)

= Micranthes virginiensis =

Early saxifrage

Species of flowering plant

Micranthes virginiensis, the early saxifrage, or Virginia saxifrage, is a wildflower native to eastern North America Virginia saxifrage is a herbaceous plant. It can grow up to 30 cm (12 in) tall. André Michaux described the species in 1803.

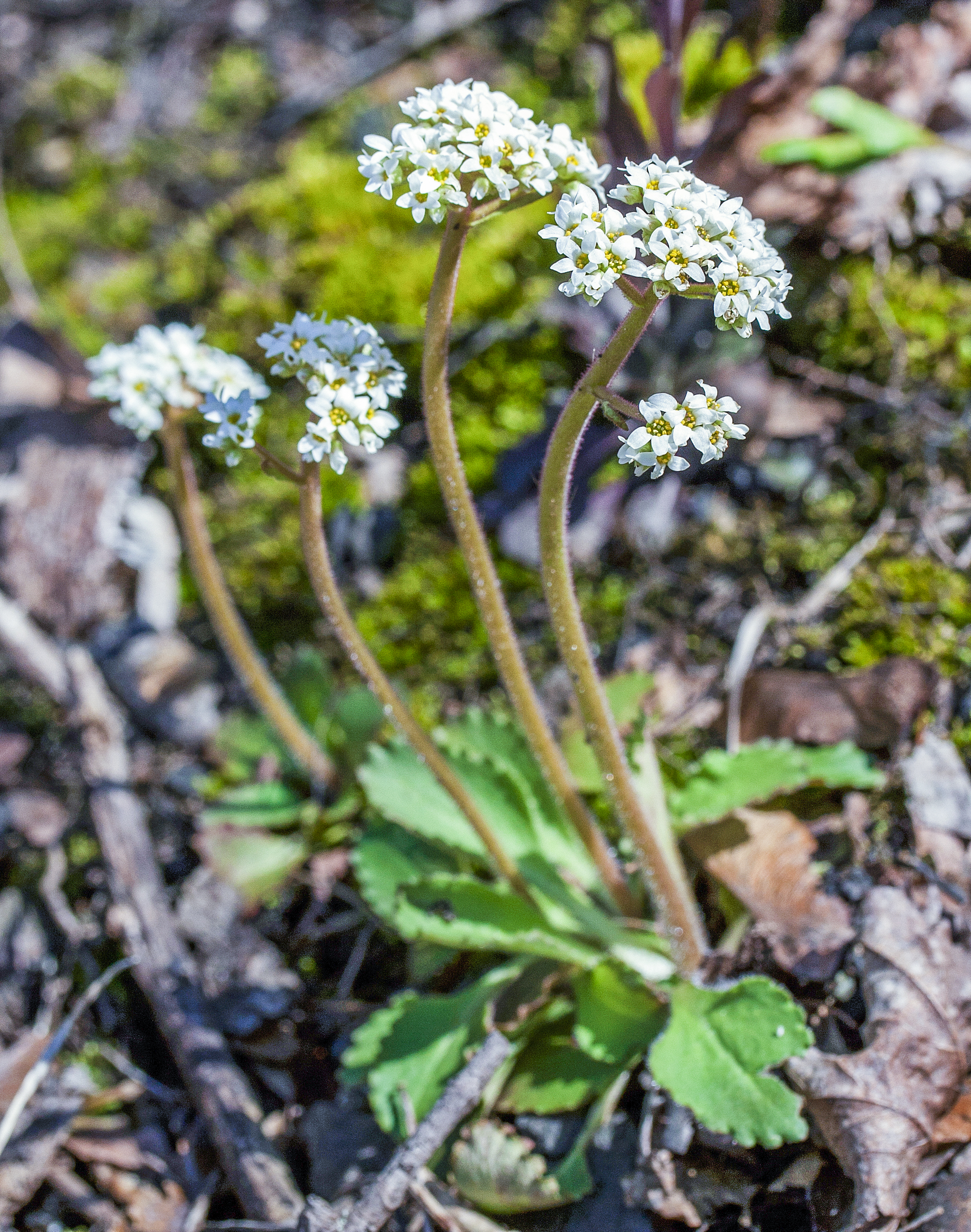
Virginia Saxifrage Micranthes virginiensis
