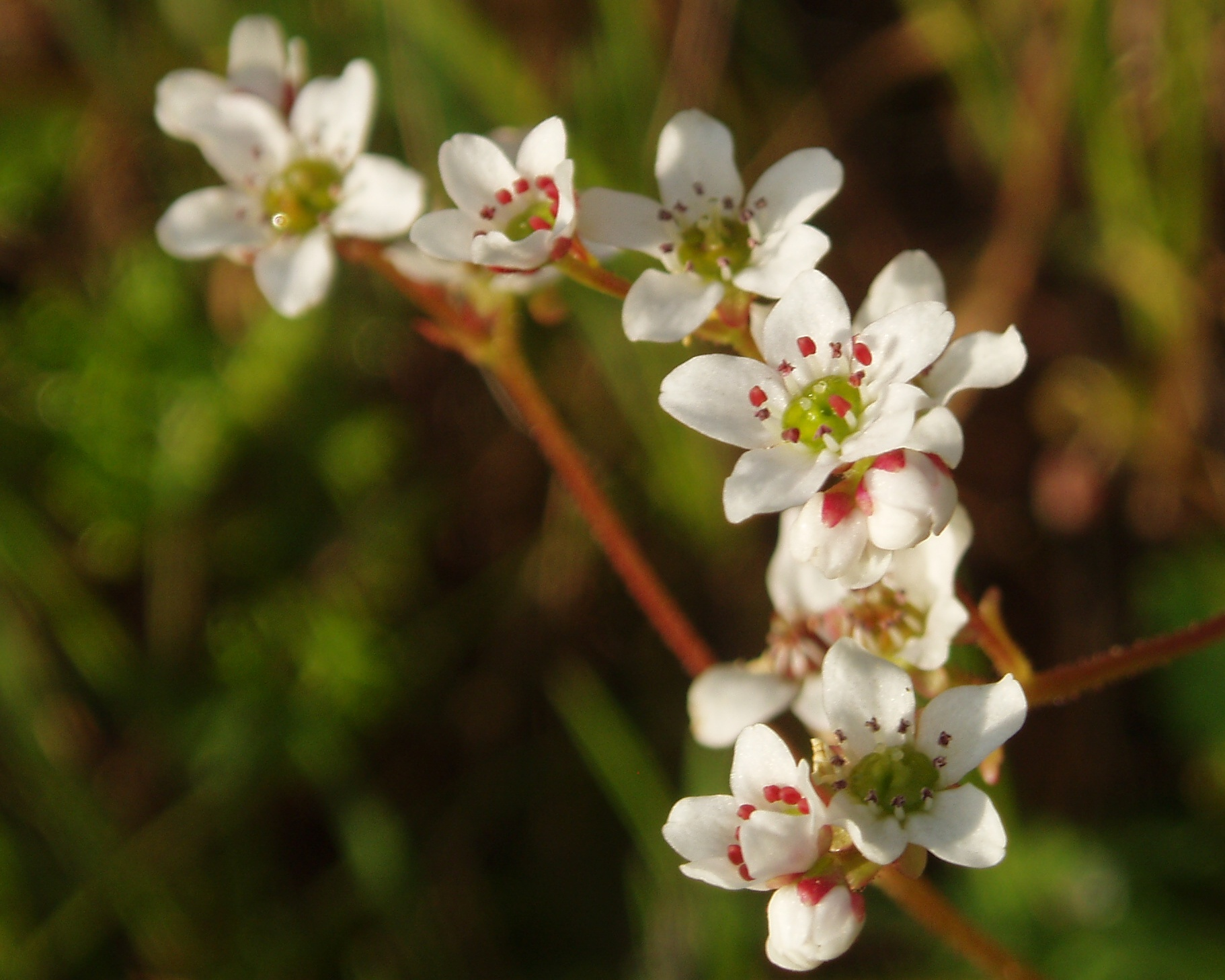

Scientific classification
- Kingdom: Plantae
- Clade: Tracheophytes
- Clade: Angiosperms
- Clade: Eudicots
- Order: Saxifragales
- Family: Saxifragaceae
- Genus: Micranthes
- Species: M. californica

Binomial name
- Micranthes californica (Greene) Small

Synonyms
- Saxifraga californica Greene

= Micranthes californica =

Species of flowering plant

Micranthes californica (syn: Saxifraga californica), known by the common name California saxifrage, is a species of flowering plants.

It is native to much of California west and north of the desert regions, as well as adjacent sections of southern Oregon and northern Baja California. It grows in many types of moist habitat from the coast to the mountains.

== Description ==
Micranthes californica is a perennial herb producing a small gray-green basal rosette of thick toothed oval leaves up to 10 centimeters long.

The inflorescence arises on a peduncle up to 35 centimeters tall bearing clusters of flowers, sometimes all on one side. Each flower has five green to reddish sepals, five small white petals, and ten stamens at the center.
