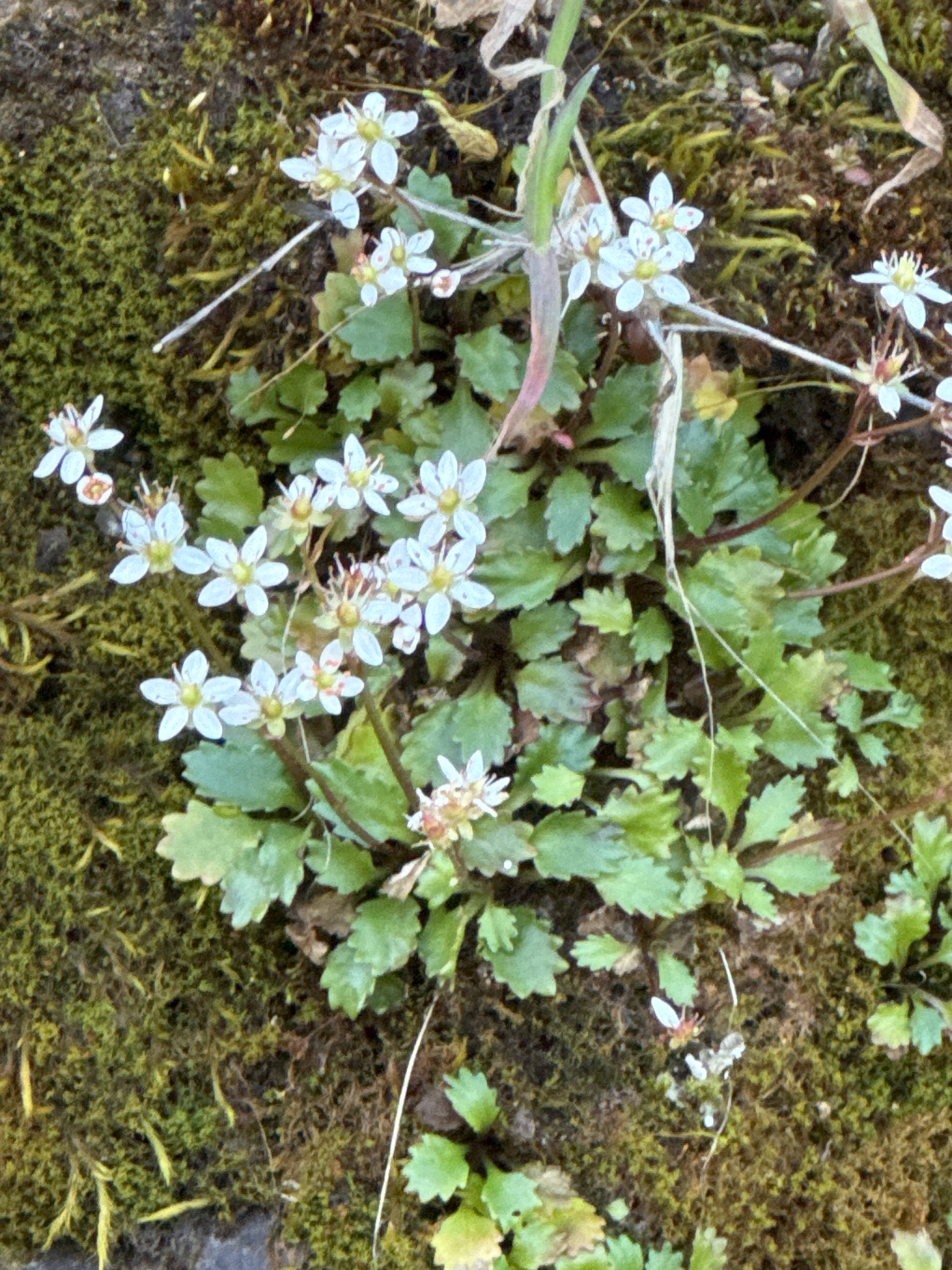

Scientific classification
- Kingdom: Plantae
- Clade: Tracheophytes
- Clade: Angiosperms
- Clade: Eudicots
- Order: Saxifragales
- Family: Saxifragaceae
- Genus: Micranthes
- Species: M. howellii

Binomial name
- Micranthes howellii (Greene) Small

= Micranthes howellii =

Species of flowering plant

Micranthes howellii (formerly Saxifraga howellii) is a species of saxifrage known by the common name Howell's saxifrage. It is endemic to the Klamath Mountains of southern Oregon and northern California, where it grows in moist, rocky habitat. It is a perennial herb growing from a caudex, usually with a rhizome system. It produces a basal rosette of leaves with rounded or oval blades edged with dull or sharp teeth or scalloping. Each leaf is up to 6 centimeters long, thick and fleshy, and borne on a short petiole. The inflorescence arises on an erect peduncle up to 20 centimeters tall. An array of branches bear several flowers with small white petals.
