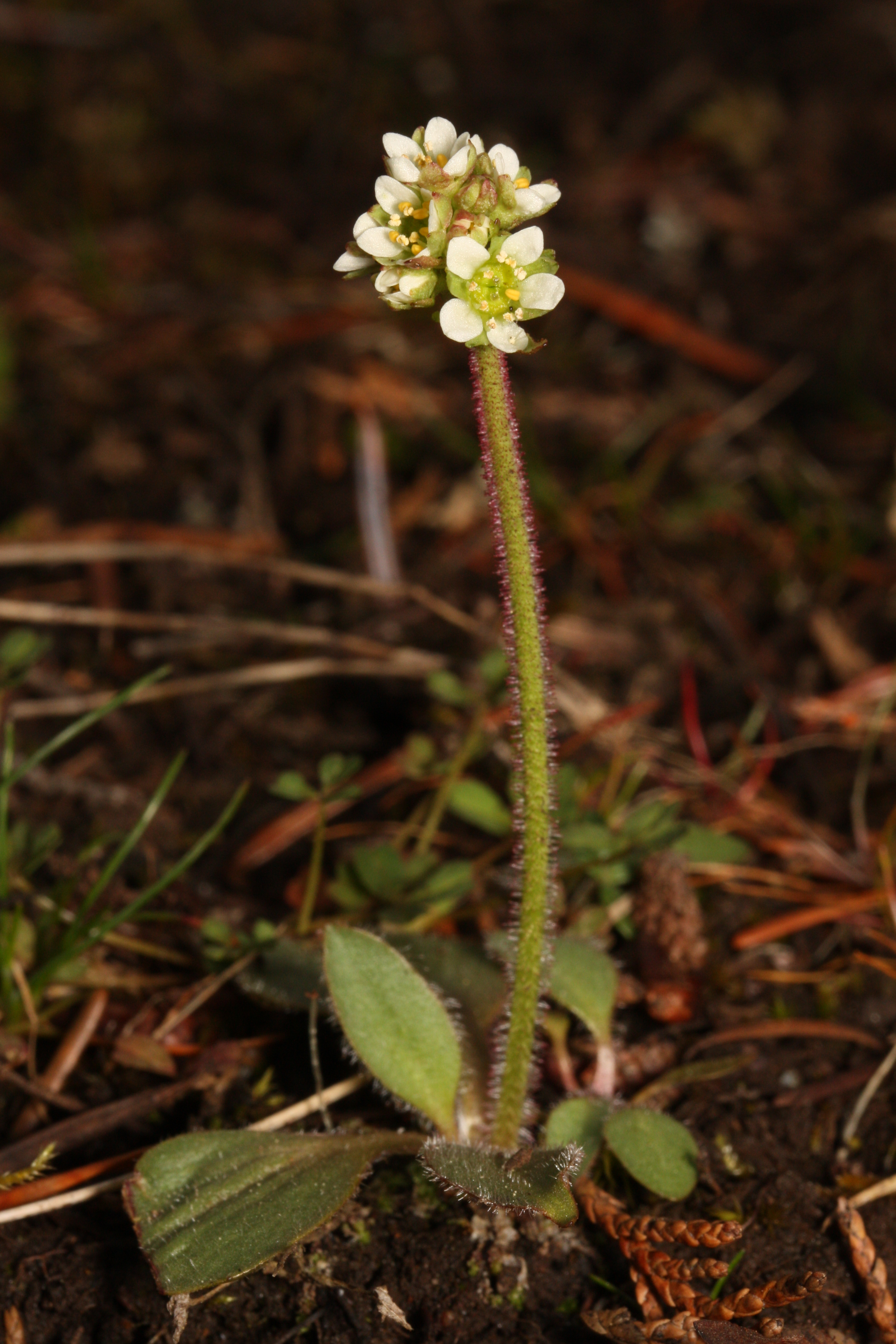

Scientific classification
- Kingdom: Plantae
- Clade: Tracheophytes
- Clade: Angiosperms
- Clade: Eudicots
- Order: Saxifragales
- Family: Saxifragaceae
- Genus: Micranthes
- Species: M. integrifolia

Binomial name
- Micranthes integrifolia (Hook.) Small

Synonyms
- Micranthes bidens Saxifraga integrifolia

= Micranthes integrifolia =

Species of flowering plant

Micranthes integrifolia is a species of flowering plant known by the common name wholeleaf saxifrage. It is native to western North America from British Columbia to Montana and northern California, where it grows in moist habitat, including meadows, prairies, and grassy mountain slopes. It is a perennial herb growing from a caudex and system of rhizomes, and producing a basal rosette of leaves. Each leaf is up to 7 centimeters long with a toothed or smooth-edged blade borne on a short petiole. The inflorescence arises on a stout, hairy peduncle up to 35 centimeters tall. White-petaled flowers occur in a cluster or dense array at the top.
