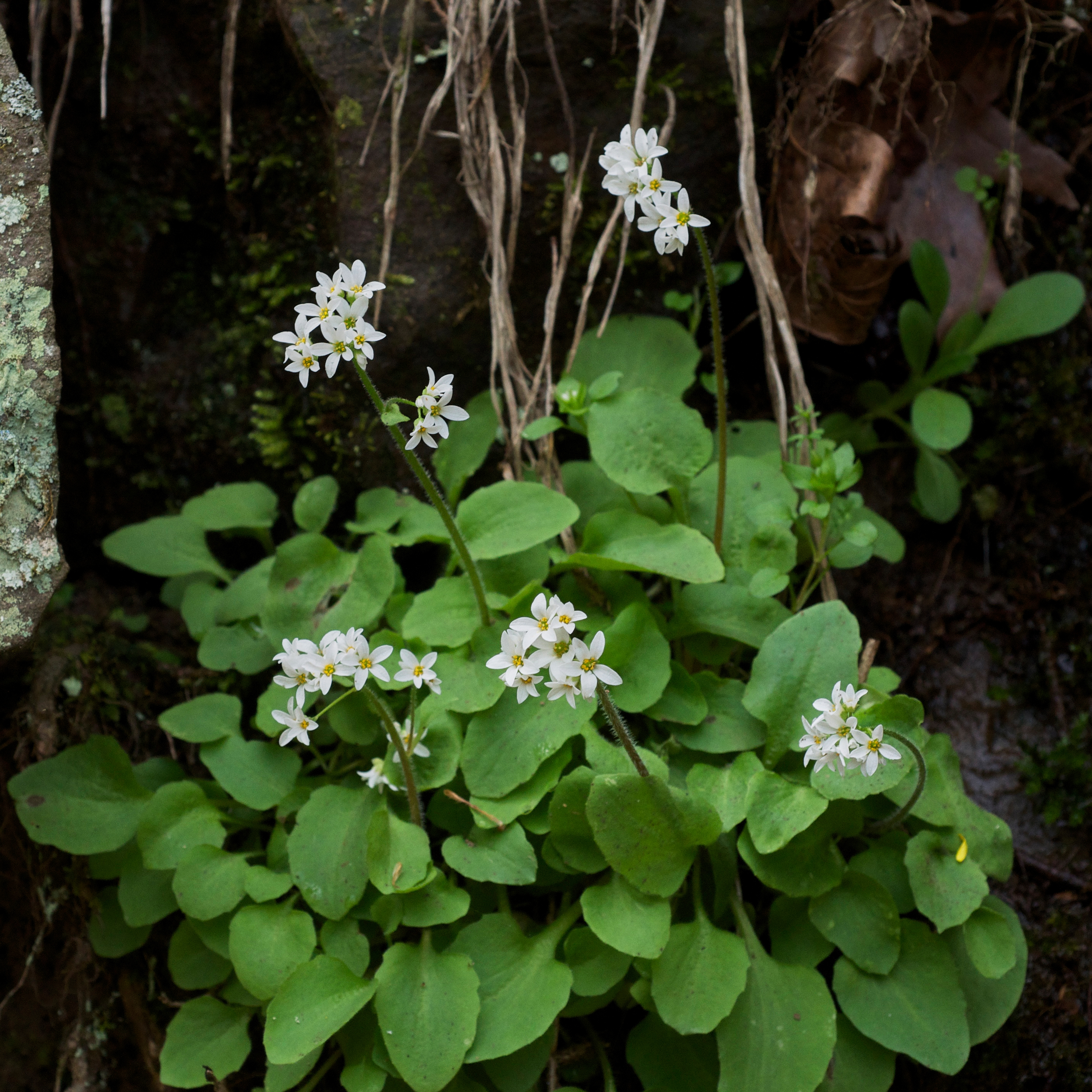

Scientific classification
- Kingdom: Plantae
- Clade: Embryophytes
- Clade: Tracheophytes
- Clade: Spermatophytes
- Clade: Angiosperms
- Clade: Eudicots
- Order: Saxifragales
- Family: Saxifragaceae
- Genus: Micranthes
- Species: M. palmeri

Binomial name
- Micranthes palmeri Bush

= Micranthes palmeri =

Species of flowering plant

Micranthes palmeri, commonly called Palmer's saxifrage, is a species of plant in the saxifrage family that is native to Oklahoma and Arkansas in the United States.
