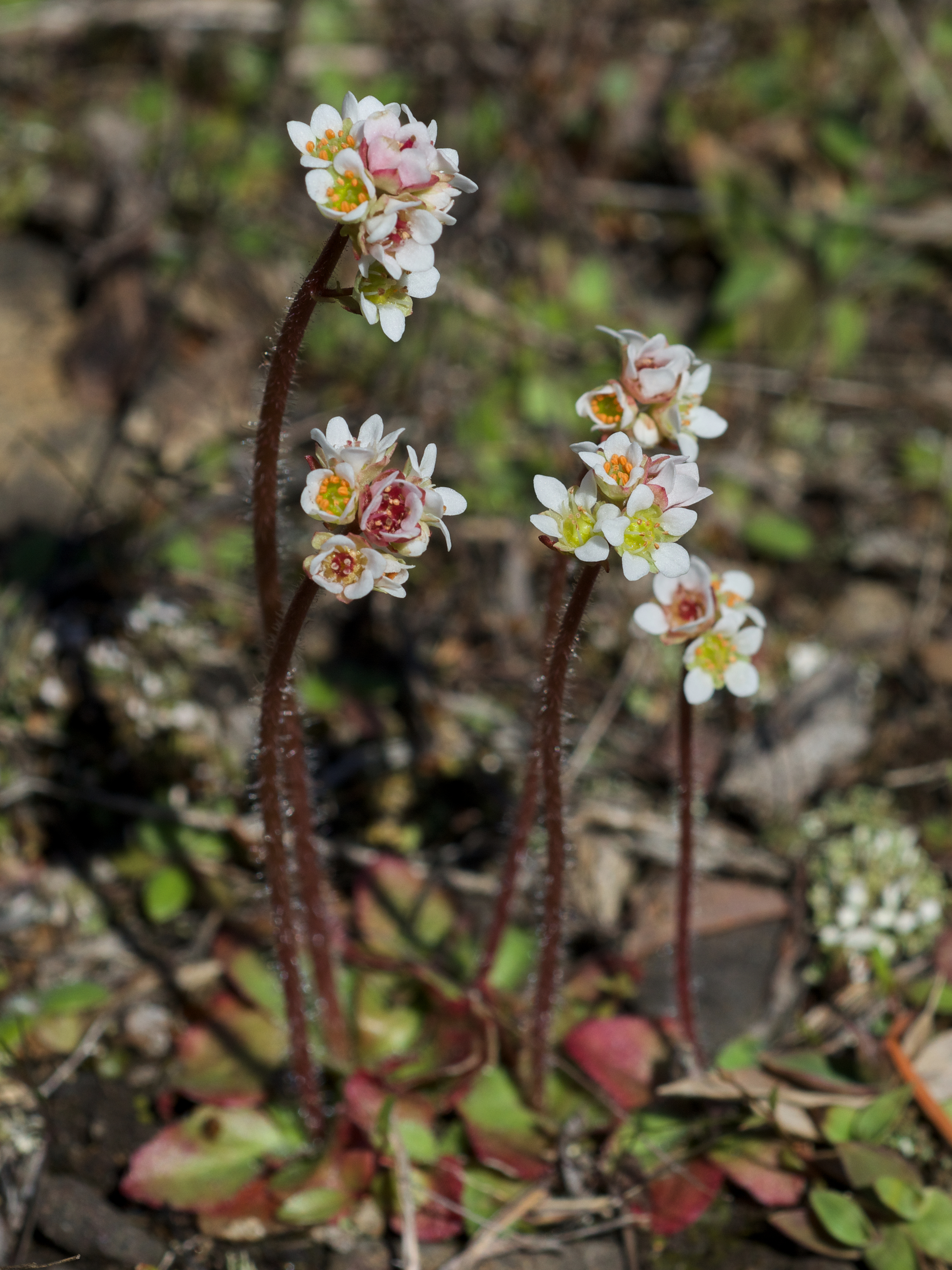

Scientific classification
- Kingdom: Plantae
- Clade: Embryophytes
- Clade: Tracheophytes
- Clade: Spermatophytes
- Clade: Angiosperms
- Clade: Eudicots
- Order: Saxifragales
- Family: Saxifragaceae
- Genus: Micranthes
- Species: M. texana

Binomial name
- Micranthes texana (Buckley) Small

= Micranthes texana =

Species of flowering plant

Micranthes texana, commonly called Texas saxifrage, is a species of plant in the saxifrage family that is native to Texas, Oklahoma, Arkansas, Missouri, Louisiana and Nebraska with a disjunct occurrence in Georgia.
