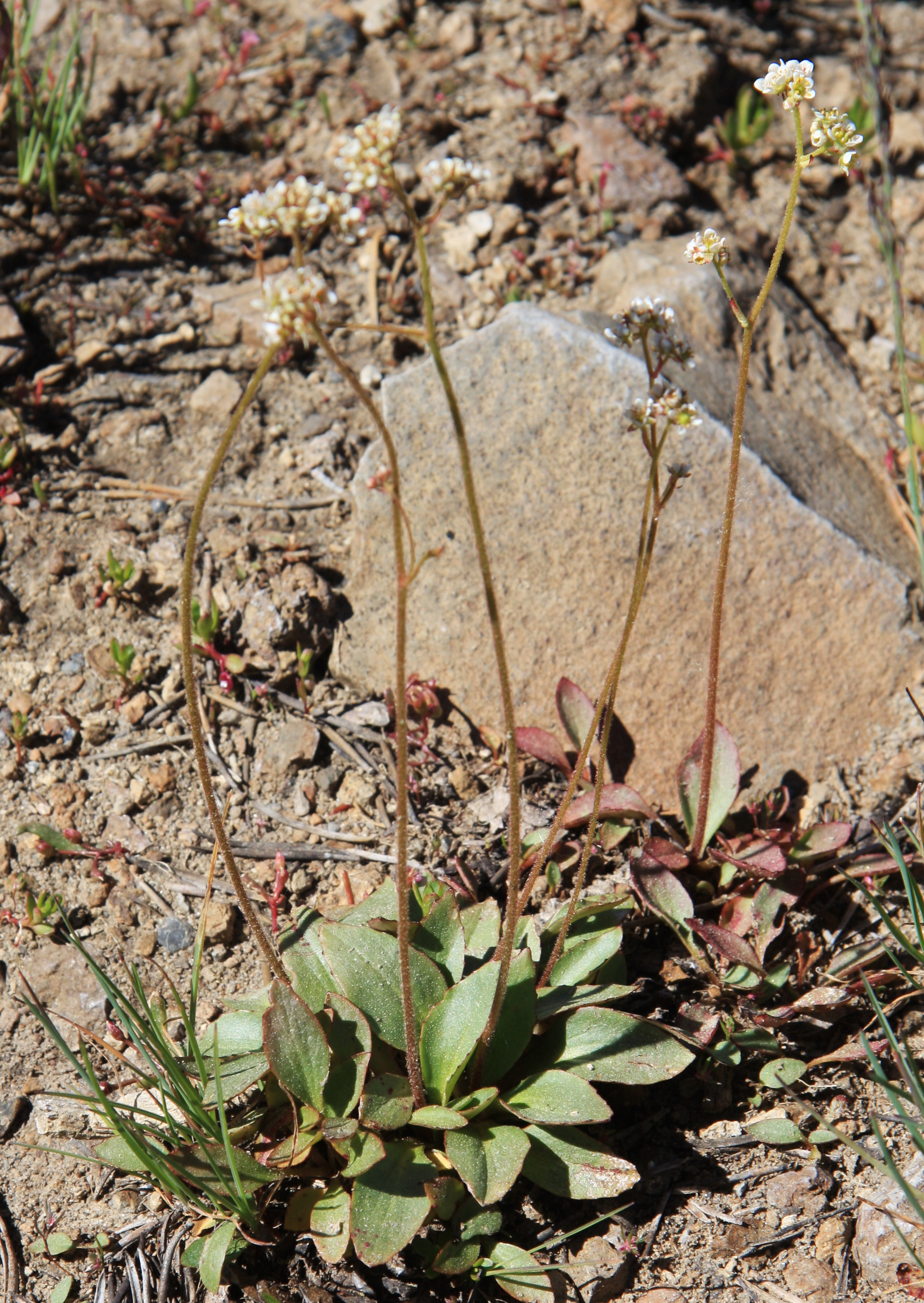

Scientific classification
- Kingdom: Plantae
- Clade: Tracheophytes
- Clade: Angiosperms
- Clade: Eudicots
- Order: Saxifragales
- Family: Saxifragaceae
- Genus: Micranthes
- Species: M. aprica

Binomial name
- Micranthes aprica (Greene) Small

= Micranthes aprica =

Species of flowering plant

Micranthes aprica is a species of flowering plant known by the common name Sierra saxifrage. It is native to the high mountains of California, including the Sierra Nevada and the southern Cascade Range, and adjacent slopes in southern Oregon and western Nevada. It grows in mountain habitat in areas of alpine climate, such as meadows and next to streams of snowmelt. It is a perennial herb which spends most of the year in a dormant state in order to save water, and rarely flowers. It produces a small gray-green basal rosette of toothed oval leaves up to about 4 centimeters long. When it does bloom, it sends up an erect inflorescence on a peduncle several centimeters tall topped with a cluster of flowers. Each flower has five sepals, five small white petals, and a clump of whiskery stamens at the center.

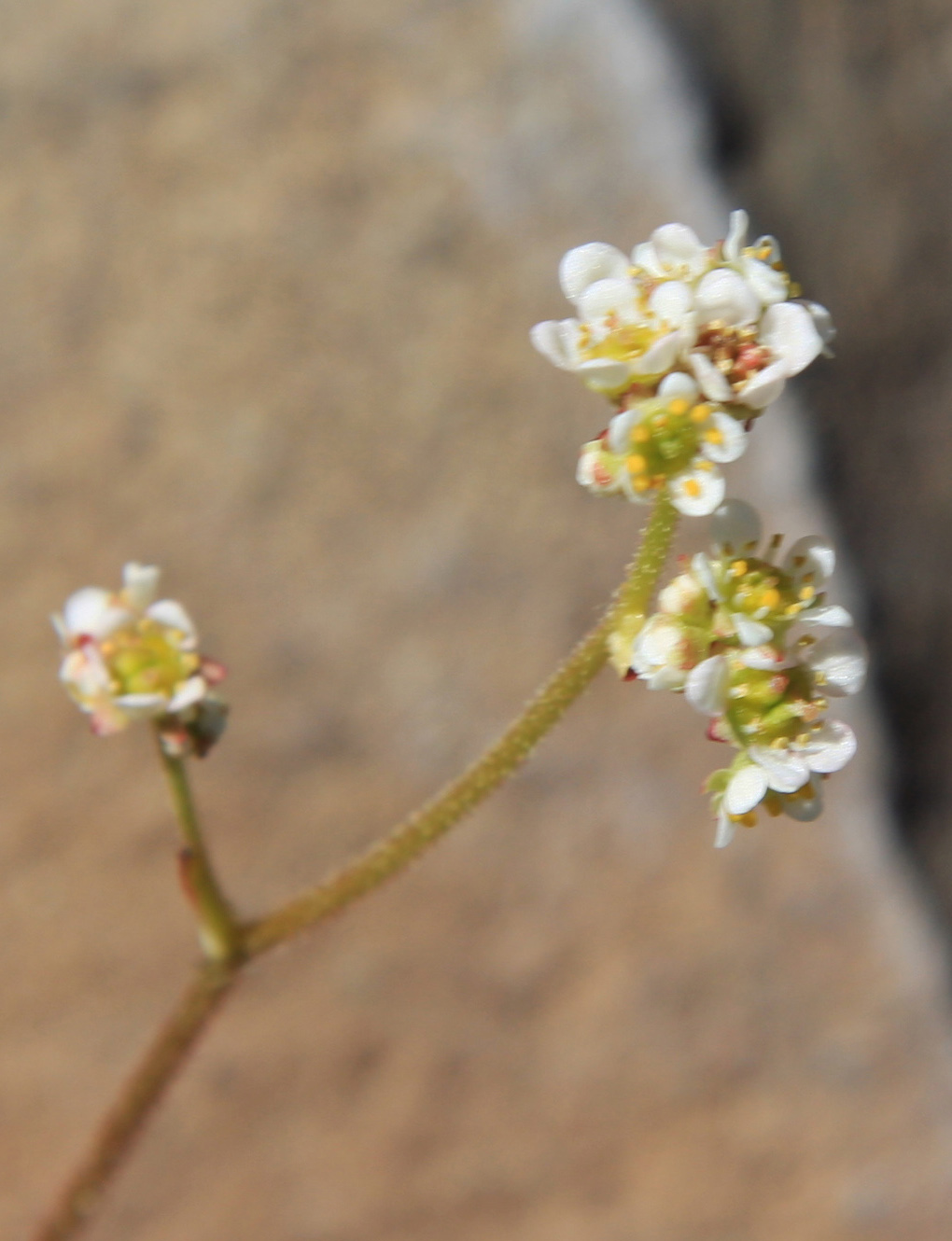
Sierra saxifrage, flowers
