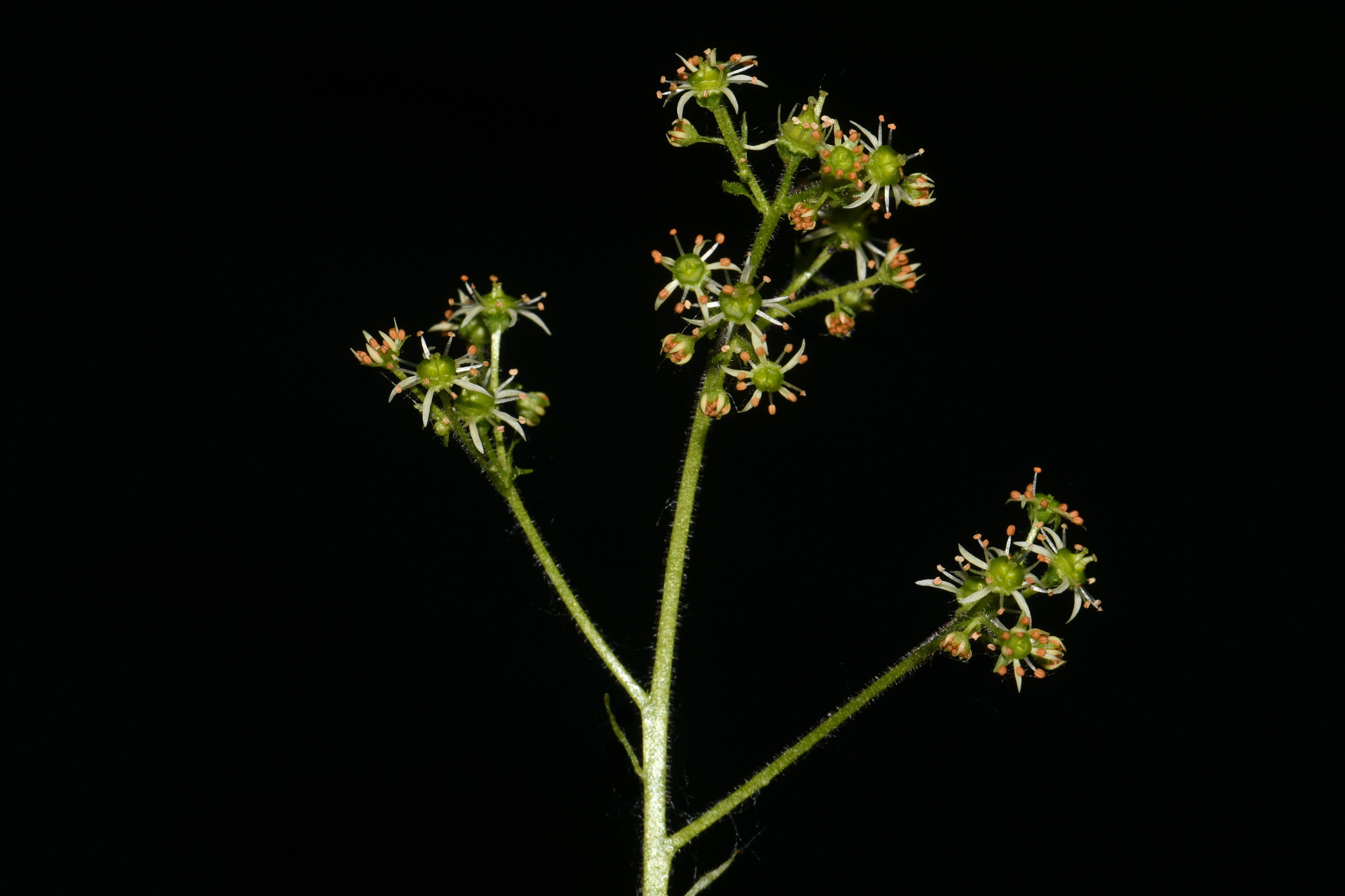

Scientific classification
- Kingdom: Plantae
- Clade: Tracheophytes
- Clade: Angiosperms
- Clade: Eudicots
- Order: Saxifragales
- Family: Saxifragaceae
- Genus: Micranthes
- Species: M. pensylvanica

Binomial name
- Micranthes pensylvanica (L.) Haw.

= Micranthes pensylvanica =

Species of flowering plant

Micranthes pensylvanica, the swamp saxifrage, is a species of flowering plant in the family Saxifragaceae. It is native to swampy areas in eastern North America, and it is found in Minnesota, Iowa, and Missouri eastward to the East Coast.

== Description ==
Micranthes pensylvanica forms small clusters of yellow petals and orange stamens around a green ovary. Flowers bloom in early summer, between May and June. The plant grows to a height of 12-40 inches.

== Distribution ==
Micranthes pensylvanica is not considered endangered, though it is rare in several of its native states, such as Indiana.
