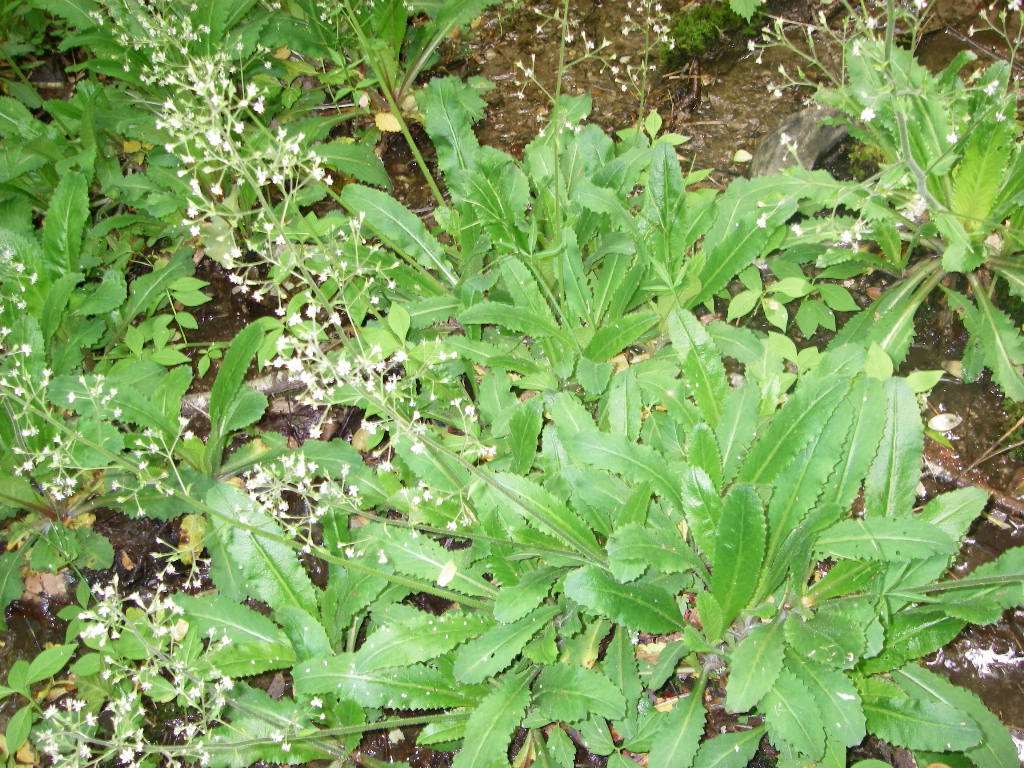

Conservation status
- Secure (NatureServe)

Scientific classification
- Kingdom: Plantae
- Clade: Tracheophytes
- Clade: Angiosperms
- Clade: Eudicots
- Order: Saxifragales
- Family: Saxifragaceae
- Genus: Micranthes
- Species: M. micranthidifolia

Binomial name
- Micranthes micranthidifolia (Haw.) Small

Synonyms
- Saxifraga micranthidifolia (Haw.) Steud.

= Micranthes micranthidifolia =

Species of flowering plant

Micranthes micranthidifolia is a member of the Saxifrage family with the common names lettuceleaf saxifrage, branch lettuce, brook lettuce and bear's lettuce. It grows in wet areas and mountain streams.

It is a native plant of the Great Smoky Mountains and occurs in many other parts of the southeastern United States.
