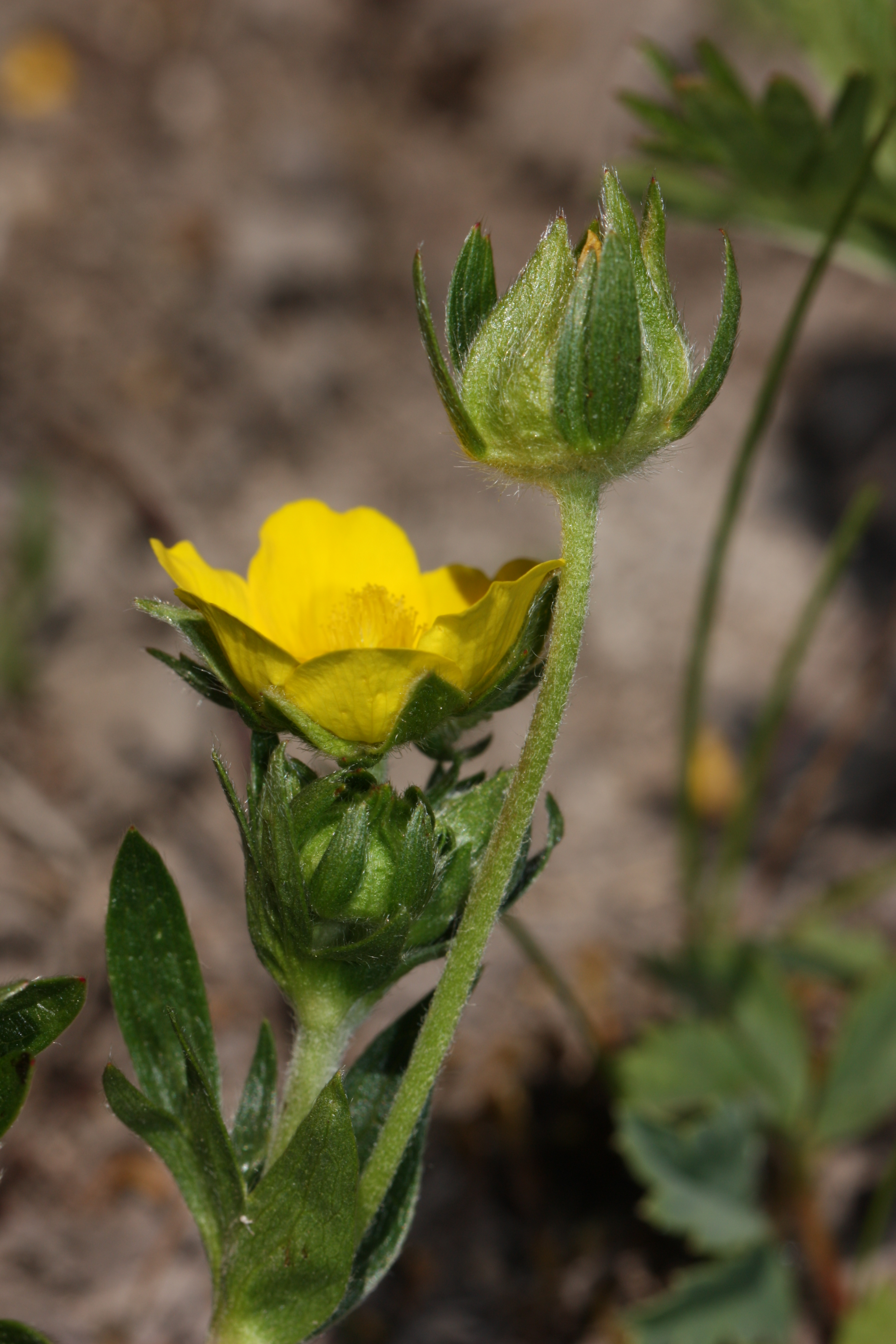

Conservation status
- Least Concern (IUCN 3.1)

Scientific classification
- Kingdom: Plantae
- Clade: Tracheophytes
- Clade: Angiosperms
- Clade: Eudicots
- Clade: Rosids
- Order: Rosales
- Family: Rosaceae
- Genus: Potentilla
- Species: P. drummondii

Binomial name
- Potentilla drummondii Lehm.

Synonyms
- Potentilla dissecta var. drummondii (Lehm.) Kurtz; Potentilla anomalifolia M.Peck; Potentilla cascadensis Rydb.; Potentilla drummondii var. cascadensis (Rydb.) Th.Wolf; Potentilla drummondii var. genuina Th.Wolf; Potentilla drummondii subsp. typica D.D.Keck

= Potentilla drummondii =

Species of flowering plant

Potentilla drummondii is a species of flowering plant, known by the common name Drummond's cinquefoil, in the family Rosaceae. It is native to North America from Alaska to California, where it grows in many types of moist habitat. It is perhaps better described as a species complex containing many intergrading subspecies that readily hybridize with other Potentilla species. The plant is variable, growing decumbent or erect, small and tufted or up to 60 centimeters tall, hairless to woolly. The leaves are divided into several leaflets, which may be cut into lobes or toothed. The inflorescence is a cyme of several flowers. Each has a small corolla of yellow petals, each petal one half to one centimeter in length.
