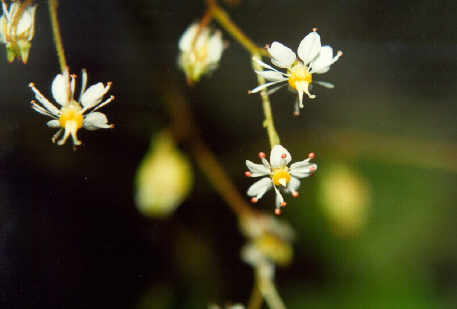

Scientific classification
- Kingdom: Plantae
- Clade: Embryophytes
- Clade: Tracheophytes
- Clade: Angiosperms
- Clade: Eudicots
- Order: Saxifragales
- Family: Saxifragaceae
- Genus: Micranthes
- Species: M. mertensiana

Binomial name
- Micranthes mertensiana (Bong.) Rosend.

Synonyms
- Heterisia eastwoodiae Small; Heterisia mertensiana Small; Saxifraga eastwoodiae (Small) Fedde; Saxifraga heterantha Hook.; Saxifraga mertensiana Bong.; Saxifraga mertensiana var. bulbillifera Engl. & Irmsch.; Saxifraga mertensiana var. eastwoodiae (Small) Engl. & Irmsch.; Saxifraga mertensiana f. eastwoodiae (Small) B.Boivin; Saxifraga mertensiana var. glandipilosa H.St.John & E.Hardin; Steiranisia heterantha (Hook.) Raf.

= Micranthes mertensiana =

Species of flowering plant

Micranthes mertensiana, the wood saxifrage or Mertens' saxifrage, is a species of flowering plant in the Saxifragaceae family. It is a subshrub native to western North America, which ranges from Alaska to Montana and California. It grows on mossy rocks and cliffs in subalpine areas. In California it grows in the Klamath Ranges, outer North Coast Ranges, and northern and central Sierra Nevada generally above 2,500 metres elevation.
