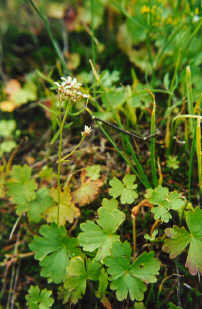

Scientific classification
- Kingdom: Plantae
- Clade: Tracheophytes
- Clade: Angiosperms
- Clade: Eudicots
- Order: Saxifragales
- Family: Saxifragaceae
- Genus: Hemieva; Raf. (1837), nom. rej.
- Species: H. ranunculifolia

Binomial name
- Hemieva ranunculifolia Raf. (1837)

Synonyms
- Boykinia ranunculifolia (Hook.) Greene (1891); Saxifraga ranunculifolia Hook. (1832); Suksdorfia ranunculifolia (Hook.) Engl. (1930)

= Hemieva =

Species of flowering plant

Hemieva ranunculifolia is a species of flowering plant in the saxifrage family known by the common name buttercup suksdorfia. It is the sole species in genus Hemieva. It is native to western North America from British Columbia and Alberta south to northern California. It grows in moist, rocky habitat in mountains and foothills. It is a non-rhizomatous perennial herb growing up to 40 centimeters tall. The leaves have rounded blades up to 4 centimeters wide with several large lobes edged with rounded teeth. The blades are light green, slightly fleshy, hairless in texture, and are borne on petioles up to 15 centimeters long. The inflorescence is a dense, flat-topped cluster of up to 35 flowers borne atop a mostly naked, hairy, glandular stalk. Each flower has a bell-shaped calyx of pointed sepals and five white or pink-tipped petals. The fruit is an oval brown capsule measuring 4 millimeters in length.
