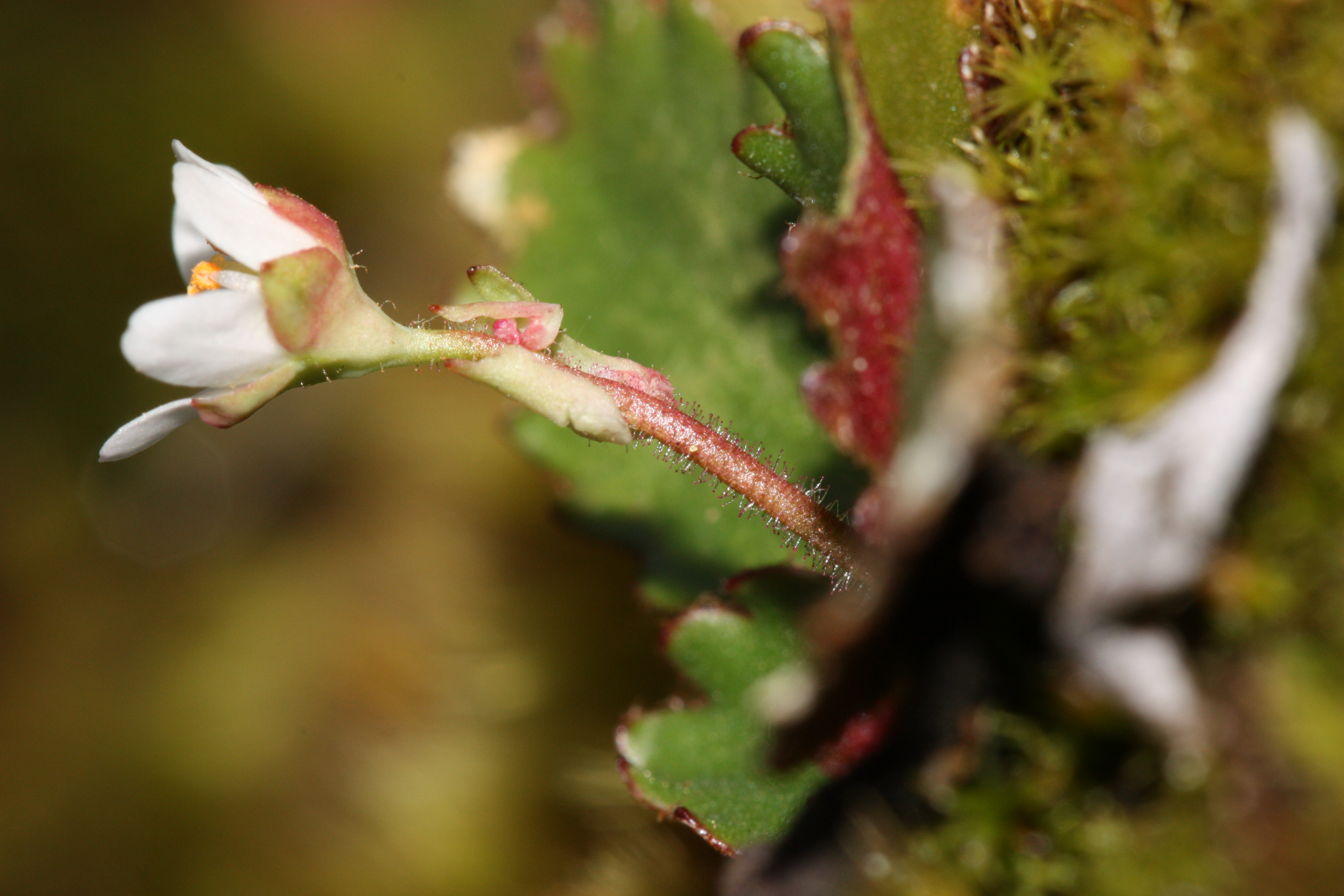

Scientific classification
- Kingdom: Plantae
- Clade: Tracheophytes
- Clade: Angiosperms
- Clade: Eudicots
- Order: Saxifragales
- Family: Saxifragaceae
- Genus: Micranthes
- Species: M. rufidula

Binomial name
- Micranthes rufidula Small

Synonyms
- Saxifraga rufidula (Small) Fedde

= Micranthes rufidula =

Species of flowering plant

Micranthes rufidula is a species of flowering plant known by the common name rustyhair saxifrage. It is native to western North America from British Columbia to Oregon, and one location in northern California. It grows in moist, open and rocky habitat in mountainous areas. It is a perennial herb growing from a small caudex and system of rhizomes. The leaves have oval blades lined with blunt teeth borne on long petioles. The inflorescence arises on a hairy peduncle, the flowers bearing white petals.
