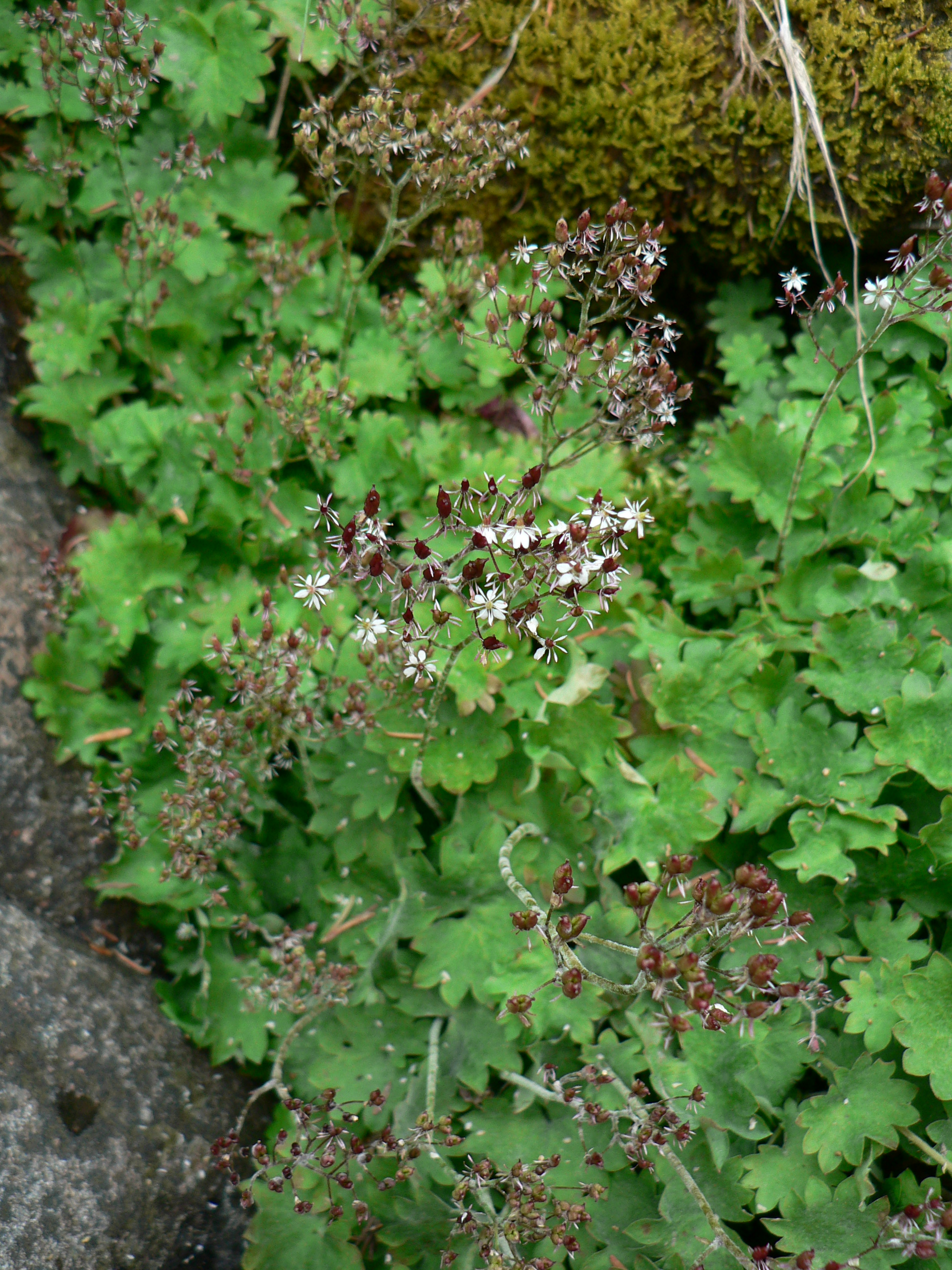

Scientific classification
- Kingdom: Plantae
- Clade: Tracheophytes
- Clade: Angiosperms
- Clade: Eudicots
- Order: Saxifragales
- Family: Saxifragaceae
- Genus: Micranthes
- Species: M. odontoloma

Binomial name
- Micranthes odontoloma (Piper) A. Heller

Synonyms
- Saxifraga odontoloma

= Micranthes odontoloma =

Species of flowering plant

Micranthes odontoloma is a species of flowering plant known by the common name brook saxifrage. It is native to much of western North America, where it can be found in many types of moist and rocky habitat types. It is a perennial herb. It produces a clump of leaves with rounded, toothed, or scalloped blades on long, thin petioles. The branching inflorescence arises on a slender, erect peduncle up to half a meter tall bearing many flowers. Each flower has five teardrop-shaped white petals with threadlike bases, and stamens with flat, narrow filaments that sometimes resemble additional petals.

The leaves are edible, and can be cooked to reduce their toughness.
