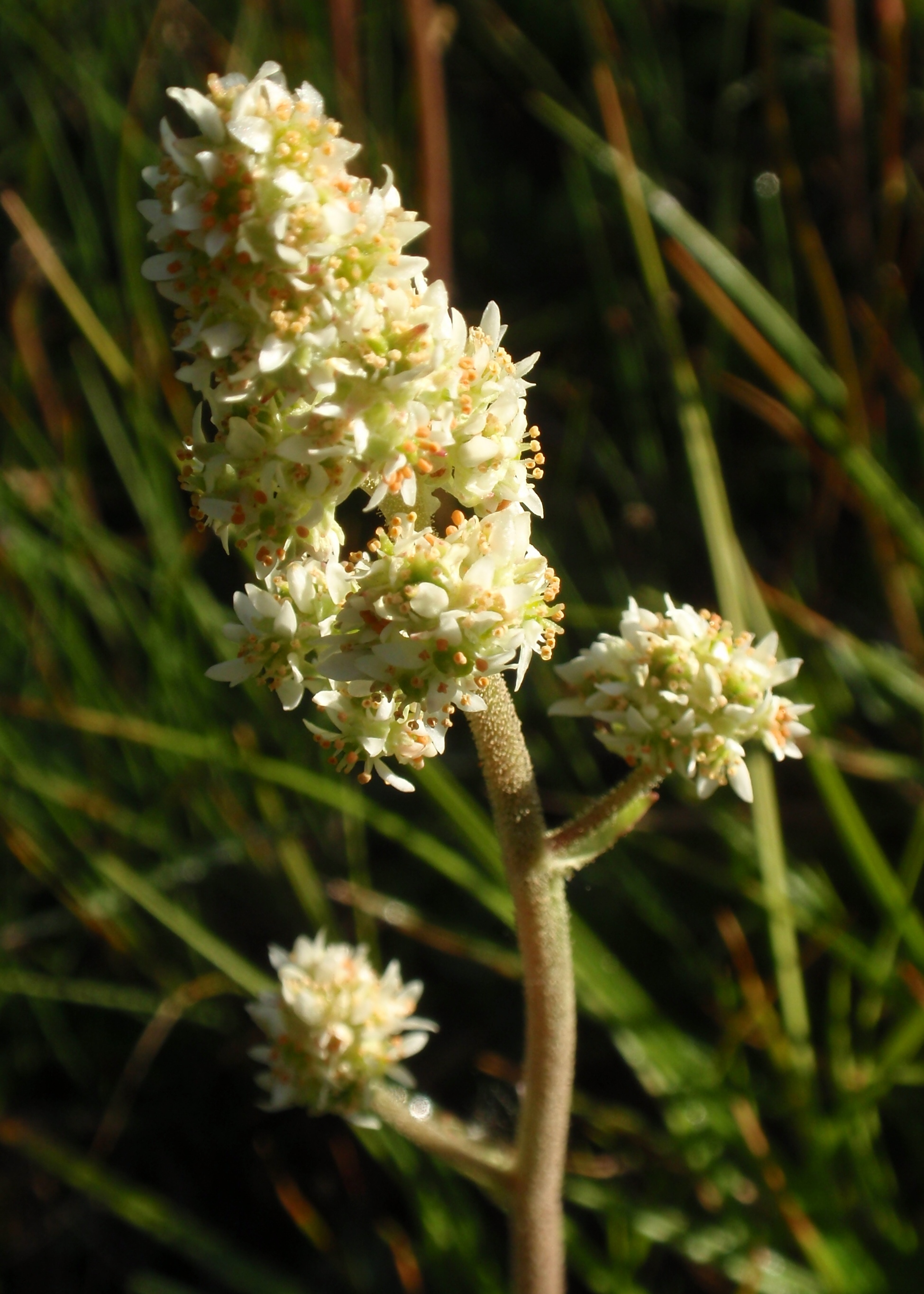

Scientific classification
- Kingdom: Plantae
- Clade: Tracheophytes
- Clade: Angiosperms
- Clade: Eudicots
- Order: Saxifragales
- Family: Saxifragaceae
- Genus: Micranthes
- Species: M. oregana

Binomial name
- Micranthes oregana (Howell) Small

Synonyms
- Saxifraga oregana

= Micranthes oregana =

Species of flowering plant

Micranthes oregana is a species of flowering plant known by the common name Oregon saxifrage. It is native to western North America, including the mountainous regions of the western United States. It can be found in moist habitat, such as marshes and other wetlands. It is a perennial herb growing from a thick, fleshy or woody caudex. It produces a basal rosette of linear to lance-shaped leaves each up to 25 centimeters long. The inflorescence arises on a stout peduncle which may exceed a meter in height. It is topped with one or more dense clusters of white-petaled flowers.
