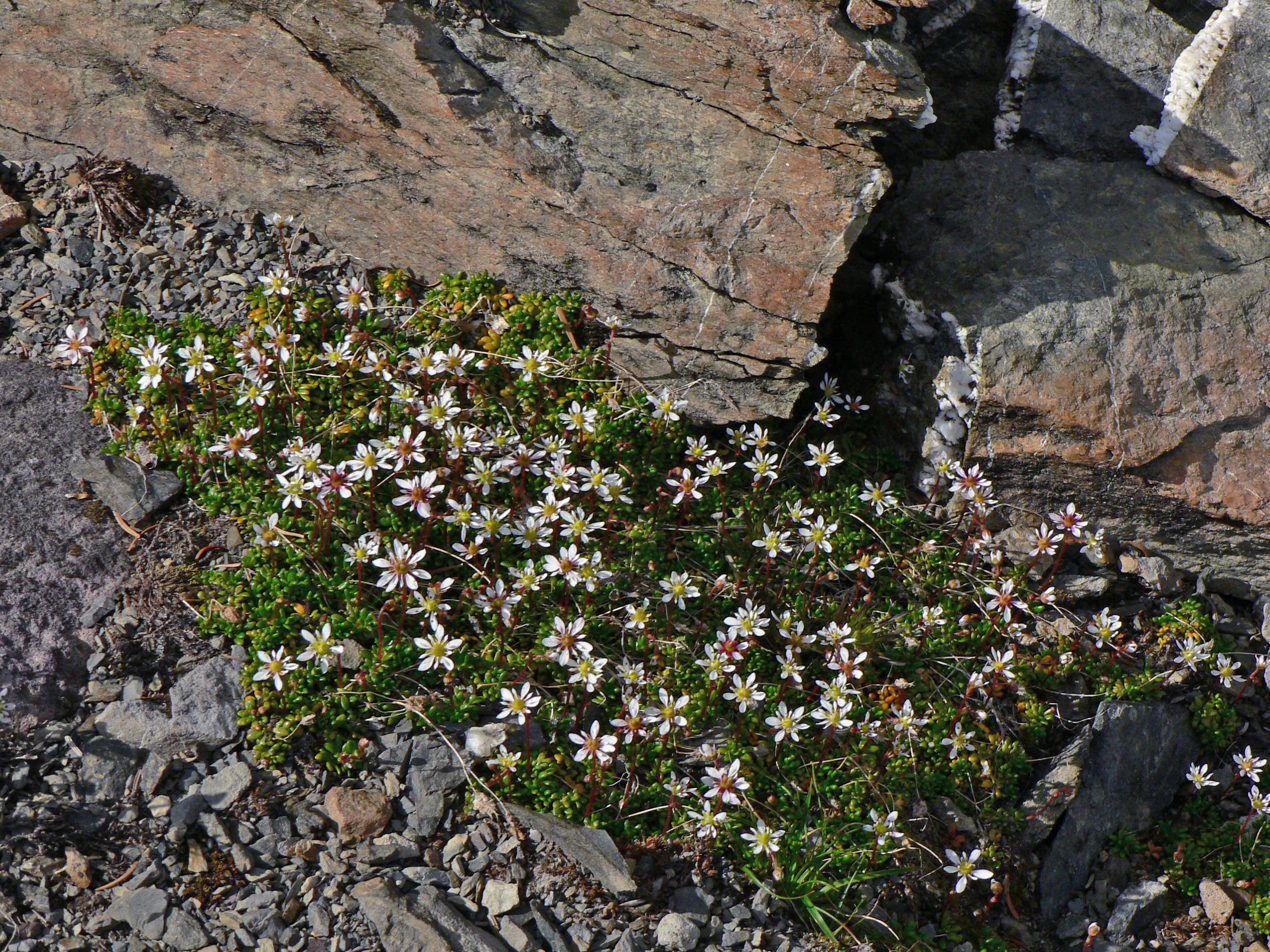

Scientific classification
- Kingdom: Plantae
- Clade: Tracheophytes
- Clade: Angiosperms
- Clade: Eudicots
- Order: Saxifragales
- Family: Saxifragaceae
- Genus: Micranthes
- Species: M. tolmiei

Binomial name
- Micranthes tolmiei (Torr. & A.Gray) Brouillet & Gornall

Synonyms
- Saxifraga tolmiei Torr. & A.Gray

= Micranthes tolmiei =

Species of flowering plant

Micranthes tolmiei is a species of flowering plant known by the common name Tolmie's saxifrage, or Tolmie's alpine saxifrage. It is native to western North America from Alaska to Montana to California, where it grows in rocky mountain habitat types, especially in alpine climates, such as talus and fellfields. It is a small perennial herb growing in mats of creeping stems lined with thick, fleshy leaves each up to 1.5 centimeters long. The inflorescence arises on a stout, erect peduncle with a few stubby bracts midway up. The flowers have narrow white petals and petal-like white stamens.

It was discovered by and named for Dr. William Fraser Tolmie. At the time, Dr. Tolmie was a 21-year old employee of the Hudson's Bay Company. He discovered M. tolmiei while climbing Mount Rainier in present-day Washington state.

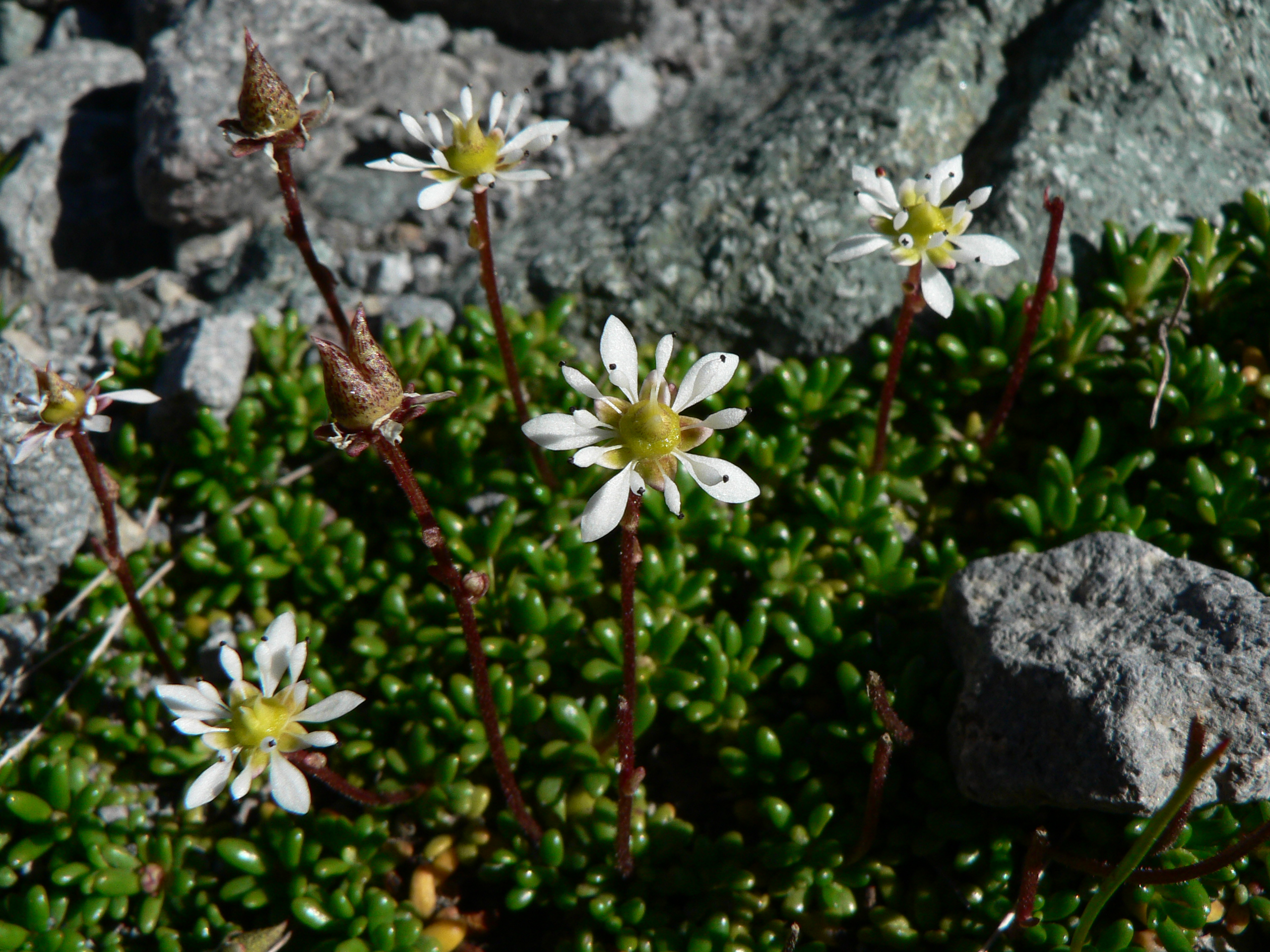
