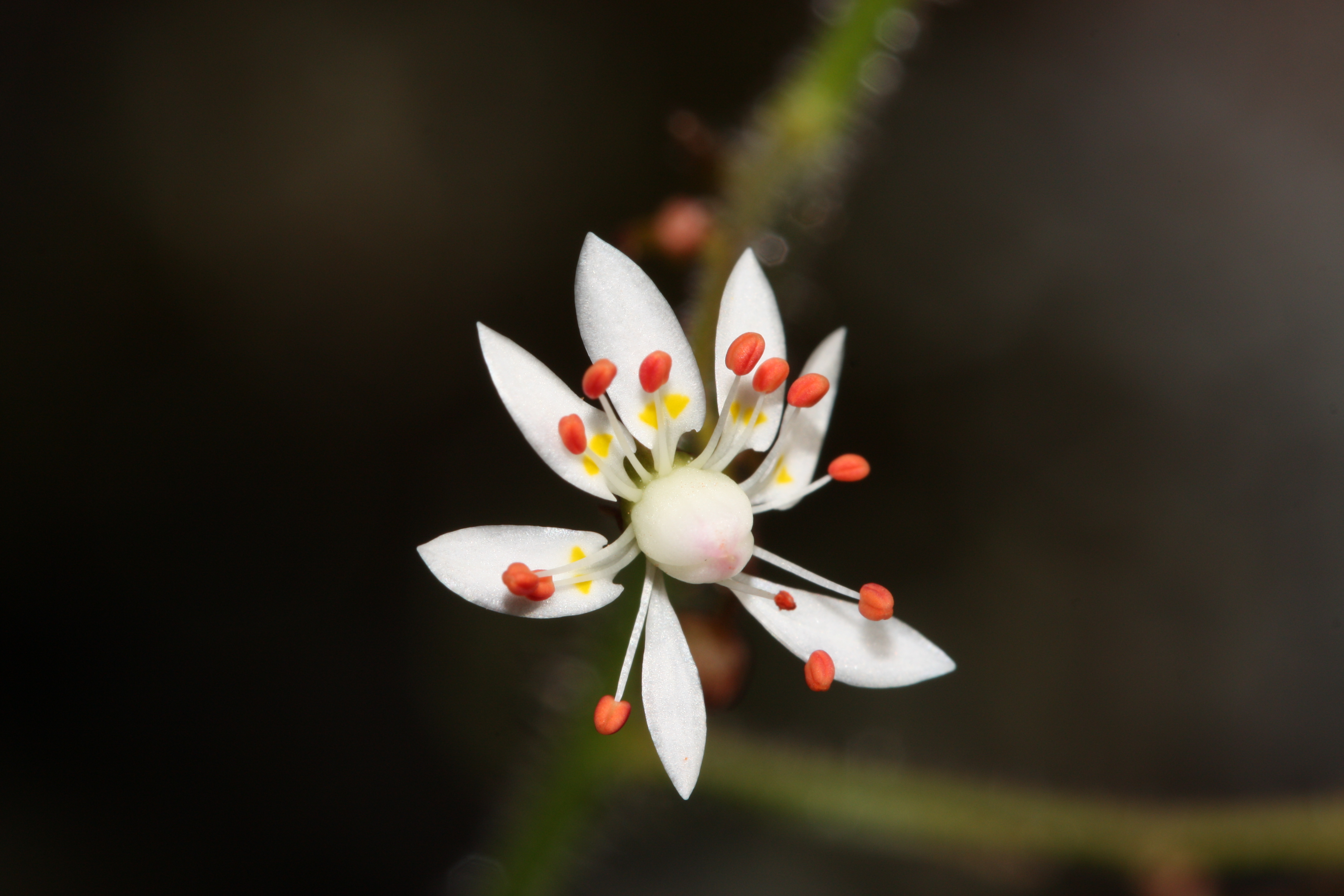

Scientific classification
- Kingdom: Plantae
- Clade: Tracheophytes
- Clade: Angiosperms
- Clade: Eudicots
- Order: Saxifragales
- Family: Saxifragaceae
- Genus: Micranthes
- Species: M. ferruginea

Binomial name
- Micranthes ferruginea (Graham) Brouillet & Gornall

= Micranthes ferruginea =

Species of flowering plant

Micranthes ferruginea is a species of flowering plant known by the common names russethair saxifrage and rusty saxifrage. It is native to western North America from Alaska and northwestern Canada to northern California to Wyoming, where it can be found in moist, rocky habitat in mountainous areas. It is a perennial herb growing from a caudex and rhizome system and producing a basal rosette of leaves. Each leaf is up to 6 centimeters long, thick and fleshy with large teeth along the edges. The inflorescence arises on a slender, hairy peduncle up to 40 centimeters tall. Thin branches bear flowers and reproductive bulbils. Each flower has spade-shaped white petals, the upper ones dotted with gold.
