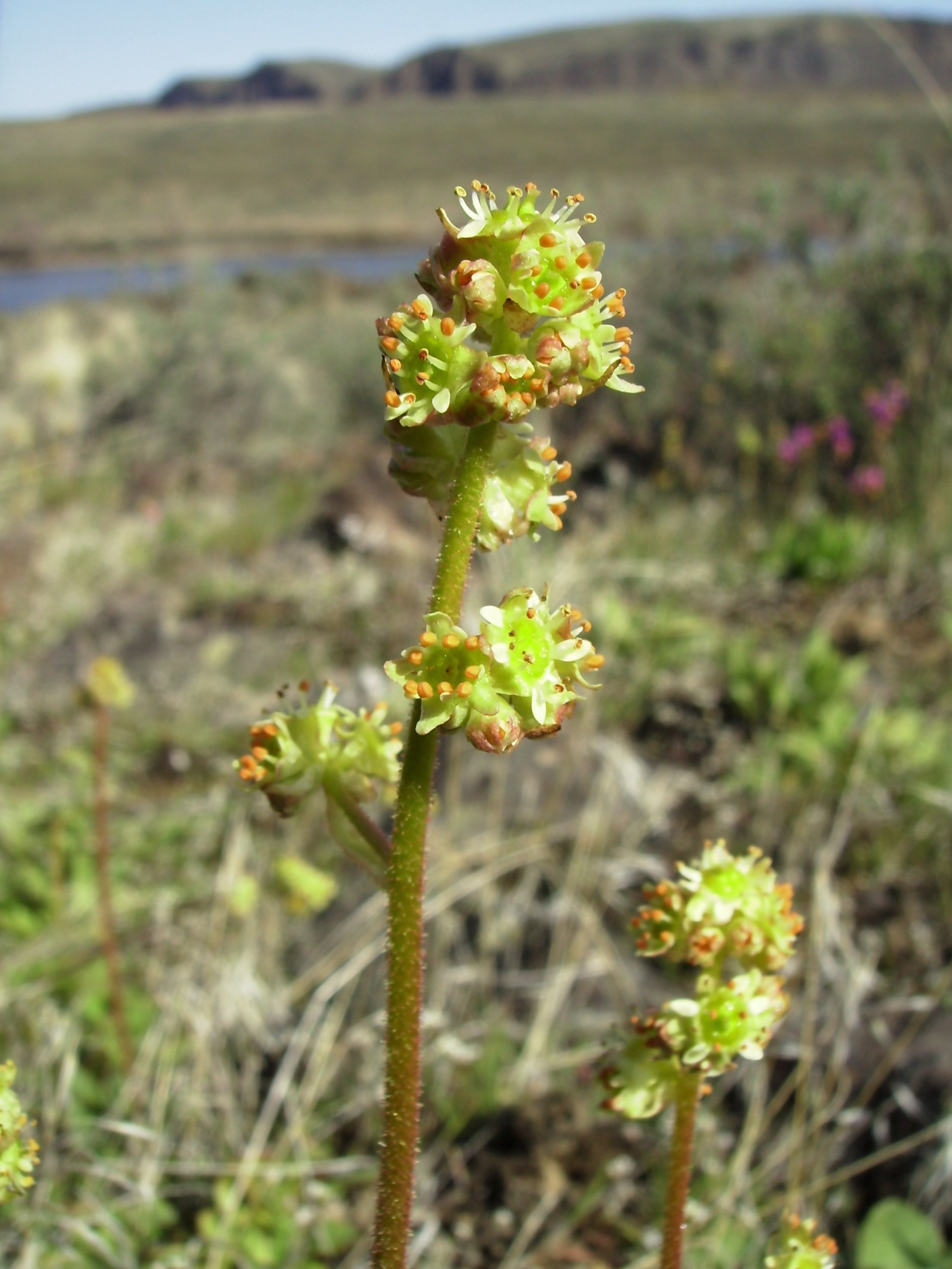

Scientific classification
- Kingdom: Plantae
- Clade: Tracheophytes
- Clade: Angiosperms
- Clade: Eudicots
- Order: Saxifragales
- Family: Saxifragaceae
- Genus: Micranthes
- Species: M. nidifica

Binomial name
- Micranthes nidifica (Greene) Small

= Micranthes nidifica =

Species of flowering plant

Micranthes nidifica, the peak saxifrage, is a species of plant in the saxifrage family. It is native to the northwestern United States, where it grows in moist habitat, often in mountainous areas. It is a perennial herb growing from a caudex and system of rhizomes and producing a basal rosette of leaves. Each leaf is up to 10 centimeters long with a smooth-edged or minutely toothed blade on a thin petiole. The inflorescence arises on a peduncle up to half a meter tall and bears clusters of flowers with white petals.
