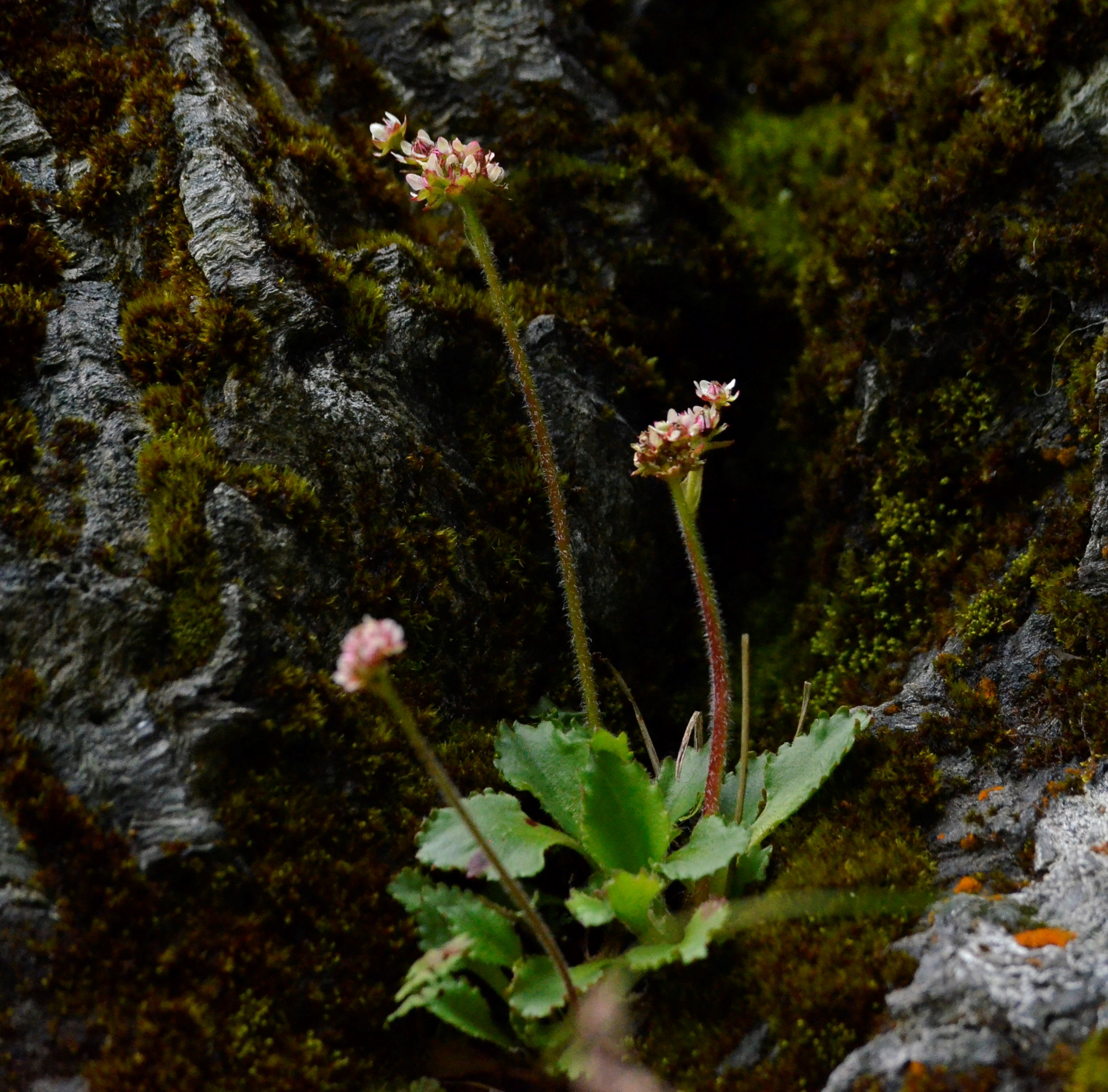

Scientific classification
- Kingdom: Plantae
- Clade: Tracheophytes
- Clade: Angiosperms
- Clade: Eudicots
- Order: Saxifragales
- Family: Saxifragaceae
- Genus: Micranthes
- Species: M. nivalis

Binomial name
- Micranthes nivalis (L.) Small

Synonyms
- Dermasea nivalis (L.) Haw.; Micranthes kumlienii Small; Micranthes nivalis (L.) Small; Robertsonia nivalis (L.) Link; Saxifraga kumlienii (Small) Fedde; Saxifraga nivalis f. longipetiolata Engl. & Irmsch.; Saxifraga obtusa Nasarow

= Micranthes nivalis =

Species of flowering plant

Micranthes nivalis is a plant species in the saxifrage family. It is commonly called snow saxifrage or (ambiguously) alpine saxifrage.

Micranthes nivalis is a perennial plant which grows on damp, shady, base-rich rocks and cliffs, usually in crevices and on ledges in locations where it cannot be crowded out by competing plants. In Britain the highest altitudes are recorded in Scotland, from 365 metres (1,198 ft) at the Quiraing, Isle of Skye, to 1,210 metres (3,970 ft) on Ben Lawers in Perth & Kinross. However it has been claimed as high as 1,300 metres (4,300 ft) in the Cairngorms. It grows to a height of 5–20 centimetres (2–8 in) with a leafless, hairy stalk. The flower is greenish white, turning reddish as it ages with five petals and five sepals. The leathery, greyish green, rhomboidal leaves make up a rosette at the base of the stem and lie close to the soil surface, and are only sparsely haired.

The Latin specific epithet nivalis means "as white as snow', or "growing near snow".

This species is also found in Norway, Ireland, Svalbard, northern Germany, Poland, Russia, Canada, Alaska and Greenland.

The plant was first described by Carl Linnaeus in Flora Lapponica (1737), as a result of his expedition to Lapland.

Some populations from the Canadian Province of Quebec have been recognized as a distinct species by some authors, but as a variety of M. nivalis by others:

- Saxifraga gaspensis Fernald
  - Saxifraga nivalis var. gaspensis (Fernald) B. Boivin
  - Micranthes gaspensis (Fernald) Small

is distinguished from var. nivalis by smaller inflorescences and narrower leaves. It is known only from the Shickshock Mountains of the Gaspé Peninsula of southeastern Quebec. It has been suggested that this may be a hybrid of M. nivalis and M. tenuis; further study is warranted.
