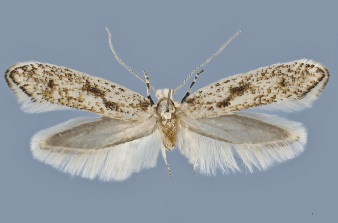
- Female
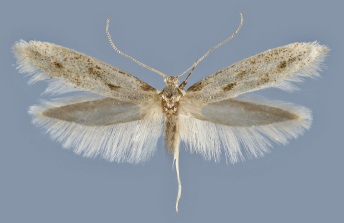
- Male

Scientific classification
- Kingdom: Animalia
- Phylum: Arthropoda
- Clade: Pancrustacea
- Class: Insecta
- Order: Lepidoptera
- Family: Yponomeutidae
- Genus: Kessleria
- Species: K. helvetica

Binomial name
- Kessleria helvetica Huemer & Tarmann, 1992

= Kessleria helvetica =

Species of moth

Kessleria helvetica is a moth of the family Yponomeutidae. It is found in Switzerland. The species is endemic to the Pennine Alps in the canton of Valais, where it inhabits rocky slopes at elevations between 1,850 and 2,300 metres. It was formally described as a distinct species in the early 1990s after being distinguished from the closely related Kessleria albescens. While its larvae remain undocumented, they are believed to mine the leaves of Saxifraga species growing among rock faces, similar to other moths in the albescens species group. Adults can be identified by their chalk-white forewings with light and dark brown markings and their distinctively long flight period from June to August.

== Taxonomy ==
Kessleria helvetica was formally described as a distinct species in the early 1990s during Peter Huemer and Gerhard Tarmann's revision of the Alpine Kessleria moths. Earlier authors had misapplied the name Hofmannia albescens (and later Kessleria albescens) to Swiss material; K. helvetica was erected to remove these records from K. albescens sensu stricto and from the closely related K. klimeschi and K. inexpectata. The specific epithet derives from the Latin adjective helveticus ("Swiss"), reflecting the species' confinement to Switzerland.

== Morphology ==
Adult forewings measure 6.9–7.0 mm in males and 6.2–7.3 mm in females. The ground colour is chalk-white, evenly dusted with light- and dark-brown scales that form three inconspicuous markings: a small irregular dark blotch one-third along the fold, a second spot farther out on the costa, and a faint grey-brown dot at the cell's end. The basal part of the fringe is whitish, the distal part blackish, producing a fine double line along the wing margin; hindwings are pale grey with whitish fringes. Females are slightly shorter-winged and show reduced dark scaling but otherwise match the males.

The male genital capsule is characterised by a powerfully developed saccus and an exceptionally long, slim aedeagus (1.52–1.64 mm) bearing two spear-shaped cornuti that are far longer than in related taxa. Female genitalia are less distinctive, with a tiny ring-shaped antrum, a 1.6 mm ductus bursae that becomes granular distally, and a slender, sack-like corpus bursae about 1.5 mm long lacking a signum. These features, together with the large average forewing length, reliably separate K. helvetica from its congeners.

== Habitat, distribution and ecology ==
The species is restricted to the central Pennine Alps of the canton of Valais, Switzerland. Verified specimens come from rocky slopes around Zermatt, the Trift valley and the lower Saastal, at elevations from roughly 1,850 m up to 2,300 m. Like other members of the albescens species group, it favours steep, sparsely vegetated limestone or gneiss outcrops that provide deep crevices and ledges. The albescens group includes K. klimeschi, K. helvetica, K. inexpectata, K. orobiae, and K. albescens.

The larvae of Kessleria helvetica remain unknown, yet, by analogy with allied species, they are almost certainly leaf-miners on one or more broad-leaved Saxifraga species that grow among the rock faces. Adults have been taken on the wing from early June to the end of August, chiefly resting on sun-warmed stone. This unusually long flight period at high altitude suggests the possibility of a partial second generation in warm summers.
