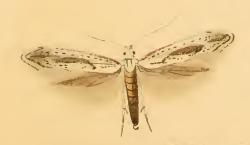

Scientific classification
- Kingdom: Animalia
- Phylum: Arthropoda
- Clade: Pancrustacea
- Class: Insecta
- Order: Lepidoptera
- Family: Yponomeutidae
- Genus: Kessleria
- Species: K. saxifragae

Binomial name
- Kessleria saxifragae (Stainton, 1868)

Synonyms
- Zelleria saxifragae Stainton, 1868

= Kessleria saxifragae =

Species of moth

Kessleria saxifragae is a moth of the family Yponomeutidae. It is widespread in Europe (including Ireland, Scotland, Austria, Bosnia and Herzegovina, the French mainland, Germany, the Italian mainland, Macedonia, Poland, Slovakia, the Spanish mainland, Switzerland, Romania and former Yugoslavia) and is also recorded from the Levant.

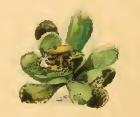
A shoot of Saxifraga aizoon with larval web

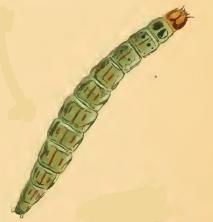
Larva

The length of the forewings is 7.2–8.6 mm for males and 6.5–7.4 mm for females. The head is white, sometimes mixed with light fuscous. Forewings are white, sprinkled with pale brownish; four longitudinal series of black dots, uppermost only on anterior half; a curved oblique dark brown streak extending from 1/3 of dorsum to middle of disc; an indistinct often interrupted longitudinal brownish suffusion from extremity of this to apex of wing; a black subbasal line in cilia round apex, reaching tornus. Hindwings are grey, paler anteriorly. The larva is greenish; dorsal line reddish; subdorsal dark reddish, interrupted; head yellow brown.

Adults are on wing from the beginning of June to the end of August.

Larvae have been recorded on Saxifraga oppositifolia, Saxifraga paniculata, Saxifraga grisebachii, Saxifraga aizoides, Saxifraga hirsute and Saxifraga spathularis.
