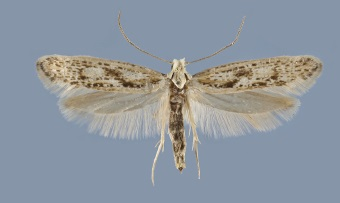
- Female
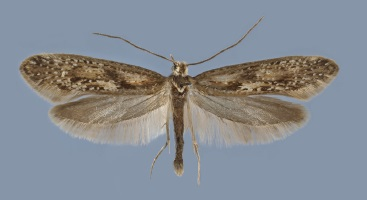
- Male

Scientific classification
- Kingdom: Animalia
- Phylum: Arthropoda
- Class: Insecta
- Order: Lepidoptera
- Family: Yponomeutidae
- Genus: Kessleria
- Species: K. alternans

Binomial name
- Kessleria alternans (Staudinger, 1871)

Synonyms
- Swammerdamia alternans Staudinger, 1871

= Kessleria alternans =

Species of moth

Kessleria alternans is a moth of the family Yponomeutidae. It is found in France, Switzerland and Italy. It has also been recorded from the Caucasus.

The length of the forewings is 8–9.2 mm for males and 6.7-8.1 mm for females. Adults have been recorded from mid to the end of July.

The larvae feed on Saxifraga oppositifolia and Saxifraga paniculata.
