= Kessleria alpicella =

Scientific classification
- Kingdom: Animalia
- Phylum: Arthropoda
- Clade: Pancrustacea
- Class: Insecta
- Order: Lepidoptera
- Family: Yponomeutidae
- Genus: Kessleria
- Species: K. alpicella

Binomial name
- Kessleria alpicella (Stainton, 1851)

Synonyms
- Tinea alpicella Stainton, 1851; Swammerdamia alpicella

Species of moth

Kessleria alpicella is a moth of the family Yponomeutidae. It is found in Germany, Poland, the Czech Republic, Slovakia, Austria, Switzerland, Italy and most of the Balkan Peninsula.

The length of the forewings is 7–9 mm for males and 7.3-7.6 mm for females. Adults are on wing from the end of May to the end of July.

The larvae feed on Saxifraga paniculata and Saxifraga rotundifolia. They mine the leaves of their host plant. They can be found in November.
