= Kessleria burmanni =

Scientific classification
- Kingdom: Animalia
- Phylum: Arthropoda
- Clade: Pancrustacea
- Class: Insecta
- Order: Lepidoptera
- Family: Yponomeutidae
- Genus: Kessleria
- Species: K. burmanni

Binomial name
- Kessleria burmanni Huemer & Tarmann, 1992

Species of moth

Kessleria burmanni is a moth of the family Yponomeutidae. It is found in Switzerland, Austria and Slovenia.

The length of the forewings is 7–8.4 mm for males and 4.5–6.5 mm for females. Adults are on wing from the beginning of July to the end of August.

The larvae feed on Saxifraga caesia, Saxifraga oppositifolia and possibly Saxifraga hiflora macropetala.
