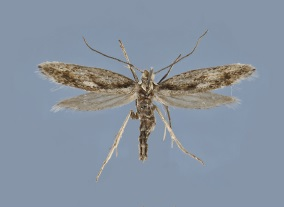
- Female
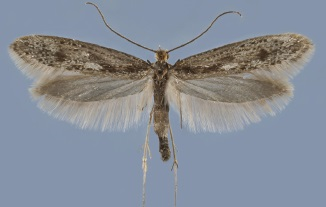
- Male

Scientific classification
- Kingdom: Animalia
- Phylum: Arthropoda
- Clade: Pancrustacea
- Class: Insecta
- Order: Lepidoptera
- Family: Yponomeutidae
- Genus: Kessleria
- Species: K. dimorpha

Binomial name
- Kessleria dimorpha Huemer & Mutanen, 2015

= Kessleria dimorpha =

Species of moth

Kessleria dimorpha is a moth species of the family Yponomeutidae. It is found only on the French side of Col Agnel (Cottian Alps), close to the Italian border. The habitat consists of rocky areas on siliceous soil

The length of the forewings is 8-8.4 mm for males and about 6 mm for females. The forewings of the males are dark grey, intensively mottled with light grey, ochre-brown and whitish scales and with a white medial patch in the fold. There are black dots, particularly on the costal and subcostal veins and there is a black patch near the base and at the end of the cell, as well as an oblique blackish fascia at about one-third to halfway, reduced to a large patch in the fold. The termen is mixed dark and light grey. The hindwings are dark grey. The ground colour of the forewings of the females is whitish, mottled with dark grey and black, particularly along the fold and in the tornal part. The hindwings are grey. Adults have been recorded on wing in early August.

The larvae are thought to feed on Saxifraga cf. oppositifolia.

== Etymology ==
The species name refers to the sexual dimorphism.
