= Glacier foreland =

Area between the leading edge of a glacier and the moraines of latest maximum

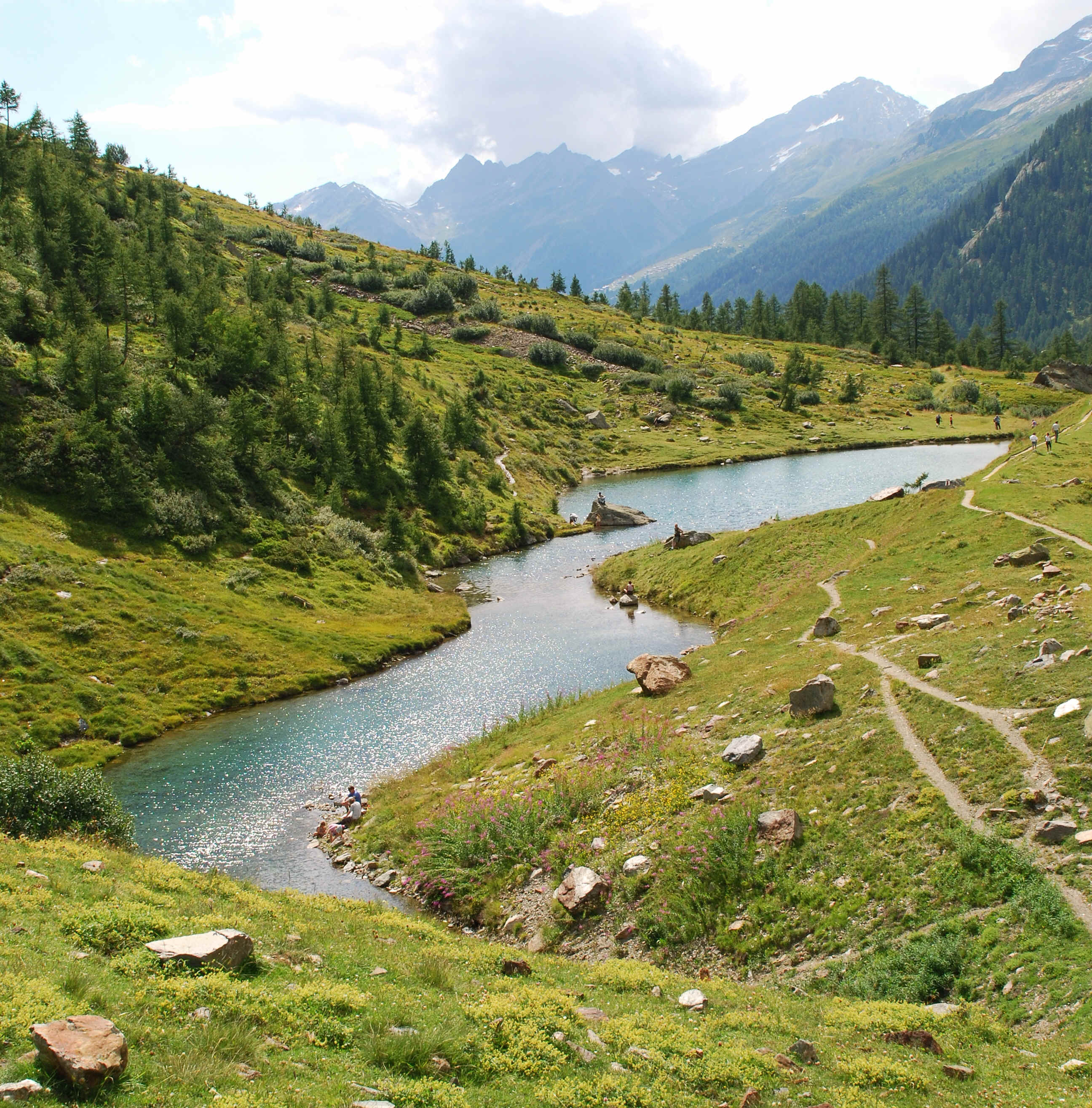
Glacier foreland beneath the Langgletscher in Switzerland

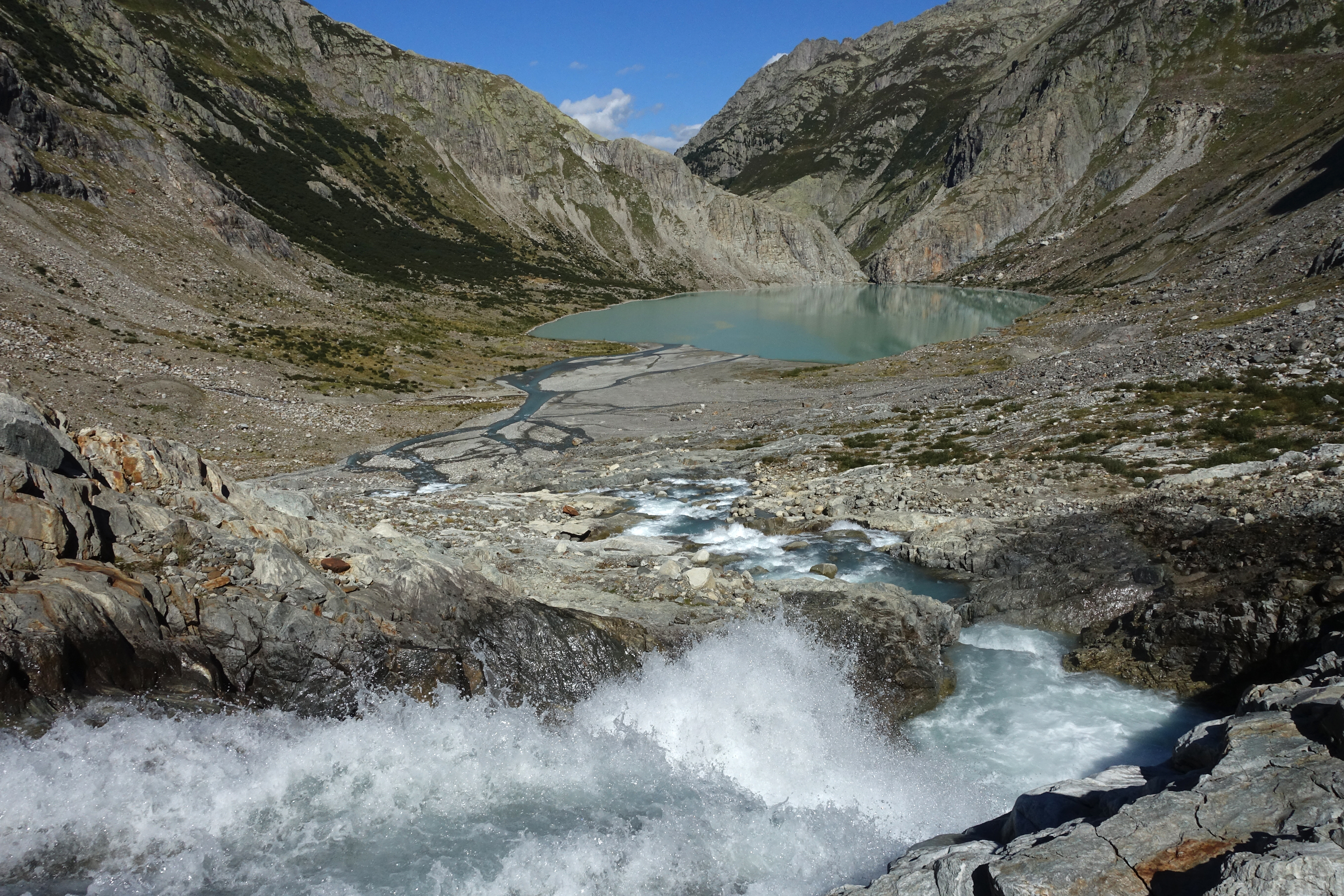
Glacier foreland Trift

The region between the current leading edge of the glacier and the moraines of latest maximum is called glacier foreland or glacier forefield. In the Alps this maximum was in 1850 and since then the region has become ice free due to deglaciation. Because of this relative recent development of vegetation and morphodynamic the glacier foreland differs considerably from the surrounding landscape.

== See also ==
- List of alluvial sites in Switzerland
- Trift Glacier Foreland in Switzerland
