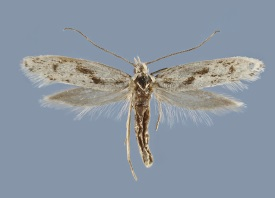
- Kessleria alpmaritimae

Scientific classification
- Kingdom: Animalia
- Phylum: Arthropoda
- Class: Insecta
- Order: Lepidoptera
- Family: Yponomeutidae
- Subfamily: Yponomeutinae
- Genus: Kessleria; Nowicki, 1864

Species
- See text

Synonyms
- Hofmannia Heinemann & Wocke, 1877; Paradoxus Stainton, 1869; Circostola Meyrick, 1889; Euhyponomeutoides Gaj, 1954 (disputed); Parahyponomeuta Toll, 1941 (disputed)

= Kessleria =

Genus of moths

Kessleria is a genus of moths of the family Yponomeutidae.

== Species ==
- Subgenus Kessleria
  - Kessleria alpicella-group
    - Kessleria alpicella - (Stainton, 1851)
    - Kessleria mixta - Huemer & Tarmann, 1992
  - Kessleria alternans-group
    - Kessleria alpmaritimae - Huemer & Mutanen, 2015
    - Kessleria alternans - (Staudinger, 1870)
    - Kessleria cottiensis - Huemer & Mutanen, 2015
    - Kessleria dimorpha - Huemer & Mutanen, 2015
    - Kessleria wehrlii - Huemer & Tarmann, 1992
  - Kessleria petrobiella-group
    - Kessleria nivescens - Burmann, 1980
    - Kessleria petrobiella - (Zeller, 1868)
  - Kessleria albanica-group
    - Kessleria albanica - Friese, 1960
    - Kessleria burmanni - Huemer & Tarmann, 1992
    - Kessleria hauderi - Huemer & Tarmann, 1992
    - Kessleria insubrica - Huemer & Tarmann, 1992
    - Kessleria macedonica - Huemer & Tarmann, 1992
  - Kessleria apenninica-group
    - Kessleria apenninica - Huemer & Mutanen, 2015
    - Kessleria brachypterella - Huemer & Tarmann, 1992
    - Kessleria brevicornuta - Huemer & Tarmann, 1992
    - Kessleria diabolica - Huemer & Tarmann, 1992
    - Kessleria pyrenaea - Friese, 1960
  - Kessleria zimmermanni-group
    - Kessleria albomaculata - Huemer & Tarmann, 1992
    - Kessleria caflischiella - (Frey, 1880)
    - Kessleria zimmermannii - Novicki, 1864
  - Kessleria albescens-group
    - Kessleria albescens - (Rebel, 1899)
    - Kessleria helvetica - Huemer & Tarmann, 1992
    - Kessleria inexpectata - Huemer & Tarmann, 1992
    - Kessleria klimeschi - Huemer & Tarmann, 1992
    - Kessleria orobiae - Huemer & Mutanen, 2015
- Subgenus Hofmannia Heinemann & Wocke, 1877
  - Kessleria fasciapennella - (Stainton, 1849)
  - Kessleria saxifragae - (Stainton, 1868)

== Unplaced ==
- Kessleria copidota - (Meyrick, 1889)
- Kessleria corusca - Meyrick, 1914
- Kessleria insulella - Moriuti, 1977
- Kessleria malgassaella - Viette, 1955
- Kessleria neuguineae - Moriuti, 1981
- Kessleria nivosa - (Meyrick, 1938)
- Kessleria parnassiae - (Braun, 1940)
- Kessleria pseudosericella - Moriuti, 1977

== Former species ==
- Kessleria longipenella - Friese, 1960
