= Kessleria zimmermanni =

Scientific classification
- Domain: Eukaryota
- Kingdom: Animalia
- Phylum: Arthropoda
- Class: Insecta
- Order: Lepidoptera
- Family: Yponomeutidae
- Genus: Kessleria
- Species: K. zimmermanni

Binomial name
- Kessleria zimmermanni Nowicki, 1864

Synonyms
- Kessleria tatrica Friese, 1960; Swammerdamia zimmermanni

Species of moth

Kessleria zimmermanni is a moth of the family Yponomeutidae. It is found in Poland and Slovakia.

The length of the forewings is 7-7.2 mm for males and 6.2 mm for females. Adults are on wing from June to the end of August.
