= Kessleria insubrica =

Scientific classification
- Kingdom: Animalia
- Phylum: Arthropoda
- Clade: Pancrustacea
- Class: Insecta
- Order: Lepidoptera
- Family: Yponomeutidae
- Genus: Kessleria
- Species: K. insubrica

Binomial name
- Kessleria insubrica Huemer & Tarmann, 1993

Species of moth

Kessleria insubrica is a moth of the family Yponomeutidae. It is found in Italy.

The length of the forewings is 7.5–8 mm for males and 6.5-7.4 mm for females. Adults are on wing from the beginning of June to the end of August.

The larvae feed on Saxifraga caesia.
