= Kessleria brachypterella =

Scientific classification
- Kingdom: Animalia
- Phylum: Arthropoda
- Clade: Pancrustacea
- Class: Insecta
- Order: Lepidoptera
- Family: Yponomeutidae
- Genus: Kessleria
- Species: K. brachypterella

Binomial name
- Kessleria brachypterella Huemer & Tarmann, 1992

Species of moth

Kessleria brachypterella is a moth of the family Yponomeutidae. It is found in France and Spain.

The length of the forewings is 7-7.3 mm for males and 5.6–6 mm for females. Adults have been recorded in August.
