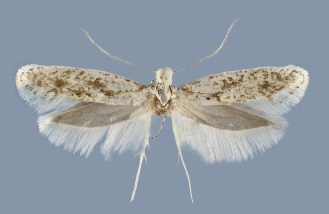
- Female
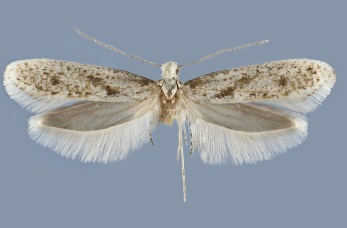
- Male

Scientific classification
- Kingdom: Animalia
- Phylum: Arthropoda
- Clade: Pancrustacea
- Class: Insecta
- Order: Lepidoptera
- Family: Yponomeutidae
- Genus: Kessleria
- Species: K. klimeschi

Binomial name
- Kessleria klimeschi Huemer & Tarmann, 1992

= Kessleria klimeschi =

Species of moth

Kessleria klimeschi is a moth of the family Yponomeutidae. It is found in Italy and Slovenia.

The length of the forewings is 6.4-7.7 mm for males and 5.5-6.5 mm for females. Adults are on wing from the end of June to the beginning of August.

The larvae feed on Saxifraga paniculata and Saxifraga incrustata. Young larvae mine the leaves of their host plant. When older, they live freely within a spinning.
