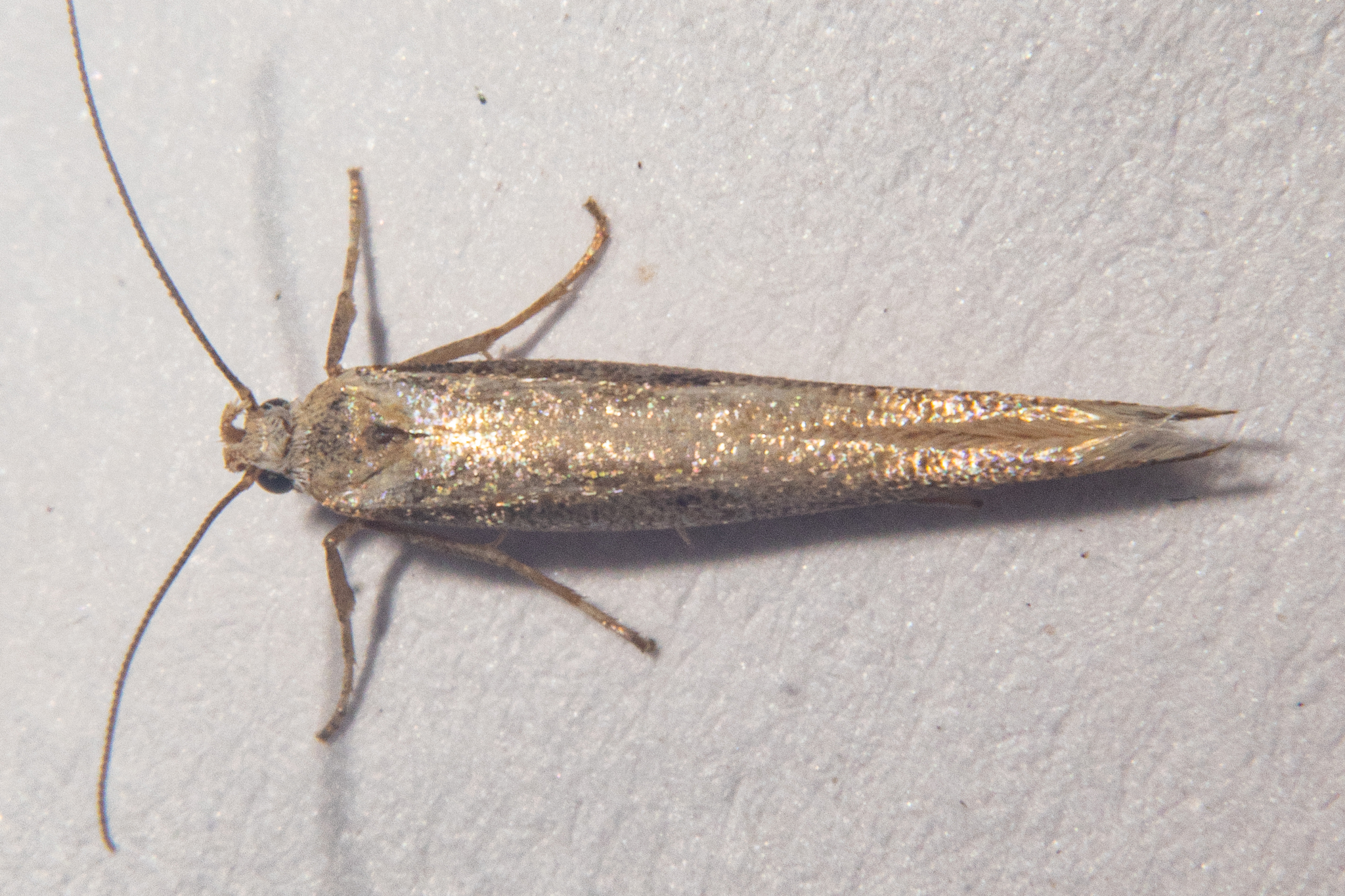

Scientific classification
- Kingdom: Animalia
- Phylum: Arthropoda
- Class: Insecta
- Order: Lepidoptera
- Family: Yponomeutidae
- Genus: Kessleria
- Species: K. copidota

Binomial name
- Kessleria copidota (Meyrick, 1889)

Synonyms
- Circostola copidota Meyrick, 1889; Zelleria copidota (Meyrick, 1889)

= Kessleria copidota =

Species of moth endemic to New Zealand

Kessleria copidota is a moth of the family Yponomeutidae. It is endemic to New Zealand.
