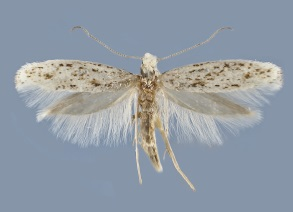
- Female
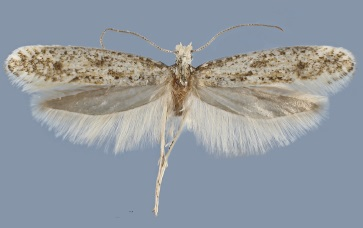
- Male

Scientific classification
- Kingdom: Animalia
- Phylum: Arthropoda
- Clade: Pancrustacea
- Class: Insecta
- Order: Lepidoptera
- Family: Yponomeutidae
- Genus: Kessleria
- Species: K. inexpectata

Binomial name
- Kessleria inexpectata Huemer & Tarmann, 1992

= Kessleria inexpectata =

Species of moth

Kessleria inexpectata is a moth of the family Yponomeutidae. It is found in France.

The length of the forewings is 6.5–7.5 mm for males and 5.5 mm for females. Adults are on wing in July.

The larvae feed on Saxifraga paniculata.
