= Kessleria fasciapennella =

Scientific classification
- Kingdom: Animalia
- Phylum: Arthropoda
- Clade: Pancrustacea
- Class: Insecta
- Order: Lepidoptera
- Family: Yponomeutidae
- Genus: Kessleria
- Species: K. fasciapennella

Binomial name
- Kessleria fasciapennella (Stainton, 1849)

Synonyms
- Zelleria fasciapennella Stainton, 1849; Kessleria longipenella Friese, 1960

Species of moth

Kessleria fasciapennella is a moth of the family Yponomeutidae. It is found in Great Britain, Fennoscandia, the Baltic region, Poland, Austria, Switzerland and Spain.

The wingspan is 14–18 mm. Adults are on wing from August to September and again, after overwintering, from May to June.

The larvae feed on Parnassia palustris. They mine the leaves of their host plant. They can be found from June to July.
