= Kessleria mixta =

Scientific classification
- Kingdom: Animalia
- Phylum: Arthropoda
- Clade: Pancrustacea
- Class: Insecta
- Order: Lepidoptera
- Family: Yponomeutidae
- Genus: Kessleria
- Species: K. mixta

Binomial name
- Kessleria mixta Huemer & Tarmann, 1992

Species of moth

Kessleria mixta is a moth of the family Yponomeutidae. It is found in Albania.

The length of the forewings is approximately 7 mm. Adults have been recorded in mid July.
