= Kessleria nivosa =

Scientific classification
- Kingdom: Animalia
- Phylum: Arthropoda
- Class: Insecta
- Order: Lepidoptera
- Family: Yponomeutidae
- Genus: Kessleria
- Species: K. nivosa

Binomial name
- Kessleria nivosa (Meyrick, 1938)

Synonyms
- Zelleria nivosa Meyrick, 1938

Species of moth

Kessleria nivosa is a moth of the family Yponomeutidae. It is found in China (Yunnan).
