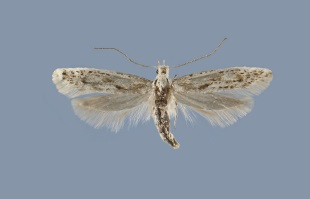
- Female
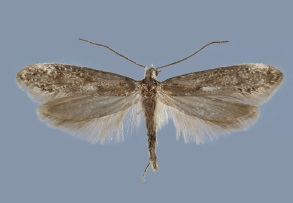
- Male

Scientific classification
- Kingdom: Animalia
- Phylum: Arthropoda
- Clade: Pancrustacea
- Class: Insecta
- Order: Lepidoptera
- Family: Yponomeutidae
- Genus: Kessleria
- Species: K. cottiensis

Binomial name
- Kessleria cottiensis Huemer & Mutanen, 2015

= Kessleria cottiensis =

Species of moth

Kessleria cottiensis is a moth of the family Yponomeutidae. The species was first described by Peter Huemer and Marko Mutanen in 2015. It is found only in a small area in the south-western Alps (the Cottian Alps) of Italy and France. The habitat consists of alpine grasslands interspersed with calcareous rocks.

The length of the forewings is 7–8.8 mm for males and 5.8–6.3 mm for females. The forewings of the males are dark grey brown, mottled with whitish scales, particularly in the distal half, forming indistinct patches in the fold and on the costa at about four-fifths and irregular black dots on the veins and a few brown scales in the medial part of the wing. There is an oblique blackish fascia at about one-third to halfway. It is indistinct dark grey brown, mottled with whitish scales, particularly in the distal half, forming indistinct patches in the fold and on the costa at about four-fifths. There are also irregular black dots on the veins and a few brown scales in the medial part of the wing. The ground colour of the forewings of the females is whitish, mottled with black scales. Adults have been recorded on wing in late July.

== Etymology ==
The specific name refers to the type locality in the Cottian Alps (Alpi Cozie, Alpes cottiennes).
