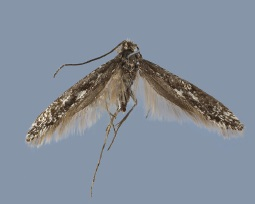
- Male

Scientific classification
- Domain: Eukaryota
- Kingdom: Animalia
- Phylum: Arthropoda
- Class: Insecta
- Order: Lepidoptera
- Family: Yponomeutidae
- Genus: Kessleria
- Species: K. pyrenaea

Binomial name
- Kessleria pyrenaea Friese, 1960

= Kessleria pyrenaea =

Species of moth

Kessleria pyrenaea is a moth of the family Yponomeutidae. It is found in France.

The length of the forewings is 7 mm for females. Adults have been recorded in mid July.
