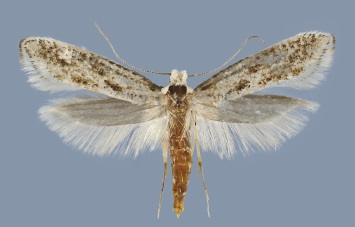
- Female
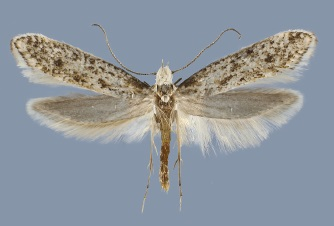
- Male

Scientific classification
- Kingdom: Animalia
- Phylum: Arthropoda
- Clade: Pancrustacea
- Class: Insecta
- Order: Lepidoptera
- Family: Yponomeutidae
- Genus: Kessleria
- Species: K. orobiae

Binomial name
- Kessleria orobiae Huemer & Mutanen, 2015

= Kessleria orobiae =

Species of moth

Kessleria orobiae is a moth of the family Yponomeutidae. It is found only in the Orobian Alps in the Bergamo Province in Italy. The habitat consists of rocky areas on calcareous and siliceous soil.

The length of the forewings is 6.7–7.3 mm for males and 5.9–6.6;mm for females. The forewings of the males are whitish-grey, intensively mottled with blackish-grey spots all over wing and a few ochre-brown scales in the dorsal part. There are blackish-grey patches at base of costa and at end of the cell and an oblique blackish-grey fascia at about one-third to halfway. The termen is whitish-grey. The hindwings are dark grey. The ground colour of the forewings of the females is whitish-grey, intensively mottled with blackish-grey spots all over the wing and with a few ochre-brown scales in the dorsal part. There are blackish-grey patches at the base of the costa and at the end of the cell and an oblique blackish-grey fascia at about one-third to halfway. The termen is whitish-grey. The hindwings are dark grey. Adults have been recorded on wing from late June to mid-August.

The larvae feed on a Saxifraga paniculata and other Saxifraga species. They live in the shoots and as a leaf miner in the basal leaves of their host plant. Mined leaves are partially spun together and covered with a fine silken web.

== Etymology ==
The species name refers to the Orobian Alps (Alpi Orobie) in northern Italy, where the type locality is situated.
