= Kessleria petrobiella =

Scientific classification
- Kingdom: Animalia
- Phylum: Arthropoda
- Clade: Pancrustacea
- Class: Insecta
- Order: Lepidoptera
- Family: Yponomeutidae
- Genus: Kessleria
- Species: K. petrobiella

Binomial name
- Kessleria petrobiella (Zeller, 1868)

Synonyms
- Scythropia petrobiella Zeller, 1868

Species of moth

Kessleria petrobiella is a moth of the family Yponomeutidae. It is found in Austria, Slovenia and Italy.

The length of the forewings is 6.3–8 mm for males and 6.4–7.8 mm for females. Adults are on wing from the end of May to the beginning of August.

The larvae feed on Saxifraga caesia.
