= Kessleria diabolica =

Scientific classification
- Kingdom: Animalia
- Phylum: Arthropoda
- Clade: Pancrustacea
- Class: Insecta
- Order: Lepidoptera
- Family: Yponomeutidae
- Genus: Kessleria
- Species: K. diabolica

Binomial name
- Kessleria diabolica Huemer & Tarmann, 1992

Species of moth

Kessleria diabolica is a moth of the family Yponomeutidae. It is found in central Spain.

The length of the forewings is 6.3 mm. Adults have been recorded in July.
