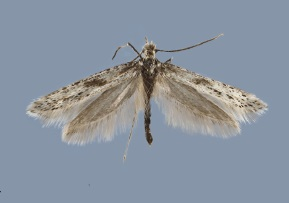
- Male

Scientific classification
- Kingdom: Animalia
- Phylum: Arthropoda
- Clade: Pancrustacea
- Class: Insecta
- Order: Lepidoptera
- Family: Yponomeutidae
- Genus: Kessleria
- Species: K. apenninica

Binomial name
- Kessleria apenninica Huemer & Mutanen, 2015

= Kessleria apenninica =

Species of moth

Kessleria apenninica is a moth species of the family Yponomeutidae. It is found only in the Apennines in central Italy. The habitat consists of rocky areas on calcareous soil.

The length of the forewings is 5.8–6.9 mm for males. The forewings of the males are white, mottled with black. The black dots on the veins and in the terminal area. There is a black patch near the base and an oblique blackish fascia at about one-third to halfway. The hindwings are dark grey. Adults have been recorded on wing in late July.

The larvae probably feed on a Saxifraga species.

== Etymology ==
The species name refers to the Apennines, where all type specimens have been collected.
