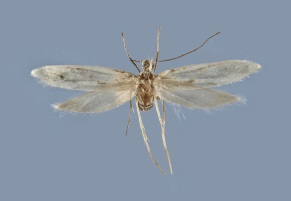
- Female
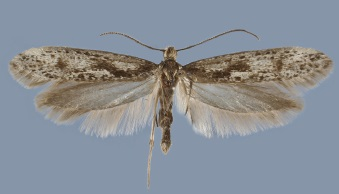
- Male

Scientific classification
- Kingdom: Animalia
- Phylum: Arthropoda
- Clade: Pancrustacea
- Class: Insecta
- Order: Lepidoptera
- Family: Yponomeutidae
- Genus: Kessleria
- Species: K. wehrlii

Binomial name
- Kessleria wehrlii Huemer & Tarmann, 1992

= Kessleria wehrlii =

Species of moth

Kessleria wehrlii is a moth of the family Yponomeutidae. It is found in France.

The length of the forewings is 8.1-9.5 mm for males and 6.2 mm for females. Adults have been recorded in July.

The larvae possibly feed on Saxifraga retusa.
