= Kessleria caflischiella =

Scientific classification
- Kingdom: Animalia
- Phylum: Arthropoda
- Class: Insecta
- Order: Lepidoptera
- Family: Yponomeutidae
- Genus: Kessleria
- Species: K. caflischiella

Binomial name
- Kessleria caflischiella (Frey, 1880) Friese, 1960

Synonyms
- Swammerdamia caflischiella Frey, 1880; Zelleria caflischiella (Frey, 1880) Meyrick, 1914

Species of moth

Kessleria caflischiella is a moth of the family Yponomeutidae. It is found in Switzerland, Austria and Italy.

The length of the forewings is 6.9–8.3 mm for males and 6.1–7.1 mm for females. Adults are on wing from the beginning of July to the beginning of September.

The larvae feed on Saxifraga moschata. They live in a spinning (a shelter like the web of a spider).
