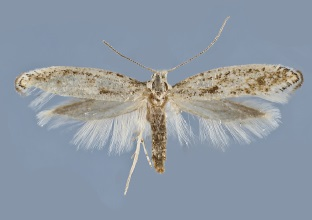
- Female
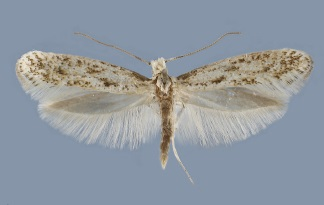
- Male

Scientific classification
- Domain: Eukaryota
- Kingdom: Animalia
- Phylum: Arthropoda
- Class: Insecta
- Order: Lepidoptera
- Family: Yponomeutidae
- Genus: Kessleria
- Species: K. albescens

Binomial name
- Kessleria albescens (Rebel, 1899)

Synonyms
- Hofmannia albescens Rebel, 1899

= Kessleria albescens =

Species of moth

Kessleria albescens is a moth of the family Yponomeutidae. It is found in France, Italy and Austria.

The length of the forewings is 6–7.3 mm for males and 5.1–6.1 mm for females. Adults are on wing from July to September.

The larvae feed on Saxifraga paniculata. Young larvae mine the leaves of their host plant.
