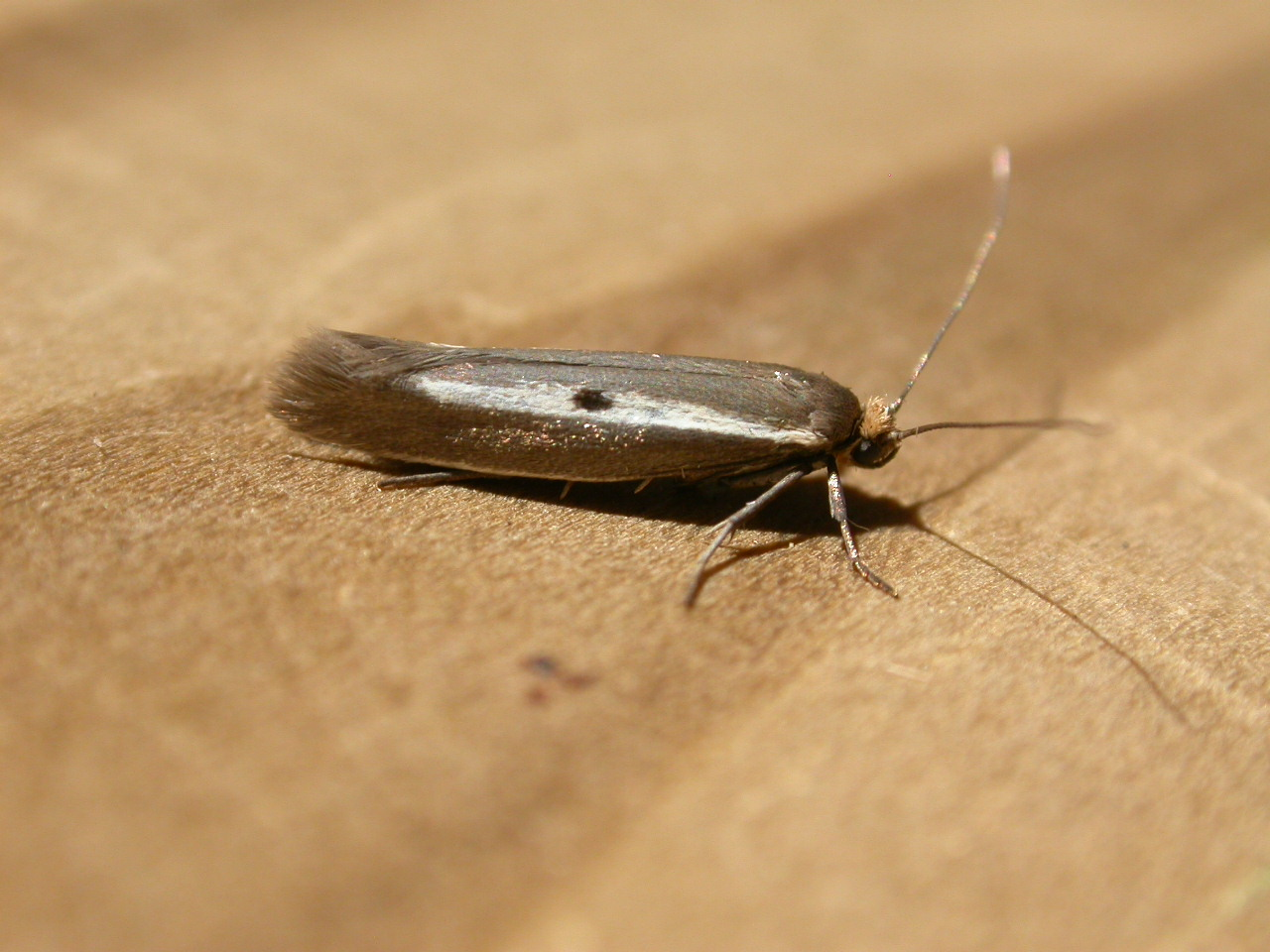

Scientific classification
- Domain: Eukaryota
- Kingdom: Animalia
- Phylum: Arthropoda
- Class: Insecta
- Order: Lepidoptera
- Family: Yponomeutidae
- Genus: Parahyponomeuta
- Species: P. egregiella

Binomial name
- Parahyponomeuta egregiella (Duponchel, 1838)

Synonyms
- Butalis egregiella Duponchel, 1839

= Parahyponomeuta egregiella =

Species of moth

Parahyponomeuta egregiella is a moth of the family Yponomeutidae. It is known from the Iberian Peninsula, Italy, Sardinia, Corsica, France, Switzerland and Luxembourg.
