= Kessleria albanica =

Scientific classification
- Domain: Eukaryota
- Kingdom: Animalia
- Phylum: Arthropoda
- Class: Insecta
- Order: Lepidoptera
- Family: Yponomeutidae
- Genus: Kessleria
- Species: K. albanica

Binomial name
- Kessleria albanica Friese, 1960

Species of moth

Kessleria albanica is a moth of the family Yponomeutidae. It is found in Serbia and Montenegro and Albania.

The length of the forewings is 7.5–7.8 mm. Adults have been recorded in July.
