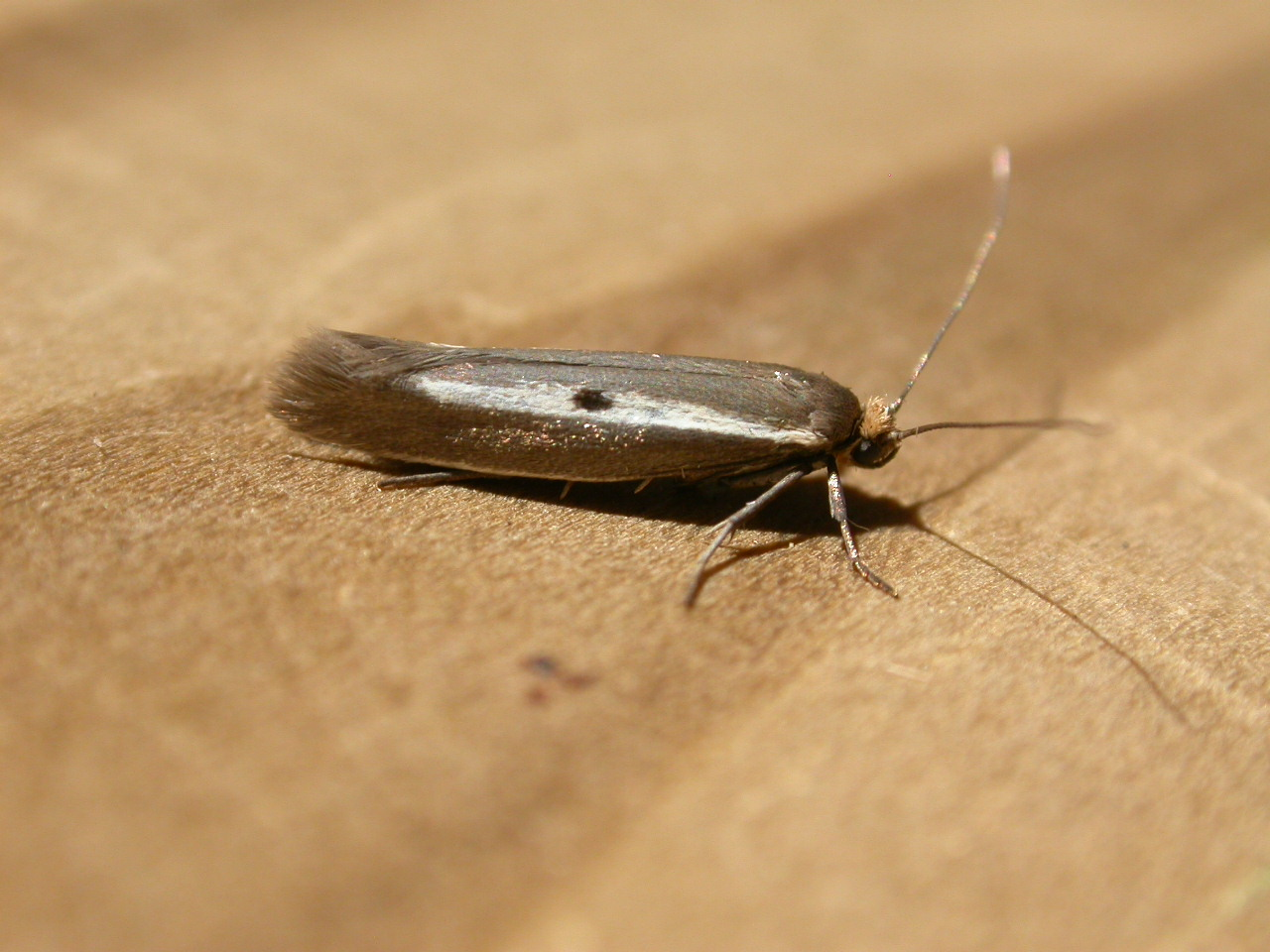
- Parahyponomeuta egregiella

Scientific classification
- Domain: Eukaryota
- Kingdom: Animalia
- Phylum: Arthropoda
- Class: Insecta
- Order: Lepidoptera
- Family: Yponomeutidae
- Subfamily: Yponomeutinae
- Genus: Parahyponomeuta; Toll, 1941

Type species
- Parahyponomeuta egregiella (Duponchel, 1839)

= Parahyponomeuta =

Genus of moths

Parahyponomeuta is a genus of moths of the family Yponomeutidae.

== Species ==
- Parahyponomeuta bakeri (Walsingham, 1894) (from Madeira)
- Parahyponomeuta egregiella (Duponchel, 1839) (palearctic)
- Parahyponomeuta malgassaella Viette, 1955 (from Madagascar)
