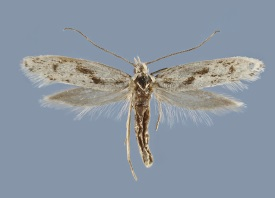
- Female
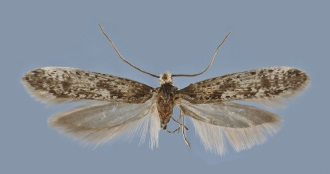
- Male

Scientific classification
- Kingdom: Animalia
- Phylum: Arthropoda
- Clade: Pancrustacea
- Class: Insecta
- Order: Lepidoptera
- Family: Yponomeutidae
- Genus: Kessleria
- Species: K. alpmaritimae

Binomial name
- Kessleria alpmaritimae Huemer & Mutanen, 2015

= Kessleria alpmaritimae =

Species of moth

Kessleria alpmaritimae is a moth of the family Yponomeutidae. It is found only in the Marguareis Massif, in the French Alpes Maritimes. The habitat consists of rocky areas on calcareous soil.

The length of the forewings is 7-8.5 mm for males and 5.9–6.3 mm for females. The forewings of the males are blackish to dark grey-brown, intensely mottled with whitish scales, particularly from the basal fifth to four-fifths. The veins have distinct black dots, particularly along the costa, subcosta, cubital and anal veins, while the medial and radial veins have indistinct brown lines. There is an oblique blackish fascia at about one-third to halfway. The termen is dark grey-brown. The hindwings are dark grey. The ground colour of the forewings of the females is whitish, mottled with a few black scales, particularly along the veins. There are patches of black scales near the base and at the distal end of the cell and there is an oblique blackish fascia at about one-third to halfway, separated into two dashes. The termen is whitish with some blackish dots in the apical part. The hindwings are grey. Adults have been recorded on wing in late July.

== Etymology ==
The species name refers to the area of the type locality, the Alpes Maritimes.
