= Kessleria brevicornuta =

Scientific classification
- Kingdom: Animalia
- Phylum: Arthropoda
- Clade: Pancrustacea
- Class: Insecta
- Order: Lepidoptera
- Family: Yponomeutidae
- Genus: Kessleria
- Species: K. brevicornuta

Binomial name
- Kessleria brevicornuta Huemer & Tarmann, 1992

Species of moth

Kessleria brevicornuta is a moth of the family Yponomeutidae. It is found in central Spain.
