= Kessleria albomaculata =

Scientific classification
- Kingdom: Animalia
- Phylum: Arthropoda
- Clade: Pancrustacea
- Class: Insecta
- Order: Lepidoptera
- Family: Yponomeutidae
- Genus: Kessleria
- Species: K. albomaculata

Binomial name
- Kessleria albomaculata Huemer & Tarmann, 1992

Species of moth

Kessleria albomaculata is a moth of the family Yponomeutidae. It is found in France.

The length of the forewings is 7.3-7.5 mm. Adults have been recorded in July.
