= Parahyponomeuta bakeri =

Scientific classification
- Domain: Eukaryota
- Kingdom: Animalia
- Phylum: Arthropoda
- Class: Insecta
- Order: Lepidoptera
- Family: Yponomeutidae
- Genus: Parahyponomeuta
- Species: P. bakeri

Binomial name
- Parahyponomeuta bakeri (Walsingham, 1894)

Synonyms
- Hyponomeuta bakeri Walsingham, 1894; Kessleria bakeri

Species of moth

Parahyponomeuta bakeri is a moth of the family Yponomeutidae. It is found on Madeira.

The wingspan is about 20 mm. The forewings are shining olive-brown with a white streak. The hindwings are brownish grey.
