= Kessleria hauderi =

Scientific classification
- Kingdom: Animalia
- Phylum: Arthropoda
- Clade: Pancrustacea
- Class: Insecta
- Order: Lepidoptera
- Family: Yponomeutidae
- Genus: Kessleria
- Species: K. hauderi

Binomial name
- Kessleria hauderi Huemer & Tarmann, 1992

Species of moth

Kessleria hauderi is a moth of the family Yponomeutidae and is found in Austria.

The length of the forewings is 8-9.3 mm for males and 6.1-7.1 mm for females. Adults are on wing from the beginning of July to mid August.
