= Kessleria nivescens =

Scientific classification
- Domain: Eukaryota
- Kingdom: Animalia
- Phylum: Arthropoda
- Class: Insecta
- Order: Lepidoptera
- Family: Yponomeutidae
- Genus: Kessleria
- Species: K. nivescens

Binomial name
- Kessleria nivescens Burmann, 1980

Species of moth

Kessleria nivescens is a moth of the family Yponomeutidae. It is found in Italy, Slovenia and Austria.

The length of the forewings is 8-9.6 mm for males and 6.9–8 mm for females. Adults are on wing from mid July to the beginning of September.

The larvae feed on Saxifraga caesia and Saxifraga tombeaensis.
