= Kessleria malgassaella =

Scientific classification
- Kingdom: Animalia
- Phylum: Arthropoda
- Class: Insecta
- Order: Lepidoptera
- Family: Yponomeutidae
- Genus: Kessleria
- Species: K. malgassaella

Binomial name
- Kessleria malgassaella (Viette, 1954)

Synonyms
- Parahyponomeuta malgassaella Viette, 1954

Species of moth

Kessleria malgassaella is a moth of the family Yponomeutidae. It is found in Madagascar.

The length of the forewings is about 9–10 mm, with a wingspan of 19.5–21 mm. The antennae and palpi are mouse grey. Head, thorax and abdomen are light grey, the underside of the body dark grey. The forewings are mouse grey with black dots. Hindwings are uniformly silky grey.

The holotype provided from Bekily from southern Madagascar.
