= Trift Glacier Foreland =

Coordinates: 46°41′40″N 8°21′27″E

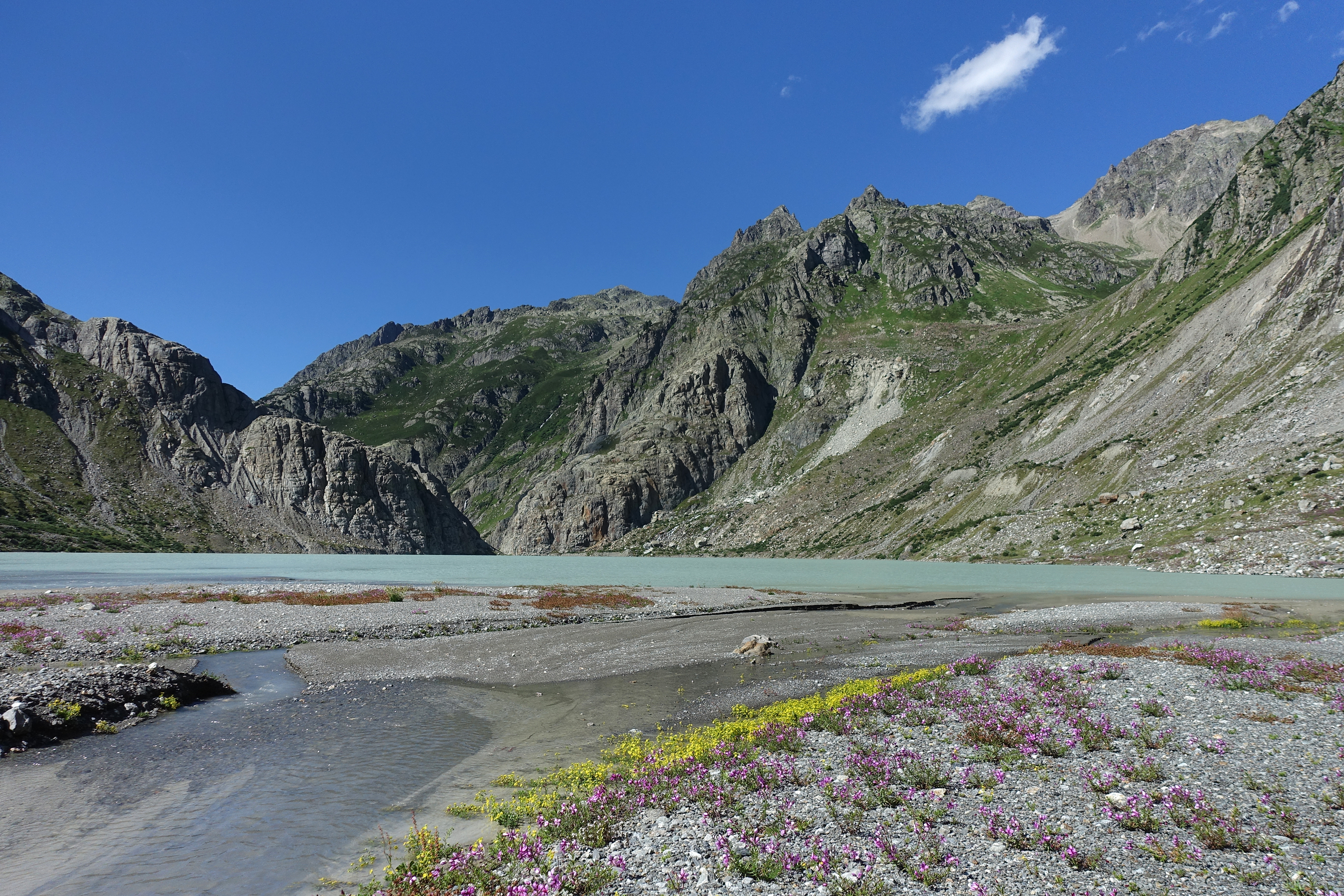
In the alpine alluvial plain and on the delta on the southern shore of Lake Trift, Alpine willowherb (Epilobium fleischeri) and yellow mountain saxifrage (Saxifraga anizoides), typical pioneer plants of alluvions and moraines, have colonised the area.

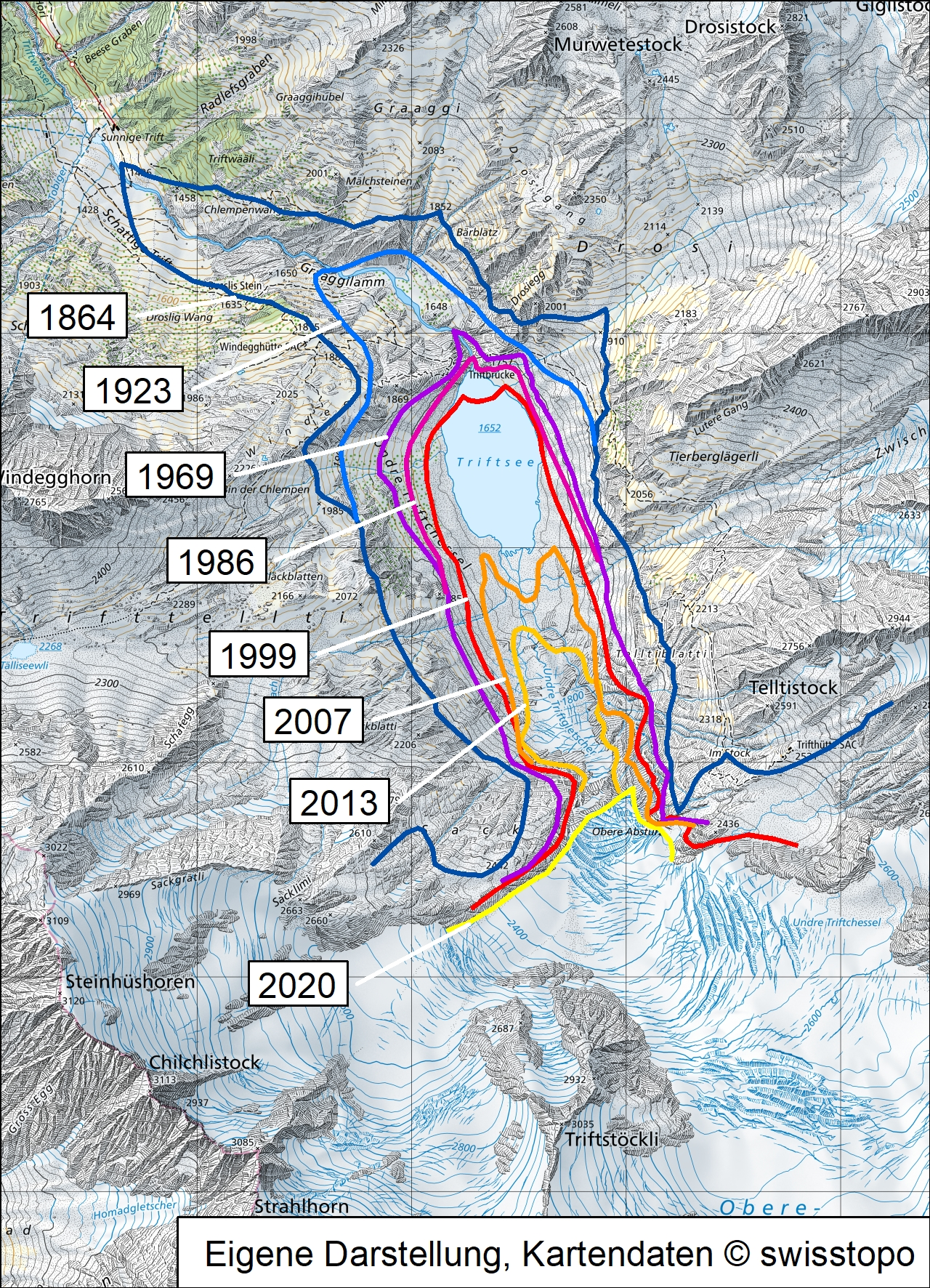
The retreat of the Trift Glacier since 1864

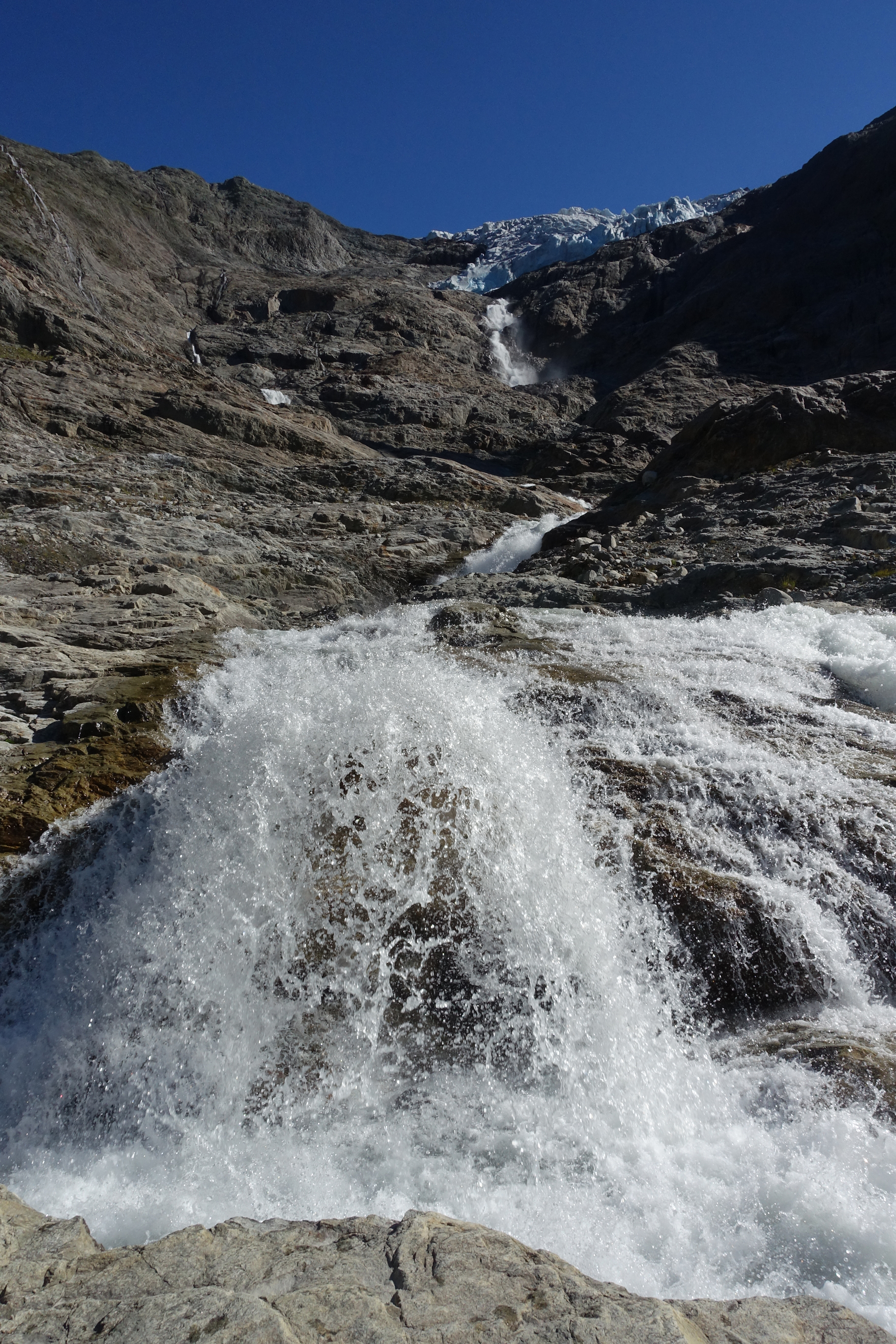
The Trift river cascades down from the glacier tongue over the rock step to the natural Trift lake.

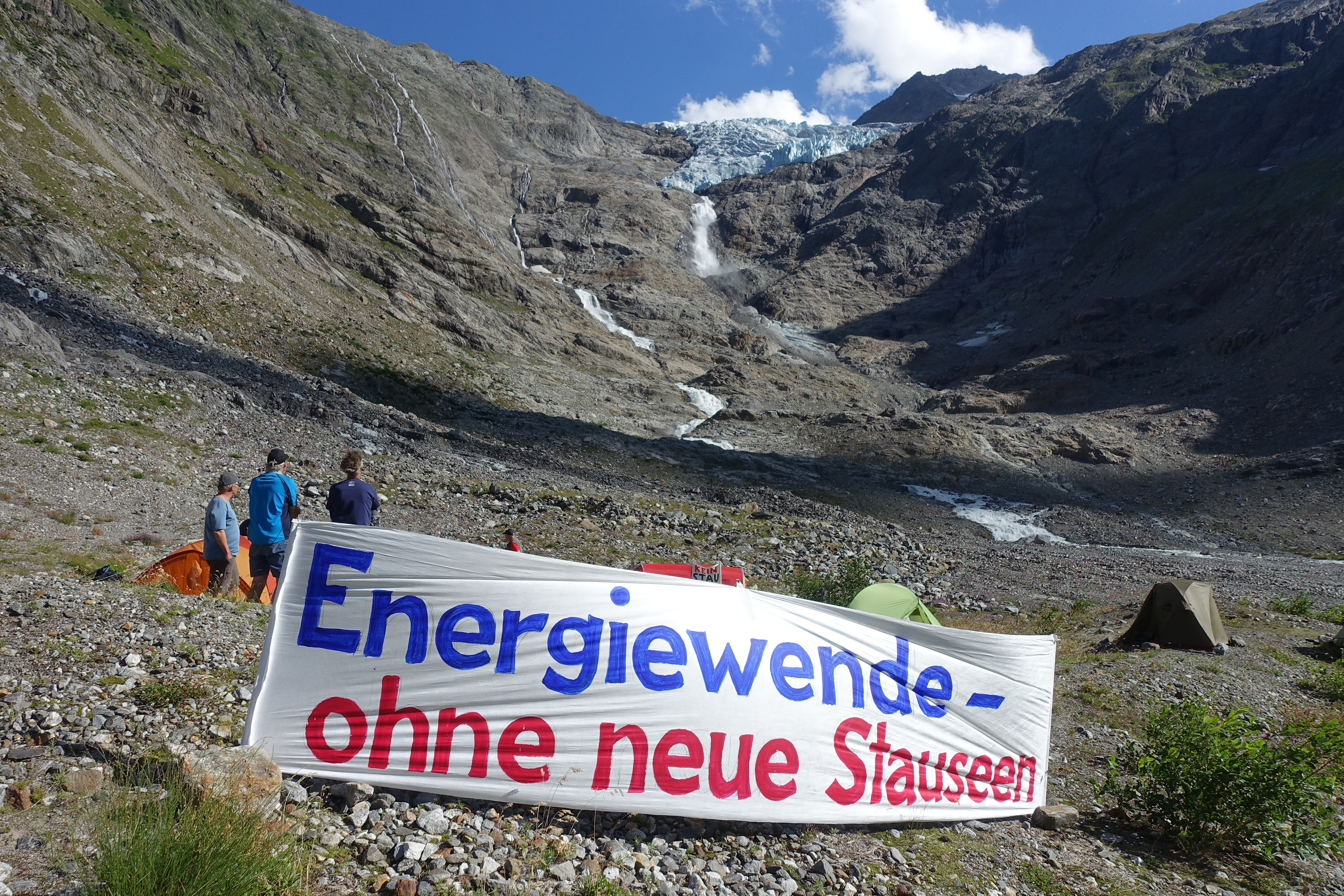
Protest action against the construction of a dam in the glacier forefield of the Trift Glacier, summer 2019

The Trift glacier foreland in the Swiss canton of Bern comprises a wide variety of geomorphological forms and habitats for pioneers and plant communities. At the southern end of Lake Trift, a delta is emerging and an alpine alluvial plain represents a biologically valuable area for a variety of species, some of which are rare and endangered. The Trift basin also harbours potential for generating electricity from a hydroelectric power plant, which is currently being planned.

== Position ==
The Trift glacier forefield lies in the retreat area of the Trift Glacier in the municipality of Innertkirchen, Canton of Bern, between the Susten Pass and the Grimsel Pass. It extends from the glacier break-off (approx. 2300 m above sea level) to the Sunnige Trift (1325 m a. sea level) below the Graaggilamm. The area is drained by the Triftwasser, which flows into the Gadmerwasser. At 1650 metres above sea level lies the Triftsee, which is dammed by a natural narrows. An alpine alluvial plain formed at its southern end, where the Triftwasser branches into several arms and forms the first meanders.

== Nature ==
=== Diversity of forms in the landscape ===
According to Mary Leibundgut, who surveyed the area in 2022 using the method developed by the Federal Office for the Environment for the inventory of alluvial zones and updated in 2021, the glacier left behind a variety of different landscape forms. Noticeable features include glacial polish areas, roches moutonnées, drainage channels in the rock and the canyon. In addition to these forms of erosion, forms of accumulation are also present, such as the lateral moraine walls that are still visible in places or the fine-grained ground moraine on the south side of the lake Trift. Outwash plaines, old courses, ponds, river delta, lake and the active, inactive and relict glaciofluvial areas document the dynamics of the Triftwasser and its tributaries.

=== Geology ===
The glacier forefield lies entirely in the crystalline rocks of the Aarmassif. In addition to the primary gneisses, a narrow band of volcanic rocks outcrop is also exposed in the area of the SAC hut Trift. Volcanic conglomerates and quartz-rich vulcanites (rhyolite), can therefore also be found in the moraine material of the Trift Glacier. Particularly striking are the huge blocks of amphibolite clods deposited in the glacier foreland, which originate from the Gwächtenhorn area and were transported over long distances by the glacier. The dark amphibolite clods are embedded in a light-coloured, melted granite mass.

The Trift area is characterised by tectonic fault lines, most of which run parallel to the longitudinal extension of the Aarmassif (WSW-ENE) and transverse to the flow direction of the glacier or the valley axis of the Trift river. The dominant landscape element is the striking terrain line that runs from south-west to north-east from the Furtwangsattel over the rocky ridge of Windegg and Drosiegg towards the Steilimmi. It acts like a natural dam, behind which the ice of the Trift glacier has carved out an overdeepened basin and which is cut through by the Triftwasser in a narrow canyon. The natural Trift lake, which has been formed since around 1999, is a typical cirque lake.

Fault lines running at right angles to the valley axis also lead to a special situation in the rock step below today's glacier break-off: under high pressure under the glacier ice, they were carved out to form deep drainage channels that divert the torrent at right angles to the direction of flow. Today, the Triftwasser plunges over the rock step in a 150 m high waterfall, only to disappear into a deep channel and emerge again 200 m further east, flowing down in a series of cascades to the alluvial plain on the southern shore of the lake Trift.

== Vegetation ==
Mary Leibundgut observed a total of 27 different vegetation units in 2022. Predominant are various pioneer communities on silicate rubble, including silicate fine rubble flora, especially on the southern shore of the lake Trift in the hilly ground moraine areas. The Epilobion fleischeri with Fleischer's willowherb is widespread and is one of the habitat types worthy of protection according to the Ordinance on the Protection of Nature and Cultural Heritage. Among the transitional communities are tall grass meadows with Agrostis schraderiana, Calamagrostion. In the lower area of the glacier forefield, the alpine pastures and mixed grasslands, which are grazed by sheep, are partly degenerated and species-poor. Bristlegrass (Nardus stricta) is widespread throughout the foreland, but typically formed Bristlegrass pastures are rare. Large areas in the foreland are occupied by scrub communities, including above all the green alder scrub. The green alder has a long tradition in the area. Thanks to its flexible branches, this pioneer shrub can withstand heavy snow loads and avalanches.

The area from the south bank of the lake towards the Trift Glacier forms an alpine alluvial plain.

== Fauna ==
In her aquatic biology report, ecologist Verena Lubini-Ferlin identifies 58 species of aquatic insects in the Triftwasser, Steiwasser and in the alluvial plain at the southern end of Lake Trift. Of these, two species are on the Red List, ten are potentially endangered, seven are national priority species, four are Alpine endemics and five species are considered vulnerable. Water beetles, bugs, caddisflies, stoneflies, mayflies and dragonflies live in the alpine alluvial plain of the glacier forefield of the Trift. Some are characteristic Alpine species such as the water beetle Hydroporus foveolatus and the water bugs (also known as water striders) Arctocarisa carinata and Gerris costae. In addition, three source types revitalise these habitats: Dictyogenus fontium, Consorophylax consors and the two-toothed goldenring (Cordulegaster bidentata). There is also evidence of an absolute habitat specialist, the caddisfly Stactobia moselyi, whose larvae live exclusively on trickling rock faces.

== Tourism ==
Alpinists have been interested in this area since the middle of the 19th century. The first Trift hut was built on the spur of the Telltistock in 1864. The first Windegg hut followed in 1891. Both huts were not far from the Trift glacier at the time.

Since the construction of the first pedestrian suspension bridge over the canyon at Trift lake in 2004, the former works railway, which was created with the water catchment in the Sunnigen Trift, has been open to the public. The suspension bridge known as the Triftbrücke was replaced by a new, safer one in 2009. The bridge attracts many tourists. Sport climbers use the climbing routes that have been set up in the area around the Windegghütte in recent years. At around 170 m long and 100 m high, the Trift bridge is one of the largest pedestrian bridges in the Alps.

== Power plant project and resistance ==
Lake Trift was formed naturally when the Trift Glacier melted in the lower Trift basin as a result of global warming. What remained was a naturally dammed lake, the lake Trift, created by the rock barrier at Windegg/Drosiegg. For years, the company based here, Kraftwerke Oberhasli (KWO), a subsidiary of Berner Kraftwerke (BKW), has been planning to dam up around 85 million cubic metres of water with a dam wall over a hundred metres high, which corresponds to an energy content of 215 GWh. According to its own information, the plant could generate 145 GWh of additional electricity per year and store energy.

KWO involved environmental protection organisations in its planning at an early stage, as the reservoir would flood large areas of valuable habitats. The negotiation process led to numerous compromises. In the end, Swiss Alpine Club, World Wide Fund for Nature, Pro Natura and the Bernese Fishing Association approved the Trift reservoir project. The Naturfreunde, Aqua Viva, the Grimselverein, the Triftkomitee and the Klimaspuren campaign report resistance. In June 2023 the Bernese cantonal parliament gave the KWO the green light to build the project. Environmental organisations remain divided, with some continuing to oppose the construction of a dam on Lake Trift. On 27 December 2023, Aqua Viva and the Grimsel Association lodged an appeal with the Bern Administrative Court against the granting of the licence by the Grand Council of the Canton of Bern.

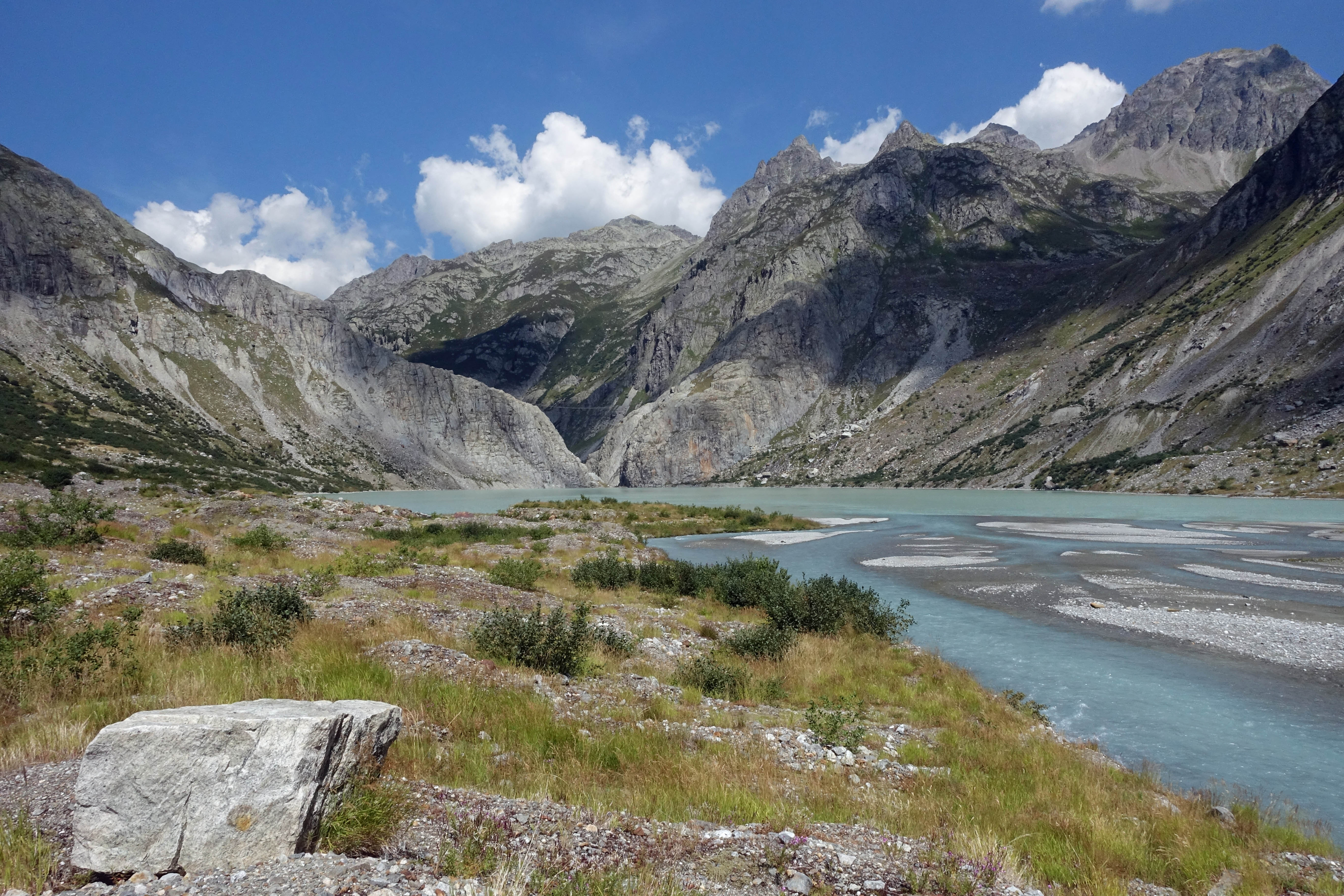
Hilly ground moraine landscape with lots of fine material and a large alluvial plain

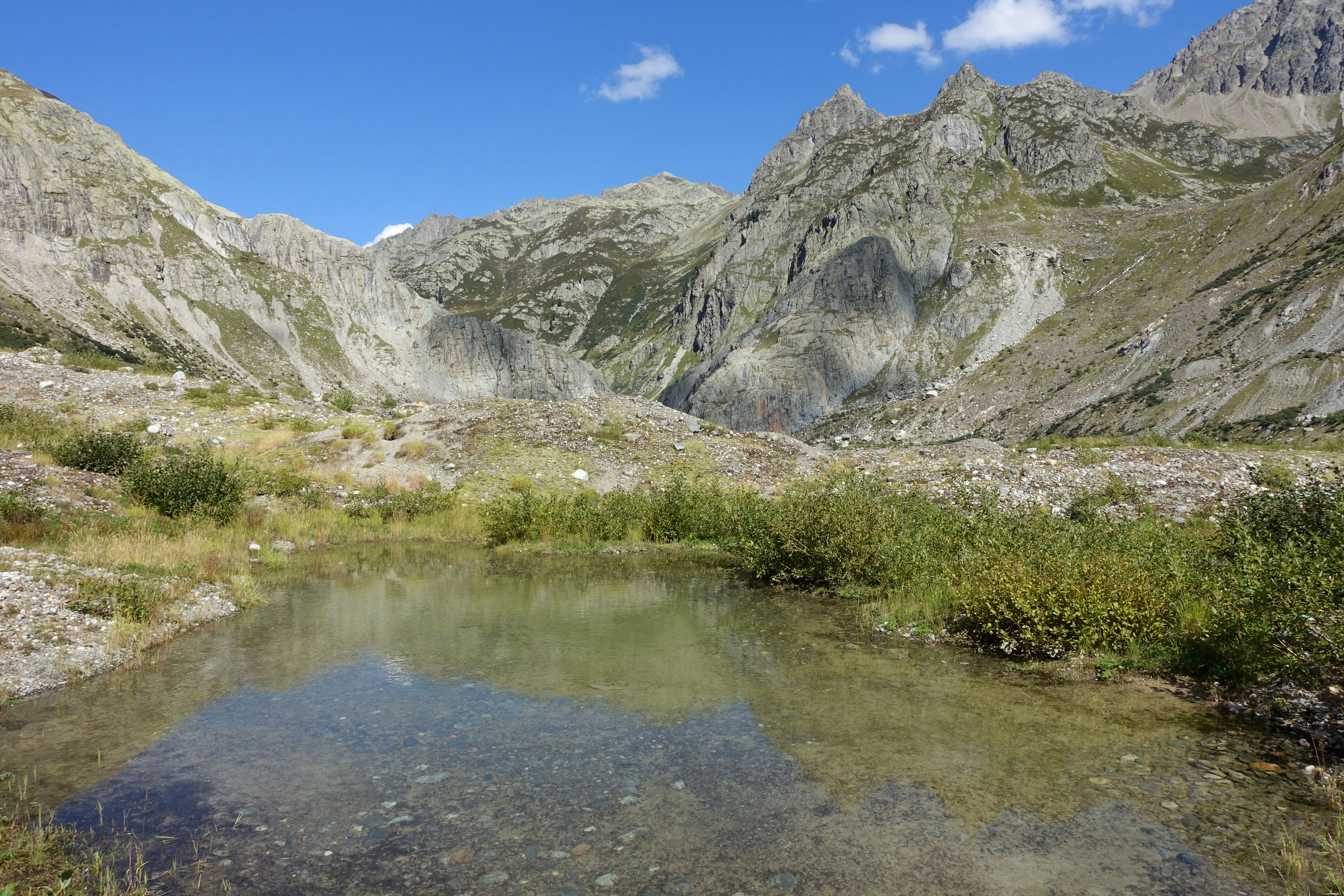
Ground moraine landscape with ponds and first bog species and amphibians

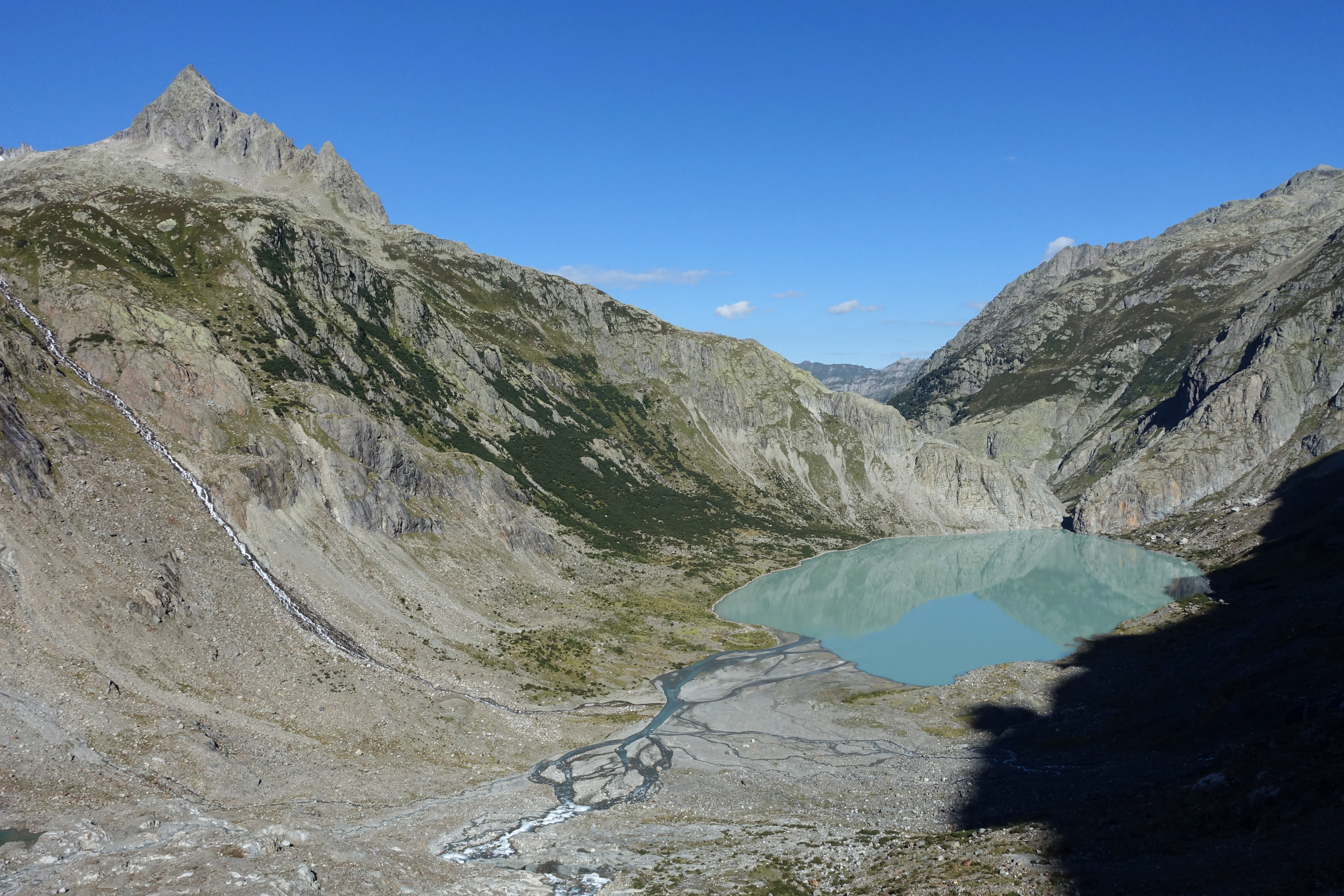
Delta and alluvial plain, which would be flooded if the planned dam were built.

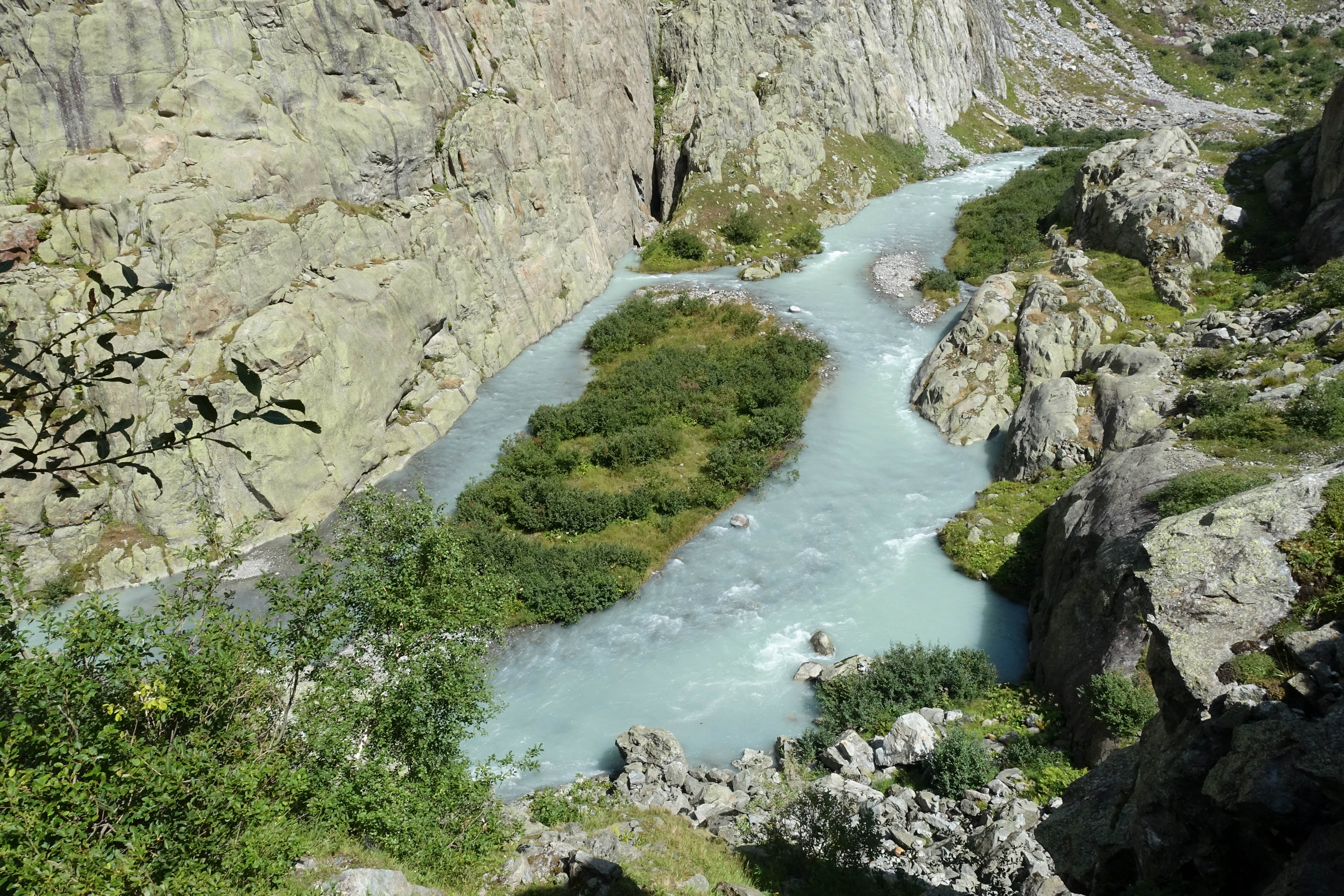
In the Graaggiboden, the Triftwasser branches out into a small alluvial plain.

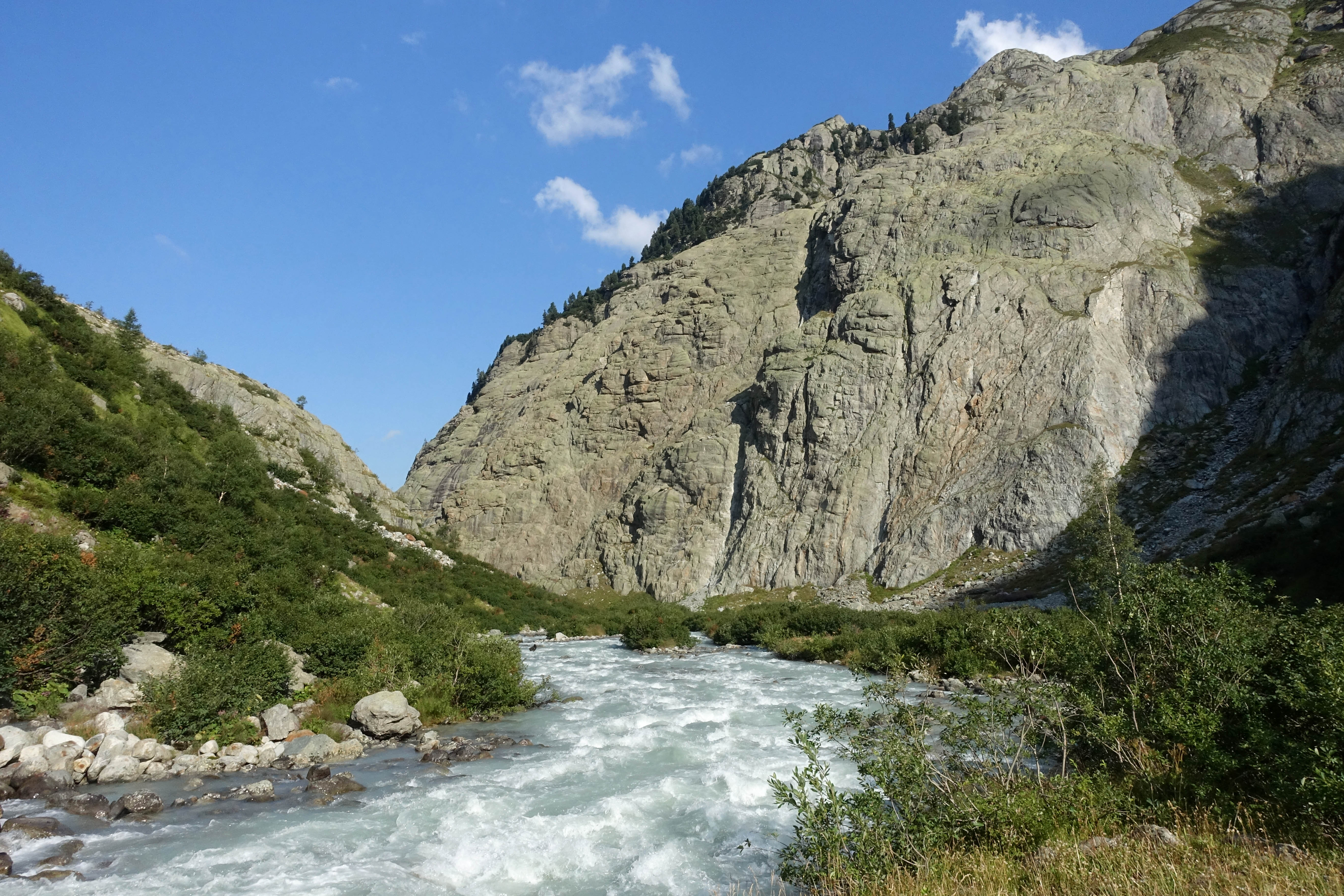
The construction of a dam would reduce the torrent to a small amount of residual water and ...

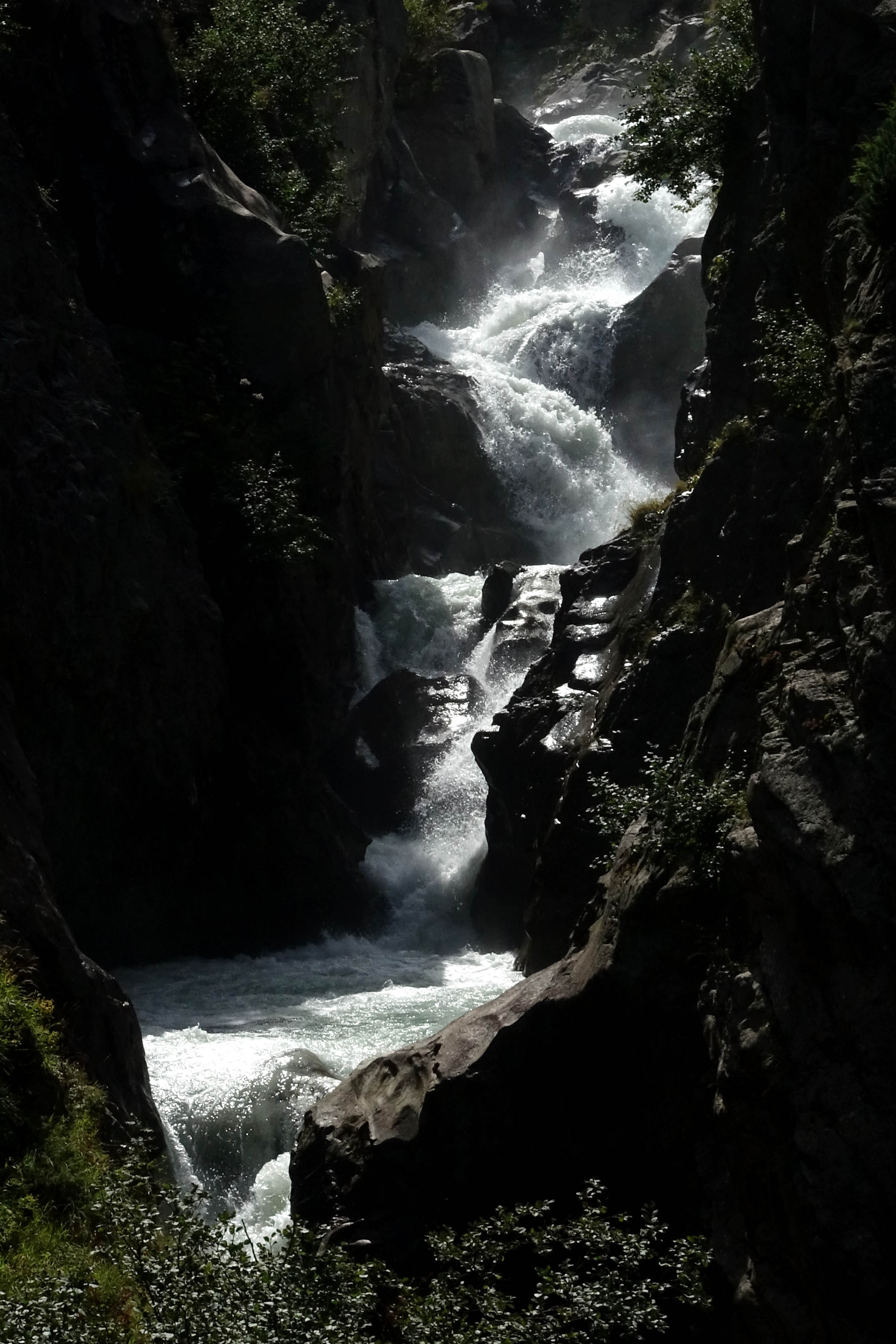
... would be a trickle in the Graaggilamm.

== See also ==
- Lake Trift, map by Swisstopo
- Trift – ein Exempel, movie by Menk Rufibach and Dina Gafner, subtitled in German
