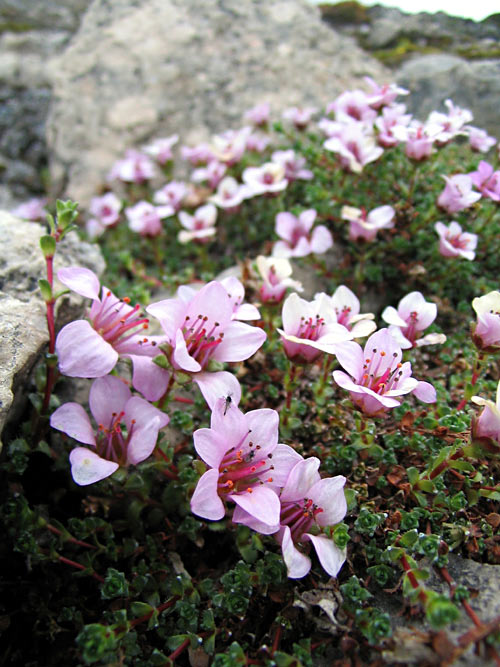
- In Svalbard

Scientific classification
- Kingdom: Plantae
- Clade: Tracheophytes
- Clade: Angiosperms
- Clade: Eudicots
- Order: Saxifragales
- Family: Saxifragaceae
- Genus: Saxifraga
- Species: S. oppositifolia

Binomial name
- Saxifraga oppositifolia L.

= Saxifraga oppositifolia =

Species of flowering plant

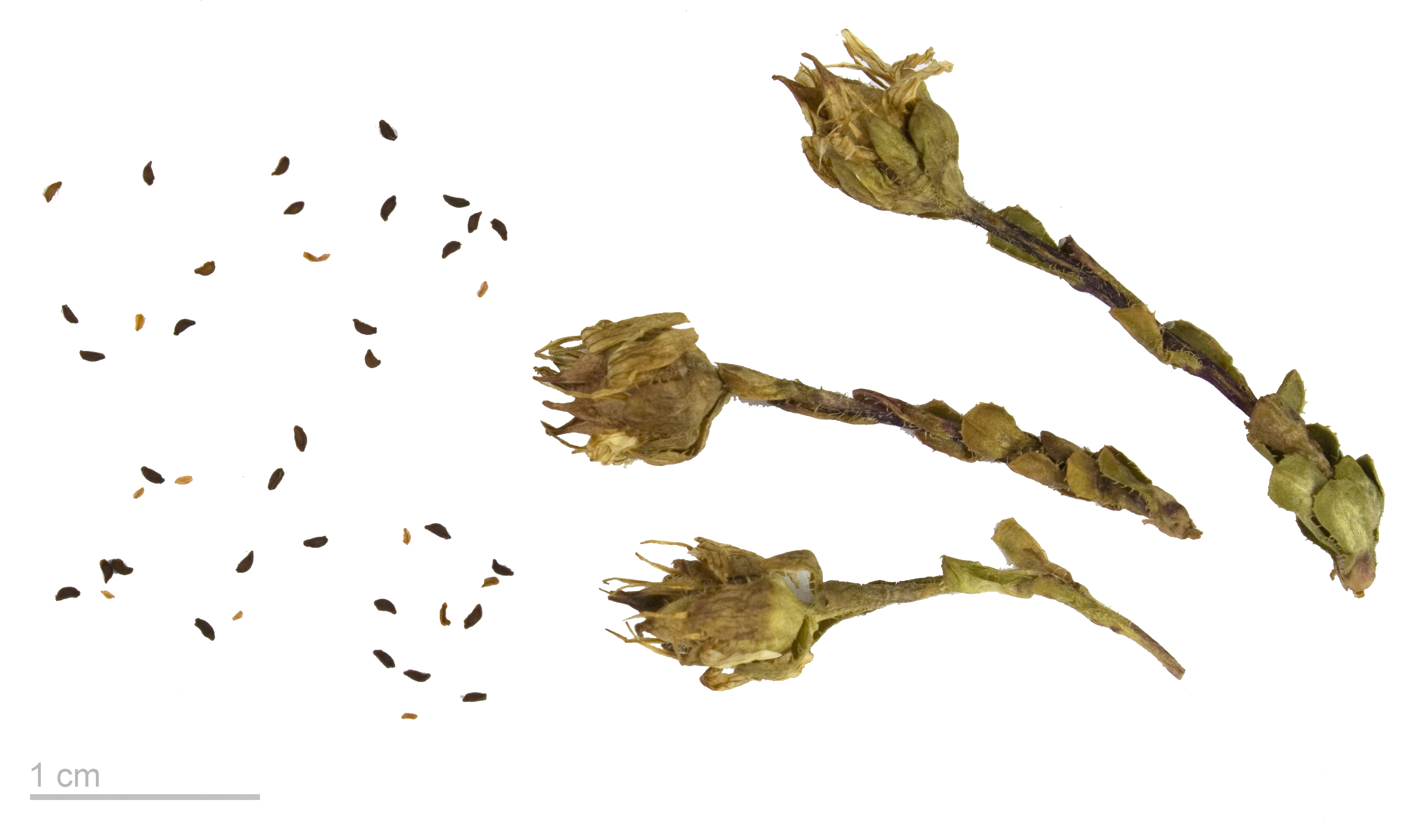
Fruits and seeds - MHNT

Saxifraga oppositifolia, the purple saxifrage or purple mountain saxifrage, is a species of plant that is very common in the high Arctic and also some high mountainous areas further south, including northern Britain, the Alps and the Rocky Mountains.

Saxifraga oppositifolia grows at a latitude of 83°40'N on Kaffeklubben Island, making it one of the northernmost plants in the world.

== Description ==
Saxifraga oppositifolia is a low-growing, densely or loosely matted plant growing up to 5 cm (2 in) high, with somewhat woody branches of creeping or trailing habit close to the surface. The leaves are small, rounded, scale-like, opposite in four rows with ciliated margins. The flowers are solitary on short stalks, petals purple or lilac, much longer than the calyx lobes. It is one of the first spring flowers, continuing to flower during the whole summer in localities where the snow melts later. The flowers grow to about 1 cm (1/2 in) in diameter.

== Ecology ==
=== Habitat ===
Saxifraga oppositifolia grows in all kinds of cold temperate to Arctic habitats, usually found from sea level up to 1,000 m (3,300 ft), in many places colouring the landscape. Its native habitats include tundra, arctic coastal bluffs, alpine scree, and rock crevices.

Swiss botanist Christian Körner found the plant growing at an elevation of 4,505 m (14,780 ft) in the Swiss alps, making it the highest elevation angiosperm in Europe. It is even known to grow on Kaffeklubben Island in north Greenland, at 83°N 40°E, the most northerly plant locality in the world.

=== Species interactions ===
The flowers of Saxifraga oppositifolia may be consumed by certain animal species, such as the caterpillars of the cold-adapted Gynaephora groenlandica, the Arctic woolly-bear caterpillar.

== Uses ==
Saxifraga oppositifolia is a popular plant in alpine gardens, though difficult to grow in warm climates.

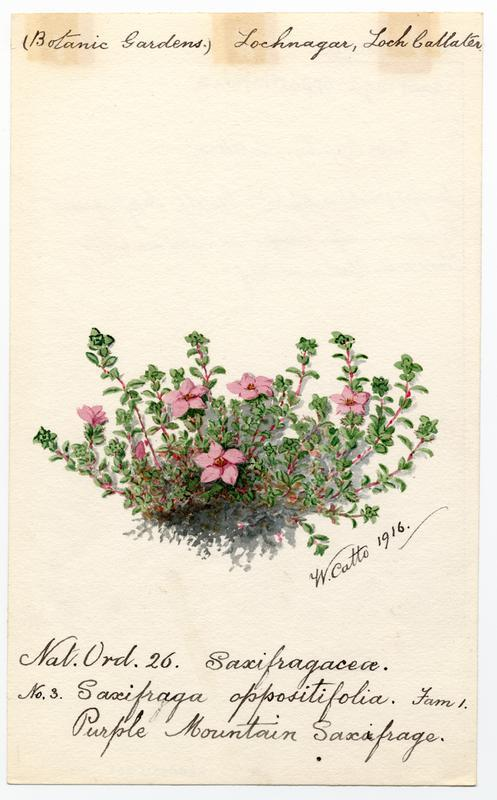
Purple Mountain Saxifrage (Saxifraga oppositifolia) by William Catto (1916)

The edible flower petals are eaten, particularly in parts of Nunavut without abundant berries. They are bitter at first but then become sweet. They are also slightly sticky.

It is known to the Inuit as aupilaktunnguat. The leaves and stems are brewed for herbal tea. According to many Nunavummiut, the tea is best later in the season once the flowers have died.

Saxifraga oppositifolia serves as the territorial flower of Nunavut in Canada, a symbolic flower of Nordland county in Norway, and the county flower of County Londonderry in Northern Ireland.

== Taxonomy ==
There are a few subspecies of Saxifraga oppositifolia, including:

- Saxifraga oppositifolia ssp. glandulisepala Hultén – native to Alaska
- Saxifraga oppositifolia ssp. oppositifolia L. – native to continental US
- Saxifraga oppositifolia ssp. smalliana (Engl. & Irmsch.) Hultén – native to Alaska
