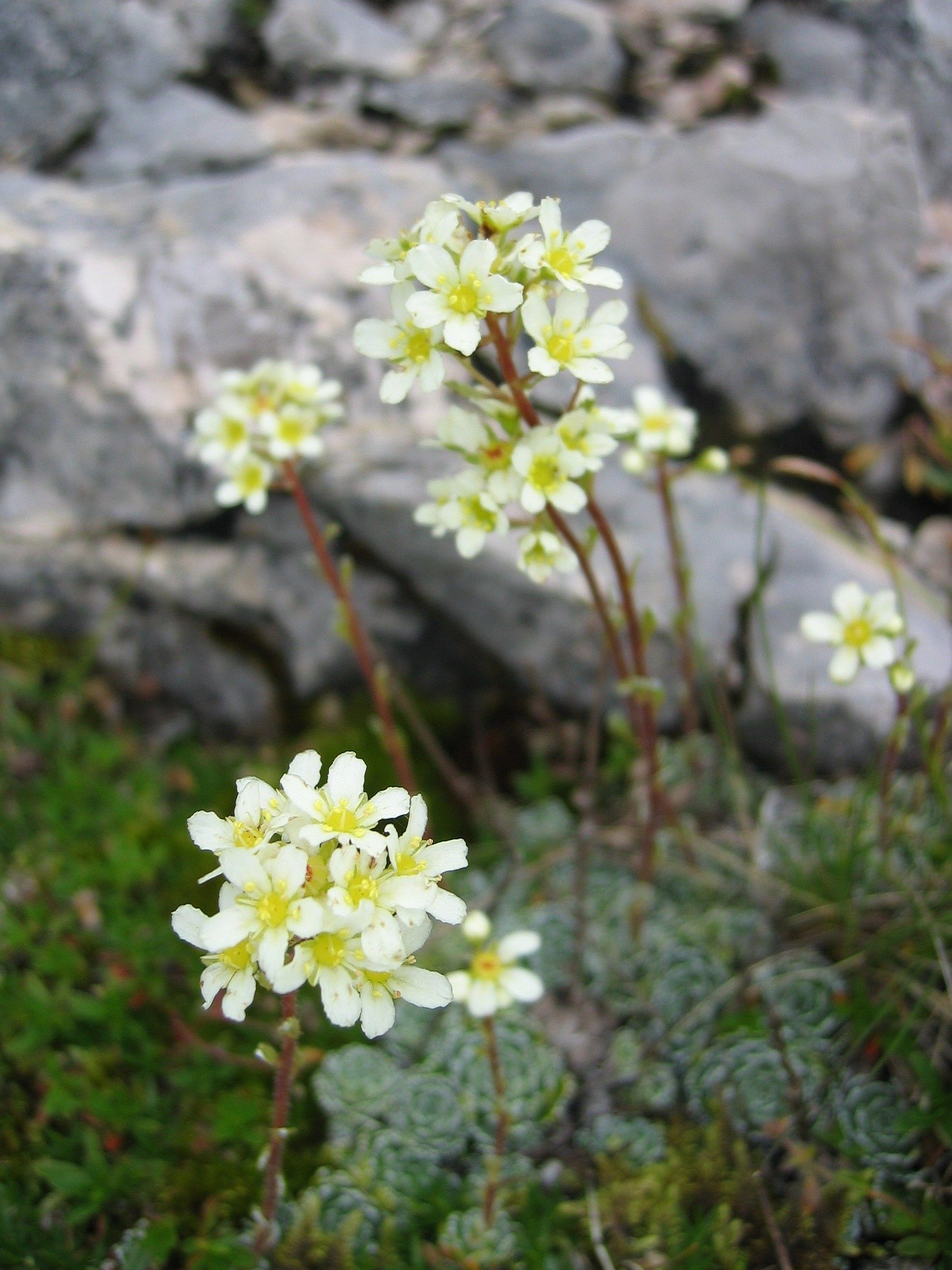

Scientific classification
- Kingdom: Plantae
- Clade: Tracheophytes
- Clade: Angiosperms
- Clade: Eudicots
- Order: Saxifragales
- Family: Saxifragaceae
- Genus: Saxifraga
- Species: S. paniculata

Binomial name
- Saxifraga paniculata Mill.

Synonyms
- Synonyms: Chondrosea aizoon (Jacq.) Haw.; Chondrosea aizoopsis Jord. & Fourr.; Chondrosea alpicola Jord. & Fourr.; Chondrosea beugesiaca Jord. & Fourr.; Chondrosea brevicaulis Jord. & Fourr.; Chondrosea calcarea Jord. & Fourr.; Chondrosea carthusiana Jord. & Fourr.; Chondrosea cartilaginea (Willd.) Haw.; Chondrosea flexipes Jord. & Fourr.; Chondrosea glabrata Jord. & Fourr.; Chondrosea glareosa Jord. & Fourr.; Chondrosea gracilescens Jord. & Fourr.; Chondrosea laevigata Jord. & Fourr.; Chondrosea leptopetala Jord. & Fourr.; Chondrosea orophila Jord. & Fourr.; Chondrosea paniculata (Mill.) Á.Löve; Chondrosea patulipes Jord. & Fourr.; Chondrosea petrophila Jord. & Fourr.; Chondrosea punctillata Jord. & Fourr.; Chondrosea pusilla Jord. & Fourr.; Chondrosea refracta Jord. & Fourr.; Chondrosea rosella Jord. & Fourr.; Chondrosea rosularis Haw.; Chondrosea valida Jord. & Fourr.; Chondrosea virgata Jord. & Fourr.; Chondrosea viridula Jord. & Fourr.; Saxifraga aizoon Jacq.; Saxifraga carinthiaca Schott; Saxifraga cartilaginea Willd.; Saxifraga chlorantha Dulac nom. illeg.; Saxifraga compacta Hegetschw. nom. illeg.; Saxifraga cordi Bubani; Saxifraga cultrata Schott; Saxifraga dilatata Schott; Saxifraga elatior Wimm. nom. illeg.; Saxifraga intacta Willd.; Saxifraga kolenatiana Regel; Saxifraga laeta Schott; Saxifraga maculata Schrank; Saxifraga malyi Schott; Saxifraga neglecta Ten.; Saxifraga notata Schott; Saxifraga recta Lapeyr.; Saxifraga robusta Schott; Saxifraga rosularis Haw.; Saxifraga stabiana Ten.; Saxifraga stenoglossa Tausch ex Schott; Saxifraga sturmiana Schott; Saxifraga zeleborii Schott

= Saxifraga paniculata =

Species of flowering plant

Saxifraga paniculata is an alpine species of flowering plant in the saxifrage family, with native distribution in the temperate northern hemisphere. Common names include alpine saxifrage, encrusted saxifrage, lifelong saxifrage, lime-encrusted saxifrage, livelong saxifrage, white mountain saxifrage, and silver saxifrage.

== Taxonomy and naming ==
Saxifraga paniculata was first formally described in the eighth edition of The Gardeners Dictionary by the Scottish botanist Philip Miller in 1768 and is placed in the genus Saxifraga (the saxifrages) and in the family Saxifragaceae. The generic name Saxifraga literally means "stone-breaker", from Latin saxum ("rock" or "stone") + frangere ("to break"). It is usually thought to indicate a medicinal use for treatment of urinary calculi (such as kidney stones), rather than breaking rocks apart.

== Description ==
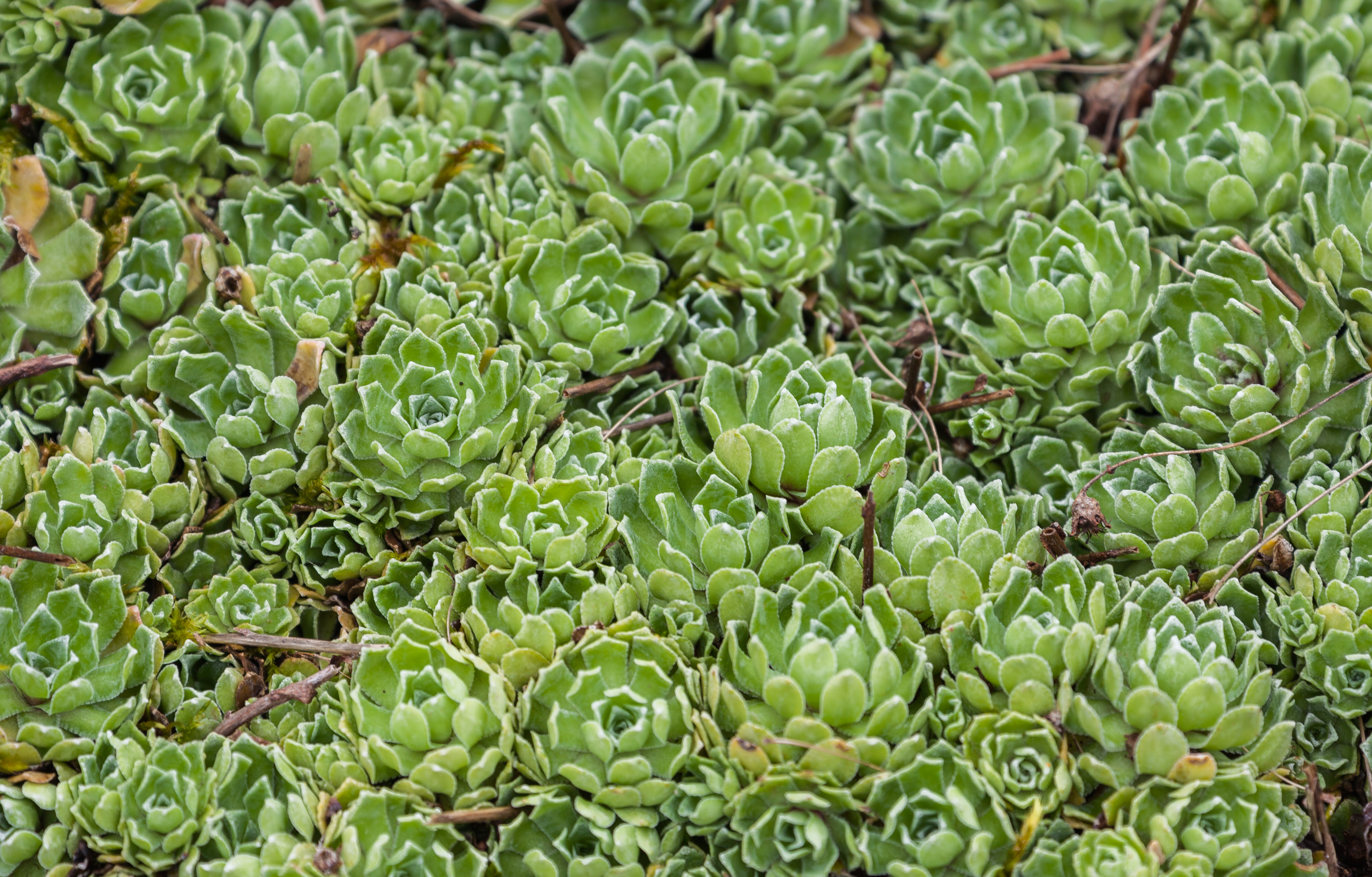
Plant without flower

Saxifraga paniculata is a perennial and stoloniferous herbaceous plant with flowering stems 10–30 cm in height. The most easily identifiable feature is its highly dense basal rosette of leaves, which are leathery, flat and stiff. 1–3 cm long, the oblong to ovate leaves are densely toothed and have fine leaf margins; a lime-encrusted white pore is present at the base of each leaf. The rosettes produce erect flowering stems (though nothing might be produced for a few years), whilst the rosettes themselves grow at the end of runners (horizontal, long stolons).

The flowering stems have reduced and scattered leaves which terminate in a somewhat elongated cluster. The flowers are white, approximately 1 cm across and have dots which are either purplish or red. It flowers from mid-to-late June to early August, and produces perfect flowers (as it has both stamens and carpels). The flowers themselves have five petals, two styles, one inferior ovary and a two-beaked seed capsule. Warming (1909) noted that the flowers are protandrous, in the sense that even before the stigmas become receptive the flowers make and disperse pollen. However, as discussed in the 'Ecology' section below, the plant can self-pollinate.

Saxifraga paniculata can sometimes be mistaken for another plant in the same genus, Saxifraga tricuspidata (prickly saxifrage); whilst S. tricuspidata does grow in a similar range, it can be differentiated from S. paniculata by its lack of lime-encrusted pores and by its crowded and much narrower leaves, which apart from three terminating stiff spine-tipped teeth have otherwise smooth margins.

== Distribution and habitat ==
Growing in the Circumboreal Region, Saxifraga paniculata can be found throughout Central Europe, Greenland, Iceland and Scandinavia, as well as in the Caucasus and in North America where it can be found in the northern Great Lakes region, New England and New York State. Only historical records document it in Maine, whilst it is present, though considered a rarity, in Vermont, Nova Scotia, Newfoundland Island, New Brunswick, Minnesota and Labrador.

Saxifraga paniculata is a calciphile, and hence is found in calcareous habitats: an example of which is in a crevice of a basic rock (including basalt and volcanic rock conglomerates). Of the rock crevices or rock ledges it does grow on, S. paniculata prefers the shady ones.

== Ecology ==
Its ability to close its leaf rosettes when undergoing deleterious environmental conditions such as excessive heat and droughts gives Saxifraga paniculata a very high resistance to sustained photoinhibition and irreversible dehydration; a paper published by Hacker and Neuner in 2006 found that S. paniculata was more resistant to cold induced photoinhibition in winter than any other evergreen subalpine species that the group had studied. Due to the short growing season and the possible lack of pollinators, S. paniculata (like many arctic plants) can self-pollinate - whilst usually avoided in plant species as there is no potential for genetic variation in offspring, it does still ensure in dire conditions that seed is produced and dispersed.

In the wild, Saxifraga paniculata has been observed with many associated species, including but not limited to: Trisetum spicatum, Polygonum viviparum, Polypodium virginianum, Sagina nodosa, Woodsia alpina, Campanula rotundifolia, Rubus pubescens, Aralia nudicaulis, Tortella tortuosa, Aquilegia canadensis, Carex eburnea and Woodsia glabella, as well as lichen cover.

== Cultivation ==
Saxifraga paniculata is cultivated as an ornamental garden plant. Though hardy, it dislikes winter wetness and requires very sharp drainage in an alkaline or neutral soil. It is therefore often to be found in a rock garden or alpine house. It has given rise to numerous hybrids and cultivars. The following have gained the Royal Horticultural Society's Award of Garden Merit:-

- 'Lavagreana'
- 'Rosea'
- 'Venetia'
