= List of flora of Washington =

This is a partial list of flora that are native to the U.S. state of Washington.

== Plants sorted by family ==
=== Adoxaceae ===
- Sambucus nigra ― blue elderberry
- Sambucus racemosa ― red elderberry
- Viburnum edule ― high-bush cranberry
- Viburnum ellipticum ― common viburnum
- Viburnum opulus ― snowball viburnum

=== Asparagaceae ===
- Asparagus officinalis ― garden asparagus
- Brodiaea coronaria ― bluedick brodiea
- Camassia quamash ― common camas
- Camassia leichtlinii ― large camas
- Dichelostemma congestum ― ookow, northern saitas
- Maianthemum dilatatum ― false lily-of-the-valley
- Maianthemum racemosum ― feathery false lily-of-the-valley
- Maianthemum stellatum ― starry false lily-of-the-valley
- Muscari armeniacum ― garden grape-hyacinth
- Ornithogalum umbellatum ― sleepydick
- Triteleia grandiflora ― blue umber lily
- Triteleia hyacinthina ― white triteleia

=== Athyriaceae ===
- Athyrium filix-femina — common lady fern

=== Berberidaceae ===
- Achlys californica — vanillaleaf
- Achlys triphylla — vanillaleaf
- Berberis nervosa — dwarf Oregon-grape
- Mahonia aquifolium — Oregon-grape
- Vancouveria hexandra — white inside-out flower

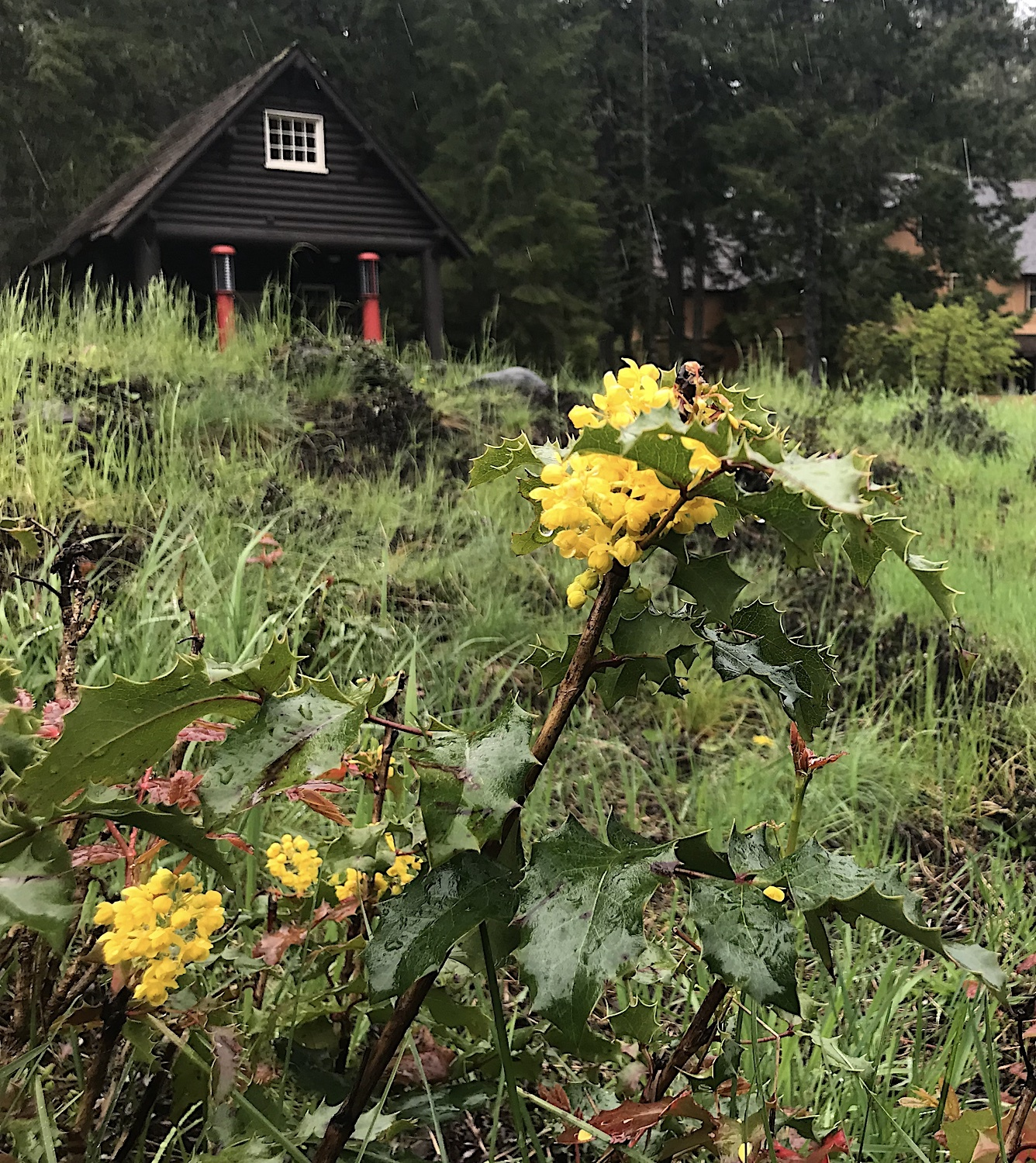
Holly-leaf Oregon-grape at Longmire, Mount Rainier National Park

=== Betulaceae ===
- Alnus incana — mountain alder
- Alnus rhombifolia — white alder
- Alnus rubra — red alder
- Alnus viridis — Siberian alder, Sitka alder, mountain alder
- Betula glandulosa — swamp birch
- Betula occidentalis — water birch, river birch
- Betula papyrifera — paper birch
- Betula pumila — bog birch, dwarf birch
- Corylus cornuta — California hazel, beaked hazel

=== Blechnaceae ===
- Blechnum spicant — deer fern

=== Boraginaceae ===
- Hydrophyllum tenuipes — Pacific waterleaf

=== Caprifoliaceae ===
- Symphoricarpos albus — snowberry, waxberry

=== Cannabaceae ===
- Celtis reticulata — western hackberry/netleaf hackberry

=== Cornaceae ===
- Cornus nuttallii — Pacific dogwood
- Cornus sericea — creek dogwood
- Cornus × unalaschkensis — western bunchberry

=== Cupressaceae ===
- Cupressus nootkatensis — Nootka cypress
- Juniperus communis — common juniper
- Juniperus maritima — seaside juniper
- Juniperus occidentalis — western juniper
- Juniperus scopulorum — Rocky Mountain juniper
- Thuja plicata — western redcedar

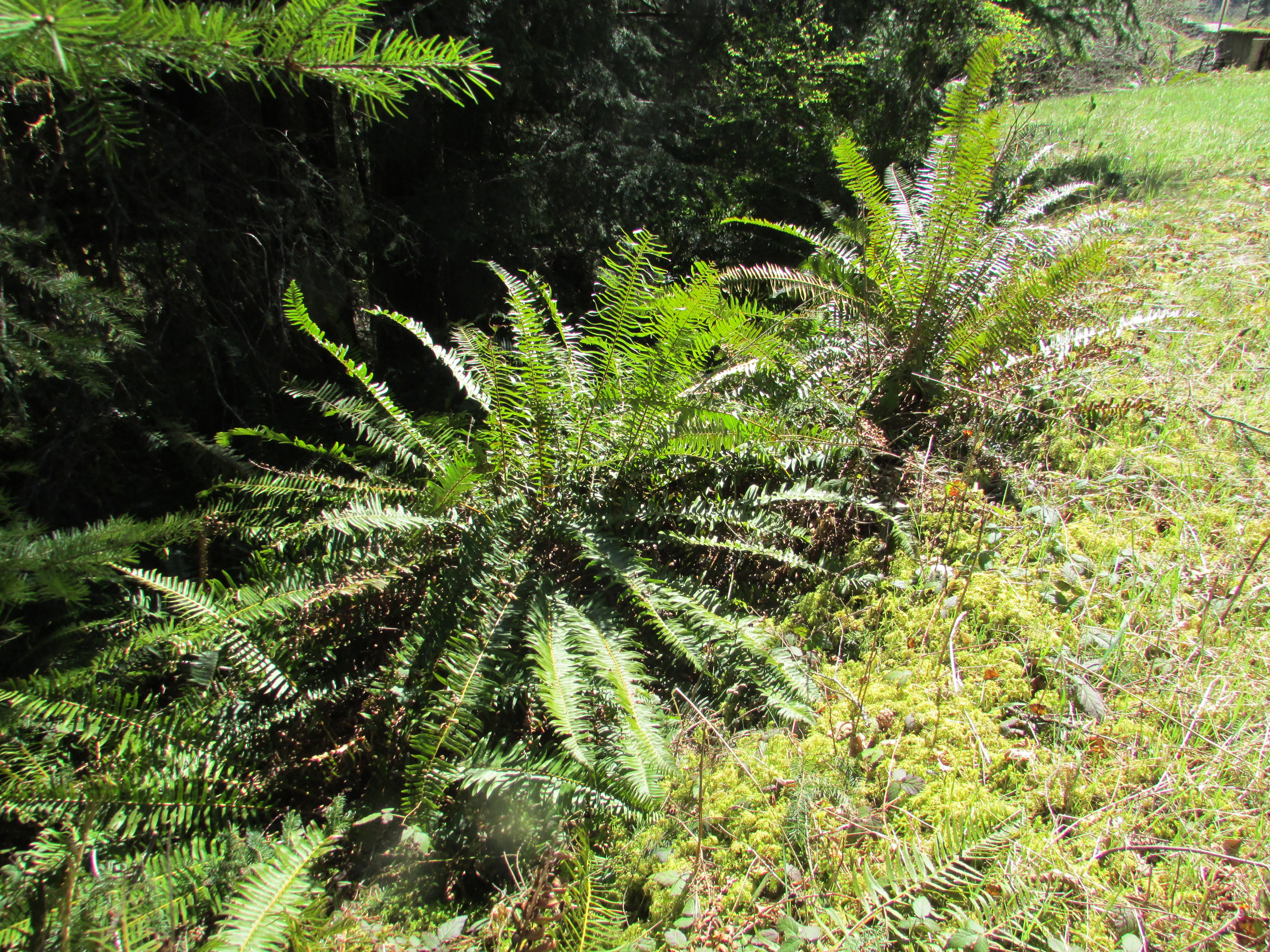
Sword fern along the Carbon River Road on the slopes of Mt. Rainier.

=== Cyperaceae ===
- Schoenoplectus acutus — tule

=== Dryopteridaceae ===
- Polystichum munitum — western sword fern

=== Ericaceae ===
- Arbutus menziesii — Pacific madrona
- Arctostaphylos uva-ursi — kinnickinnick
- Gaultheria shallon — salal
- Rhododendron macrophyllum — Pacific rhododendron
- Vaccinium ovatum — evergreen huckleberry
- Vaccinium parvifolium — red huckleberry

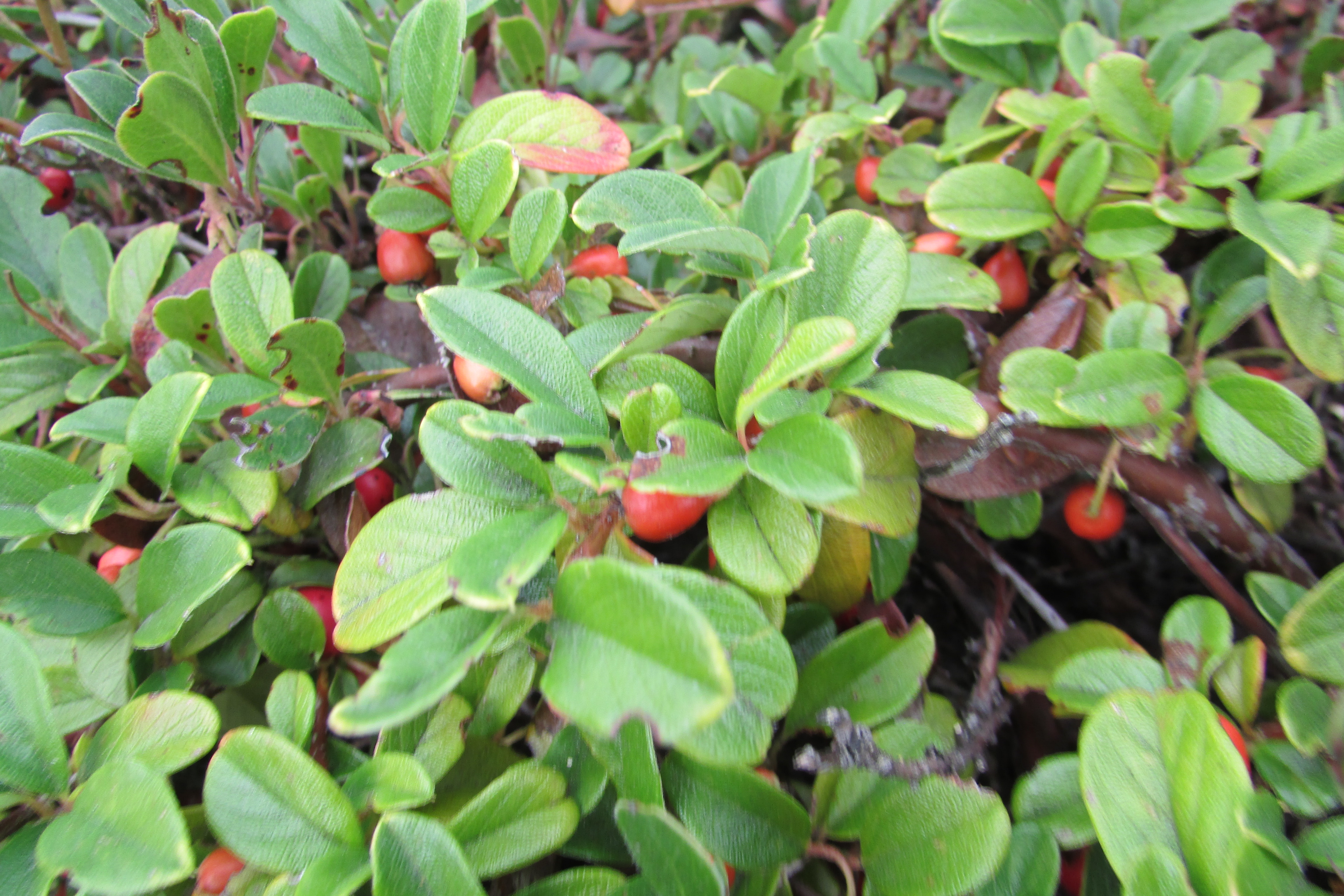
Kinnikinnick or Bear berry in Bonney Lake, Washington.

=== Fagaceae ===
- Chrysolepis chrysophylla — golden chinquapin
- Quercus garryana — Oregon white oak

=== Hydrangeaceae ===
- Philadelphus lewisii — Lewis's mock-orange

=== Liliaceae ===
- Clintonia uniflora ― bead lily, queen's cup
- Erythronium grandiflorum ― yellow glacier lily
- Erythronium oregonum ― white fawn lily
- Erythronium revolutum — pink fawn lily

=== Oleaceae ===
- Fraxinus latifolia — Oregon ash

=== Orchidaceae ===
- Goodyera oblongifolia — rattlesnake plantain
- Cephalanthera austiniae — phantom orchid
- Calypso bulbosa — fairy-slipper
- Corallorhiza maculata — spotted coralroot
- Corallorhiza mertensiana — pacific coralroot
- Corallorhiza striata — striped coralroot
- Platanthera stricta — slender bog orchid
- Platanthera dilatata — white bog orchid
- Spiranthes romanzoffiana — hooded ladies tresses
- Neottia cordata — heartleaf twayblade
- Neottia banksiana — northwestern twayblade
- Cypripedium montanum — mountain ladies slipper
- Platanthera elegans — elegant rein orchid
- Platanthera unalascensis — alaska rein orchid
- Platanthera elongata — denseflower rein orchid
- Platanthera transversa — flat spurred piperia
- Platanthera ephemerantha — whiteflower rein orchid
- Platanthera orbiculata — round leaved bog orchid
- Epipactis gigantea — stream orchid

=== Paeoniaceae ===
- Paeonia brownii — native peony

=== Papaveraceae ===
- Dicentra formosa — Pacific bleeding heart

=== Pinaceae ===
- Abies amabilis — Pacific silver fir
- Abies grandis — grand fir
- Abies lasiocarpa — subalpine fir
- Abies procera — noble fir
- Larix lyallii — alpine larch
- Larix occidentalis — western larch
- Picea engelmannii — Engelmann spruce
- Picea glauca — white spruce, western white spruce
- Picea sitchensis — Sitka spruce
- Pinus albicaulis — whitebark pine
- Pinus contorta — lodgepole pine
- Pinus monticola — western white pine
- Pinus ponderosa — ponderosa pine
- Pseudotsuga menziesii — Douglas fir
- Tsuga heterophylla — western hemlock
- Tsuga mertensiana — mountain hemlock

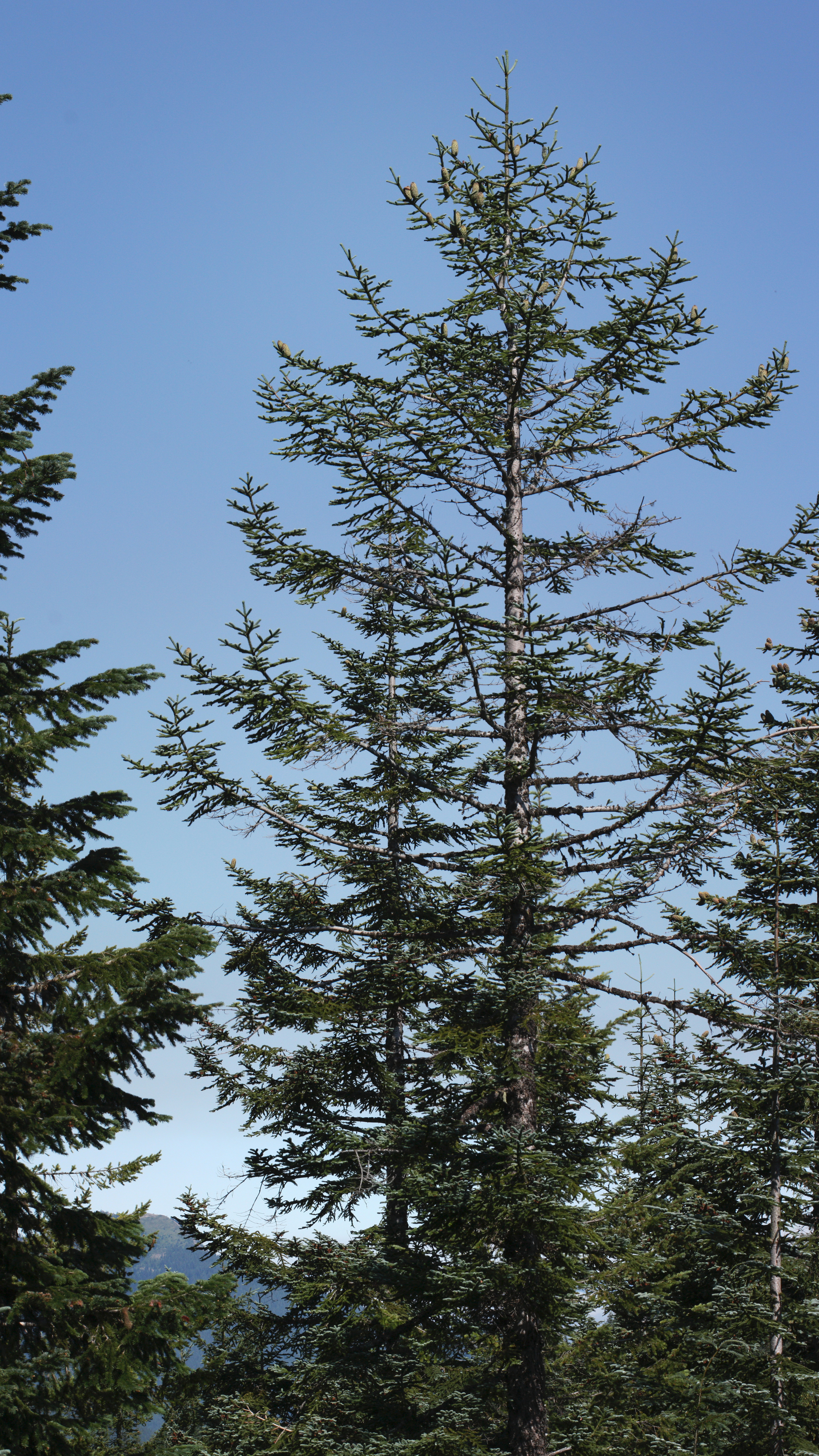
Noble fir on Juniper Ridge Trail 261, Gifford Pinchot National Forest.

=== Plantaginaceae ===
- Penstemon acuminatus — sharpleaf penstemon
- Penstemon barrettiae — Barrett's beardtongue
- Penstemon cardwellii — T.J. Howell Cardwell's beardtongue
- Penstemon palmeri — Palmer's penstemon
- Penstemon rupicola — cliff beardtongue

=== Polypodiaceae ===
- Polypodium glycyrrhiza — licorice fern

=== Ranunculaceae ===
- Actaea rubra ― baneberry
- Anemone deltoidea ― three-leaved anemone, Pacific white anemone, Columbian windflower
- Anemone multifida ― cut-leaf anemone
- Aquilegia formosa ― red columbine
- Caltha biflora ― two-flowered marsh marigold
- Caltha leptosepala ― white marsh marigold
- Coptis asplenifolia ― fern-leaved goldthread
- Delphinium menziesii ― Menzie's larkspur
- Pulsatilla occidentalis, syn. Anemone occidentalis ― western anemone, white pasqueflower
- Ranunculus eschscholtzii ― Eschscholtz's buttercup
- Ranunculus flammula ― lesser spearwort, creeping spearwort, banewort
- Ranunculus occidentalis ― western buttercup
- Ranunculus uncinatus ― little buttercup
- Thalictrum occidentale ― western meadowrue
- Trautvetteria caroliniensis ― false bugbane
- Trollius laxus ― globeflower

=== Rhamnaceae ===
- Rhamnus purshiana — cascara buckthorn

=== Rosaceae ===
- Amelanchier alnifolia ― saskatoon, Pacific serviceberry
- Aruncus dioicus — goat's beard
- Geum calthifolium ― caltha-leaved avens
- Geum macrophyllum ― large-leaved avens
- Leutkea pectinata ― partridgefoot
- Oemleria cerasiformis — osoberry
- Physocarpus capitatus — Pacific ninebark
- Potentilla anserina ― silverweed
- Potentilla flabellifolia ― fan-leaved cinquefoil
- Potentilla villosa ― villous cinquefoil
- Rosa nutkana — Nootka rose
- Rubus parviflorus — thimbleberry
- Rubus spectabilis — salmonberry
- Rubus ursinus — trailing blackberry, California dewberry
- Sanguisorba canadensis ― Sitka burnet
- Sanguisorba officinalis ― great burnet
- Sibbaldia procumbens ― sibbaldia

=== Salicaceae ===
- Populus tremuloides — quaking aspen
- Populus trichocarpa — black cottonwood
- Salix amygdaloides — peach-leaf willow
- Salix arctica — Arctic willow
- Salix barclayi — Barclay's willow
- Salix bebbiana — gray willow, Bebb's willow, long-beak willow
- Salix boothii — Booth's willow
- Salix brachycarpa — small-fruit willow
- Salix candida — sage willow
- Salix cascadensis — Cascade willow
- Salix columbiana — Columbia River willow
- Salix commutata — under-green willow
- Salix drummondiana — Drummond's willow
- Salix eastwoodiae — Sierra willow
- Salix exigua — narrow-leaf willow, coyote willow
- Salix farriae — Farr's willow
- Salix fragilis — crack willow
- Salix geyeriana — Geyer's willow
- Salix glauca — gray willow
- Salix hookeriana — coastal willow
- Salix lasiandra — Pacific willow
- Salix lasiolepis — arroyo willow
- Salix maccalliana — Maccalla's willow
- Salix melanopsis — dusky willow
- Salix monochroma — one-color willow
- Salix nivalis — dwarf snow willow
- Salix pedicellaris — bog willow
- Salix petrophila — alpine willow
- Salix planifolia — tea-leaved willow
- Salix prolixa — Mackenzie's willow
- Salix pseudomonticola — false mountain willow
- Salix scouleriana — Scouler's willow
- Salix sessilifolia — sessile-leaf willow
- Salix sitchensis — Sitka willow
- Salix tweedyi — Tweedy's willow
- Salix vestita — rock willow

=== Sapindaceae ===
- Acer circinatum — vine maple
- Acer glabrum — Douglas maple
- Acer macrophyllum — big-leaf maple

=== Saxifragaceae ===
- Boykinia occidentalis ― coast boykinia, western boykinia
- Chrysosplenium glechomifolium ― Pacific golden saxifrage
- Heuchera glabra ― smooth alumroot
- Heuchera micrantha ― small-flowered alumroot
- Leptarrhena pyrolifolia ― leatherleaf saxifrage
- Lithophragma parviflorum ― small-flowered woodland star
- Micranthes ferruginea ― Alaska saxifrage
- Micranthes occidentalis ― western saxifrage
- Micranthes tolmiei ― Tolmie's saxifrage
- Mitella breweri ― brewer's mitrewort
- Mitella pentandra ― five-stamened mitrewort
- Saxifraga bronchialis ― spotted saxifrage, prickly saxifrage
- Saxifraga cespitosa ― tufted saxifrage
- Saxifraga oppositifolia ― purple mountain saxifrage
- Tellima grandiflora ― fringecup
- Tiarella trifoliata ― foamflower
- Tolmiea menziesii ― piggy-back plant, youth-on-age

=== Taxaceae ===
- Taxus brevifolia — Pacific yew

=== Tofieldiaceae ===
- Triantha occidentalis — western false asphodel

=== Zosteraceae ===
- Zostera marina — marine eelgrass

== See also ==
- List of fauna of Washington (state)
