= Lester Island =

Island in Hooner-Angoon, Alaska

- Lester Island, Alaska
- Interactive map of Lester Island

Geography
- Coordinates: 58.468°N 135.905°W

Administration
- United States
- State: Alaska

Lester Island is an island located in the state of Alaska in the unorganized borough of Hoonah-Angoon within Glacier Bay National Park. It is the southern-most of the Beardslee Islands in the southeastern panhandle of the state.

== Location ==
Lester Island is located on the west side of Bartlett Cove and the Bartlett River, east of Young Island. The Glacier Bay park office and lodge is located on the east shore of the mainland across from the island and is 10 miles by road from Gustavus.

== History ==
A salmon processing plant was built on the island in 1883. In 1942 the United States Coast and Geodetic Survey (USC&GS) named the island after Rear Admiral Lester Beardslee, (1836-1903) the commander of the USS Jamestown that surveyed Alaskan coves and harbors from 1879 to 1880.

== Flora and fauna ==
=== Flora ===
Several species of seaweed or kelp, such as Nereocystis luetkeana, Alaria esculenta, and Laminaria grow on the rocks and in the water around the island. There is also Cochlearia officinalis (scurvy weed), Heracleum lanatum (cow parsnip), Honckenya peploides (beach greens), Leymus mollis (dunegrass) Lupinus nootkatensis (lupine) Mertensia maritima (Oysterleaf) Mimulus guttatus (monkeyflower) Plantago maritima (goose-tongue) Potentilla villosa (cinquefoil) Salicornia virginica (beach asparagus) and Senecio pseudoarnica (seashore sunflower)

Trees include Sitka spruce, alder, and hemlock. In 1977 an infestation of spruce beetle was discovered in southeast Alaska that spread to Lester Island and on the mainland east to Bartlett Lake area. Fomitopsis pinicola was found in some trees that were killed.

=== Fauna ===
Harbor seals (Phoca vitulina richardsi) and Steller sea lions (Eumetopias jubatus) are in the surrounding waters that also includes walleye, pollock, capelin, Pacific sand lance, herring, and salmon. There are also humpback whale (Megaptera novaeangliae), killer whale, harbor porpoise (Phocoena phocoena), and sea otters (Enhydra lutris) in the area.
