= List of reptiles of Washington =

This is a list of reptiles found in the US state of Washington.

== Lizards ==
=== Desert lizards (family Phrynosomatidae) ===
Common name	Scientific name	Conservation status	Description	Photograph
Pygmy short-horned lizard	Phrynosoma douglasii	Not evaluated	Maximum size is approximately 65 millimetres (2.6 in).	
Sagebrush lizard	Sceloporus graciosus	Least concern	Adults reach up to 60 millimetres (2.4 in)	
Side-blotched lizard	Uta stansburiana	Least concern	Adults reach 55 millimetres (2.2 in).	
Western fence lizard	Sceloporus occidentalis	Least concern	Adults approximately 5.6–8.7 centimetres (2.2–3.4 in)	

=== Skinks (family Scincidae) ===
Common name	Scientific name	Conservation status	Description	Photograph
Western skink	Eumeces skiltonianus	Least concern	Adults are approximately 5.4–8.6 centimetres (2.1–3.4 in).	

=== Alligator lizards (family Anguidae) ===
Common name	Scientific name	Conservation status	Description	Photograph
Northern alligator lizard	Elgaria coerulea	Least concern	Maximum size is 100 millimetres (3.9 in).	
Southern alligator lizard	Elgaria multicarinata	Least concern	Adults are approximately 141 millimetres (5.6 in).	

== Snakes ==
=== Colubrids (family Colubridae) ===
Common name	Scientific name	Conservation status	Description	Photograph
California mountain kingsnake	Lampropeltis zonata	Least concern	Nonvenomous; adults reach 50–100 centimetres (20–39 in).	
Common garter snake	Thamnophis sirtalis	Least concern	Nonvenomous; adults reach up to 137.2 centimetres (54.0 in)	
Bull snake (Great Basin gopher snake)	Pituophis catenifer deserticola	Least concern	Nonvenomous, but can be aggressive; adults reach 180 centimetres (71 in).	
Gopher snake (Pacific gopher snake)	Pituophis catenifer catenifer	Not evaluated		
Night snake	Hypsiglena torquata	Least concern	Mildy venomous; adults usually less than 46 centimetres (18 in)	
Northwestern garter snake	Thamnophis ordinoides	Least concern	Nonvenomous; adults rarely exceed 60 centimetres (24 in)	
Racer	Coluber constrictor	Least concern	Nonvenomous; adults reach 50–152 centimetres (20–60 in)	
Ringneck snake	Diadophis punctatus	Least concern	Mildly venomous; adults rarely exceed 55 centimetres (22 in)	
Sharptail snake	Contia tenuis	Least concern	Nonvenomous; adults usually less than 30 centimetres (12 in)	
Striped whipsnake	Masticophis taeniatus	Least concern	Nonvenomous; adults reach 90–180 centimetres (35–71 in)	
Western terrestrial garter snake	Thamnophis elegans	Least concern	Nonvenomous; adults reach 97 centimetres (38 in)	

=== Vipers (family Viperidae) ===
Common name	Scientific name	Conservation status	Description	Photograph
Western rattlesnake	Crotalus oreganus	Least concern	Venomous; adults reach 60–150 centimetres (24–59 in)	

=== Boas (family Boidae) ===
Common name	Scientific name	Conservation status	Description	Photograph
Rubber boa	Charina bottae	Least concern	Nonvenomous; adults rarely exceed 60 centimetres (24 in) in the Pacific Northwest	

== Turtles ==
=== Pond turtles (family Emydidae) ===
Common name	Scientific name	Conservation status	Description	Photograph
Painted turtle	Chrysemys picta	Least concern	Adults are 6–25 centimetres (2.4–9.8 in).	
Pond slider	Trachemys scripta	Least concern	Non-native species. Adults are approximately 8.9–36.8 centimetres (3.5–14.5 in).	
Western pond turtle	Actinemys marmorata or Emys marmorata	Vulnerable	Adults are approximately 9–19 centimetres (3.5–7.5 in) carapace length.	

=== Sea turtles (family Cheloniidae) ===
Common name	Scientific name	Conservation status	Description	Photograph
Green turtle	Chelonia mydas	Least concern	Adults are 78–112 cm (31–44 in)	
Loggerhead sea turtle	Caretta caretta	Vulnerable	Adults are 90 cm (35 in)	
Olive ridley sea turtle	Lepidochelys olivacea	Vulnerable	Adults are about 61 cm (2 ft)	

=== Leatherback turtles (family Dermochelyidae) ===
Common name	Scientific name	Conservation status	Description	Photograph
Leatherback sea turtle	Dermochelys coriacea	Vulnerable	Adults can grow up to 2.7 metres (8 ft 10 in)	

=== Softshell turtles (family Trionychidae) ===
Common name	Scientific name	Conservation status	Description	Photograph
Spiny softshell	Apalone spinifera	Least concern	Non-native species. Adults are 18 to 54 cm (7.1–21.3 in).	

== See also ==
- List of fauna of Washington
