= Anemonastrum villosissimum =

Scientific classification
- Kingdom: Plantae
- Clade: Tracheophytes
- Clade: Angiosperms
- Clade: Eudicots
- Order: Ranunculales
- Family: Ranunculaceae
- Genus: Anemonastrum
- Species: A. villosissimum

Binomial name
- Anemonastrum villosissimum (DC.) Holub

Species of plant

Anemonastrum villosissimum (Japanese: センカソウ, romanized: senkasou, Russian: Ветреник мохнатейший, romanized: Vetrenik moxnateyshiy) is a species of plant in the genus Anemonastrum, native to the Kuril Islands, Aleutian Islands, and, to a lesser extent, southern Kamchatka.

== Description ==
Anemonastrum villosissimum reaches a height of around 5 to 6 inches. Both its stems and its pedate leaves are villose, and it produces flowering stems which end in terminal clusters of 6-petaled, white flowers about 3/4 of an inch wide. The plant blooms mostly around June-July.

== Range ==
Anemonastrum villosissimum is native to the Kuril Islands, Aleutian Islands, and the southern Kamchatka Peninsula.

== Habitat ==
Anemonastrum villosissimum grows in open areas such as hillsides and fields in full sun, where it does not have to compete for sunlight.

== Etymology ==
The specific epithet "villosissimum" refers to the plant's villose leaves and stems.
