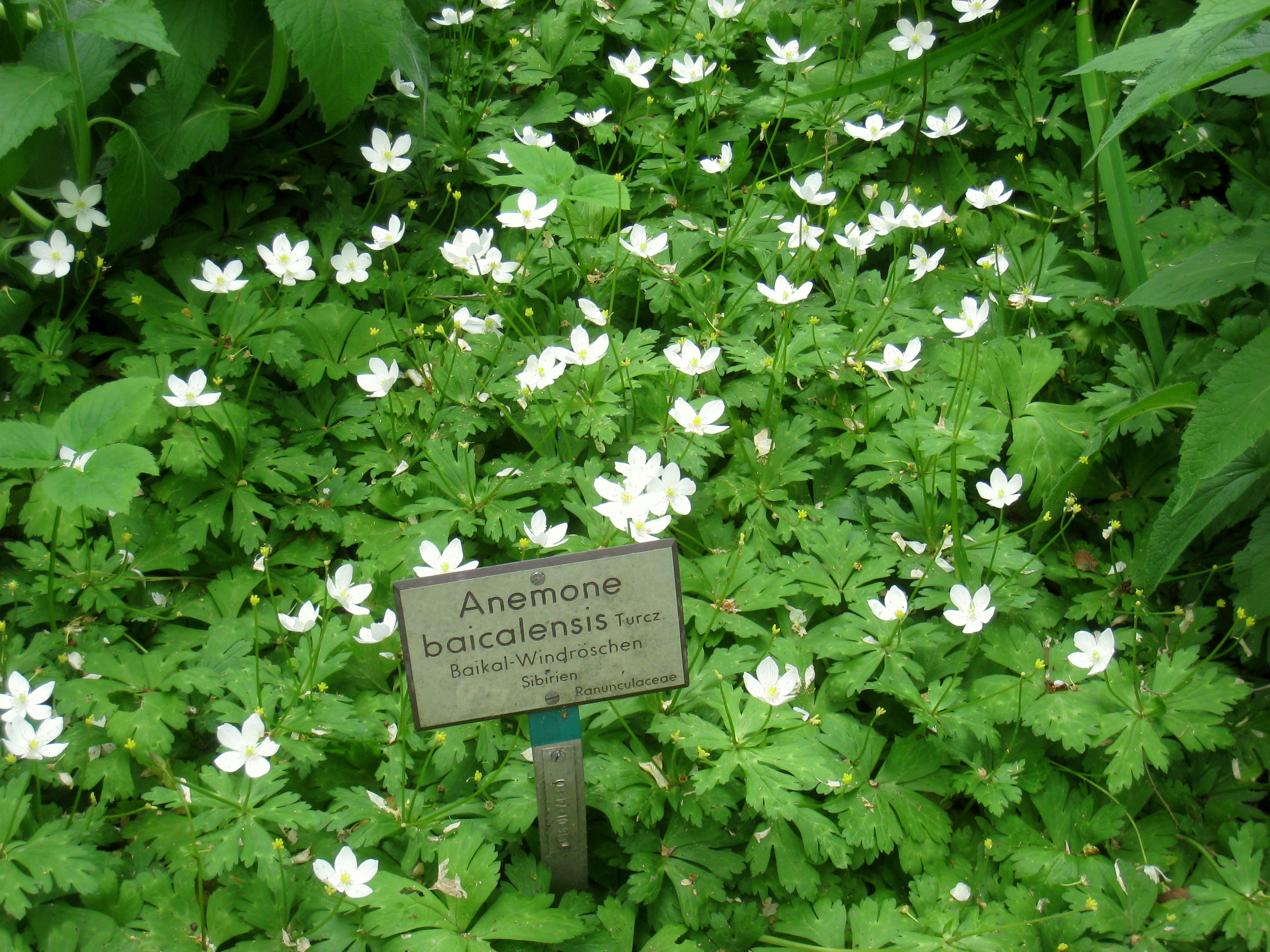

Scientific classification
- Kingdom: Plantae
- Clade: Tracheophytes
- Clade: Angiosperms
- Clade: Eudicots
- Order: Ranunculales
- Family: Ranunculaceae
- Genus: Anemonastrum
- Species: A. baicalense

Binomial name
- Anemonastrum baicalense (Turcz.) Mosyakin

= Anemonastrum baicalense =

Species of plant

Anemonastrum baicalense is a species of flowering plant in the genus Anemonastrum. It is native to forests, scrub, and grassy places at 500–3100 m. altitude in Siberia, Mongolia, northern China, and North Korea in Northeast Asia.
