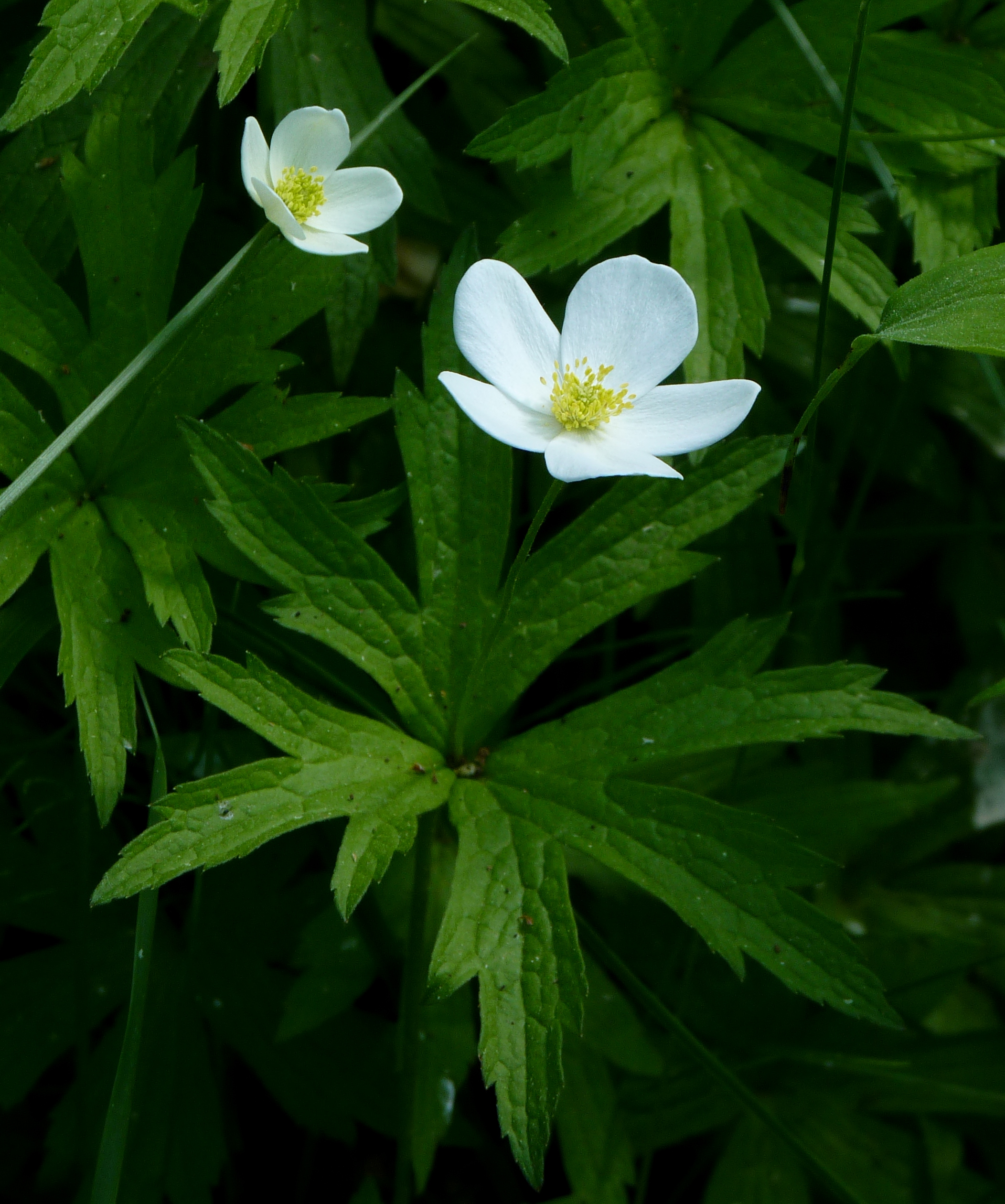

Scientific classification
- Kingdom: Plantae
- Clade: Embryophytes
- Clade: Tracheophytes
- Clade: Spermatophytes
- Clade: Angiosperms
- Clade: Eudicots
- Order: Ranunculales
- Family: Ranunculaceae
- Genus: Anemonastrum
- Species: A. canadense

Binomial name
- Anemonastrum canadense (L.) Mosyakin

Synonyms
- Aiolon canadense (L.) Nieuwl. & Lunell; Aiolon canadense f. flavum Lunell; Anemone canadensis L.; Anemone dichotoma var. canadensis (L.) MacMill.; Anemonidium canadense (L.) Á.Löve & D.Löve; Nemorosa canadensis (L.) Nieuwl.; Nemorsoa canadensis (L.) Nieuwl.

= Anemonastrum canadense =

Species of flowering plant in the buttercup family

Anemonastrum canadense, synonym Anemone canadensis, the Canada anemone, round-headed anemone, round-leaf thimbleweed, meadow anemone, windflower, or crowfoot, is a herbaceous perennial flowering plant in the family Ranunculaceae. It is native to moist meadows, thickets, streambanks, and lakeshores in North America, spreading rapidly by underground rhizomes. It is valued for its white flowers.

== Description ==
The Canada anemone has shoots with deeply divided and toothed basal leaves on 8–22 cm (3 1/4–8 3/4 inches) petioles. They grow from ascending caudices on long, thin rhizomes. The shoots are 20–80 cm (8–31 inches) tall, and leaves are 4–10 cm (1 1/2–4 inches) by 5–15 cm (2–6 inches).

Flowers with about 5 white, petal-like sepals and 80-100 yellow stamens bloom from late spring to summer on stems above a cluster of leaves. The sepals are obovate (with the base slightly tapered) and 10–20 mm (1/2–3/4 inch) by 5–15 mm (1/4–5/8 inch).

When they are pollinated, the green pistils in the middle of the flower become a rounded to slightly lengthened seed head. The seeds are achenes, with an almost round body and a beak.

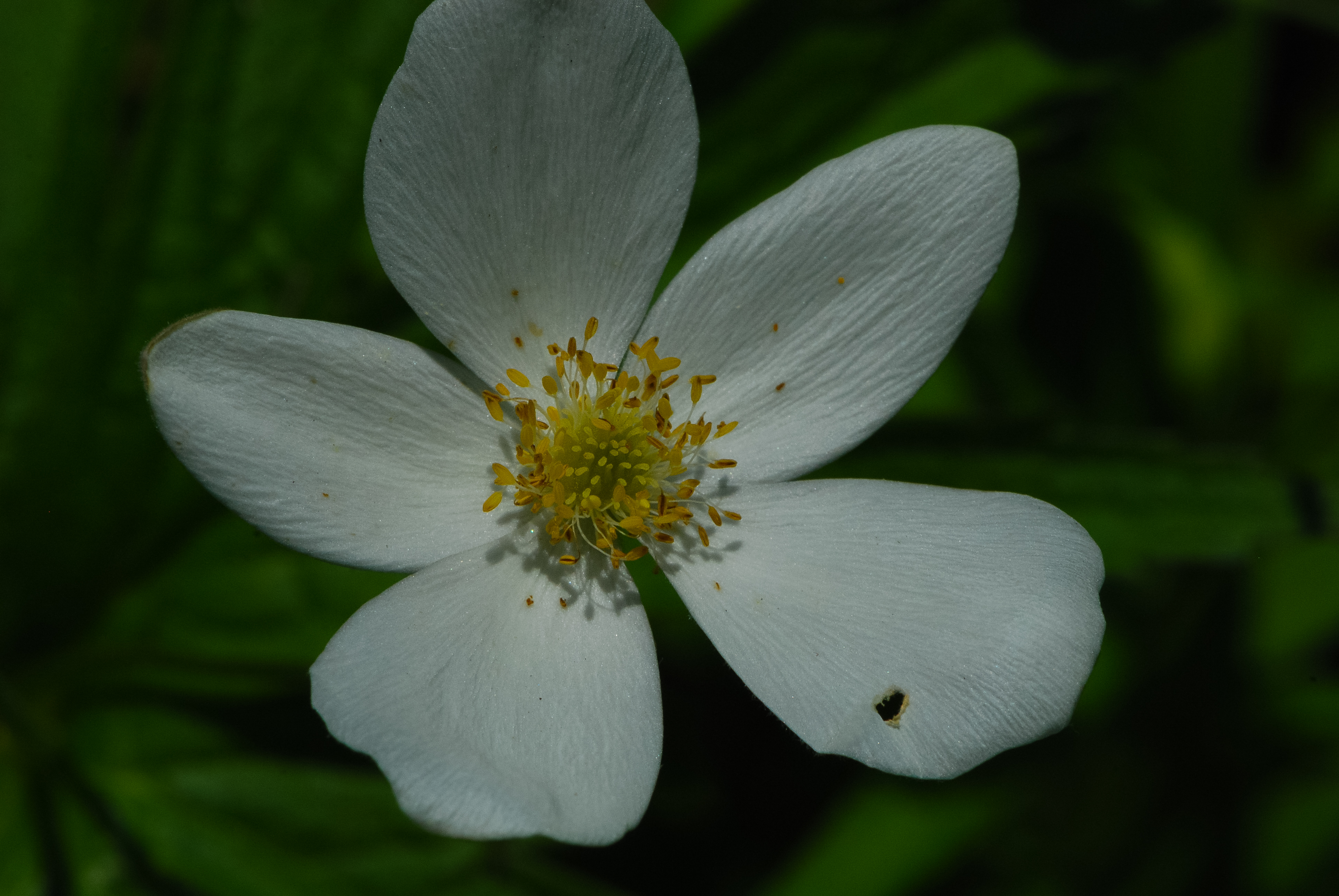
Close-up of a flower with light green pistils in the middle of fairly old stamens, and white sepals behind them

== Taxonomy ==
The species was first described in 1768 by Carl Linnaeus, as Anemone canadensis. As traditionally and broadly circumscribed, the genus Anemone has repeatedly been shown not to be monophyletic, with genera such as Clematis and Pulsatilla embedded within it. As part of creating monophyletic genera, Sergei Mosyakin expanded the genus Anemonastrum to include Anemone canadensis as Anemonastrum canadense.

== Distribution ==
Anemonastrum canadense is native to Canada and the west central and eastern United States.

== Uses ==
Anemonastrum canadense was used medically by North American Indigenous peoples as an astringent, as a styptic for wounds, sores, nosebleeds, and as an eyewash. The root was respected by Plains tribes and used for many ailments.

== Toxicity ==
It is likely that most anemones contain similar caustic irritants to other members of the family Ranunculaceae.
