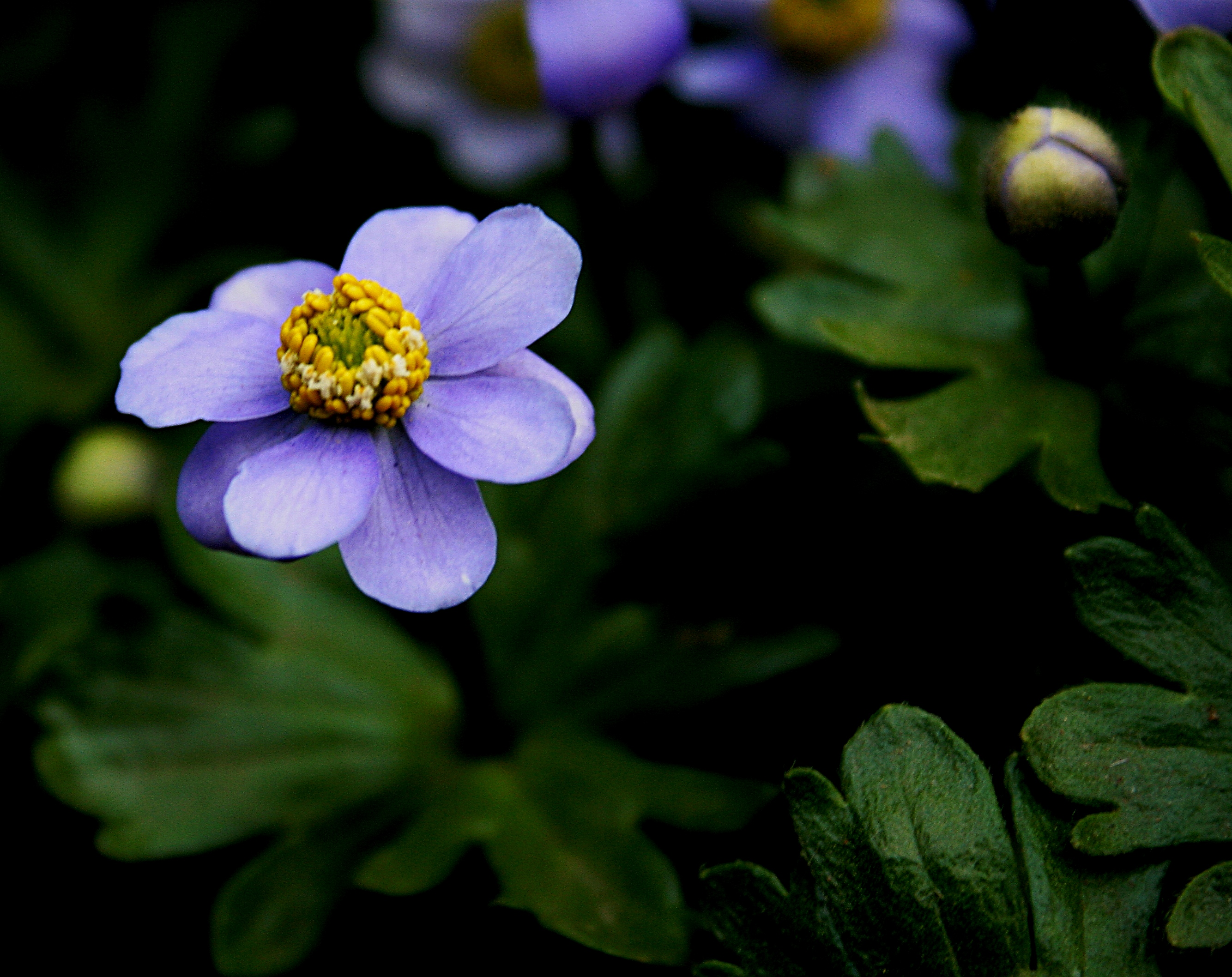

Scientific classification
- Kingdom: Plantae
- Clade: Tracheophytes
- Clade: Angiosperms
- Clade: Eudicots
- Order: Ranunculales
- Family: Ranunculaceae
- Genus: Anemonastrum
- Species: A. obtusilobum

Binomial name
- Anemonastrum obtusilobum (D.Don) Mosyakin

Synonyms
- List: Anemone discolor Royle; Anemone micrantha Klotzsch; Anemone mollis Wall.; Anemone multisepala Qureshi & Chaudhri; Anemone neelamiana Qureshi & Chaudhri; Anemone obtusiloba D.Don; Anemone obtusiloba var. leiocarpa M.N.Tamura; Anemonidium obtusilobum (D.Don) Christenh. & Byng; Pulsatilloides obtusiloba (D.Don) Starod.

= Anemonastrum obtusilobum =

Species of plant

Anemonastrum obtusilobum (syn. Anemone obtusiloba), the round-leaved anemone, is a species of flowering plant in the family Ranunculaceae, native to mountainous regions of Pakistan, Myanmar, Nepal and western China (Tibet), and also cultivated as an ornamental.

It is a low-growing, clump forming perennial plant to 15 cm (6 in), with rounded hairy leaves and variable flowers of white, blue or occasionally yellow. The flowers consist of 4-7 rounded petals surrounding a prominent yellow central boss, and appear in spring to early summer. The plant is reasonably hardy, but requires a sheltered spot in full sun or partial shade. It is suitable as an underplanting for deciduous trees or shrubs.

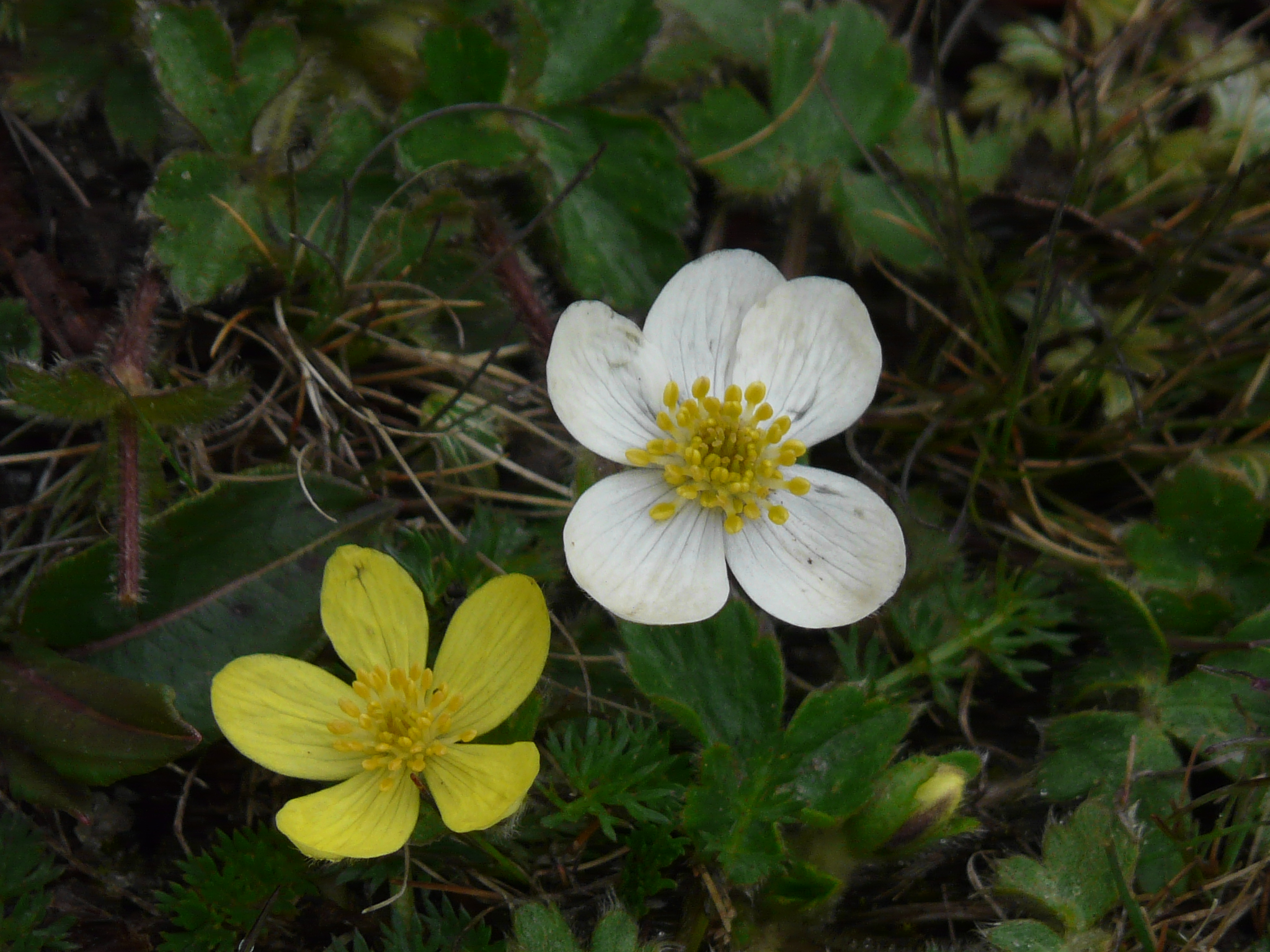

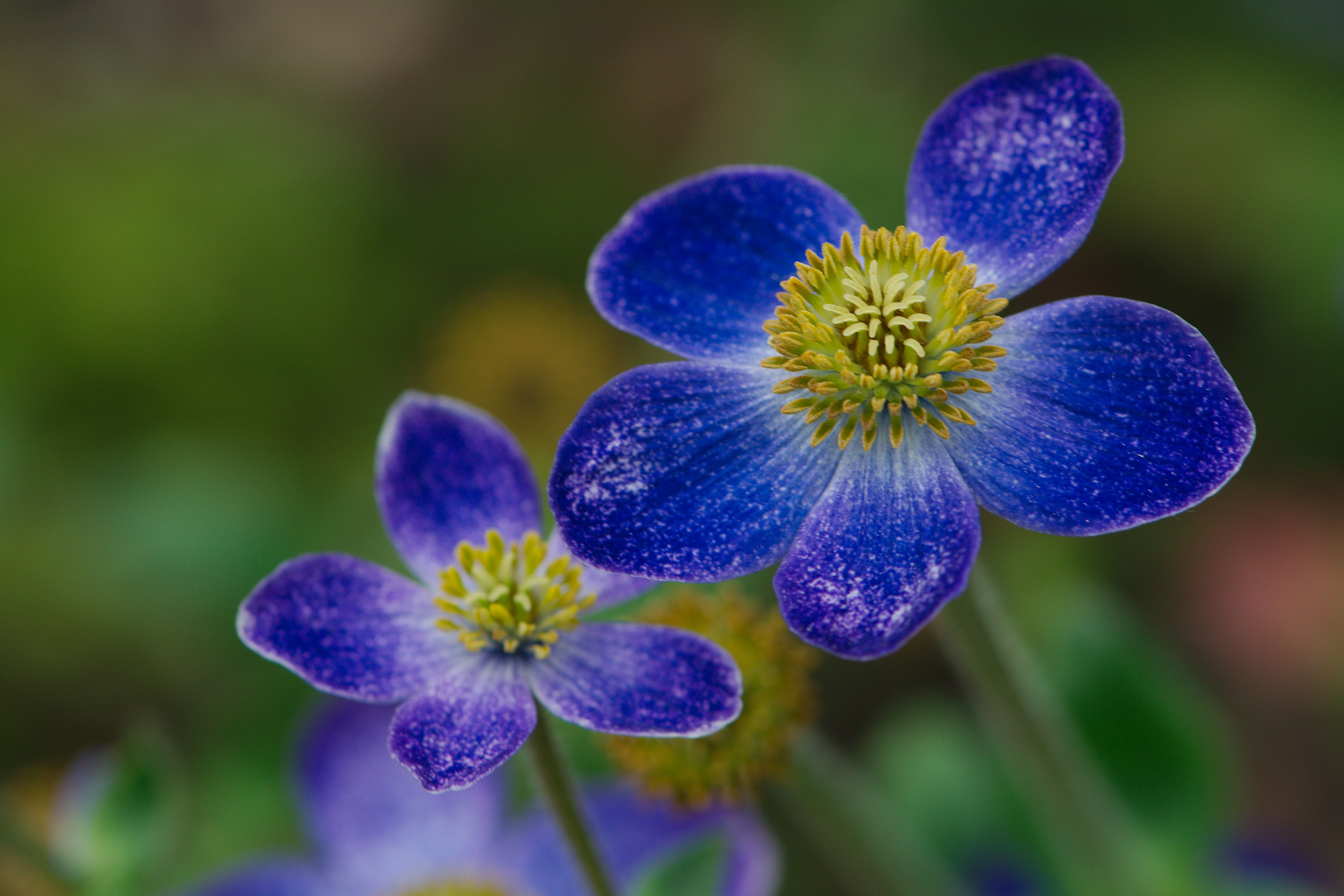
'Pradesh'
