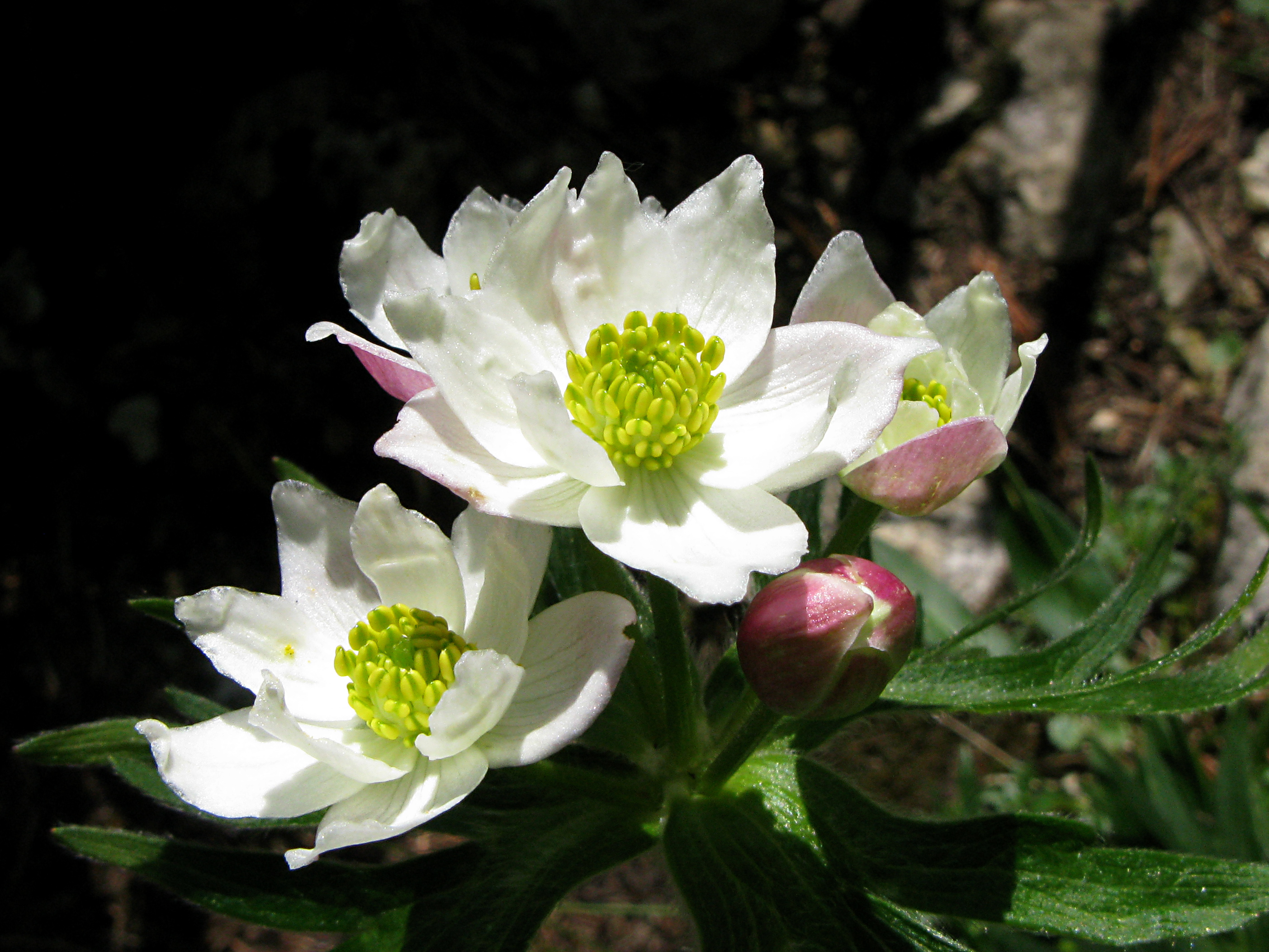

Scientific classification
- Kingdom: Plantae
- Clade: Tracheophytes
- Clade: Angiosperms
- Clade: Eudicots
- Order: Ranunculales
- Family: Ranunculaceae
- Genus: Anemonastrum
- Species: A. narcissiflorum

Binomial name
- Anemonastrum narcissiflorum (L.) Holub

= Anemonastrum narcissiflorum =

Species of flowering plant

Anemonastrum narcissiflorum, the narcissus anemone or narcissus-flowered anemone, is a herbaceous perennial in the genus Anemonastrum and the buttercup family. Basionym: Anemone narcissiflora Hook. & Arn.

== Description ==
Plants grow 7 to 60 cm (2 3/4 to 23 1/2 inches) tall, from a caudex (woody-like perennial base), flowering spring to mid summer but often found flowering till late summer. They have 3-10 basal leaves that are ternate (arranged with three leaflets), rounded to rounded triangular in shape with 4-to-20-millimetre (5/32-to-25/32-inch) long petioles.

The flowers are produced in clusters (umbels) with 2 to 8 flowers, but often appear singly. The inflorescence have 3 leaf-like bracts similar in appearance to the basal leaves but simple and greatly reduced in size, pinnatifid in shape. Flowers have no petals, but instead have 5-9 petal-like sepals that are white, blue-tinted white or yellow in color. The flowers usually have 40 to 80 stamens but can have up to 100.

After flowering, fruits are produced in rounded heads with 5–14-centimetre (2–5 1/2-inch) long pedicels. When the fruits, called achenes, are ripe they are ellipsoid to ovate in outline, flat in shape and 5 to 9 millimetres (3/16 to 11/32 in) long and 4–6 millimetres (5/32–1/4 in) wide. The achenes are winged with no hairs and have 0.8–1.5-millimetre (0.031–0.059-inch) long beaks that are curved or recurved.

== Distribution and habitat ==
Anemonastrum narcissiflorum is native to north western North America and Eurasia where it can be found growing in high mountain alpine grasslands, in thickets, grassy meadows with moist soils, tundra, open woods, along roadsides and in pastures.

== Varieties ==
This species is very variable and at least 12 varieties are generally recognized with even more proposed by other authorities. The name of the species has been in dispute and some have listed it as Anemone narcissifolia but Anemone narcissiflora was proposed for conservation.

Three varieties are native to North America:

- Anemone narcissiflora L. var. villosissima DC. - Alaska
- Anemone narcissiflora L. var. monantha DC. - Alaska and Eastern Yukon and Northern Northwest Territories in Canada
- Anemone narcissiflora L. var. zephyra (A. Nels.) Dutton & Keener – Colorado and Wyoming

The others are from Eurasia.

== Gallery ==
Flower on July 27, 2002 on Mount Tsubakuro	Leaf on August 5, 2007 on Mount Kita	Seed on August 16, 2007 on Mt. Kita	Natural garden on July 27, 2002 on Mt. Tsubakuro
