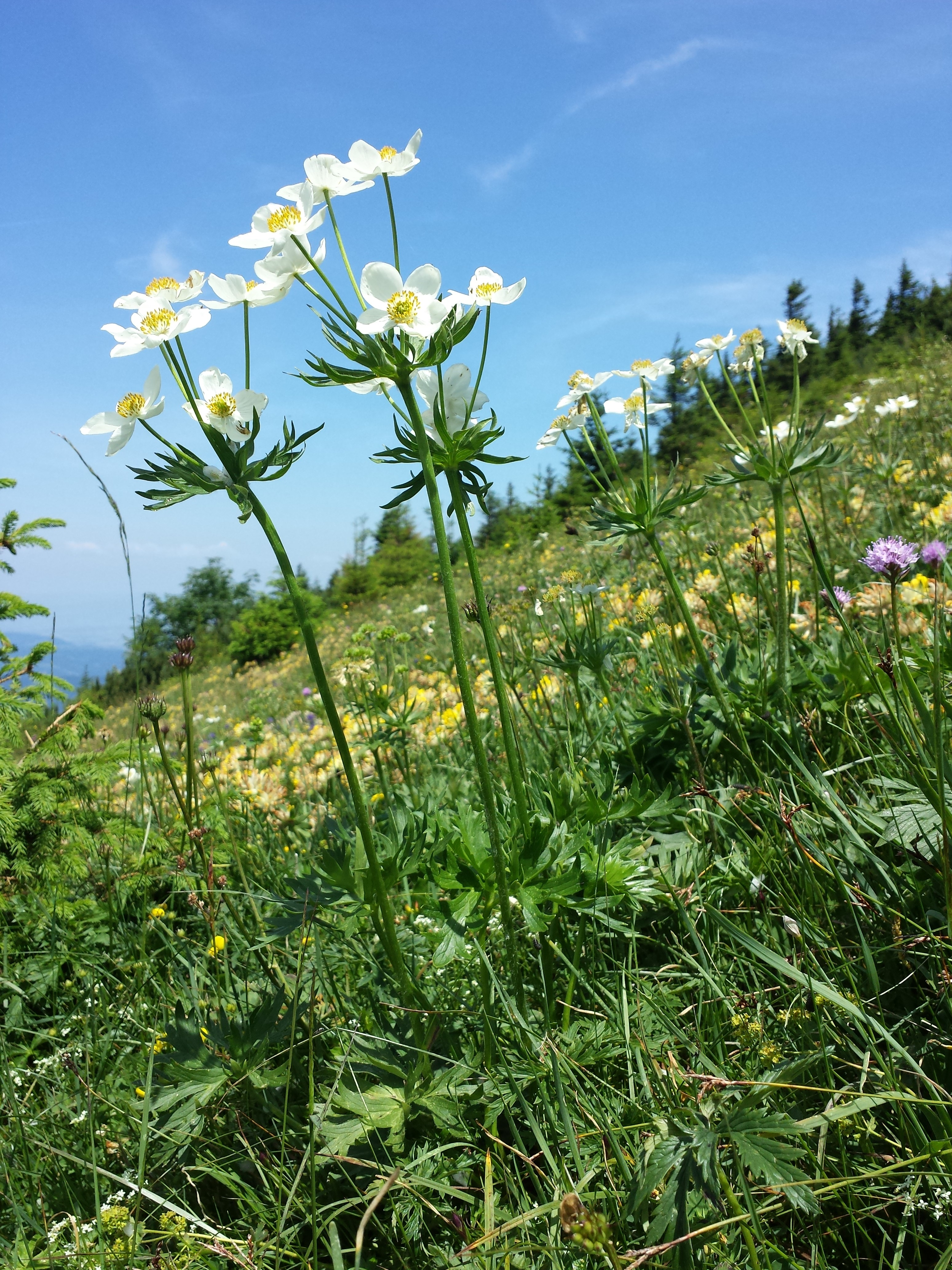
- Anemonastrum narcissiflorum

Scientific classification
- Kingdom: Plantae
- Clade: Embryophytes
- Clade: Tracheophytes
- Clade: Spermatophytes
- Clade: Angiosperms
- Clade: Eudicots
- Order: Ranunculales
- Family: Ranunculaceae
- Subfamily: Ranunculoideae
- Tribe: Anemoneae
- Genus: Anemonastrum; Holub

Species
- See text

Synonyms
- Anemonidium (Spach) Holub; Homalocarpus Schur; Jurtsevia Á.Löve & D.Löve

= Anemonastrum =

Genus of flowering plants

Anemonastrum is a genus of flowering plants in the family Ranunculaceae. Plants of the genus are native to the temperate and subarctic regions of North America, Greenland, Europe, Asia, South America, and New Zealand. The generic name Anemonastrum means "somewhat like anemone", a reference to the Anemone genus of closely related plants. It chiefly differs from Anemone in having a base chromosome number of x=7, as opposed to x=8.

== Species ==
As of August 2020, Kew's Plants of the World Online accepts 38 species in the genus Anemonastrum:

- Anemonastrum antucense (Poepp.) Mosyakin & de Lange
- Anemonastrum baicalense (Turcz.) Mosyakin
- Anemonastrum biarmiense (Juz.) Holub
- Anemonastrum calvum (Juz.) Holub
- Anemonastrum canadense (L.) Mosyakin
- Anemonastrum coelestinum (Franch.) Mosyakin
- Anemonastrum crinitum (Juz.) Holub
- Anemonastrum deltoideum (Douglas) Mosyakin
- Anemonastrum demissum (Hook.f. & Thomson) Holub
- Anemonastrum dichotomum (L.) Mosyakin
- Anemonastrum elongatum (D.Don) Holub
- Anemonastrum fasciculatum (L.) Holub
- Anemonastrum flaccidum (Fr.Schmidt) Mosyakin
- Anemonastrum geum (H.Lév.) Mosyakin
- Anemonastrum imbricatum (Maxim.) Holub
- Anemonastrum keiskeanum (T.Itô ex Maxim.) Mosyakin
- Anemonastrum narcissiflorum (L.) Holub
- Anemonastrum obtusilobum (D.Don) Mosyakin
- Anemonastrum patulum (C.C.Chang ex W.T.Wang) Mosyakin
- Anemonastrum polyanthes (D.Don) Holub
- Anemonastrum polycarpum (W.E.Evans) Mosyakin
- Anemonastrum prattii (Huth ex Ulbr.) Mosyakin
- Anemonastrum protractum (Ulbr.) Holub
- Anemonastrum richardsonii (Hook.) Mosyakin
- Anemonastrum rockii (Ulbr.) Mosyakin
- Anemonastrum rupestre (Wall. ex Hook.f. & Thomson) Mosyakin
- Anemonastrum sachalinense (Juz.) Starod.
- Anemonastrum shikokianum (Makino) Holub
- Anemonastrum sibiricum (L.) Holub
- Anemonastrum smithianum (Lauener & Panigrahi) Holub
- Anemonastrum subindivisum (W.T.Wang) Mosyakin
- Anemonastrum subpinnatum (W.T.Wang) Mosyakin
- Anemonastrum tenuicaule (Cheeseman) de Lange & Mosyakin
- Anemonastrum tetrasepalum (Royle) Holub
- Anemonastrum trullifolium (Hook.f. & Thomson) Mosyakin
- Anemonastrum villosissimum (DC.) Holub
- Anemonastrum yulongshanicum (W.T.Wang) Mosyakin
- Anemonastrum zephyrum (A.Nelson) Holub
