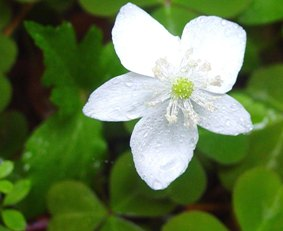

Scientific classification
- Kingdom: Plantae
- Clade: Tracheophytes
- Clade: Angiosperms
- Clade: Eudicots
- Order: Ranunculales
- Family: Ranunculaceae
- Genus: Anemonastrum
- Species: A. deltoideum

Binomial name
- Anemonastrum deltoideum (Douglas) Mosyakin

= Anemonastrum deltoideum =

Species of flowering plant

Anemonastrum deltoideum, also known by the common names Columbian windflower and western white anemone, is a species of flowering plant in the buttercup family Ranunculaceae. It is native to the forests of the west coast of the United States. This is a rhizomatous perennial herb growing between 10 and 30 centimeters tall. There is usually a single basal leaf which is divided into three large toothed leaflets, each up to 6 centimeters long. There may be more leaves along the mostly naked stem which are similar in appearance to the leaflets on the basal leaf. The inflorescence has three leaflike bracts and a single flower. The flower has no petals but five petal-like white sepals each one to two centimeters long. There are up to 120 whiskery stamens and many pistils. The fruit is a cluster of spherical achenes.
