= List of fauna of Washington =

This is a list of fauna observed in the U.S. state of Washington.

== Animals ==
=== Birds ===
- American robin (Turdus migratorius)
- Bald eagle (Haliaeetus leucocephalus)
- Chestnut-backed chickadee (Poecile rufescens)
- Dark-eyed junco (Junco hyemalis)
- Spotted towhee (Pipilo maculatus)
- Steller's jay (Cyanocitta stelleri)

=== Fish ===
- Beardslee trout (Oncorhynchus mykiss irideus var. beardsleei)
- Bull trout (Salvelinus confluentus)
- Chinook (king) salmon (Oncorhynchus tshawytscha)
- Coastal cutthroat trout (Oncorhynchus clarki clarki)
- Coho (silver) salmon (Oncorhynchus kisutch)
- Crescent trout (Oncorhynchus clarki crescenti)
- Dolly Varden trout (Salvelinus malma)
- Pink (humpback) salmon (Oncorhynchus gorbuscha)
- Rainbow trout (Oncorhynchus mykiss)
- Sockeye salmon (Oncorhynchus nerka)
- Westslope cutthroat trout (Oncorhynchus clarki lewisi)

=== Mammals ===
- American black bear (Ursus americanus)
- American pika (Ochotona princeps)
- Grizzly bear (Ursus arctos horribilis)
- Mountain beaver (Aplodontia rufa)
- Olympic marmot (Marmota olympus)
- Pygmy rabbit (Brachylagus idahoensis) (reintroduced)
- Roosevelt elk (Cervus canadensis roosevelti)
- Shrew-mole (Neurotrichus gibbsii)
- Snowshoe hare (Lepus americanus)
- Douglas squirrel (Tamiasciurus douglasii)
- Gray squirrel
- Gray digger squirrel
- Virginia opossum (introduced)
- Raccoon
- Fisher
- Black tailed deer
- Coyote (Canis latrans)
- Wolf
- Striped skunk
- Spotted skunk
- Wolverine
- North American porcupine (Erethizon dorsatum)
- Yellow-pine chipmunk (Tamias amoenus)

== See also ==
- List of flora of Washington
