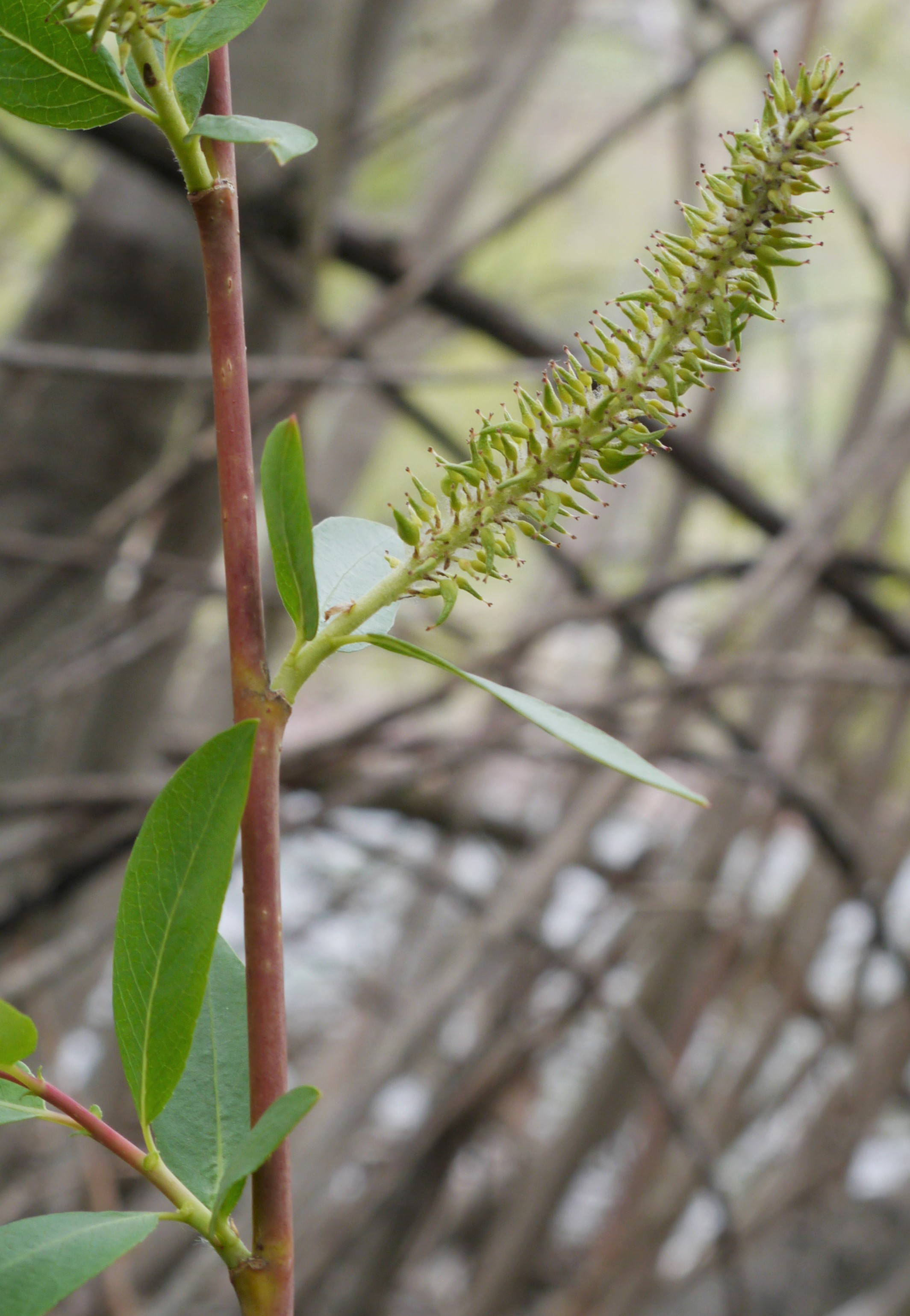

Conservation status
- Least Concern (IUCN 3.1)

Scientific classification
- Kingdom: Plantae
- Clade: Tracheophytes
- Clade: Angiosperms
- Clade: Eudicots
- Clade: Rosids
- Order: Malpighiales
- Family: Salicaceae
- Genus: Salix
- Species: S. prolixa

Binomial name
- Salix prolixa Andersson
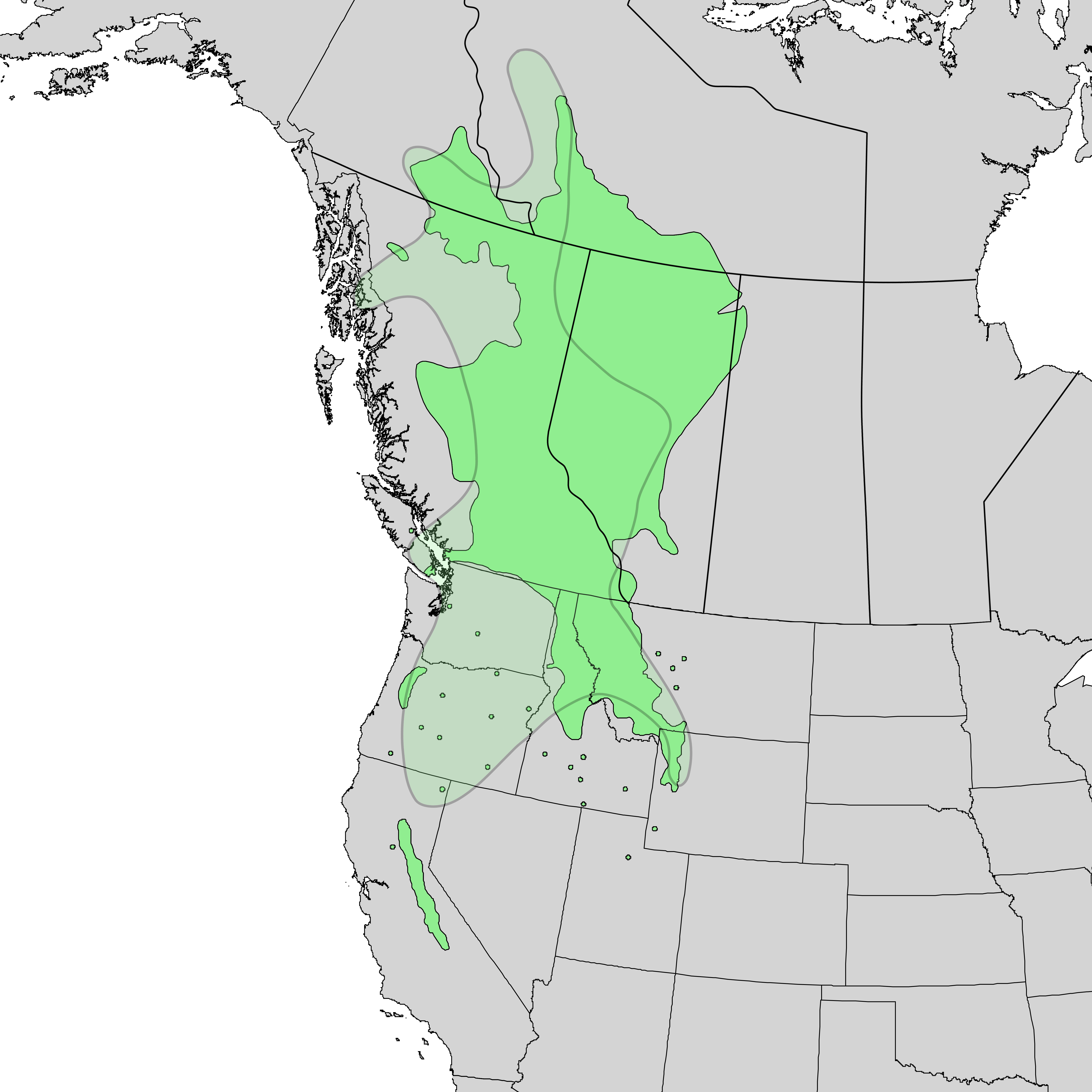
- Native range of Salix prolixa

= Salix prolixa =

Species of willow

Salix prolixa is a species of willow known by the common name MacKenzie's willow. It is native to western North America from Alaska and north-western Canada to the high mountains of California and Utah. It grows in moist habitat such as riverbanks, springs, and marshes. It is a shrub growing 1 to 5 meters tall. The lance-shaped or pointed, oval leaves are up to 15 cm long, hairless, waxy on the undersides, and accompanied by wide stipules. The inflorescence is a catkin of flowers.
