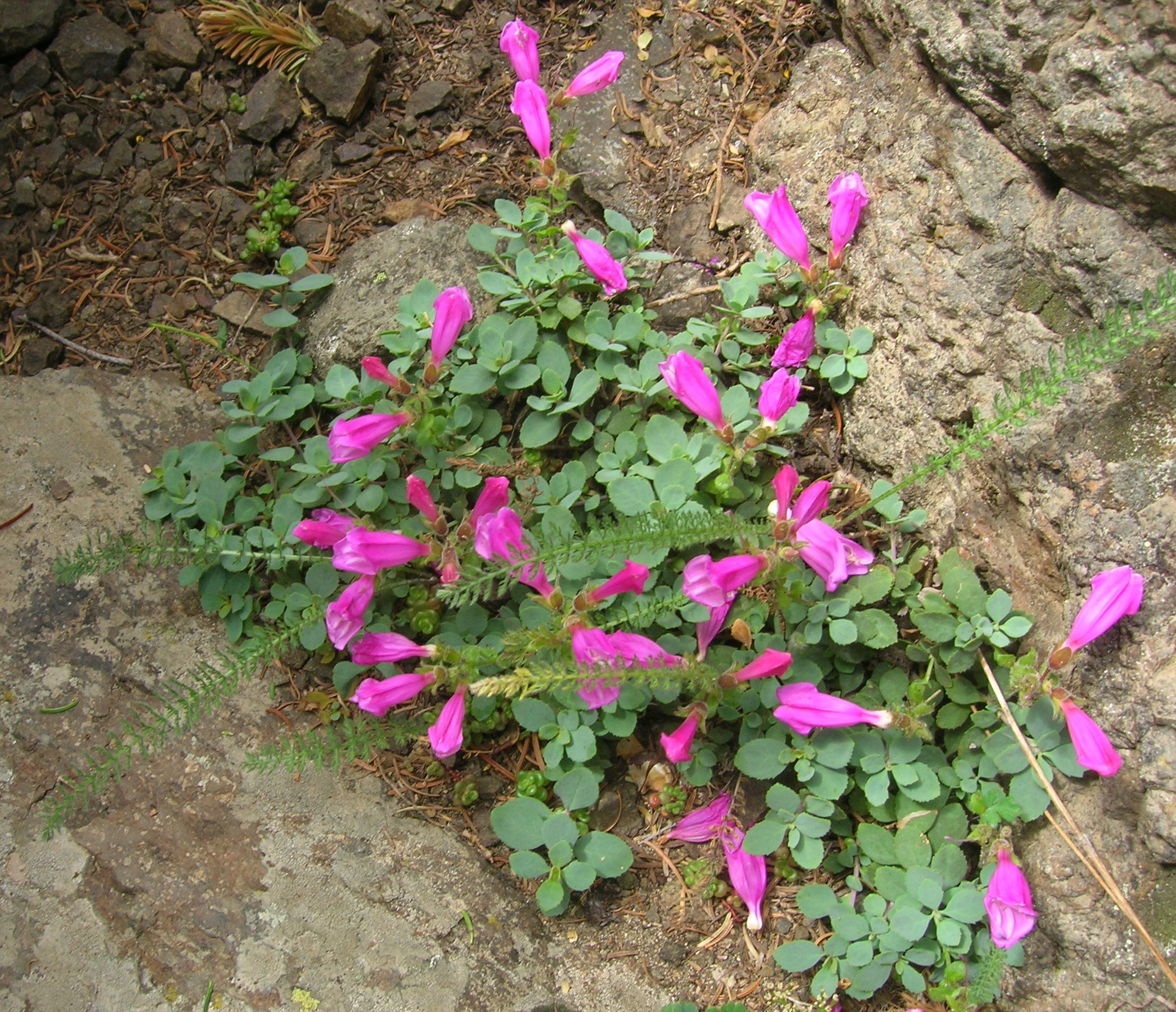
- Penstemon rupicola in Mount Rainier National Park

Conservation status
- Apparently Secure (NatureServe)

Scientific classification
- Kingdom: Plantae
- Clade: Tracheophytes
- Clade: Angiosperms
- Clade: Eudicots
- Clade: Asterids
- Order: Lamiales
- Family: Plantaginaceae
- Genus: Penstemon
- Species: P. rupicola

Binomial name
- Penstemon rupicola (Piper) T.J.Howell

= Penstemon rupicola =

Species of flowering plant

Penstemon rupicola is a species of penstemon known by the common names cliff beardtongue or rock penstemon. It is native to the west coast of the United States from Washington to the Klamath Mountains of far northern California, where it grows in rocky mountainous habitat. It is a clumpy, mat-forming subshrub growing no more than 14 centimeters high. The thick, waxy, oppositely arranged leaves are round or oval and up to 2 centimeters long. The showy wide-mouthed tubular flowers emerging from the mat may be nearly 4 centimeters in length and are shades of light purple to bright pink.

It has gained the Royal Horticultural Society's Award of Garden Merit.
