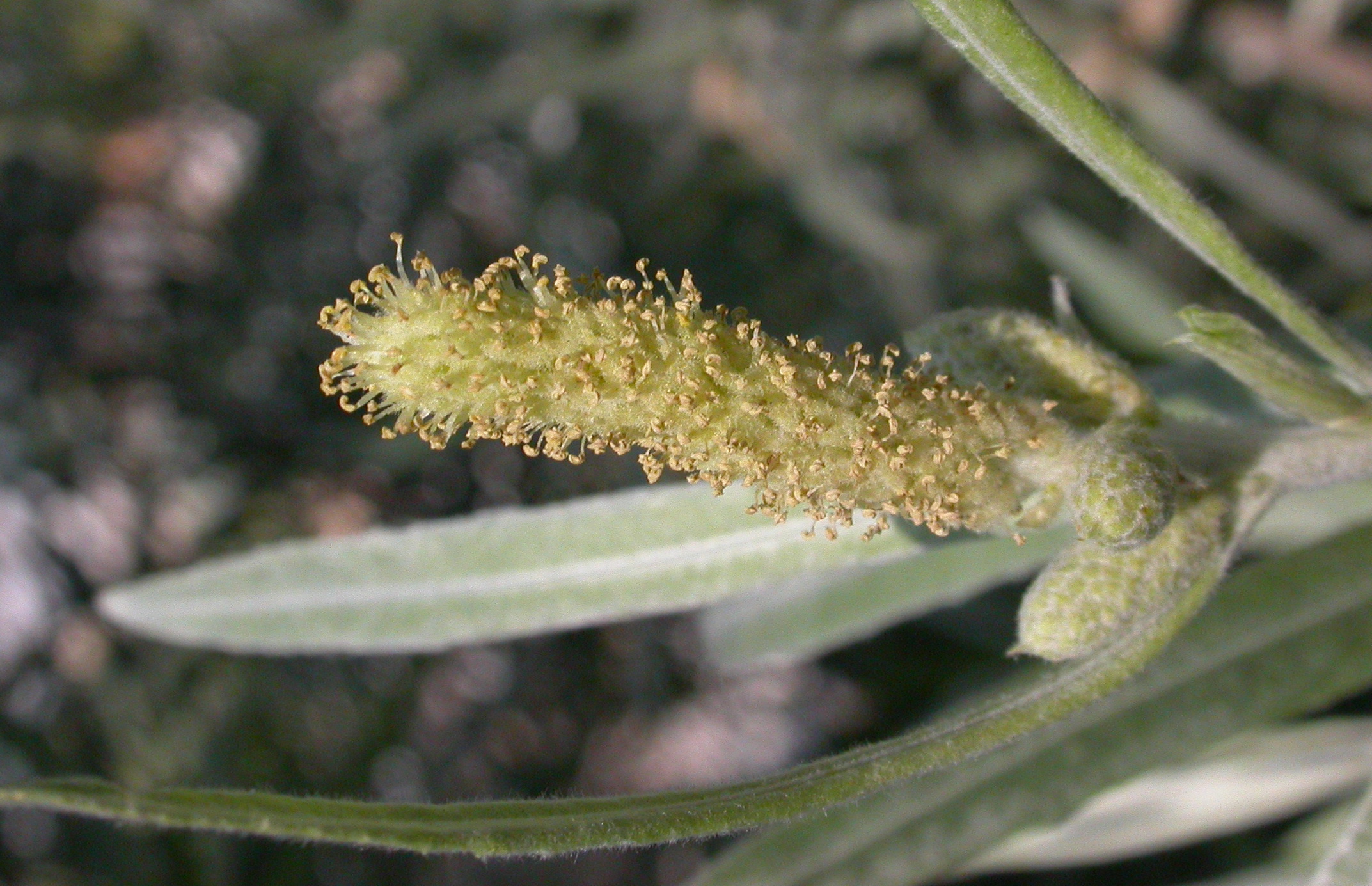
- Leaves and staminate flower

Conservation status
- Least Concern (IUCN 3.1)

Scientific classification
- Kingdom: Plantae
- Clade: Embryophytes
- Clade: Tracheophytes
- Clade: Angiosperms
- Clade: Eudicots
- Clade: Rosids
- Order: Malpighiales
- Family: Salicaceae
- Genus: Salix
- Species: S. exigua

Binomial name
- Salix exigua Nutt.
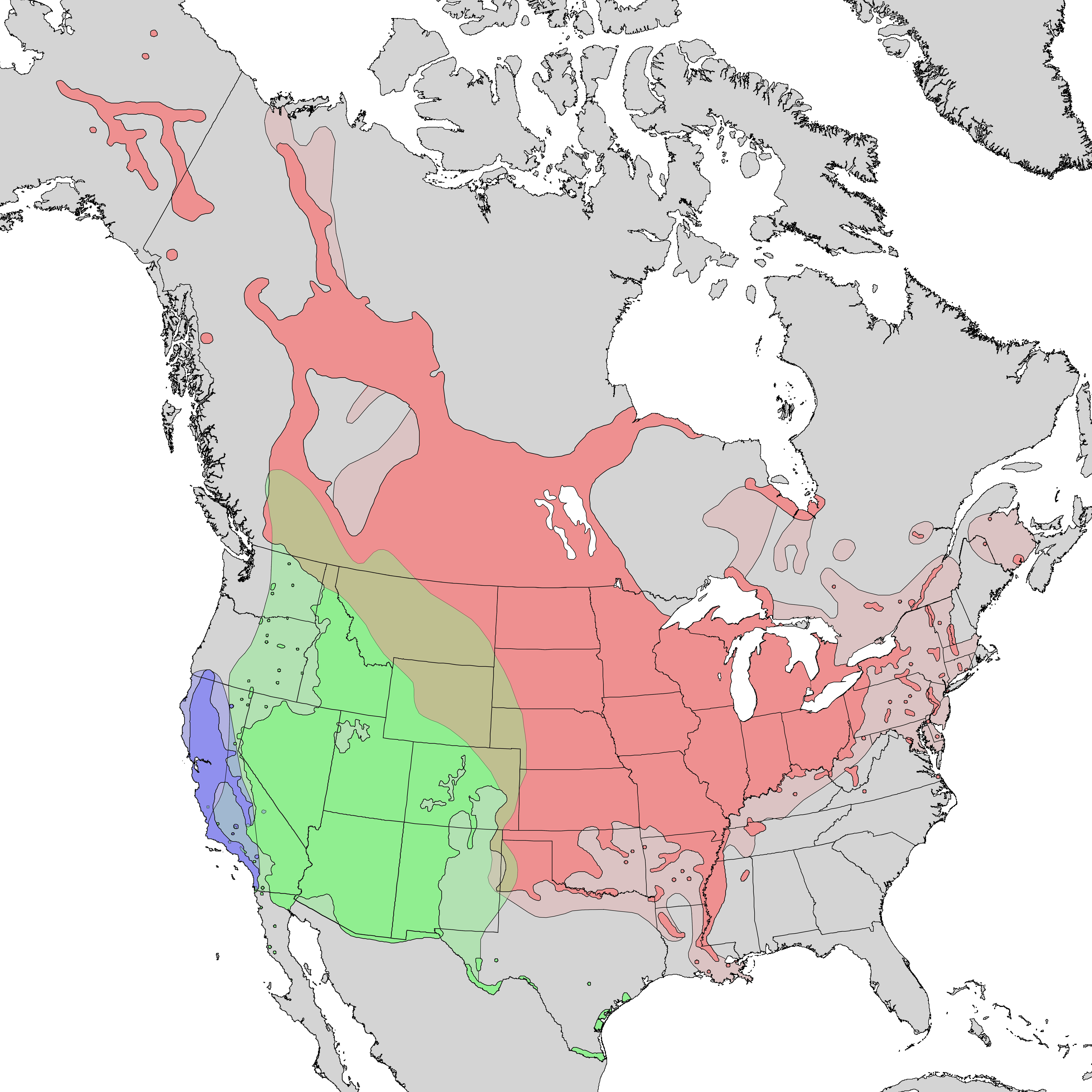
- Natural range of Salix exigua S.e.exigua: green, S.e.hindsiana: blue, S.e.interior: red

= Salix exigua =

Species of willow

Salix exigua (sandbar willow, narrowleaf willow, or coyote willow; syn. S. argophylla, S. hindsiana, S. interior, S. linearifolia, S. luteosericea, S. malacophylla, S. nevadensis, and S. parishiana) is a species of willow native to most of North America except for the southeast and far north, occurring from Alaska east to New Brunswick, and south to northern Mexico. It is considered a threatened species in Massachusetts while in Connecticut, Maryland, and New Hampshire it is considered endangered.

== Description ==
It is a deciduous shrub reaching 4–7 metres (13–23 ft) in height, exceptionally 7.6 m (25 ft) spreading by basal shoots to form dense clonal colonies. The leaves are narrow lanceolate, 4–12 centimetres (1 1/2–4 3/4 in) long and 2–10 millimetres (1/16–3/8 in) broad, green, to grayish with silky white hairs at least when young; the margin is entire or with a few irregular, widely spaced small teeth. The flowers are produced in catkins in late spring, after the leaves appear. It is dioecious, with staminate and pistillate catkins on separate plants, the male catkins up to 10 cm (4 in) long, the female catkins up to 8 cm (3 in) long. The fruit is a cluster of capsules, each containing numerous minute seeds embedded in shiny white silk.

== Subspecies and variants ==
The two subspecies, which meet in the western Great Plains, are:

- S. exigua subsp. exigua – western North America, leaves grayish all summer with persistent silky hairs, seed capsules 3–6 millimetres (0.12–0.24 in) long
- S. exigua subsp. interior (Rowlee) Cronq. (syn. S. interior Rowlee) – eastern and central North America, leaves usually lose hairs and become green by summer, only rarely remaining pubescent, seed capsules 5–8 millimetres (0.20–0.31 in) long

In California and Oregon,

- S. exigua var. hindsiana – Hinds' willow

== Cultivation ==
Salix exigua is cultivated as an ornamental tree. In the UK it has gained the Royal Horticultural Society's Award of Garden Merit.

== Uses ==
This willow has many uses for Native Americans; the branches are used as flexible poles and building materials, the smaller twigs are used to make baskets, the bark is made into cord and string, and the bark and leaves have several medicinal uses. The Zuni people take an infusion of the bark for coughs and sore throats.

The foliage is browsed by livestock.

== Ecology ==
The male flowers provide pollen for bees. It is a larval host to the California hairstreak, Lorquin's admiral, mourning cloak, sylvan hairstreak, tiger swallowtail, and viceroy.
