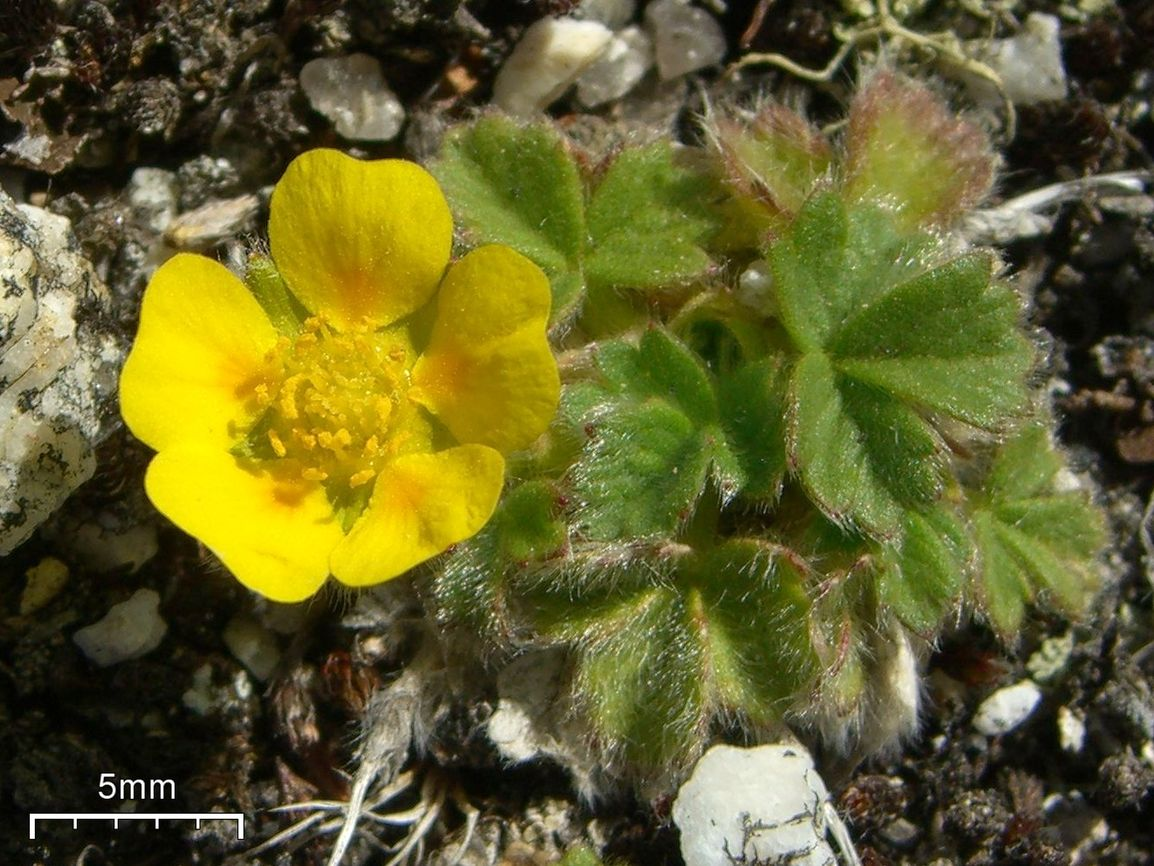

Conservation status
- Secure (NatureServe)

Scientific classification
- Kingdom: Plantae
- Clade: Embryophytes
- Clade: Tracheophytes
- Clade: Angiosperms
- Clade: Eudicots
- Clade: Rosids
- Order: Rosales
- Family: Rosaceae
- Genus: Potentilla
- Species: P. villosa

Binomial name
- Potentilla villosa Pallas ex. Pursh

= Potentilla villosa =

Species of flowering plant

Potentilla villosa is a species of flowering plant in the rose family, Rosaceae. Its common names include villous cinquefoil, northern cinquefoil, and hairy cinquefoil. It is native to northwestern North America, where its distribution extends from Alaska to Alberta to Oregon. There are records from eastern Asia.

== Habitat and ecology ==
This is a coastal plant. It occurs on coastal bluffs and beaches, and in meadows, tundra, and alpine talus.

== Description ==
This is a rhizomatous perennial herb with a tuft of several hairy to woolly stems growing from a thick base covered in previous seasons' dead foliage. The stems are up to 20 to 30 centimeters tall. The thick, leathery basal leaves are compound, divided into three veiny, toothed leaflets with woolly to silky-haired undersides. There may be a few leaves higher on the stem which are nearly the same size. The inflorescence bears one to five flowers. The flower has a five-lobed calyx and five bractlets at the base. The bowl-shaped corolla has five notched yellow petals each up to 1.2 centimeters long. Each petal is marked with an orange basal spot. There are usually 20 stamens at the center. Flowering occurs in July through September. The fruit is an achene, borne in clusters.
