= List of Canadian plants by family S =

Main page: List of Canadian plants by family

The following families of vascular plants are listed as occurring in Canada:

For mosses of Canada, see:

== Salicaceae ==
- Populus angustifolia — narrowleaf cottonwood
- Populus balsamifera — balsam poplar
- Populus deltoides — eastern cottonwood
- Populus grandidentata — largetooth aspen
- Populus heterophylla — swamp cottonwood
- Populus tremuloides — trembling aspen
- Populus × acuminata
- Populus × berolinensis
- Populus × brayshawii
- Populus × canadensis
- Populus × heimburgeri
- Populus × jackii — balm-of-Gilead
- Populus × rouleauiana
- Populus × smithii — Barnes' aspen
- Salix alaxensis — Alaska willow
- Salix amygdaloides — peach-leaved willow
- Salix arbusculoides — littletree willow
- Salix arctica — Arctic willow
- Salix arctophila — Arctic willow
- Salix argyrocarpa — northern willow
- Salix athabascensis — Athabasca willow
- Salix ballii — Ball's willow
- Salix barclayi — Barclay's willow
- Salix barrattiana — Barratt's willow
- Salix bebbiana — Bebb's willow
- Salix boothii — Booth's willow
- Salix brachycarpa — shortfruit willow
- Salix candida — hoary willow
- Salix cascadensis — Cascade willow
- Salix chamissonis — Chamisso's willow
- Salix chlorolepis — green-scaled willow
- Salix commutata — undergreen willow
- Salix cordata — sand dune willow
- Salix discolor — pussy willow
- Salix drummondiana — satiny salix
- Salix eriocephala — heart-leaved willow
- Salix exigua — narrowleaf willow
- Salix farriae — Farr's willow
- Salix fuscescens — Alaska bog willow
- Salix geyeriana — Geyer's willow
- Salix glauca — grey willow
- Salix hastata — halberd willow
- Salix herbacea — New England dwarf willow
- Salix hookeriana — Hooker's willow
- Salix humilis — prairie willow
- Salix jejuna — calcareous mat willow
- Salix lanata — lanate willow
- Salix lemmonii — Lemmon's willow
- Salix lucida — shining willow
- Salix lutea — yellow willow
- Salix maccalliana — McCall's willow
- Salix melanopsis — dusky willow
- Salix monochroma — one-colour willow
- Salix monticola — mountain willow
- Salix myricoides — blue-leaved willow
- Salix myrtillifolia — myrtle-leaf willow
- Salix nigra — black willow
- Salix nivalis — snow willow
- Salix orestera — greyleaf Sierran willow
- Salix ovalifolia — Arctic seashore willow
- Salix pedicellaris — bog willow
- Salix pedunculata — blackbract willow
- Salix pellita — satiny willow
- Salix petiolaris — meadow willow
- Salix petrophila — alpine willow
- Salix phlebophylla — skeletonleaf willow
- Salix planifolia — tea-leaved willow
- Salix polaris — polar willow
- Salix prolixa — MacKenzie's willow
- Salix pseudomonticola — false mountain willow
- Salix pyrifolia — balsam willow
- Salix raupii — Raup's willow
- Salix reticulata — net-veined willow
- Salix rotundifolia — roundleaf willow
- Salix scouleriana — Scouler's willow
- Salix sericea — silky willow
- Salix serissima — autumn willow
- Salix sessilifolia — Del Norte coast willow
- Salix setchelliana — Setchell's willow
- Salix silicicola — blanketleaf willow
- Salix sitchensis — Sitka willow
- Salix sphenophylla — wedgeleaf willow
- Salix stolonifera — creeping willow
- Salix turnorii — Turnor's willow
- Salix tweedyi — Tweedy's willow
- Salix uva-ursi — bearberry willow
- Salix vestita — rock willow
- Salix × amoena
- Salix × argusii
- Salix × beschelii
- Salix × brachypurpurea
- Salix × conifera
- Salix × cryptodonta
- Salix × dutillyi
- Salix × gaspeensis
- Salix × grayi
- Salix × jamesensis
- Salix × laurentiana
- Salix × obtusata
- Salix × paraleuca
- Salix × peasei
- Salix × pellicolor
- Salix × schneideri
- Salix × sericans
- Salix × simulans
- Salix × ungavensis
- Salix × waghornei
- Salix × wiegandii

== Santalaceae ==
- Comandra umbellata — umbellate bastard toadflax
- Geocaulon lividum — northern comandra

== Sarraceniaceae ==
- Sarracenia purpurea — purple pitcher-plant

== Saururaceae ==
- Saururus cernuus — lizard's-tail

== Saxifragaceae ==
- Boykinia occidentalis — coastal brookfoam
- Boykinia richardsonii — Richardson's brookfoam
- Chrysosplenium americanum — American golden-saxifrage
- Chrysosplenium iowense — Iowa golden-saxifrage
- Chrysosplenium rosendahlii — Rosendahl's golden-saxifrage
- Chrysosplenium tetrandrum — northern golden-carpet
- Chrysosplenium wrightii — Wright's golden-saxifrage
- Conimitella williamsii — Williams' conimitella
- Elmera racemosa — elmera
- Heuchera americana — American alumroot
- Heuchera chlorantha — greenflower alumroot
- Heuchera cylindrica — poker alumroot
- Heuchera flabellifolia — Bridger Mountain alumroot
- Heuchera glabra — alpine alumroot
- Heuchera grossulariifolia — gooseberry-leaf alumroot
- Heuchera micrantha — crevice alumroot
- Heuchera parvifolia — littleleaf alumroot
- Heuchera richardsonii — Richardson's alumroot
- Heuchera × easthamii
- Leptarrhena pyrolifolia — leatherleaf saxifrage
- Lithophragma glabrum — bulbous woodland-star
- Lithophragma parviflorum — smallflower woodland-star
- Lithophragma tenellum — slender woodland-star
- Micranthes stellaris, syn. Saxifraga stellaris — star saxifrage
- Mitella breweri — feathery bishop's-cap
- Mitella caulescens — creeping bishop's-cap
- Mitella diphylla — two-leaf bishop's-cap
- Mitella nuda — naked bishop's-cap
- Mitella ovalis — oval-leaf bishop's-cap
- Mitella pentandra — five-point bishop's-cap
- Mitella prostrata — creeping bishop's-cap
- Mitella trifida — Pacific bishop's-cap
- Parnassia fimbriata — fringed grass-of-Parnassus
- Parnassia glauca — Carolina grass-of-Parnassus
- Parnassia kotzebuei — Kotzebue's grass-of-Parnassus
- Parnassia multiseta — boreal grass-of-Parnassus
- Parnassia palustris — marsh grass-of-Parnassus
- Saxifraga adscendens — ascending saxifrage
- Saxifraga aizoides — yellow mountain saxifrage
- Saxifraga bronchialis — matte saxifrage
- Saxifraga cernua — nodding saxifrage
- Saxifraga cespitosa — tufted saxifrage
- Saxifraga eschscholtzii — cushion saxifrage
- Saxifraga ferruginea — rusty-hair saxifrage
- Saxifraga flagellaris — spider saxifrage
- Saxifraga foliolosa — leafy saxifrage
- Saxifraga gaspensis — Gaspé saxifrage
- Saxifraga hieracifolia — stiffstem saxifrage
- Saxifraga hirculus — yellow marsh saxifrage
- Saxifraga hyperborea — pygmy saxifrage
- Saxifraga integrifolia — northwestern saxifrage
- Saxifraga lyallii — redstem saxifrage
- Saxifraga mertensiana — Mertens' saxifrage
- Saxifraga nelsoniana — heartleaf saxifrage
- Saxifraga nidifica — peak saxifrage
- Saxifraga nivalis — snow saxifrage
- Saxifraga occidentalis — western saxifrage
- Saxifraga odontoloma — streambank saxifrage
- Saxifraga oppositifolia — purple mountain saxifrage
- Saxifraga oregana — bog saxifrage
- Saxifraga paniculata — white mountain saxifrage
- Saxifraga pensylvanica — swamp saxifrage
- Saxifraga platysepala — broadsepal saxifrage
- Saxifraga razshivinii — Razshivin's saxifrage
- Saxifraga redofskii — many-flower saxifrage
- Saxifraga reflexa — Yukon saxifrage
- Saxifraga rhomboidea — diamondleaf saxifrage
- Saxifraga rivularis — alpine brook saxifrage
- Saxifraga rufidula — redwool saxifrage
- Saxifraga rufopilosa — redhair saxifrage
- Saxifraga serpyllifolia — thyme-leaf saxifrage
- Saxifraga sibirica — Siberian saxifrage
- Saxifraga spicata — spiked saxifrage
- Saxifraga taylorii — Taylor's saxifrage
- Saxifraga tenuis — Ottertail Pass saxifrage
- Saxifraga tolmiei — Tolmie's saxifrage
- Saxifraga tricuspidata — prickly saxifrage
- Saxifraga virginiensis — Virginia saxifrage
- Saxifraga × geum
- Suksdorfia ranunculifolia — buttercup-leaf suksdorfia
- Suksdorfia violacea — violet suksdorfia
- Telesonix heucheriformis — false saxifrage
- Tellima grandiflora — large fringe-cup
- Tiarella cordifolia — heartleaf foamflower
- Tiarella trifoliata — lace foamflower
- Tolmiea menziesii — piggyback plant

== Scapaniaceae ==
- Diplophyllum albicans
- Diplophyllum apiculatum
- Diplophyllum imbricatum
- Diplophyllum microdontum
- Diplophyllum obtusatum
- Diplophyllum obtusifolium
- Diplophyllum taxifolium
- Scapania americana
- Scapania apiculata
- Scapania brevicaulis
- Scapania carinthiaca
- Scapania crassiretis
- Scapania curta
- Scapania cuspiduligera
- Scapania degenii
- Scapania glaucocephala
- Scapania gymnostomophila
- Scapania hyperborea
- Scapania irrigua
- Scapania ligulifolia
- Scapania massalongi
- Scapania mucronata
- Scapania nemorosa
- Scapania obcordata
- Scapania obscura
- Scapania paludicola
- Scapania paludosa
- Scapania parvifolia
- Scapania scandica
- Scapania simmonsii
- Scapania spitzbergensis
- Scapania subalpina
- Scapania uliginosa
- Scapania umbrosa
- Scapania undulata

== Scheuchzeriaceae ==
- Scheuchzeria palustris — pod grass

== Schistostegaceae ==
- Schistostega pennata — luminous moss

== Schizaeaceae ==
- Schizaea pusilla — curly-grass fern

== Scouleriaceae ==
- Scouleria aquatica
- Scouleria marginata

== Scrophulariaceae ==
- Agalinis aspera — rough purple false foxglove
- Agalinis gattingeri — roundstem false foxglove
- Agalinis maritima — saltmarsh false foxglove
- Agalinis neoscotica — Nova Scotia false foxglove
- Agalinis paupercula — smallflower false foxglove
- Agalinis purpurea — large-purple false foxglove
- Agalinis skinneriana — pale false foxglove
- Agalinis tenuifolia — slender false foxglove
- Aureolaria flava — smooth yellow false foxglove
- Aureolaria pedicularia — fernleaf yellow false foxglove
- Aureolaria virginica — downy false foxglove
- Bacopa rotundifolia — roundleaf water-hyssop
- Bartsia alpina — alpine bartsia
- Besseya wyomingensis — Wyoming coral-drops
- Buchnera americana — bluehearts
- Castilleja ambigua — paintbrush owl's-clover
- Castilleja angustifolia — northwestern Indian-paintbrush
- Castilleja annua — annual Indian-paintbrush
- Castilleja attenuata — narrowleaf owl's-clover
- Castilleja caudata — Port Clarence Indian-paintbrush
- Castilleja cervina — deer Indian-paintbrush
- Castilleja coccinea — scarlet Indian-paintbrush
- Castilleja cusickii — Cusick's Indian-paintbrush
- Castilleja elegans — elegant Indian-paintbrush
- Castilleja elmeri — Elmer's Indian-paintbrush
- Castilleja hispida — harsh Indian-paintbrush
- Castilleja hyperborea — northern Indian-paintbrush
- Castilleja levisecta — golden paintbrush
- Castilleja lutescens — stiff yellow Indian-paintbrush
- Castilleja miniata — greater red Indian-paintbrush
- Castilleja minor — smallflower Indian-paintbrush
- Castilleja occidentalis — western Indian-paintbrush
- Castilleja pallescens — pallid Indian-paintbrush
- Castilleja parviflora — small-flowered Indian-paintbrush
- Castilleja raupii — Raup's Indian-paintbrush
- Castilleja rhexiifolia — rhexia-leaf Indian-paintbrush
- Castilleja rupicola — cliff Indian-paintbrush
- Castilleja septentrionalis — Labrador Indian-paintbrush
- Castilleja sessiliflora — downy Indian-paintbrush
- Castilleja sulphurea — sulphur Indian-paintbrush
- Castilleja tenuis — hairy owl's-clover
- Castilleja thompsonii — Thompson's Indian-paintbrush
- Castilleja unalaschcensis — Alaska Indian-paintbrush
- Castilleja yukonis — Yukon Indian-paintbrush
- Chelone glabra — white turtlehead
- Collinsia grandiflora — giant blue-eyed mary
- Collinsia parviflora — small-flowered blue-eyed mary
- Collinsia verna — spring blue-eyed mary
- Euphrasia frigida — cold-weather eyebright
- Euphrasia hudsoniana — Hudson's eyebright
- Euphrasia nemorosa — common eyebright
- Euphrasia oakesii — Oakes' eyebright
- Euphrasia randii — small eyebright
- Euphrasia subarctica — Arctic eyebright
- Euphrasia suborbicularis — roundleaf eyebright
- Euphrasia vinacea — glacier eyebright
- Euphrasia × aequalis
- Euphrasia × vestita
- Euphrasia × villosa
- Gratiola aurea — golden hedge-hyssop
- Gratiola ebracteata — bractless hedge-hyssop
- Gratiola neglecta — clammy hedge-hyssop
- Lagotis minor — little weaselsnout
- Leucospora multifida — cliff conobea
- Limosella aquatica — northern mudwort
- Limosella australis — mudwort
- Lindernia dubia — yellowseed false pimpernel
- Melampyrum lineare — American cow-wheat
- Mimetanthe pilosa — false monkeyflower
- Mimulus alatus — sharpwing monkeyflower
- Mimulus alsinoides — chickweed monkeyflower
- Mimulus breviflorus — shortflower monkeyflower
- Mimulus breweri — Brewer's monkeyflower
- Mimulus cardinalis — scarlet monkeyflower
- Mimulus dentatus — toothleaf monkeyflower
- Mimulus floribundus — floriferous monkeyflower
- Mimulus glabratus — roundleaf monkeyflower
- Mimulus guttatus — common large monkeyflower
- Mimulus lewisii — Lewis' monkeyflower
- Mimulus moschatus — muskflower
- Mimulus ringens — squarestem monkeyflower
- Mimulus tilingii — subalpine monkeyflower
- Nothochelone nemorosa — woodland beardtongue
- Nuttallanthus canadensis — old-field toadflax
- Nuttallanthus texanus — Texas toadflax
- Orthocarpus barbatus — Grand Coules owl's-clover
- Orthocarpus bracteosus — rosy owl's-clover
- Orthocarpus imbricatus — mountain owl's-clover
- Orthocarpus luteus — yellow owl's-clover
- Orthocarpus tenuifolius — goldtongue
- Pedicularis bracteosa — Canadian lousewort
- Pedicularis canadensis — early wood lousewort
- Pedicularis capitata — capitate lousewort
- Pedicularis contorta — curvebeak lousewort
- Pedicularis flammea — redtip lousewort
- Pedicularis furbishiae — Furbish's lousewort
- Pedicularis groenlandica — bull elephant's-head
- Pedicularis hirsuta — hairy lousewort
- Pedicularis labradorica — Labrador lousewort
- Pedicularis lanata — woolly lousewort
- Pedicularis lanceolata — swamp lousewort
- Pedicularis langsdorfii — Langsdorf's lousewort
- Pedicularis lapponica — northern lousewort
- Pedicularis macrodonta — muskeg lousewort
- Pedicularis oederi — Öder's lousewort
- Pedicularis ornithorhyncha — bird's-beak lousewort
- Pedicularis palustris — purple lousewort
- Pedicularis parviflora — smallflower lousewort
- Pedicularis racemosa — leafy lousewort
- Pedicularis sudetica — sudetic lousewort
- Pedicularis verticillata — whorled lousewort
- Penstemon albertinus — Alberta beardtongue
- Penstemon albidus — whiteflower beardtongue
- Penstemon attenuatus — taperleaf beardtongue
- Penstemon confertus — yellow beardtongue
- Penstemon davidsonii — creeping beardtongue
- Penstemon digitalis — foxglove beardtongue
- Penstemon ellipticus — eggleaf beardtongue
- Penstemon eriantherus — crested-tongue beardtongue
- Penstemon fruticosus — shrubby beardtongue
- Penstemon gormanii — Gorman's beardtongue
- Penstemon gracilis — slender beardtongue
- Penstemon hirsutus — hairy beardtongue
- Penstemon laevigatus — smooth beardtongue
- Penstemon lyallii — Lyall's beardtongue
- Penstemon nitidus — waxleaf beardtongue
- Penstemon ovatus — broadleaf beardtongue
- Penstemon procerus — smallflower beardtongue
- Penstemon pruinosus — Chelan beardtongue
- Penstemon richardsonii — Richardson's beardtongue
- Penstemon serrulatus — Cascade beardtongue
- Rhinanthus minor — little yellow-rattle
- Scrophularia lanceolata — hare figwort
- Scrophularia marilandica — Carpenter's square figwort
- Scrophularia oregana — Oregon figwort
- Synthyris borealis — Alaska kittentail
- Tonella tenella — smallflower tonella
- Triphysaria eriantha — Jonny-Turk owl's-clover
- Triphysaria pusilla — dwarf owl's-clover
- Triphysaria versicolor — yellowbeak false owl's-clover
- Veronica alpina — alpine speedwell
- Veronica americana — American speedwell
- Veronica anagallis-aquatica — brook-pimpernel
- Veronica cusickii — Cusick's speedwell
- Veronica officinalis — gypsyweed
- Veronica peregrina — purslane speedwell
- Veronica scutellata — marsh speedwell
- Veronica serpyllifolia — thyme-leaf speedwell
- Veronica wormskjoldii — Wormskjold's alpine speedwell
- Veronicastrum virginicum — culver's-root

== Selaginellaceae ==
- Selaginella densa — dense spikemoss
- Selaginella eclipes — hidden spikemoss
- Selaginella oregana — Oregon spikemoss
- Selaginella rupestris — ledge spikemoss
- Selaginella selaginoides — low spikemoss
- Selaginella sibirica — northern spikemoss
- Selaginella wallacei — Wallace's spikemoss

== Seligeriaceae ==
- Blindia acuta
- Brachydontium olympicum
- Seligeria acutifolia
- Seligeria brevifolia
- Seligeria calcarea
- Seligeria campylopoda
- Seligeria careyana
- Seligeria diversifolia
- Seligeria donniana
- Seligeria oelandica
- Seligeria polaris
- Seligeria pusilla
- Seligeria recurvata
- Seligeria subimmersa
- Seligeria tristichoides

== Sematophyllaceae ==
- Brotherella recurvans
- Brotherella roellii
- Heterophyllium affine
- Sematophyllum adnatum
- Sematophyllum demissum
- Sematophyllum marylandicum
- Wijkia carlottae

== Smilacaceae ==
- Smilax ecirrata — upright greenbrier
- Smilax herbacea — smooth herbaceous greenbrier
- Smilax illinoensis — Illinois greenbrier
- Smilax lasioneura — herbaceous greenbrier
- Smilax rotundifolia — common greenbrier
- Smilax tamnoides — halberd-leaf greenbrier

== Solanaceae ==
- Leucophysalis grandiflora — large-flowered ground-cherry
- Nicotiana attenuata — coyote tobacco
- Physalis heterophylla — clammy ground-cherry
- Physalis longifolia — longleaf ground-cherry
- Physalis virginiana — Virginia ground-cherry
- Solanum americanum — American nightshade
- Solanum ptychanthum — black nightshade
- Solanum triflorum — cutleaf nightshade

== Sparganiaceae ==
- Sparganium americanum — American bur-reed
- Sparganium androcladum — branching bur-reed
- Sparganium angustifolium — narrowleaf bur-reed
- Sparganium erectum — simplestem bur-reed
- Sparganium eurycarpum — large bur-reed
- Sparganium fluctuans — floating bur-reed
- Sparganium glomeratum — northern bur-reed
- Sparganium hyperboreum — boreal bur-reed
- Sparganium natans — small bur-reed

== Sphagnaceae ==
- Sphagnum affine
- Sphagnum andersonianum
- Sphagnum angermanicum
- Sphagnum angustifolium — narrowleaf peatmoss
- Sphagnum annulatum
- Sphagnum aongstroemii
- Sphagnum arcticum
- Sphagnum balticum
- Sphagnum bartlettianum — Bartlett's peatmoss
- Sphagnum capillifolium — northern peatmoss
- Sphagnum centrale
- Sphagnum compactum — low peatmoss
- Sphagnum contortum
- Sphagnum cuspidatum — toothed peatmoss
- Sphagnum fallax — flat-top peatmoss
- Sphagnum fimbriatum — fringed bog moss
- Sphagnum flavicomans
- Sphagnum flexuosum — flexuous peatmoss
- Sphagnum fuscum — brown peatmoss
- Sphagnum girgensohnii — Girgensohn's peatmoss
- Sphagnum henryense — Henry's peatmoss
- Sphagnum inundatum
- Sphagnum jensenii
- Sphagnum junghuhnianum
- Sphagnum lenense
- Sphagnum lescurii — yellow peatmoss
- Sphagnum lindbergii
- Sphagnum macrophyllum
- Sphagnum magellanicum — Magellan's peatmoss
- Sphagnum majus — greater peatmoss
- Sphagnum mendocinum — Mendocino peatmoss
- Sphagnum molle
- Sphagnum nitidum
- Sphagnum obtusum
- Sphagnum orientale
- Sphagnum pacificum — Pacific peatmoss
- Sphagnum palustre — prairie peatmoss
- Sphagnum papillosum — papillose peatmoss
- Sphagnum platyphyllum
- Sphagnum pulchrum — beautiful peatmoss
- Sphagnum pylaesii — simple peatmoss
- Sphagnum quinquefarium — five-ranked bogmoss
- Sphagnum recurvum — recurved peatmoss
- Sphagnum riparium
- Sphagnum rubellum — red peatmoss
- Sphagnum rubiginosum
- Sphagnum russowii — Russow's peatmoss
- Sphagnum schofieldii
- Sphagnum splendens
- Sphagnum squarrosum
- Sphagnum steerei
- Sphagnum strictum
- Sphagnum subnitens
- Sphagnum subobesum
- Sphagnum subsecundum — orange peatmoss
- Sphagnum subtile
- Sphagnum tenellum — delicate peatmoss
- Sphagnum tenerum
- Sphagnum teres
- Sphagnum torreyanum — giant peatmoss
- Sphagnum warnstorfii — fen peatmoss
- Sphagnum wilfii
- Sphagnum wulfianum — Wulf's peatmoss

== Splachnaceae ==
- Aplodon wormskjoldii
- Splachnum ampullaceum
- Splachnum luteum
- Splachnum pennsylvanicum — southern dung moss
- Splachnum rubrum
- Splachnum sphaericum
- Splachnum vasculosum
- Tayloria acuminata
- Tayloria froelichiana
- Tayloria hornschuchii
- Tayloria ligulata
- Tayloria serrata
- Tayloria splachnoides
- Tetraplodon angustatus
- Tetraplodon mnioides
- Tetraplodon pallidus
- Tetraplodon paradoxus
- Tetraplodon urceolatus
- Voitia nivalis

== Staphyleaceae ==
- Staphylea trifolia — American bladdernut
