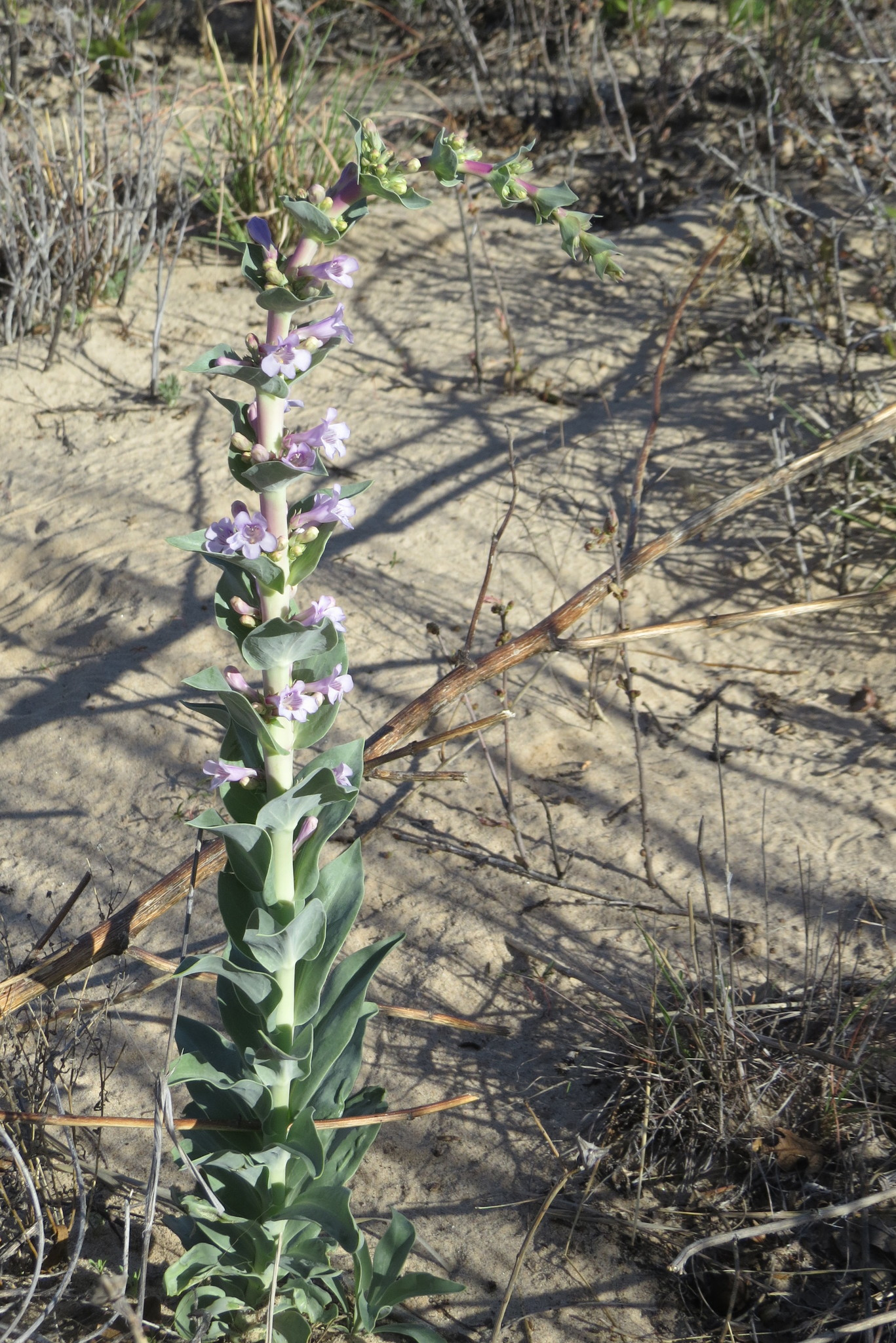
- Near Mescalero Sands, Chaves County, New Mexico

Conservation status
- Apparently Secure (NatureServe)

Scientific classification
- Kingdom: Plantae
- Clade: Tracheophytes
- Clade: Angiosperms
- Clade: Eudicots
- Clade: Asterids
- Order: Lamiales
- Family: Plantaginaceae
- Genus: Penstemon
- Species: P. buckleyi

Binomial name
- Penstemon buckleyi Pennell

Synonyms
- Penstemon amplexicaulis Buckley

= Penstemon buckleyi =

Plant species in the veronica family

Penstemon buckleyi, also known as Buckley's penstemon or Buckley's beardtongue, is a species of penstemon in the veronica family. It grows in southern parts of the Great Plains in the United States. It grows in sandy soils and sand dunes.

== Description ==
Penstemon buckleyi is a herbaceous plant with stems that grow straight upwards or outwards a short distance before growing upwards reaching as much as 82 centimeters (32 in), but more commonly 15 to 55 cm (6 to 22 in). They are stoutly built and grow from branched caudex or large crown topping a taproot. Each plant will have one to five stems that are hairless and glaucous, covered in a waxy bloom, as are its leaves.

The gray-green leaves are somewhat thick with smooth edges. The basal leaves, those at the base of the plant, and the lowest leaves attached to the stems are 1.9–15 cm long, though usually less than 11.6 cm. They can be 3.1 cm wide, though more typically 0.3–2.3 cm, and spatulate to oblanceolate in shape. There are three to nine pairs of cauline leaves, those on the stems, that attach directly to the stem with a base that clasps the stem or is cordate-clasping.

The flowers are in verticillasters, groups of flowers and bracts along the stem making up the inflorescence, that are more informally called whorls. Each stem will typically have two to twenty groups of flowers, but occasionally as many as 35. In each group there will be two cymes each with two to eleven flowers facing in every direction.

The flowers are funnel shaped opening to five lobes, the lower ones spreading and the upper ones also spreading or slightly reflexed, bent backwards. They have a range of colors from pink to lavender to very pale blue.

== Taxonomy ==
Penstemon buckleyi was scientifically described by Samuel Botsford Buckley in 1861 with the name Penstemon amplexicaulis, however this name had been previously used by Conrad Moench in 1794, now a synonym for Penstemon hirsutus. This prior usage made it an illegitimate name and it was described in 1921 by Francis W. Pennell as Penstemon buckleyi, also correcting some errors in the earlier description. It is part of the Penstemon genus in the family Plantaginaceae.

=== Names ===
Penstemon buckleyi is known by the related common names Buckley's penstemon and Buckley's beardtongue. It is also sometimes called sand beardtongue.

== Range and habitat ==
The Natural Resources Conservation Service lists Penstemon buckleyi as native in the states of Texas, Oklahoma, New Mexico, Kansas, Colorado, and Nebraska, however the populations in Banner and Platte counties, Nebraska are well north of the rest of its range and are likely to be introductions through the road network.

In Texas it grows in the western part of the state north of Crane County into the panhandle. In New Mexico they are documented in the southeastern corner of the state in Eddy Lea counties. In Oklahoma it grows in the western half of the state. In Colorado it is native to seven of the eastern counties. To the eas it is found in north central and southwest Kansas.

It grow in sandy soils in the sandsage or mixed grass prairies. It a dune endemic plant in part of the Chihuahuan Desert as well as dune fields associated with streams in the southern Great Plains.

=== Conservation ===
Penstemon buckleyi was evaluated by NatureServe in 1992 and rated as apparently secure (G4). At the state level they rated it as vulnerable (S3) in Kansas, imperiled (S2) in Colorado, and critically imperiled (S1) in Nebraska.

== See also ==
List of Penstemon species
