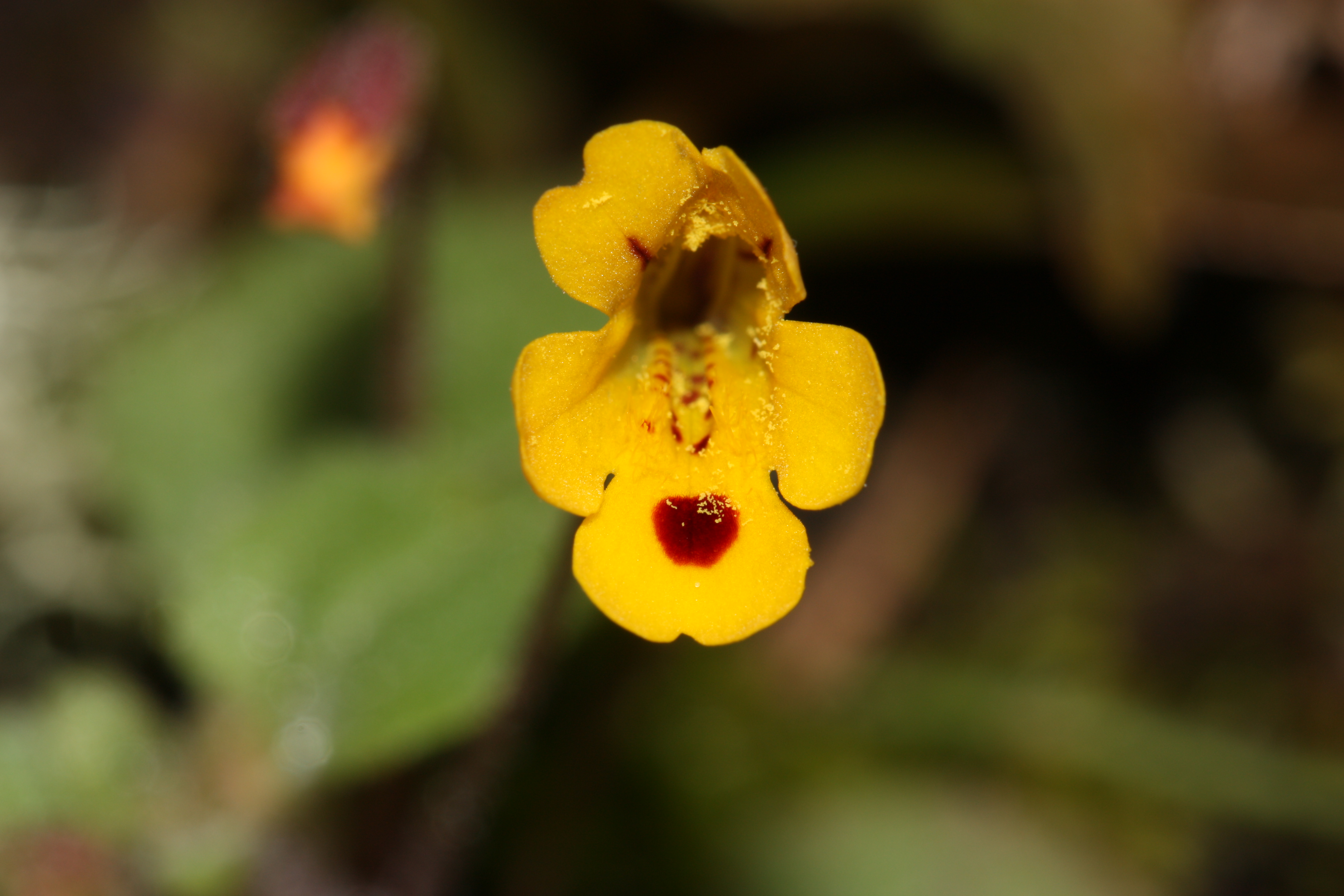
- Erythranthe alsinoides in John B. Yeon State Scenic Corridor

Conservation status
- Least Concern (IUCN 3.1)

- Secure (NatureServe)

Scientific classification
- Kingdom: Plantae
- Clade: Embryophytes
- Clade: Tracheophytes
- Clade: Angiosperms
- Clade: Eudicots
- Clade: Asterids
- Order: Lamiales
- Family: Phrymaceae
- Genus: Erythranthe
- Species: E. alsinoides

Binomial name
- Erythranthe alsinoides (Dougl. ex Benth.) G.L.Nesom & N.S.Fraga

Synonyms
- Mimulus alsinoides Douglas ex Benth.; Mimulus alsinoides var. minimus Benth.; Mimulus alsinoides var. paniculatus Benth.

= Erythranthe alsinoides =

Species of flowering plant

Erythranthe alsinoides is a species of monkeyflower known by the common names wingstem monkeyflower and chickweed monkeyflower. It was formerly known as Mimulus alsinoides.

== Distribution and habitat ==
It is native to western North America from British Columbia to the Klamath Mountains of far northern California, where it grows in moist and wet wooded habitat, such as moss beds and rocky stream banks.

== Description ==
Erythranthe alsinoides is an annual herb producing an erect stem up to about 15 centimeters tall. The oval green to red-tinged leaves are slightly to obviously toothed. Less than 2 centimeters long with 3 to 5 prominent veins on the upper surface, they are oppositely arranged about the small stem.

Each flower arises on an erect reddish pedicel. The base of the flower is surrounded by a slightly hairy red calyx of sepals. The yellow corolla of the flower has two lobes on its upper lip and three on its lower. The lower lip has a large red spot and there are usually other red marks in the corolla. The fruit is a small capsule.
