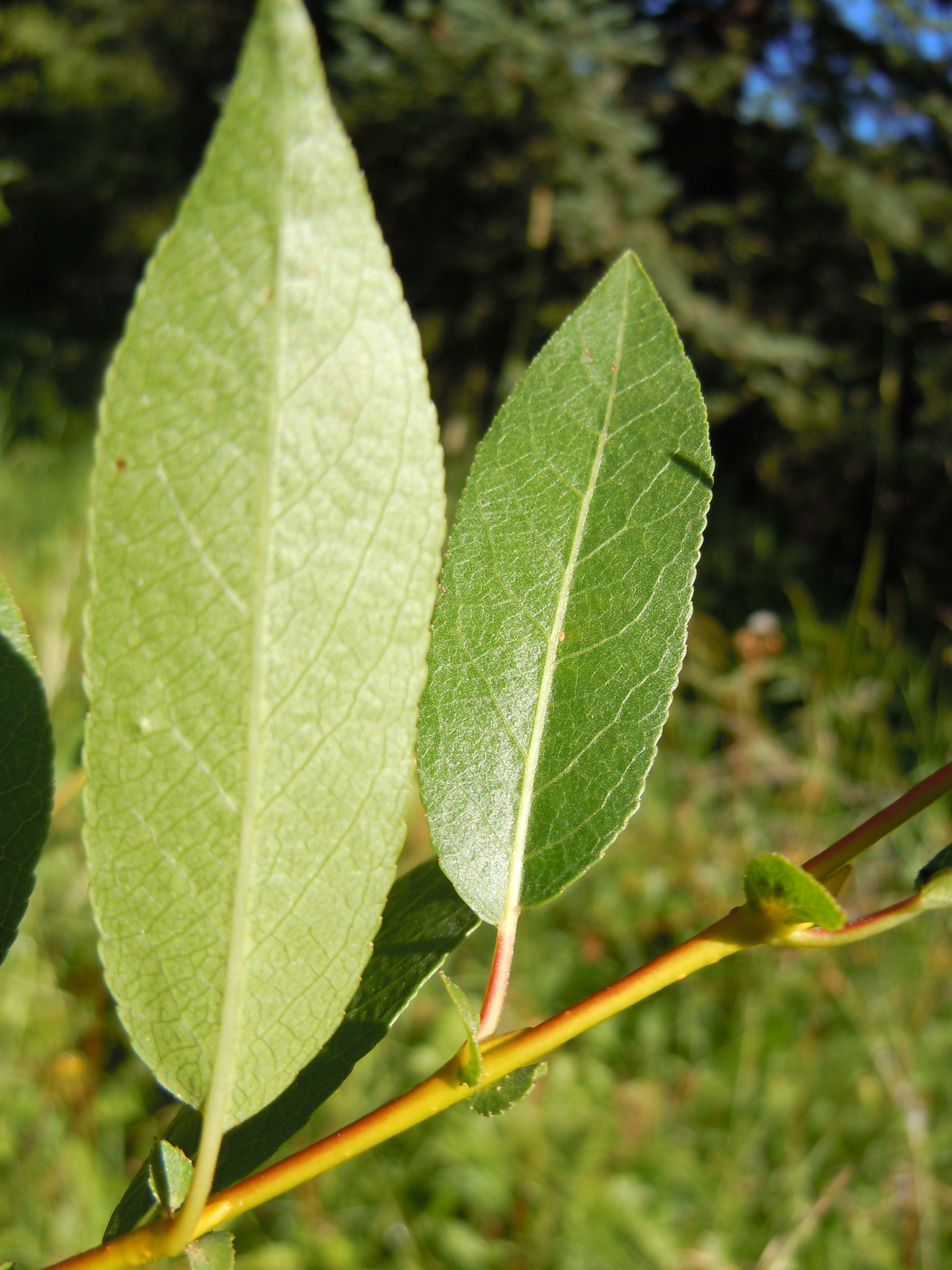

Conservation status
- Secure (NatureServe)

Scientific classification
- Kingdom: Plantae
- Clade: Tracheophytes
- Clade: Angiosperms
- Clade: Eudicots
- Clade: Rosids
- Order: Malpighiales
- Family: Salicaceae
- Genus: Salix
- Species: S. boothii

Binomial name
- Salix boothii Dorn

= Salix boothii =

Species of willow

Salix boothii is a species of willow known by the common name Booth's willow.

It is native to western North America from British Columbia and Alberta south to California and New Mexico. It grows in moist mountain habitat, such as riverbanks.

== Description ==
Salix boothii is a shrub that can reach 6 metres (20 ft) in height. It is larger and has more branches in well-drained soils, and takes a smaller, simpler form in saturated areas such as bogs. The leaves are lance-shaped to oval with a pointed tip and smooth-edged or lightly serrated. They are up to 10 cm long when mature with a shiny top surface; new leaves are covered in shaggy white hairs.

The inflorescences develop before the leaves grow, or simultaneously. Male catkins are up to about 4 cm long and female catkins are up to 7 cm. Male flowers have two stamens. Its blooming period is May and June.

It reproduces sexually by seed and also vegetatively by sprouting from its stem base and root system, allowing it to produce colonies of clones.

== Uses ==
This willow forms dense colonial thickets and it can be used for erosion control in riparian zone habitats in its native range. It is also tolerant of wildfire, resprouting relatively easily after aboveground parts have been burned away.
