= Salix athabascensis =

Conservation status
- Least Concern (IUCN 3.1)

Scientific classification
- Kingdom: Plantae
- Clade: Tracheophytes
- Clade: Angiosperms
- Clade: Eudicots
- Clade: Rosids
- Order: Malpighiales
- Family: Salicaceae
- Genus: Salix
- Species: S. athabascensis

Binomial name
- Salix athabascensis Raup

Species of willow

Salix athabascensis is a species of willow first described by Hugh Miller Raup.

== Range ==
It is found in fens, bogs, and treed bogs; from 0–1800 meters in Alberta, British Columbia, Manitoba, the Northwest Territories, Saskatchewan, Yukon, and Alaska.
