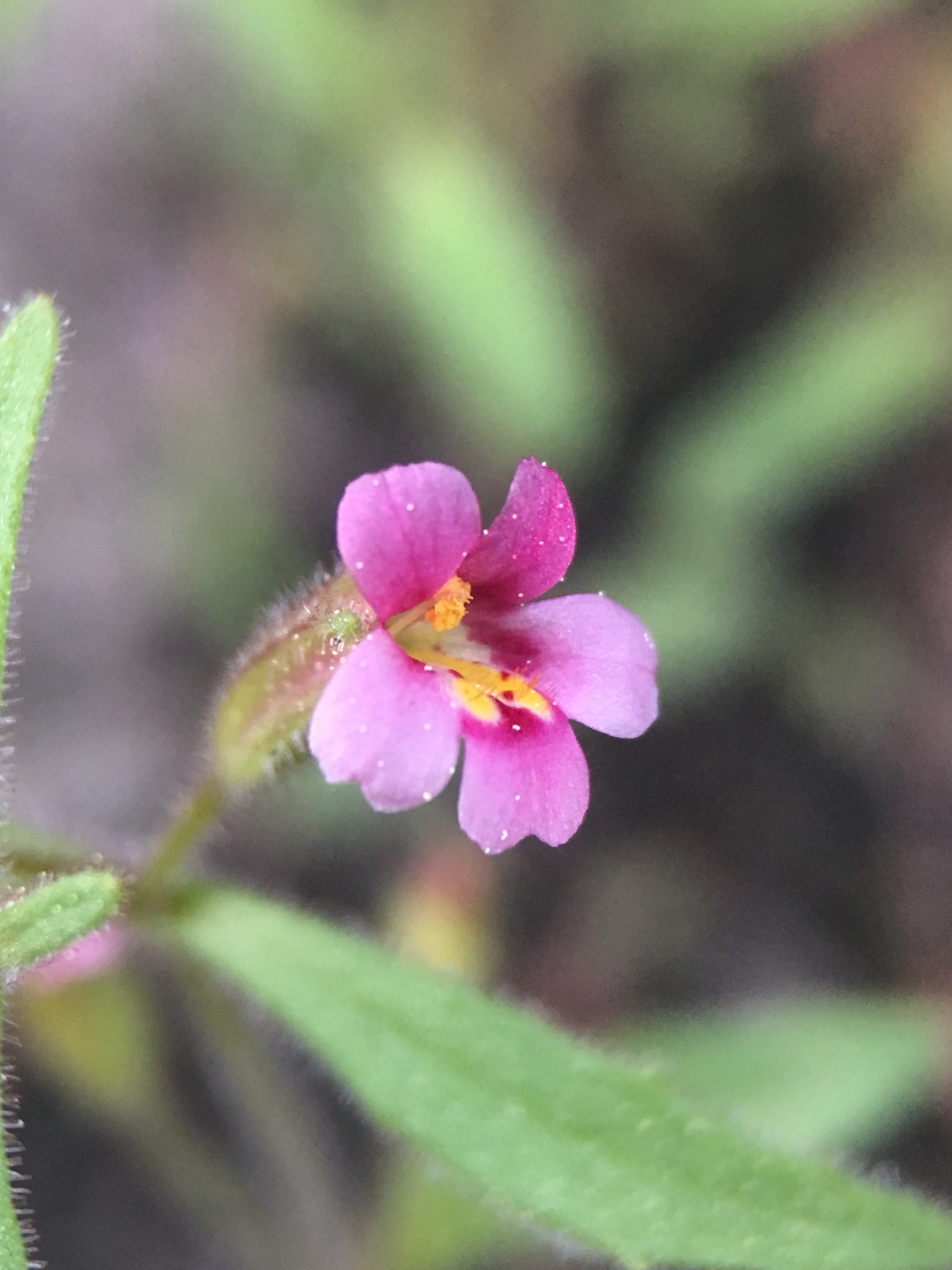
- El Dorado County, California, 2019

Conservation status
- Secure (NatureServe)

Scientific classification
- Kingdom: Plantae
- Clade: Embryophytes
- Clade: Tracheophytes
- Clade: Angiosperms
- Clade: Eudicots
- Clade: Asterids
- Order: Lamiales
- Family: Phrymaceae
- Genus: Erythranthe
- Species: E. breweri

Binomial name
- Erythranthe breweri (Greene) G.L.Nesom & N.S.Fraga

Synonyms
- Eunanus breweri Greene; Mimulus breweri (Greene) Coville; Mimulus rubellus var. breweri (Greene) Jeps.

= Erythranthe breweri =

Species of flowering plant

Erythranthe breweri is a species of monkeyflower known by the common name Brewer's monkeyflower. It is native to western North America from British Columbia to California to Colorado, where it grows in moist spots in several habitat types. This is a hairy annual herb producing a thin, erect stem up to 21 centimeters tall. The herbage is reddish green in color. The paired opposite leaves are linear in shape and up to 3.5 centimeters long. The plant bears small tubular flowers, each with its base encapsulated in a lightly hairy calyx of sepals with tiny equal lobes at its mouth. The five-lobed flower corolla is just a few millimeters long and light purplish pink in color, often with darker spots in the throat. It was formerly known as Mimulus breweri.
