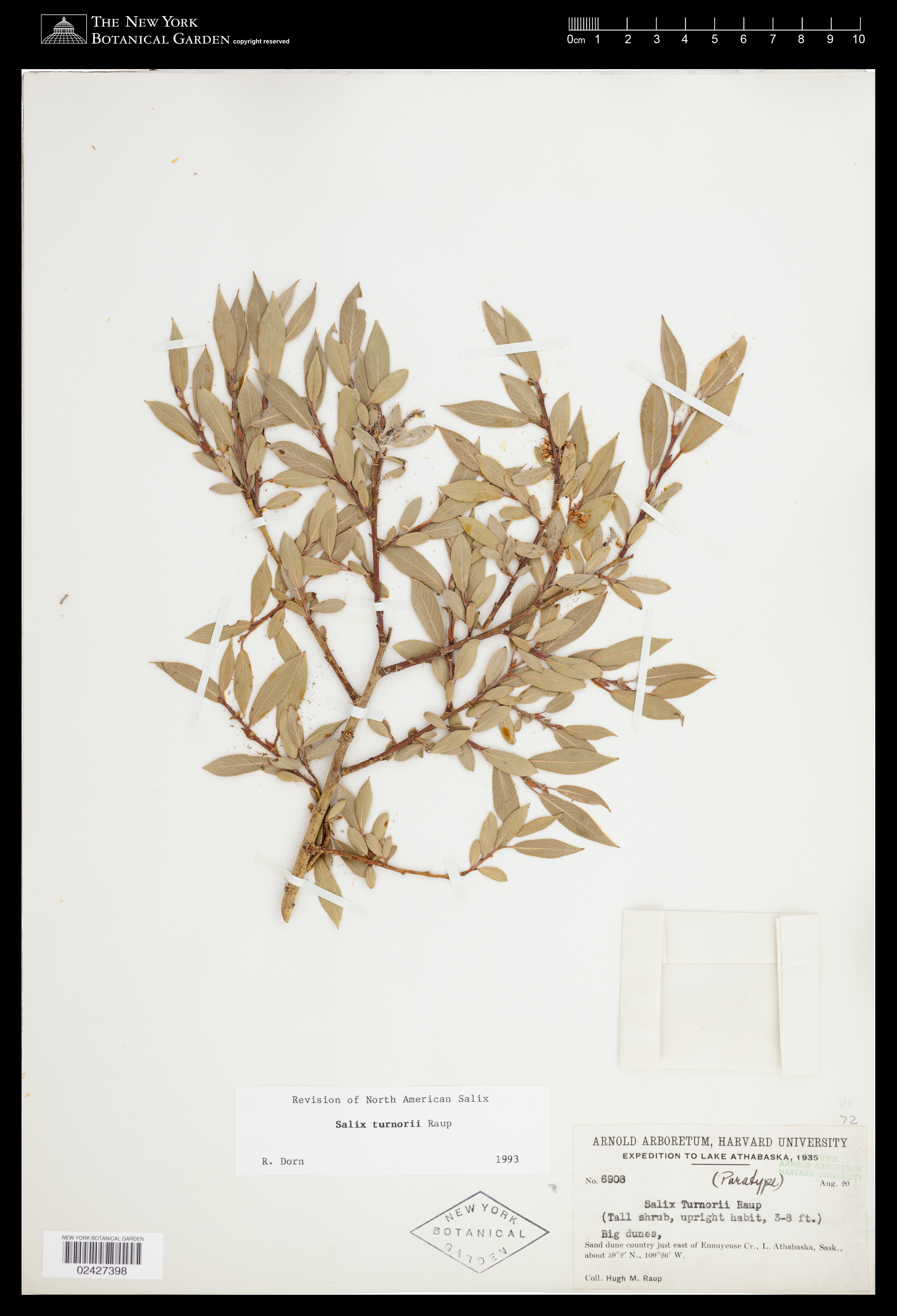

Scientific classification
- Kingdom: Plantae
- Clade: Tracheophytes
- Clade: Angiosperms
- Clade: Eudicots
- Clade: Rosids
- Order: Malpighiales
- Family: Salicaceae
- Genus: Salix
- Species: S. turnorii

Binomial name
- Salix turnorii Raup

= Salix turnorii =

Species of plant

Salix turnorii, also known as Turnor's willow, is a species of willow. It is endemic to the Athabasca Sand Dunes Provincial Park in Saskatchewan, Canada. It is listed as imperiled by NatureServe.
