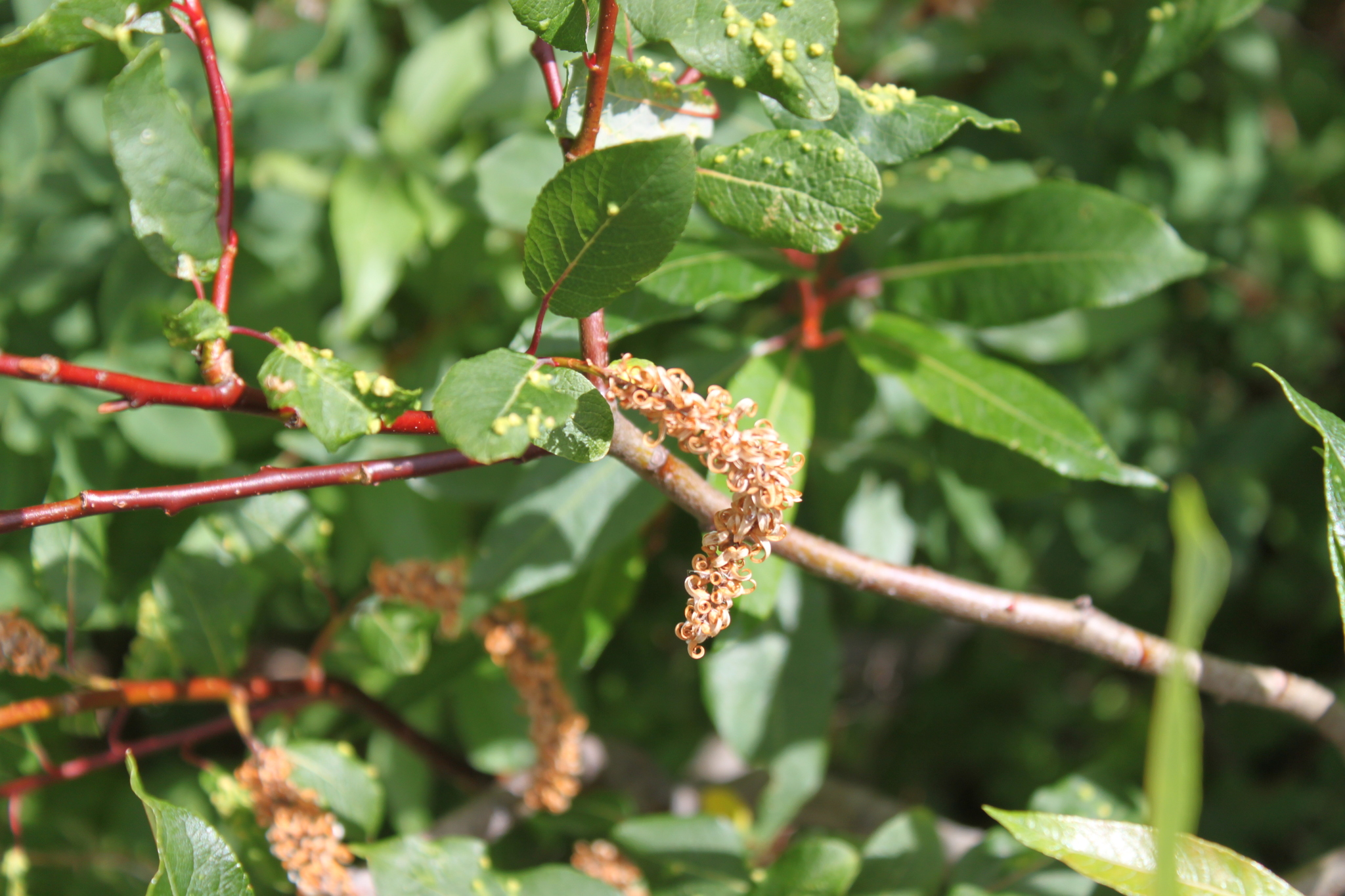
- In Québec
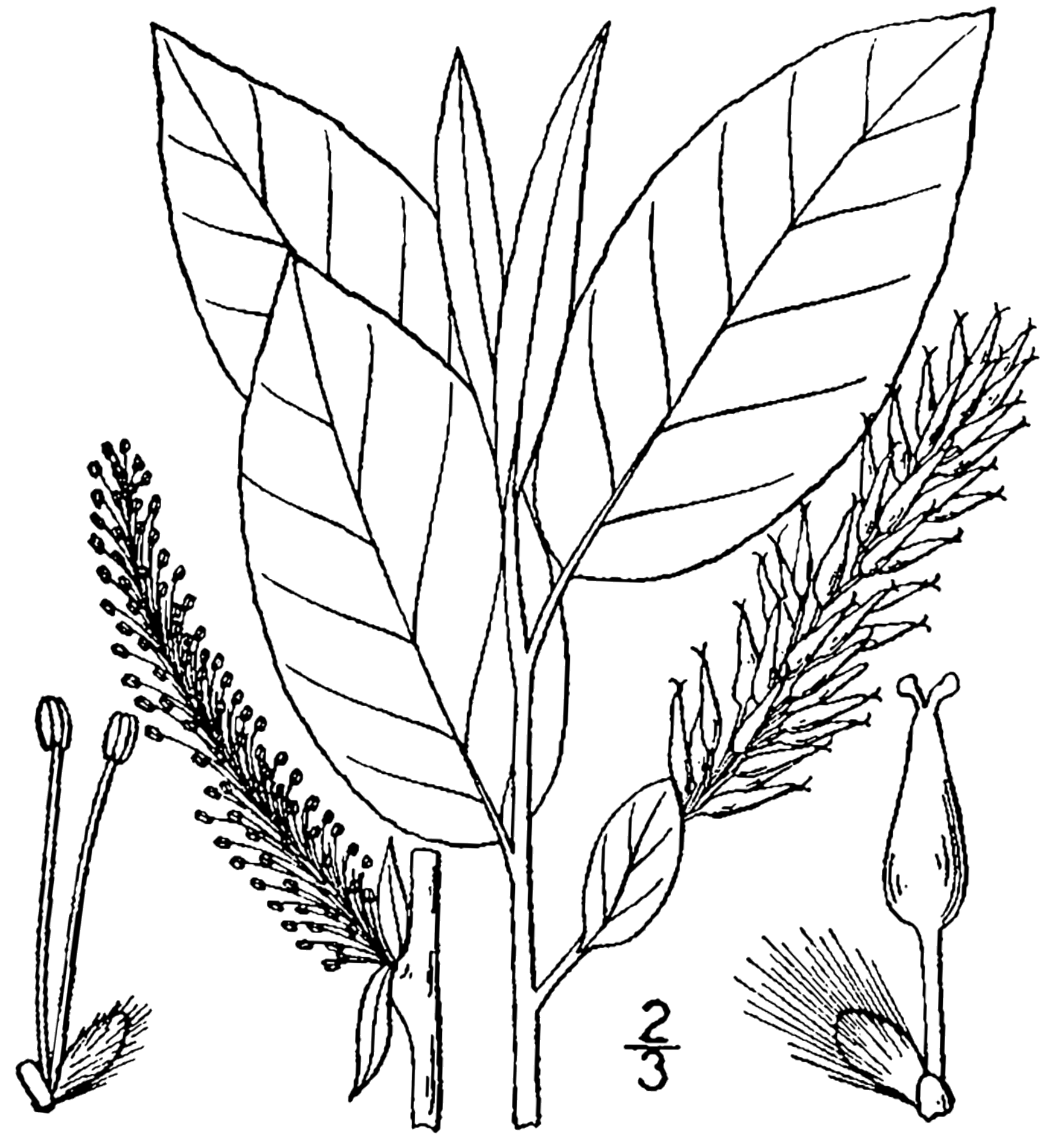
- Botanical illustration

Conservation status
- Least Concern (IUCN 3.1)

Scientific classification
- Kingdom: Plantae
- Clade: Tracheophytes
- Clade: Angiosperms
- Clade: Eudicots
- Clade: Rosids
- Order: Malpighiales
- Family: Salicaceae
- Genus: Salix
- Species: S. pyrifolia

Binomial name
- Salix pyrifolia Andersson
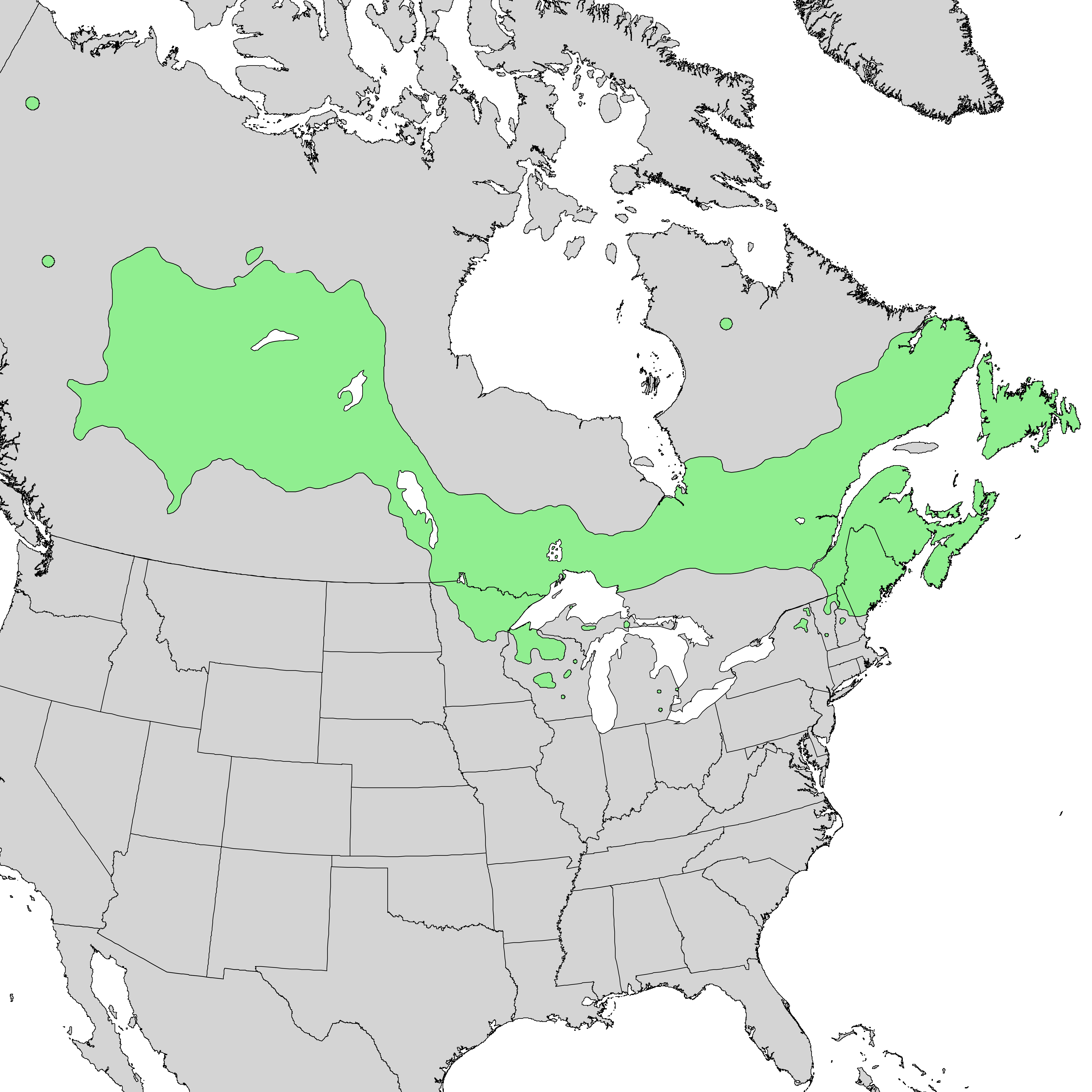

Synonyms
- List: Salix balsamifera Barratt ex Andersson; Salix balsamifera var. alpestris Bebb; Salix balsamifera var. lanceolata Bebb; Salix balsamifera var. typica Bebb; Salix balsamifera var. vegeta Bebb; Salix columbiae A.Nelson & J.F.Macbr.; Salix cordata var. balsamifera Hook.; Salix pyrifolia var. laeta Andersson; Salix pyrifolia var. lanceolata (Bebb) Fernald

= Salix pyrifolia =

Species of plant in the willow family

Salix pyrifolia (syn. Salix balsamifera), the balsam willow, is a species of flowering plant in the family Salicaceae, native to Canada, and the north-central to northeastern United States. A shrub, its leaves emit a balsam-like fragrance. It is available from commercial suppliers.
