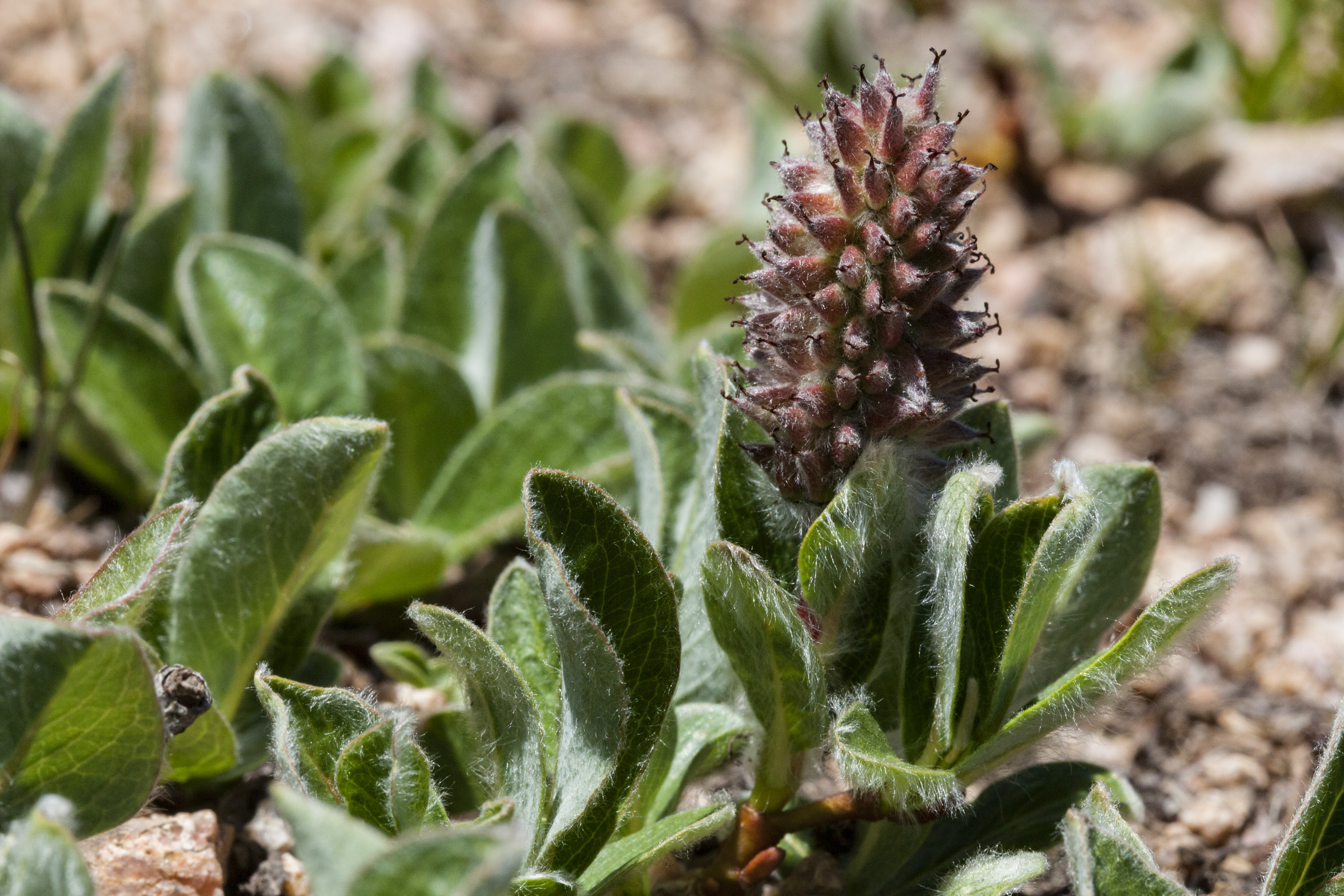

Scientific classification
- Kingdom: Plantae
- Clade: Tracheophytes
- Clade: Angiosperms
- Clade: Eudicots
- Clade: Rosids
- Order: Malpighiales
- Family: Salicaceae
- Genus: Salix
- Species: S. petrophila

Binomial name
- Salix petrophila Rydb.

= Salix petrophila =

Species of shrub

Salix petrophila, commonly known as alpine willow and Rocky Mountain willow, is a Northwest American mountain shrub in the willow family (Salicaceae).

== Habitat and range ==
It can be found in the subalpine zone and alpine zone of the Sierra Nevada range in wetlands such as moist banks and wet meadows, up to 9,900 to 13,000 feet (3,000 to 4,000 m).

== Growth pattern ==
It is often overlooked because although sprawling and mat-forming, it is very small for a shrub, growing to only 4 inches (0.10 m) tall.

== Leaves and stems ==
Leaves are 3/4 to 1 3/4 inches (0.019 to 0.044 m) long, elliptic, with soft hairs on the surface when young. The other mat forming Sierra Nevada alpine willow, Salix nivalis, has smaller leaves (1/4 to 7/8 inch (0.0064 to 0.0222 m) that are hairless when young.

== Inflorescence and fruit ==
Each plant has either all male or all female flowers, with an inflorescence that is a dense, upright catkin, growing to 2 inches (0.051 m).

== Ecological interactions ==
It is pollinated by ants, as are some other willows.
