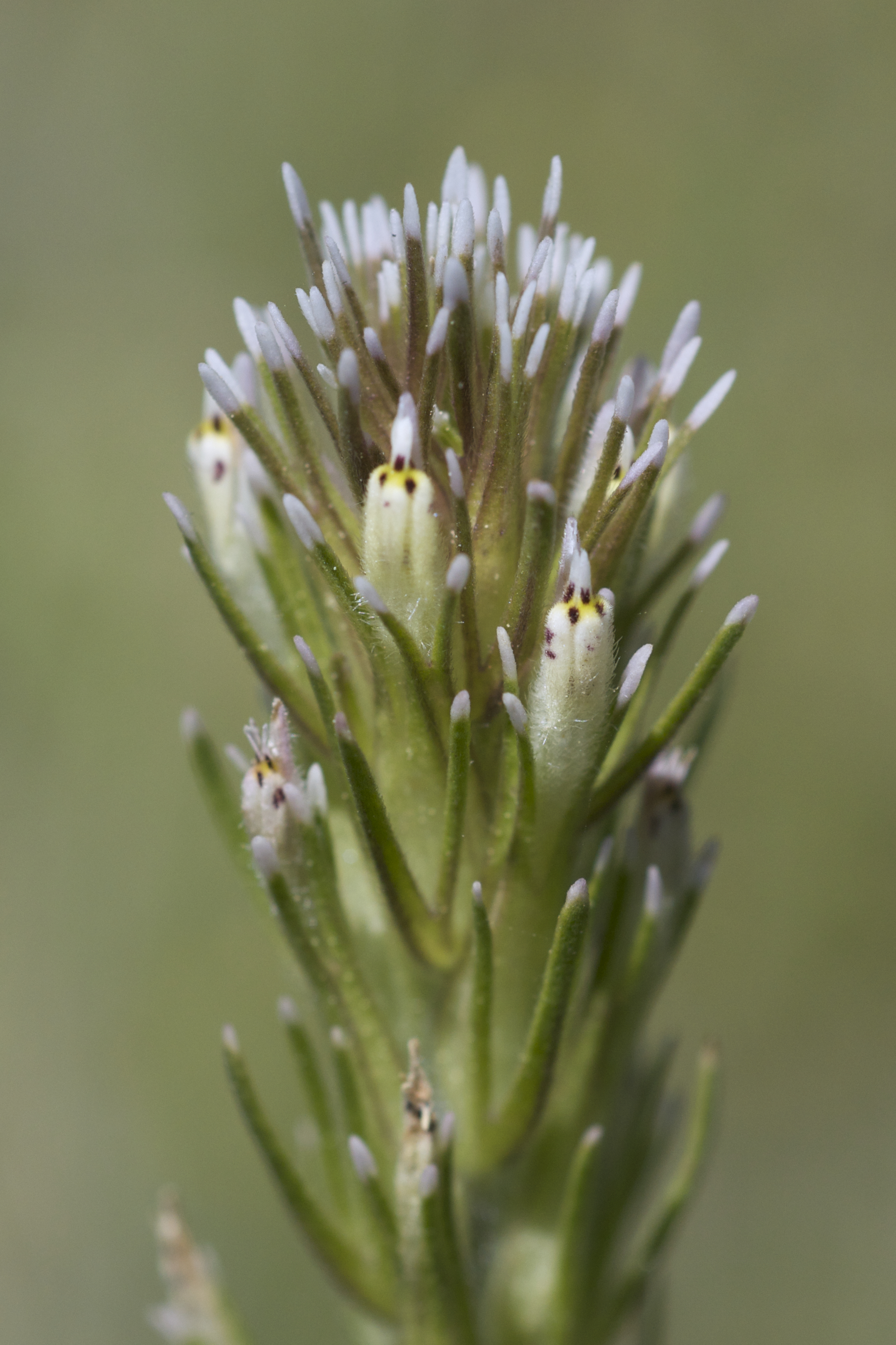

Conservation status
- Secure (NatureServe)

Scientific classification
- Kingdom: Plantae
- Clade: Embryophytes
- Clade: Tracheophytes
- Clade: Spermatophytes
- Clade: Angiosperms
- Clade: Eudicots
- Clade: Asterids
- Order: Lamiales
- Family: Orobanchaceae
- Genus: Castilleja
- Species: C. attenuata

Binomial name
- Castilleja attenuata (A.Gray) T.I.Chuang & Heckard

= Castilleja attenuata =

Species of flowering plant

Castilleja attenuata is a species of Indian paintbrush, known by the common names valley tassels, attenuate Indian paintbrush, and narrowleaf Owl's-clover. It is native to western North America from British Columbia, through California, to Baja California, where it grows in grasslands and open woodland habitats.

== Description ==
Castilleja attenuata is an annual herb growing up to about 50 centimeters tall. The leaves are linear in shape and several centimeters long. The inflorescence has three-lobed bracts with yellow or white tips. Between the bracts emerge fuzzy white flowers dotted with purple and yellow. The bloom period is between the months of March to May. The elevations this species has been found at are between 0 and 6595 ft, or 0 to 2010 meters. The annual precipitation for this plant is between 11 and 69 inches or 28 to 175 centimeters. The growing season is between two and nine months long. It is a host for two butterflies, the Leanira Checkerspot (Chlosyne leanira) and the Chalcedon Checkerspot (Euphydryas chalcedona).
