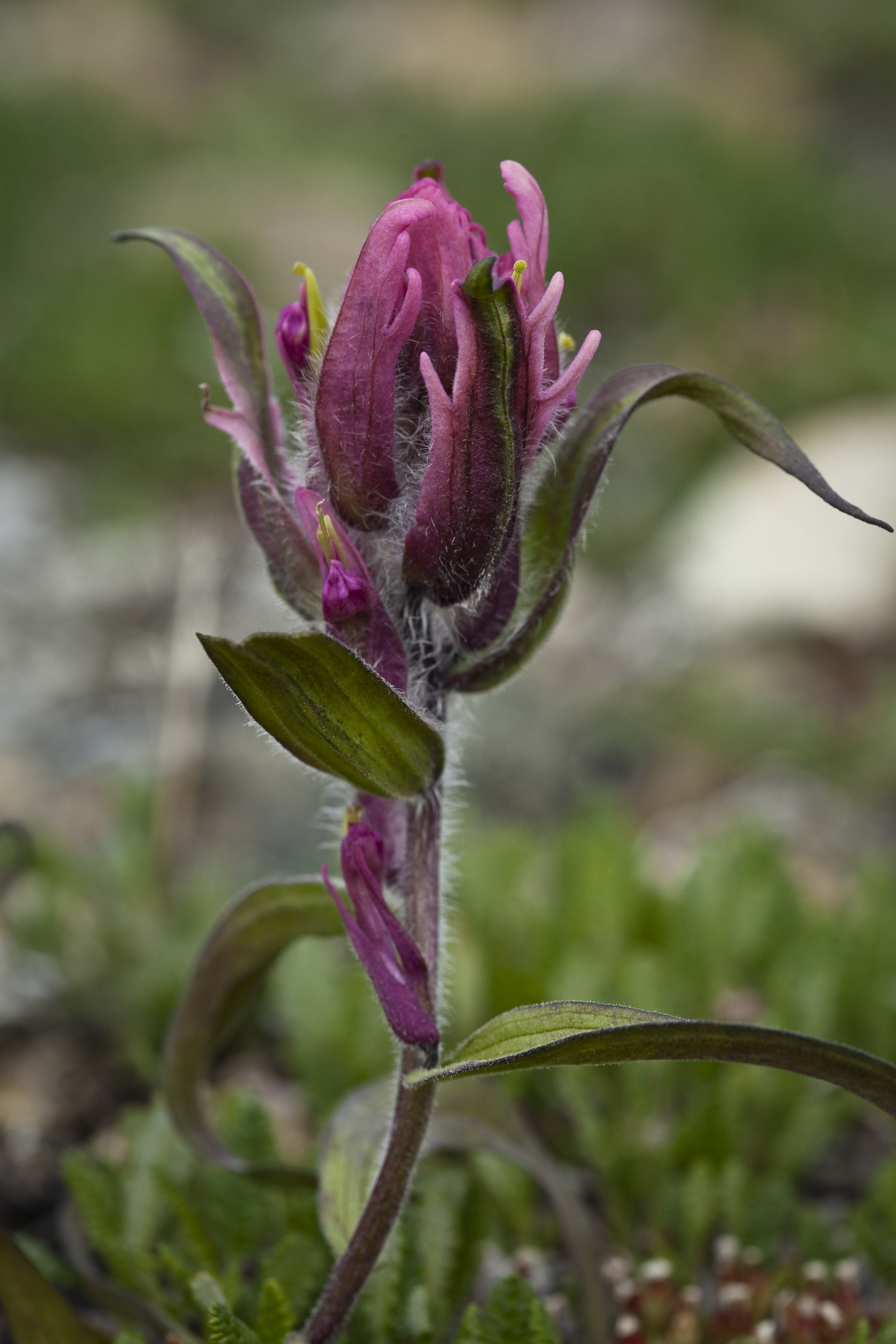

Scientific classification
- Kingdom: Plantae
- Clade: Tracheophytes
- Clade: Angiosperms
- Clade: Eudicots
- Clade: Asterids
- Order: Lamiales
- Family: Orobanchaceae
- Genus: Castilleja
- Species: C. elegans

Binomial name
- Castilleja elegans Malte, 1934

= Castilleja elegans =

Species of flowering plant

Castilleja elegans, the elegant Indian paintbrush, is a herbaceous plant species in the genus Castilleja found in Canada.
