= Sphagnum affine =

Imbricate bogmoss

Scientific classification
- Kingdom: Plantae
- Division: Bryophyta
- Class: Sphagnopsida
- Order: Sphagnales
- Family: Sphagnaceae
- Genus: Sphagnum
- Species: S. affine

Binomial name
- Sphagnum affine Renauld & Cardot

Species of moss

Sphagnum affine, the imbricate bogmoss, is a species of peat moss or sphagnum moss which is exploited to make commercial peat products.

== Characteristics ==
This moss type varies significantly in size and colour, but is otherwise regular in appearance. It often formulates as hommocks, carpets or cushions. It can typically occur as ochreous in colour.

== Habitat ==
Sphagnum affine is found in base-rich environment such as fens, marshes, ditches and flished bogs. It can occasionally appear in very wet sites.
