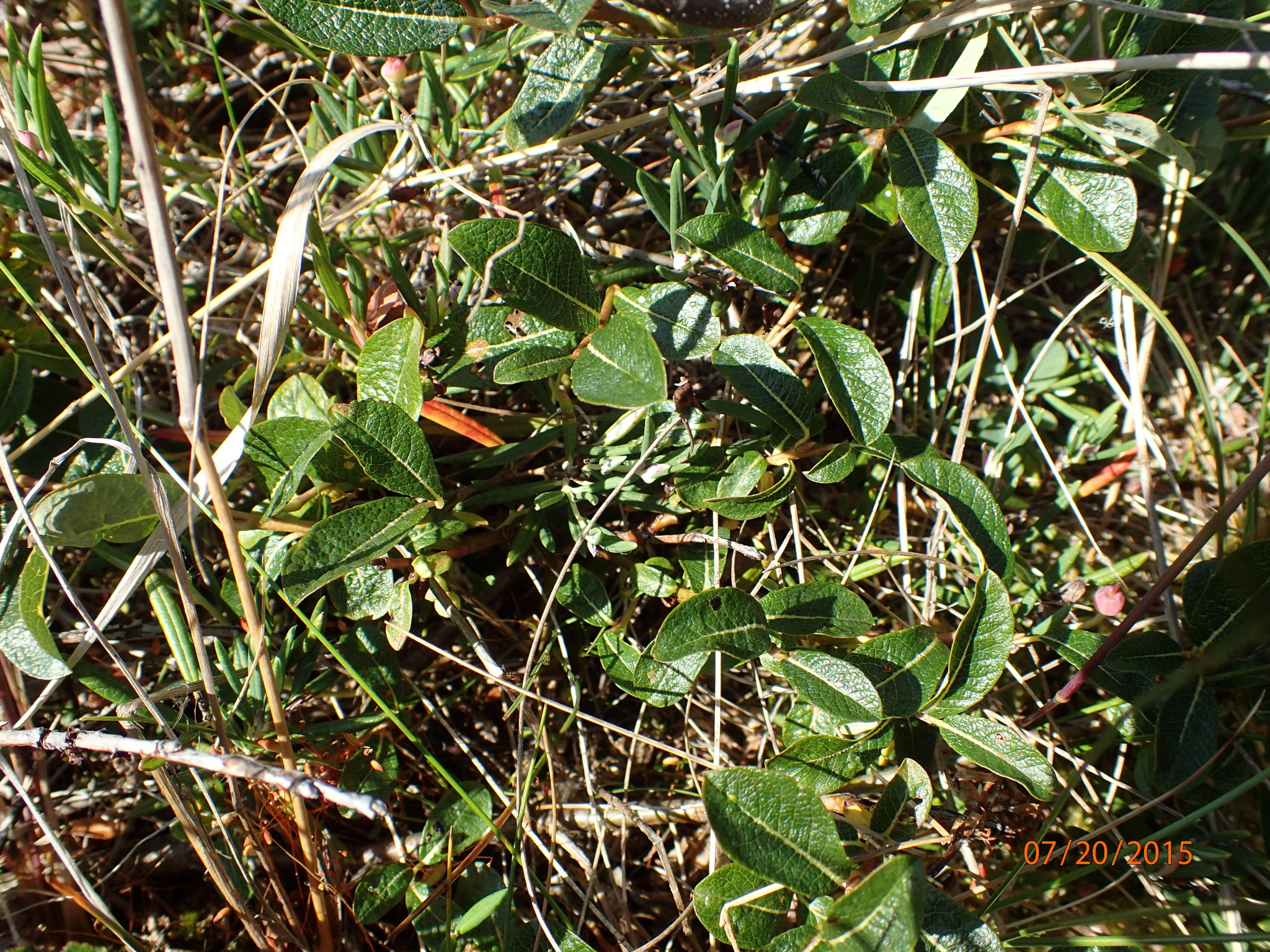

Conservation status
- Secure (NatureServe)

Scientific classification
- Kingdom: Plantae
- Clade: Tracheophytes
- Clade: Angiosperms
- Clade: Eudicots
- Clade: Rosids
- Order: Malpighiales
- Family: Salicaceae
- Genus: Salix
- Species: S. fuscescens

Binomial name
- Salix fuscescens Anderss.

Synonyms
- Salix arbutifolia

= Salix fuscescens =

Species of flowering plant

Salix fuscescens is a species of flowering plant in the willow family known by the common name Alaska bog willow. It is native to northern North America, where it occurs throughout much of Alaska and across northern Canada. It is also present in Eurasia.

This plant is a squat deciduous shrub growing up to 30 cm (1 ft) to 55 cm (1.8 ft) tall. Sometimes it remains under 15 cm (6 in) high. The species is dioecious, with male and female flowers occurring on separate individuals. The inflorescences are catkins up to 38 mm (1.5 in) long. The fruit is a two-valved capsule that releases tiny, downy seeds.

This plant grows in spruce-fir ecosystems, such as coniferous bogs. It can be found on tundra, in swamps, and on riverbanks. It often occurs with many other species of willows.
