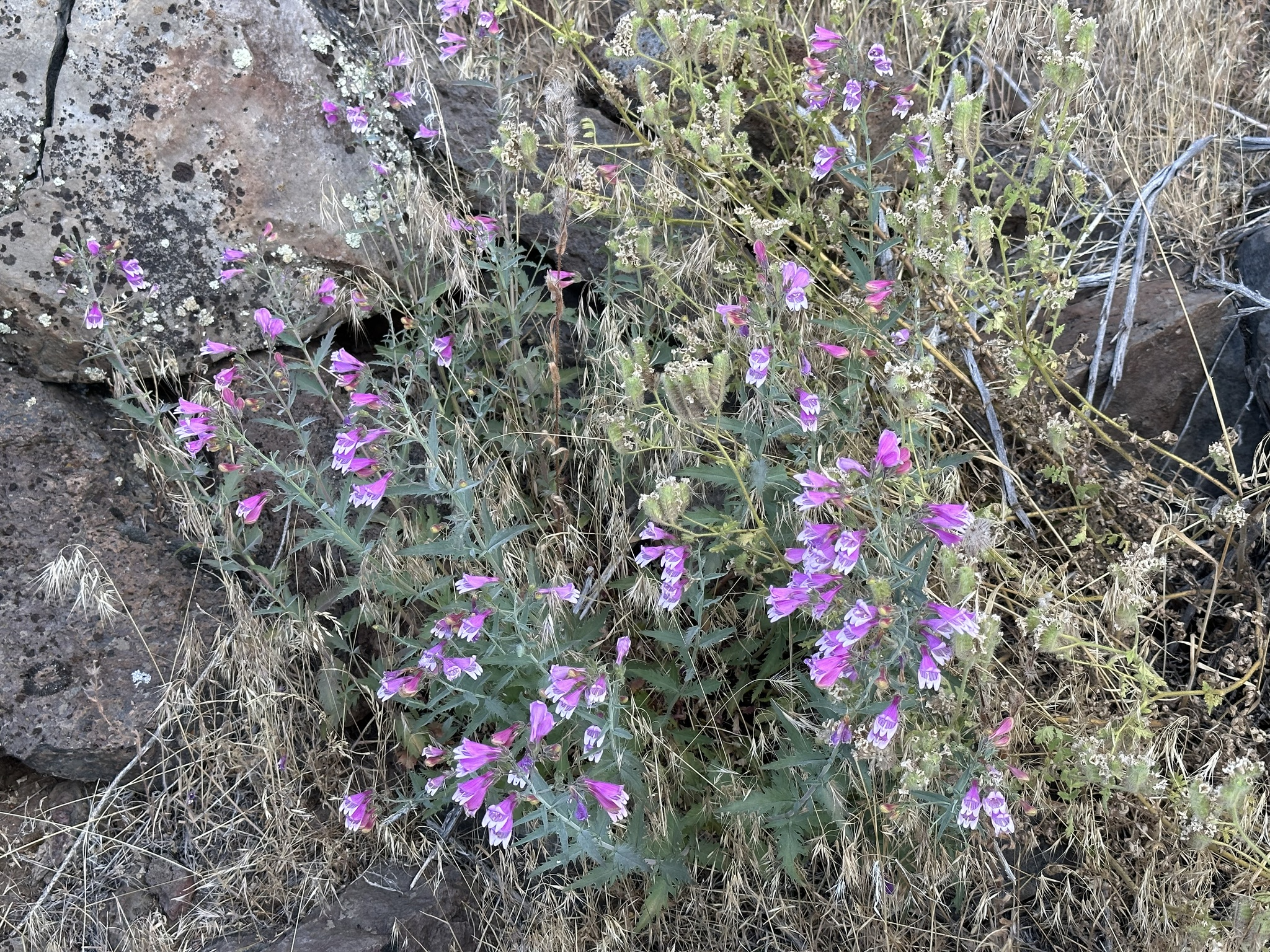

Scientific classification
- Kingdom: Plantae
- Clade: Tracheophytes
- Clade: Angiosperms
- Clade: Eudicots
- Clade: Asterids
- Order: Lamiales
- Family: Plantaginaceae
- Genus: Penstemon
- Species: P. richardsonii

Binomial name
- Penstemon richardsonii Douglas ex Lindl.

= Penstemon richardsonii =

Species of plant

Penstemon richardsonii is a species of flowering plant in the plantain family; its common name is cutleaf beardtongue or Richardson's beardtongue. It is native to the US states of Washington, Oregon and the Canadian province British Columbia.

== Description ==
Penstemon richardsonii is a perennial that is often shrubby at the base and has several slender flowering stems that are 20 to 80 cm tall. The leaves are in opposite pairs borne on the flowering stem, are sessile (no petiole) except near the base, and are sharply serrate-dentate to irregularly pinnatifid and up to 7 cm long and 3 cm wide.

The inflorescence is a panicle bearing showy bright lavender to purplish red tubular flowers. The flower bract (calyx) is ovate to lanceolate and 4 to 8 mm long with 5 green or purplish segments that are glandular-hairy and pointed at their tip. The tubular corolla is glandular-hairy on the outside and 22 to 32 mm long and has two lips, the upper lip with two lobes cleft nearly half its length and the lower lip with three lobes. As in all Penstemon species, the corolla is formed from fused petals. Inside the corolla are prominent darker red-purple nectar guide lines and the staminode often has a short beard near the tip.

== Range and habitat ==
Penstemon richardsonii is found on the east side of the Cascade Mountain crest in Oregon, Washington, and southern British Columbia. It usually grows in rock crevices and other dry rocky places below 1200 m elevation.

== Taxonomy ==
Penstemon richardsonii contains the following varieties:

- Penstemon richardsonii var. dentatus
- Penstemon richardsonii var. curtiflorus
- Penstemon richardsonii var. richardsonii

== Gallery ==
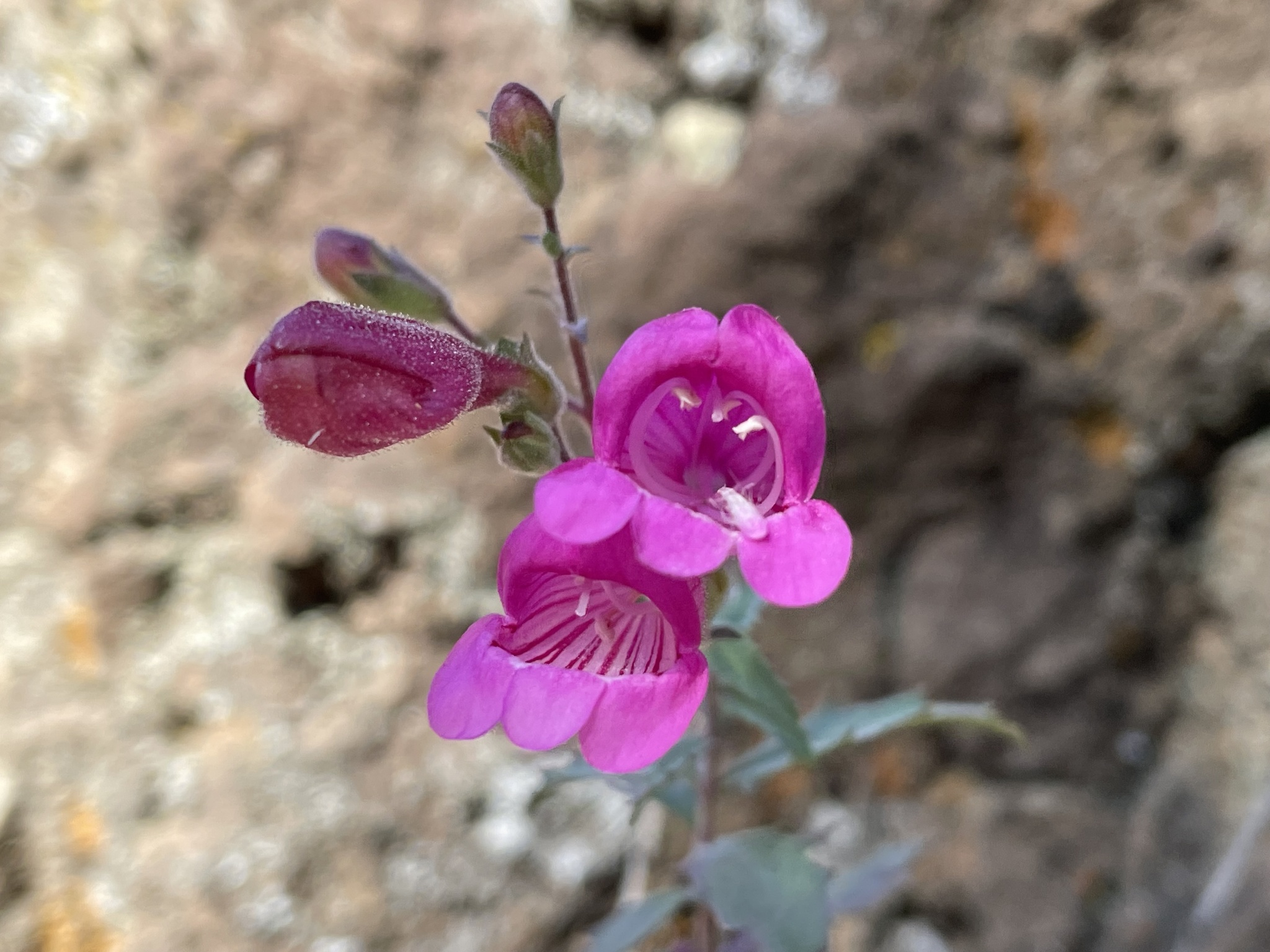
Flower

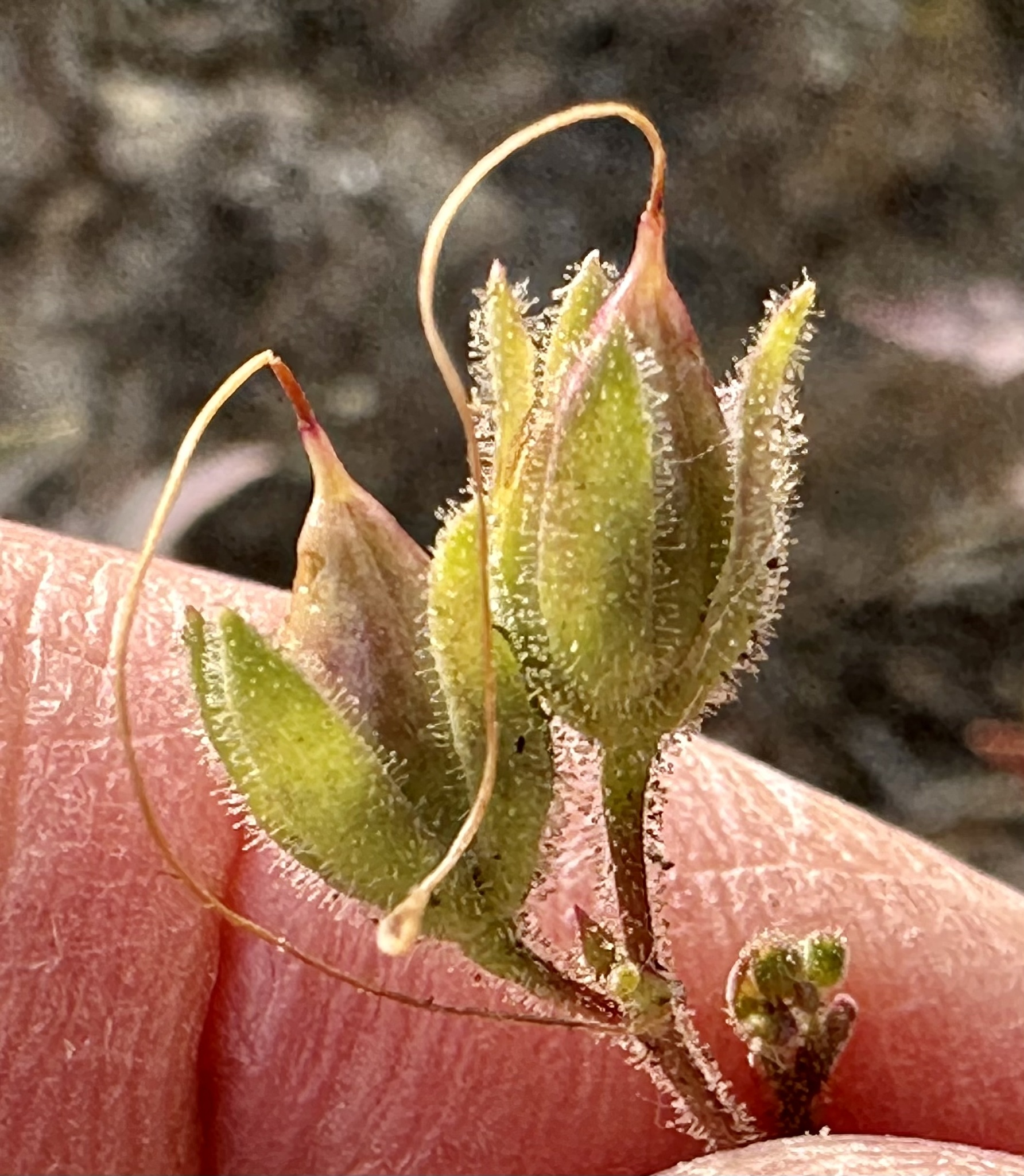
Fruit

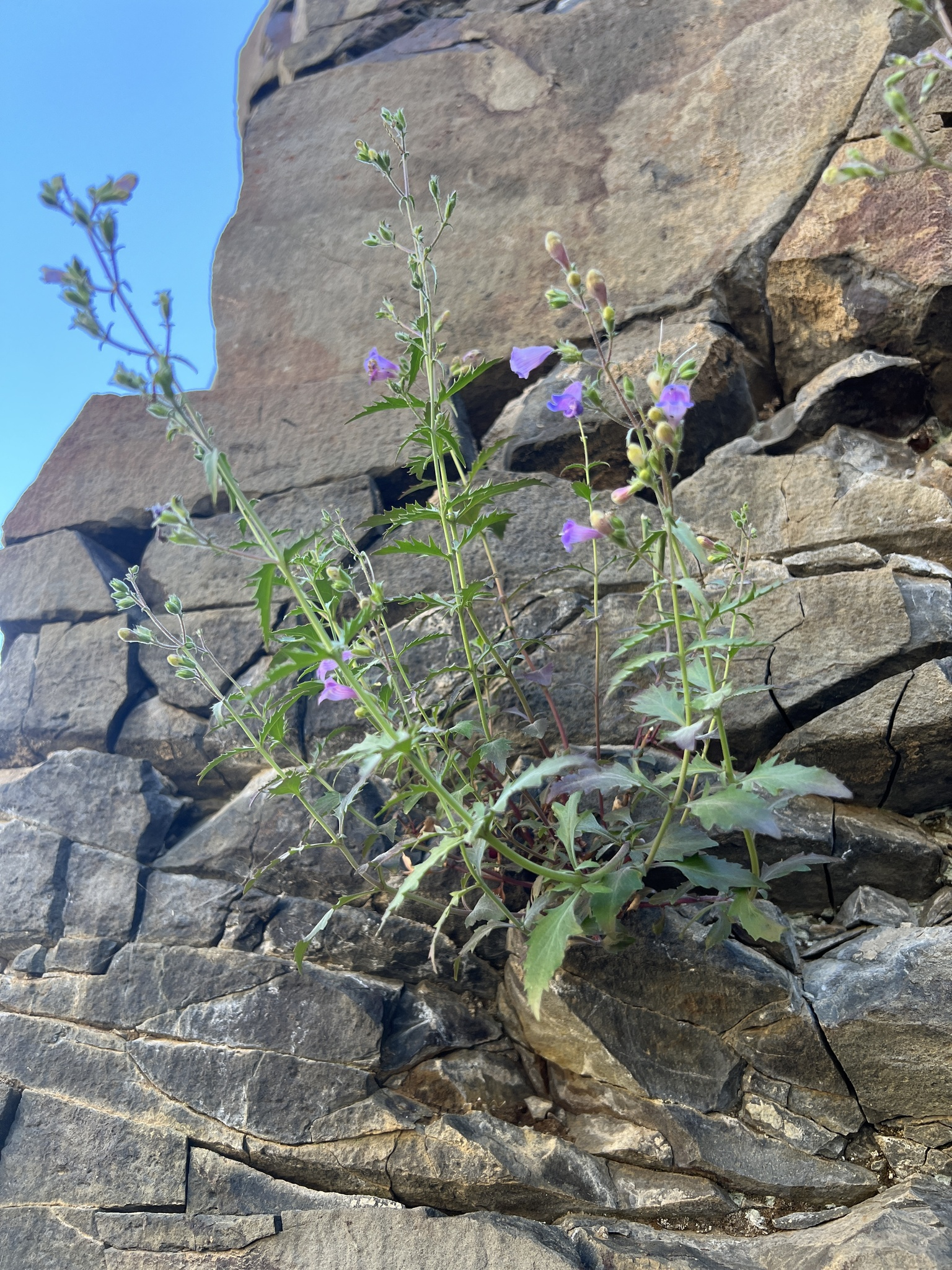
Typical habitat
