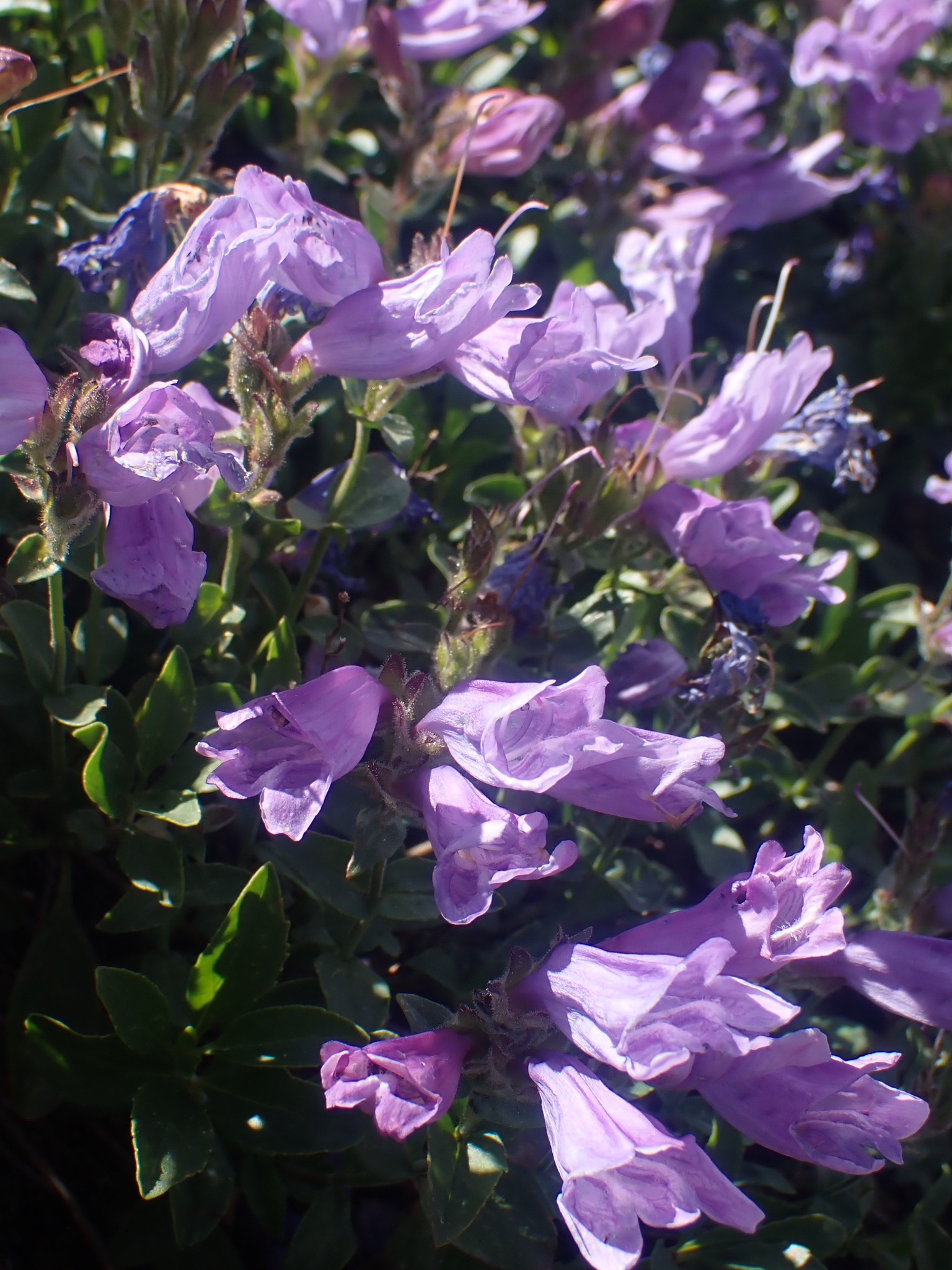

Conservation status
- Apparently Secure (NatureServe)

Scientific classification
- Kingdom: Plantae
- Clade: Tracheophytes
- Clade: Angiosperms
- Clade: Eudicots
- Clade: Asterids
- Order: Lamiales
- Family: Plantaginaceae
- Genus: Penstemon
- Species: P. ellipticus

Binomial name
- Penstemon ellipticus J.M.Coult. & Fisher

Synonyms
- Penstemon davidsonii var. ellipticus

= Penstemon ellipticus =

Plant species in the veronica family

Penstemon ellipticus, commonly called rocky ledge penstemon, is a species of penstemon from the Rocky Mountains in the northwest US and western Canada.

== Description ==
Is a somewhat low growing plant with stems that creep or spread. They Individual stems will grow upwards to a height of 5 to 18 centimeters (2 to 7 in) and are covered in hairs that might be backwards pointing. It has flowers that are violet to purple and hairless externally.

== Taxonomy ==
Penstemon ellipticus was scientifically described and named by John Merle Coulter and Elmon McLean Fisher in 1893. It is classified in the Penstemon genus within the family Plantaginaceae. It has no varieties, but was descived as a variety of Penstemon davidsonii in 1966 by Joseph Robert Bernard Boivin.

=== Names ===
The species name, ellipticus, means "elliptical" in Botanical Latin because of the shape of the leaves. Penstemon ellipticus is known by the common names rocky ledge penstemon or rocky ledge beardtongue. It is also called elliptic-leaved penstemon.

== Range and habitat ==
Rocky ledge penstemon is native to the northwestern US states of Washington, Idaho, and Montana as well as the western Canadian provinces of Alberta and British Columbia. There it grows in the Canadian Rockies, Columbia Mountains, and the northern parts of the Rocky Mountains in the United States. It is found at elevations of 900–2,700 meters (3,000–8,900 ft).

It grows in rocky areas such as on cliffs, rock fields, ledges, and outcrops.
