= Sphagnum aongstroemii =

Conservation status
- Secure (NatureServe)

Scientific classification
- Kingdom: Plantae
- Division: Bryophyta
- Class: Sphagnopsida
- Order: Sphagnales
- Family: Sphagnaceae
- Genus: Sphagnum
- Species: S. aongstroemii

Binomial name
- Sphagnum aongstroemii C.Hartm.

Synonyms

Species of plant

Sphagnum aongstroemii is a species of moss in the family Sphagnaceae, known by the common name Aongstroem's peatmoss.

Sphagnum aongstroemii is found throughout the Arctic region. The moss has been recorded from Norway to northern Japan and North Korea in Eurasia. In North America, S. aongstroemii is found throughout Alaska and northern Canada, with an apparent affinity to the western regions.
