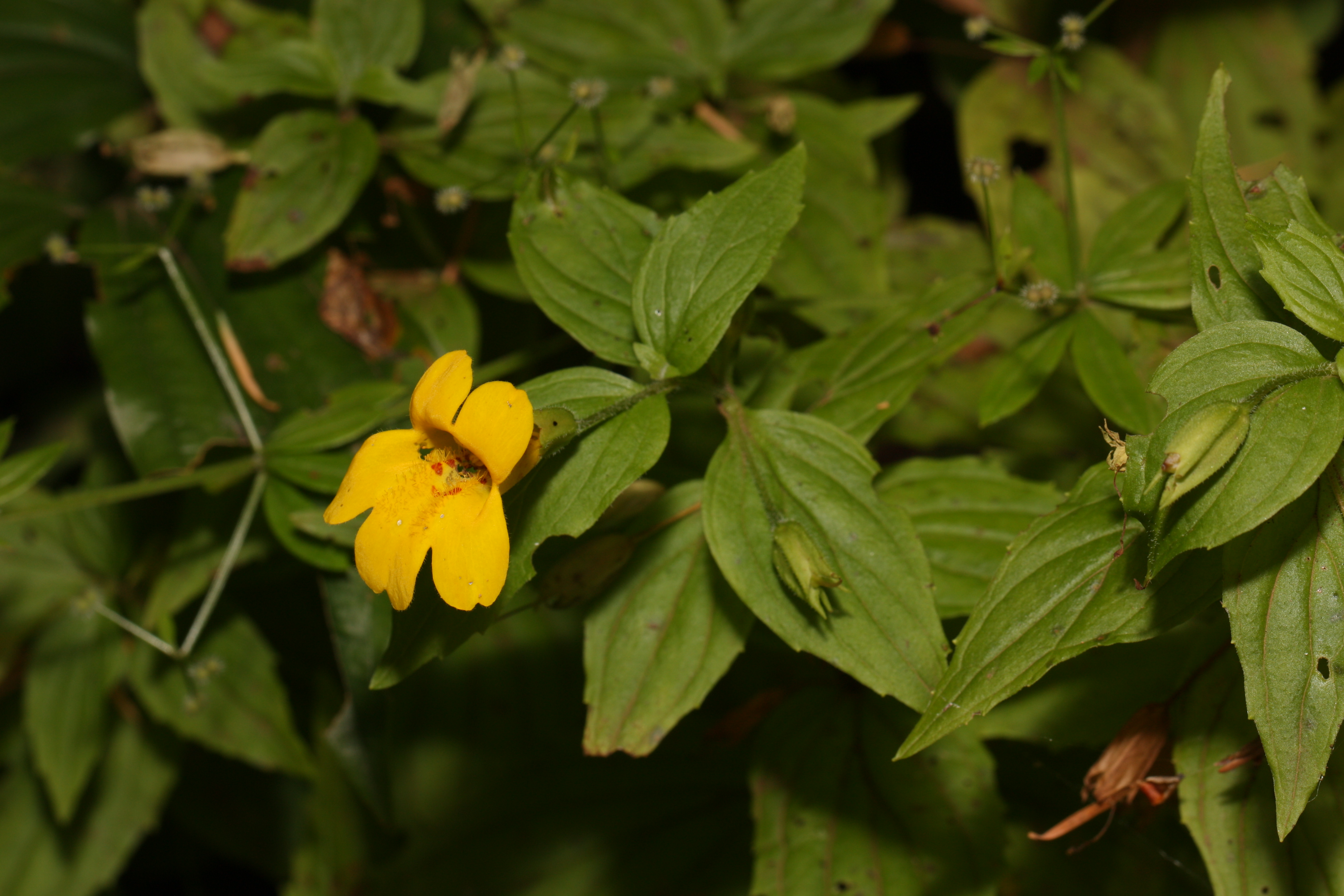
- Erythranthe dentata in Saddle Mountain State Natural Area, Washington (state)

Conservation status
- Least Concern (IUCN 3.1)

- Secure (NatureServe)

Scientific classification
- Kingdom: Plantae
- Clade: Embryophytes
- Clade: Tracheophytes
- Clade: Angiosperms
- Clade: Eudicots
- Clade: Asterids
- Order: Lamiales
- Family: Phrymaceae
- Genus: Erythranthe
- Species: E. dentata

Binomial name
- Erythranthe dentata (Nutt. ex Benth.) G.L.Nesom

Synonyms
- Mimulus dentatus Nutt. ex Benth.

= Erythranthe dentata =

Species of flowering plant

Erythranthe dentata is a species of monkeyflower known by the common names coastal monkeyflower and toothleaf monkeyflower. It is native to the western coast of North America from British Columbia to northern California, where it grows in moist habitat. It was formerly known as Mimulus dentatus.

== Description ==
It is a hairy rhizomatous perennial herb producing an upright stem up to about 40 centimeters tall. The veined oval leaves are up to about 7 centimeters long and oppositely arranged about the stem. The tubular base of the flower is encapsulated in a ribbed calyx of sepals with pointed lobes at its mouth. The funnel-shaped yellow corolla is up to 4 centimeters long with a wide mouth divided into two lobes on the upper lip and three on the lower.
