= Salix cascadensis =

Scientific classification
- Kingdom: Plantae
- Clade: Embryophytes
- Clade: Tracheophytes
- Clade: Spermatophytes
- Clade: Angiosperms
- Clade: Eudicots
- Clade: Rosids
- Order: Malpighiales
- Family: Salicaceae
- Genus: Salix
- Species: S. cascadensis

Binomial name
- Salix cascadensis Cockerell

Synonyms
- Salix brownii var. tenera M.E.Jones; Salix cascadensis var. thompsonii Brayshaw; Salix tenera Andersson

Species of flowering plant

Salix cascadensis, the Cascade willow, is a species of flowering plant in the family Salicaceae, sparsely distributed in British Columbia in Canada and the states of Washington, Wyoming, Colorado, and Utah in the United States. It is a petite shrub with stems that emerge from underground branches.
