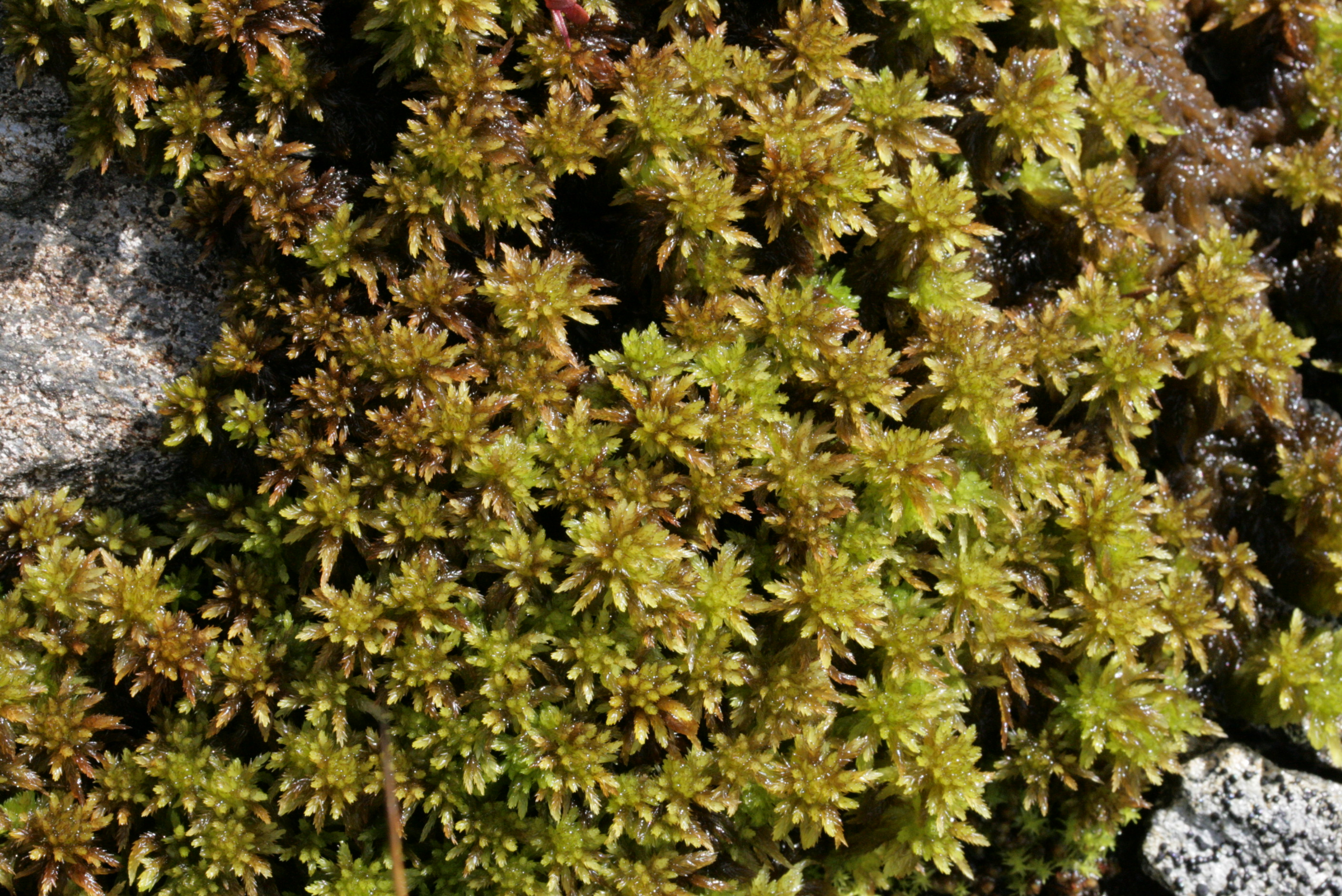

Scientific classification
- Kingdom: Plantae
- Division: Bryophyta
- Class: Sphagnopsida
- Order: Sphagnales
- Family: Sphagnaceae
- Genus: Sphagnum
- Species: S. inundatum

Binomial name
- Sphagnum inundatum Russow, 1894

= Sphagnum inundatum =

Species of moss

Sphagnum inundatum is a species of moss belonging to the family Sphagnaceae.

It has cosmopolitan distribution.
