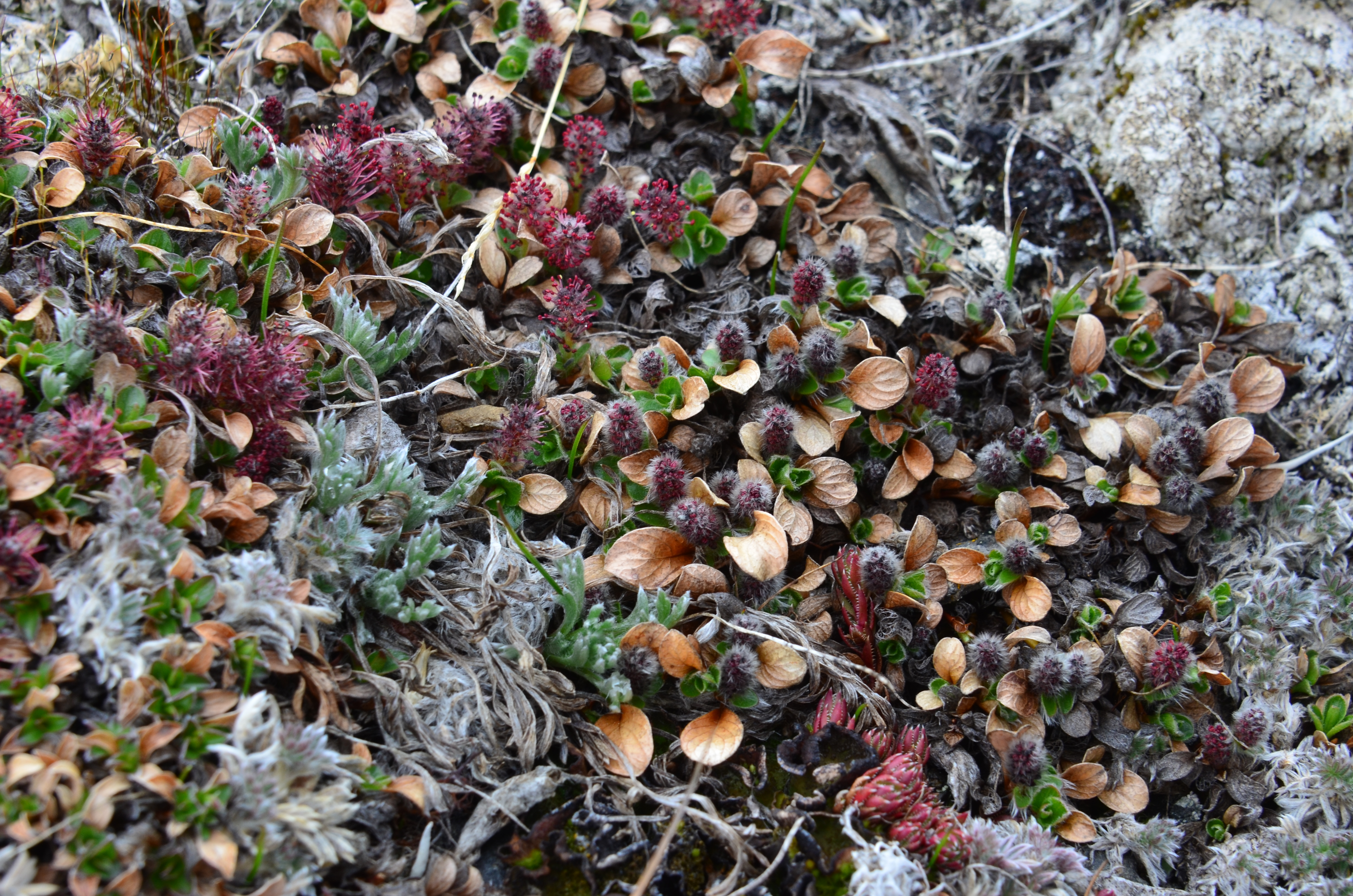
- Habit
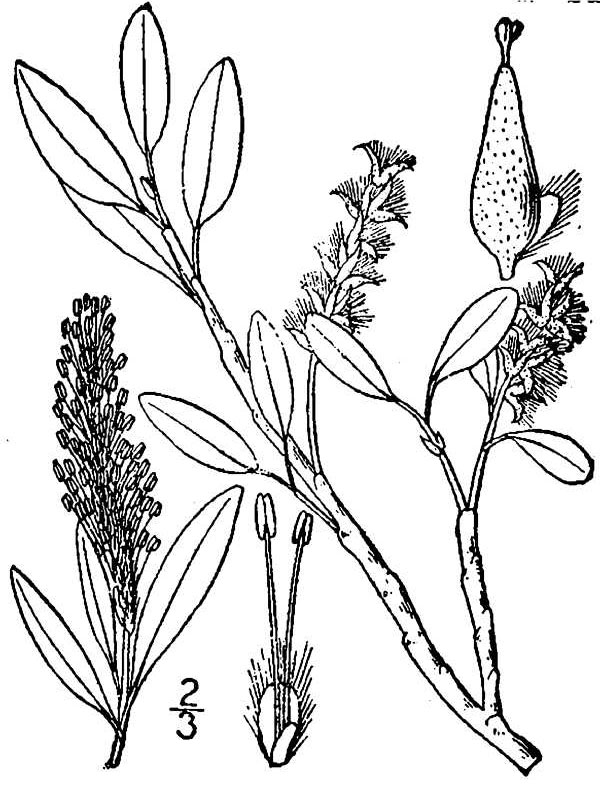
- Botanical illustration

Scientific classification
- Kingdom: Plantae
- Clade: Tracheophytes
- Clade: Angiosperms
- Clade: Eudicots
- Clade: Rosids
- Order: Malpighiales
- Family: Salicaceae
- Genus: Salix
- Species: S. phlebophylla

Binomial name
- Salix phlebophylla Andersson

Synonyms
- Salix buxifolia Trevir. ex Andersson; Salix buxifolia Trautv.; Salix retusa Hook.

= Salix phlebophylla =

Species of flowering plant

Salix phlebophylla, the skeletonleaf willow or skeleton-leaf willow, is a species of flowering plant in the family Salicaceae, with an amphi-Beringian distribution. A prostrate shrub reaching at most 1.5 in (4 cm), its tiny leaves persist on the plant until only the withered brown veins remain.
