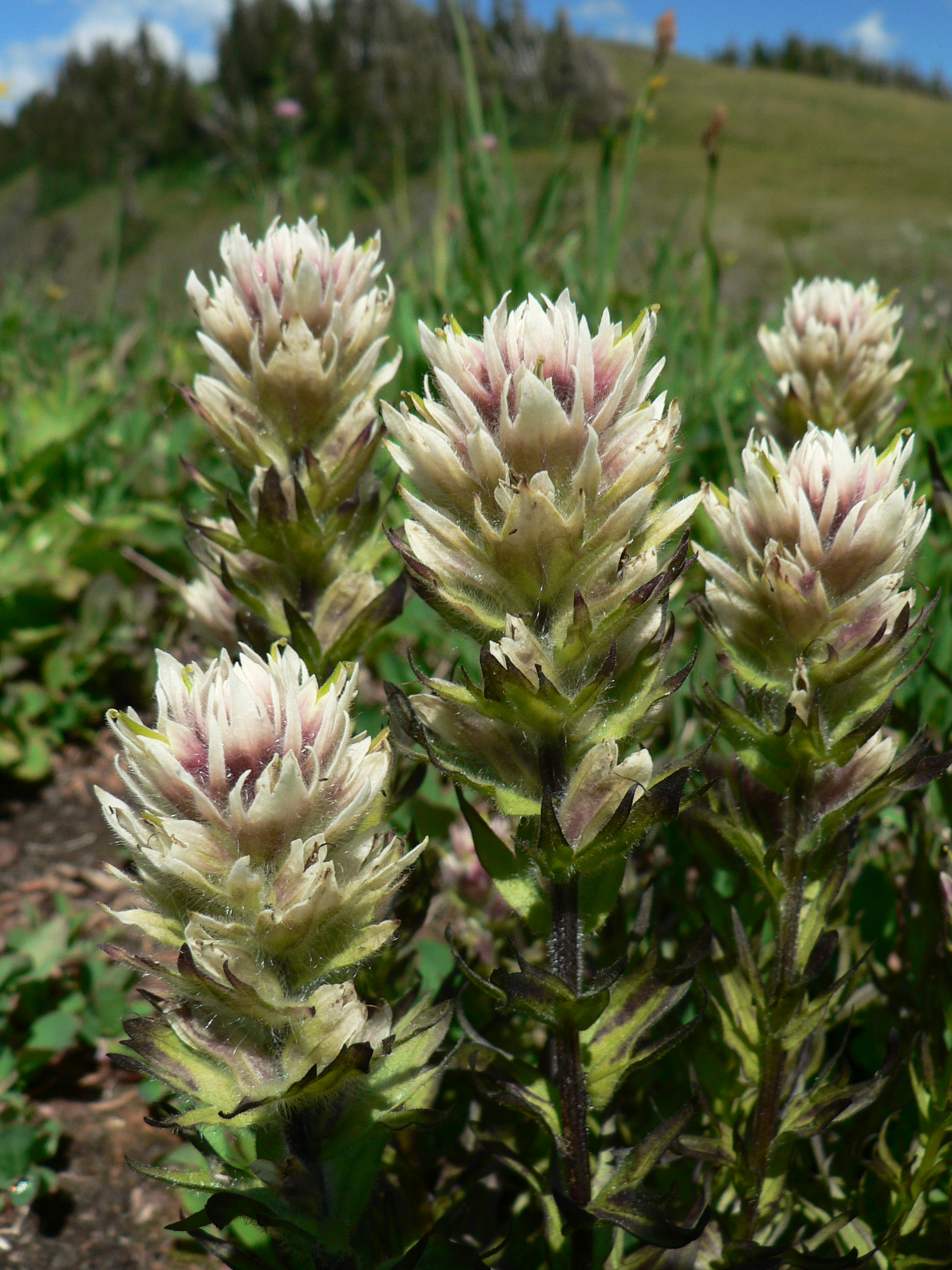
- var. albida in the Mount Baker Wilderness

Scientific classification
- Kingdom: Plantae
- Clade: Tracheophytes
- Clade: Angiosperms
- Clade: Eudicots
- Clade: Asterids
- Order: Lamiales
- Family: Orobanchaceae
- Genus: Castilleja
- Species: C. parviflora

Binomial name
- Castilleja parviflora Bong.

= Castilleja parviflora =

Species of flowering plant

Castilleja parviflora is a species of Indian paintbrush known by the common name mountain Indian paintbrush. It is native to western North America from Alaska to California, where it grows in high mountain habitat, including areas of alpine climate.

== Description ==
This wildflower is a perennial herb up to about 40 centimeters tall and coated in glandular and nonglandular hairs. The leaves are a few centimeters long and lance-shaped to oblong. The inflorescence is made up of layers of bracts tipped in shades of pale yellow to bright red or pink. Between the bracts emerge the yellow-green, sometimes red-tinted, tubular flowers. Flowers bloom June to September. Its habitats include gravels, talus slopes, and subalpine and alpine meadows.

=== Varieties ===
There are several varieties of Castilleja parviflora:

- C. p. var. albida - limited to British Columbia and Washington
- C. p. var. olympica (Olympic Indian paintbrush) - limited to British Columbia and Washington
- C. p. var. oreopola (Henry Indian paintbrush) - distributed from British Columbia to Oregon
- C. p. var. parviflora - known from Alaska to California
