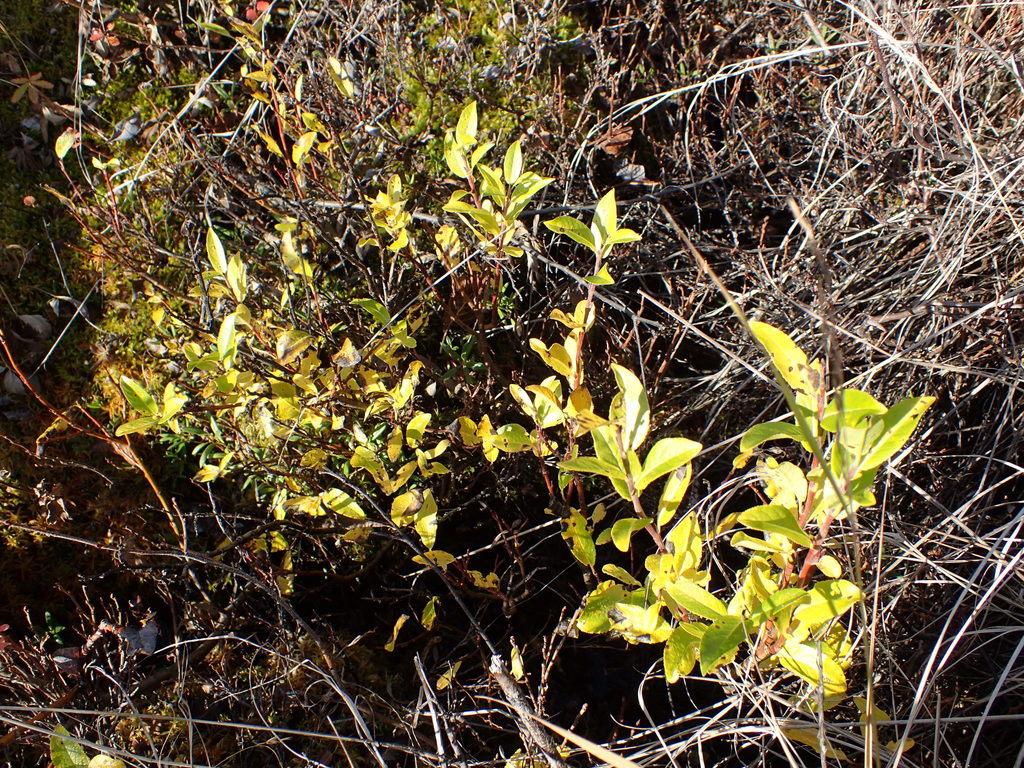

Conservation status
- Least Concern (IUCN 3.1)

Scientific classification
- Kingdom: Plantae
- Clade: Tracheophytes
- Clade: Angiosperms
- Clade: Eudicots
- Clade: Rosids
- Order: Malpighiales
- Family: Salicaceae
- Genus: Salix
- Species: S. myrtillifolia

Binomial name
- Salix myrtillifolia Andersson

Synonyms
- Salix lingulata Salix pseudocordata

= Salix myrtillifolia =

Species of flowering plant

Salix myrtillifolia is a species of flowering plant in the willow family known by the common name blueberry willow. It is native to northern North America, where it occurs in Alaska and much of Canada.

This willow is a shrub with two growth varieties. Low blueberry willow (S. m. var. myrtillifolia) is a small shrub under 60 cm (24 in) tall. Tall blueberry willow is a larger shrub which grows upright and reaches a maximum height near 3 m (10 ft). The plant is dioecious, with male and female reproductive structures on separate individuals. The inflorescence is a catkin up to 5 cm (2 in) long.

This plant grows in coniferous forests in alpine climates. The smaller variety grows in swampy areas such as black spruce muskegs. Tall blueberry willow often occupies riparian habitat, forming thickets along waterways. It is common along the Tanana and Yukon Rivers. It grows alongside many other willow species. It is a pioneer species, colonizing areas covered in recently deposited alluvium, such as floodplains recently scoured by flood waters.
