= Populus × berolinensis =

- Leaves
- Avenue in Lithuania

Scientific classification
- Kingdom: Plantae
- Clade: Tracheophytes
- Clade: Angiosperms
- Clade: Eudicots
- Clade: Rosids
- Order: Malpighiales
- Family: Salicaceae
- Genus: Populus
- Species: P. × berolinensis

Binomial name
- Populus × berolinensis K.Koch

Synonyms
- Populus × berolinensis var. irtyschensis (Chang Y.Yang) C.Shang; Populus × hybrida berolinensis Schröd. ex Regel; Populus × irtyschensis Chang Y.Yang

Nothospecies of plant

Populus × berolinensis, the Berlin poplar, is a naturally occurring hybrid species of flowering plant in the family Salicaceae. Its parents are Populus laurifolia (laurel poplar) and P. nigra f. italica (Lombardy poplar), and it is found in Xinjiang where the parent species' ranges overlap. Crosses have been made by plant nurseries over the years, leading to a number of widely planted ornamental cultivars. A fast growing deciduous tree reaching 25 m (82 ft), it is hardy down to USDA Zone 3.
