= Sphagnum macrophyllum =

Sphagnum macrophyllusm

Scientific classification
- Kingdom: Plantae
- Division: Bryophyta
- Class: Sphagnopsida
- Subclass: Sphagnidae
- Order: Sphagnales
- Family: Sphagnaceae
- Genus: Sphagnum
- Species: S. macrophyllum

Binomial name
- Sphagnum macrophyllum Bridel

Synonyms
- Isocladus macrophyllus (Bridel) Lindberg; Sphagnum macrophyllum var. burinense W. S. G. Maas

Species of moss

Sphagnum macrophyllum, the largeleaf sphagnum, is a species of peat moss native to southern and eastern North America. It is known from every state from Texas to New Jersey as well as New York, and the Canadian provinces of Nova Scotia and Newfoundland. It can be found floating on lakes and ponds.

Sphagnum macrophyllum has fronds that are dark brown to almost black. Leaves are lanceolate, tapering at the tip.
