= Wijkia carlottae =

Scientific classification
- Kingdom: Plantae
- Division: Bryophyta
- Class: Bryopsida
- Subclass: Bryidae
- Order: Hypnales
- Family: Pylaisiadelphaceae
- Genus: Wijkia
- Species: W. carlottae

Binomial name
- Wijkia carlottae (W.B. Schofield) H.A. Crum

Species of plant

Wijkia carlottae, or Carlott's wijkia moss, is a species of moss of the family Pylaisiadelphaceae and genus Wijkia. It is endemic to the Haida Gwaii archipelago in British Columbia, Canada. It occurs in a number of different habitats, but only 10 occurrences are known. It is possibly threatened by logging and it currently classified as vulnerable by NatureServe.
