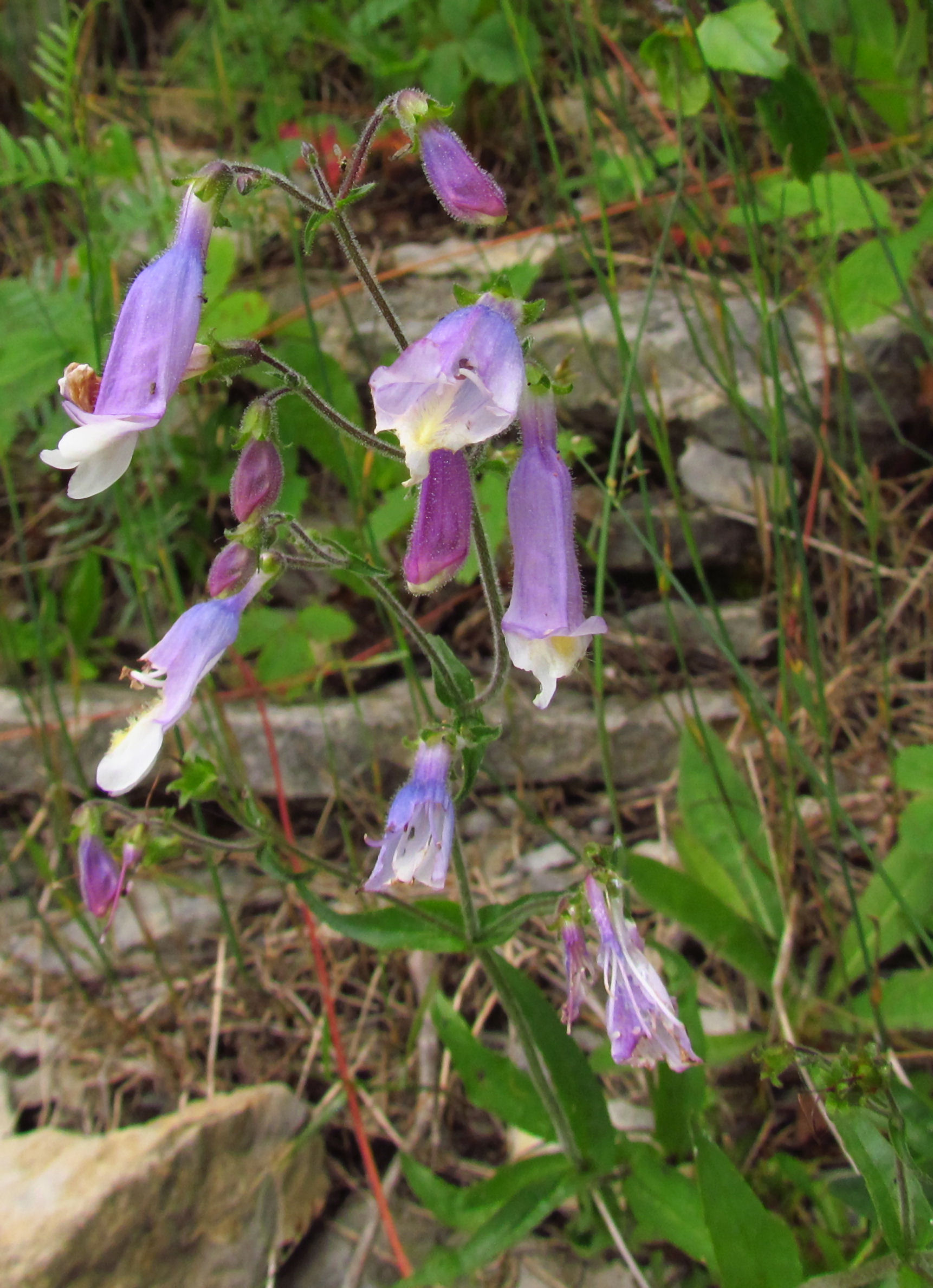

Conservation status
- Apparently Secure (NatureServe)

Scientific classification
- Kingdom: Plantae
- Clade: Tracheophytes
- Clade: Angiosperms
- Clade: Eudicots
- Clade: Asterids
- Order: Lamiales
- Family: Plantaginaceae
- Genus: Penstemon
- Species: P. hirsutus

Binomial name
- Penstemon hirsutus (L.) Willd.

= Penstemon hirsutus =

Species of flowering plant

Penstemon hirsutus is a species of flowering plant in the plantain family known by the common name hairy beard-tongue. It is native to southern Quebec and Ontario, as well as the eastern United States including Wisconsin, Michigan, Ohio, Indiana, Illinois, Kentucky, Tennessee, West Virginia, Virginia, Maryland, Delaware, New York, New Jersey, Rhode Island, Pennsylvania, Connecticut, Massachusetts, Vermont, New Hampshire, and Maine.

This perennial species has hairy stems up to 90 centimetres tall, hence its species name, hirsutus. The leaves are opposite, stalkless, and lancelate.

This species of Penstemon is found in dry alvars, prairies, savannas, and old fields.
