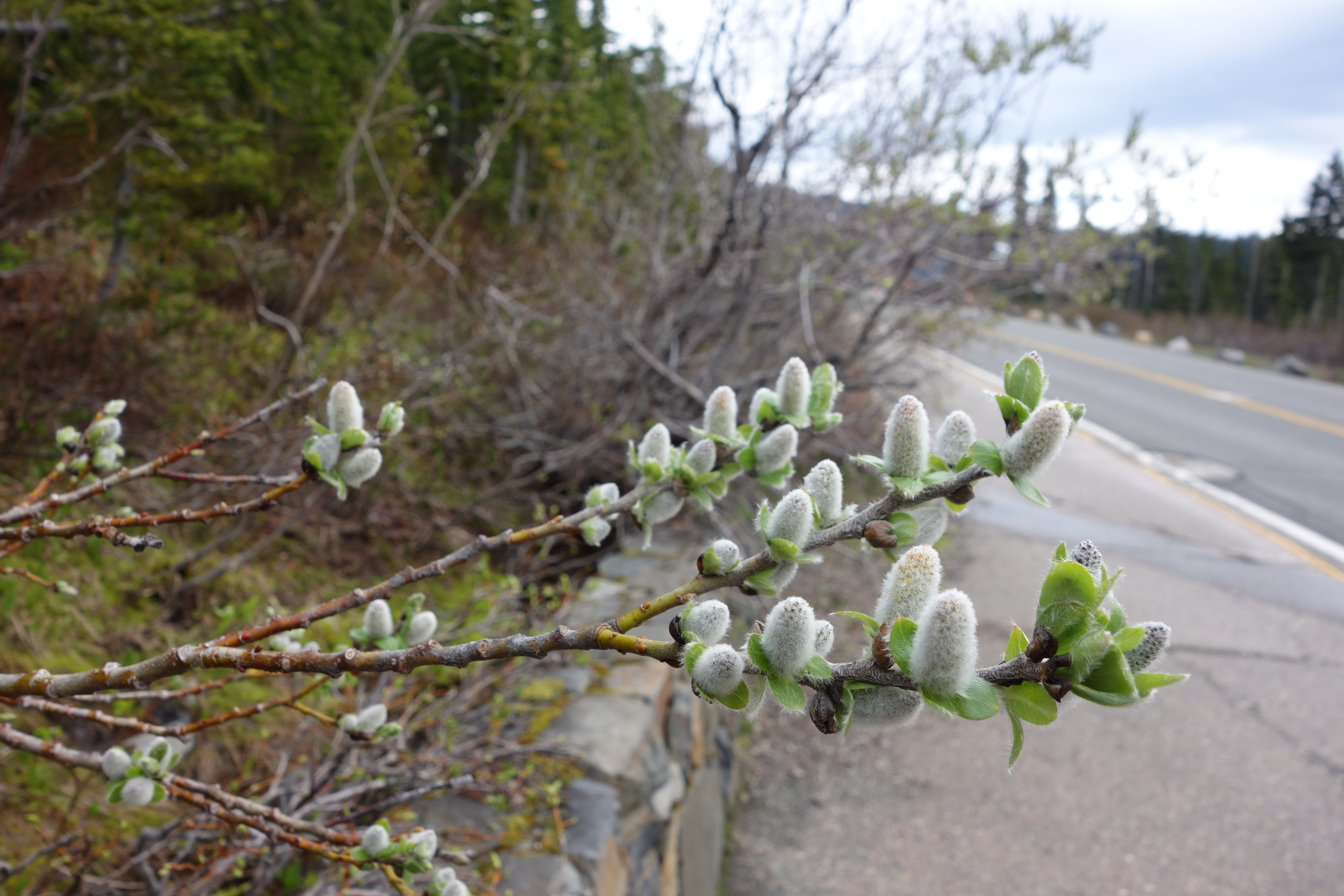

Conservation status
- Least Concern (IUCN 3.1)

Scientific classification
- Kingdom: Plantae
- Clade: Tracheophytes
- Clade: Angiosperms
- Clade: Eudicots
- Clade: Rosids
- Order: Malpighiales
- Family: Salicaceae
- Genus: Salix
- Species: S. commutata

Binomial name
- Salix commutata Bebb

Synonyms
- Salix barclayi var. commutata (Bebb) Kelso; Salix commutata var. denudata Bebb; Salix commutata subsp. mixta Piper; Salix commutata var. puberula Bebb; Salix commutata var. sericea Bebb

= Salix commutata =

Undergreen willow

Species of flowering plant

Salix commutata, the undergreen willow, is a plant species native to western Canada and the north-western United States. It has been reported from Alaska, Yukon, the Northwest Territories, British Columbia, Alberta, Saskatchewan, Montana, Idaho. Washington and Oregon. It grows on rocky alpine and subalpine slopes, conifer forests, stream banks, bogs, etc.

Salix commutata is a shrub up to 3 m tall. Leaves are elliptic to ovate, up to 10 cm long, sometimes with a few teeth, both sides with some white hairs but not glaucous (waxy).
