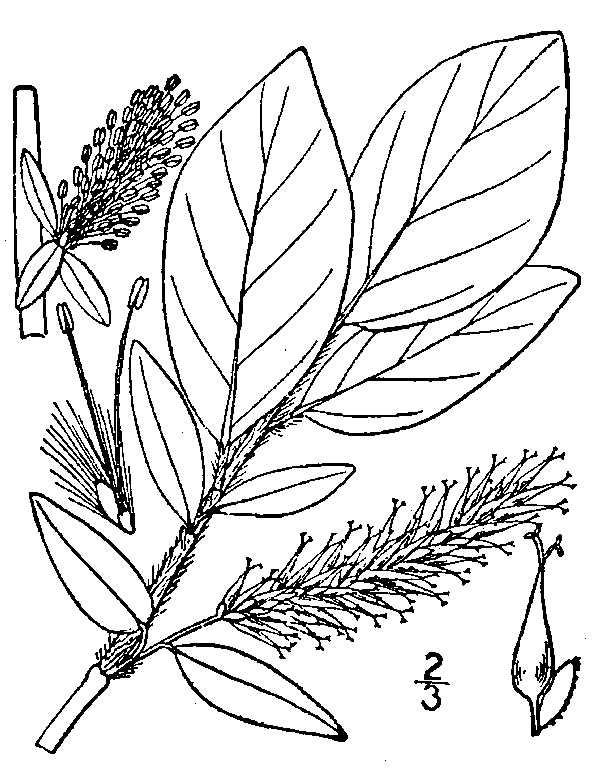

Conservation status
- Least Concern (IUCN 3.1)

Scientific classification
- Kingdom: Plantae
- Clade: Tracheophytes
- Clade: Angiosperms
- Clade: Eudicots
- Clade: Rosids
- Order: Malpighiales
- Family: Salicaceae
- Genus: Salix
- Species: S. barclayi

Binomial name
- Salix barclayi Andersson

= Salix barclayi =

Species of willow

Salix barclayi, or Barclay's willow, is a species of willow native to North America, found primarily in the Northwestern area of the United States and Canada. It grows near lakes and streams at elevation. It is a shrub, that can grow up to 2.5 m. (8 ft.) tall and tends to be slender. Leaves are elliptic to obovate, 2–6 cm long and 1–2.5 cm wide. Leaves are hairy when young, with midrib hairs lasting into maturity. Catkins are on short, leafy peduncles. Staminate catkins are 3 cm long with 2 stamens, while pistillate catkins are 2.5–5 cm long and glabrous.

== Care ==
This plant prefers partial sun and well-drained, moist soil to survive efficiently. This plant should grow very quickly, but tends to spread very slowly.
