= Gerardia =

Gerardia may refer to:

- Gerardia L., a plant genus now a synonym of Stenandrium Nees in family Acanthaceae
- Gerardia Benth., a plant genus now a synonym of Agalinis Raf. in family Orobanchaceae
- Gerardia Lacaze-Duthiers, 1864, a genus of cnidarians, now a synonym of Savalia Nardo, 1844
- Common names of several species of Agalinis Raf. formerly in Gerardia Benth., including:
  - Agalinis acuta
  - Agalinis auriculata
  - Agalinis purpurea
  - Agalinis skinneriana
  - Agalinis tenuifolia
