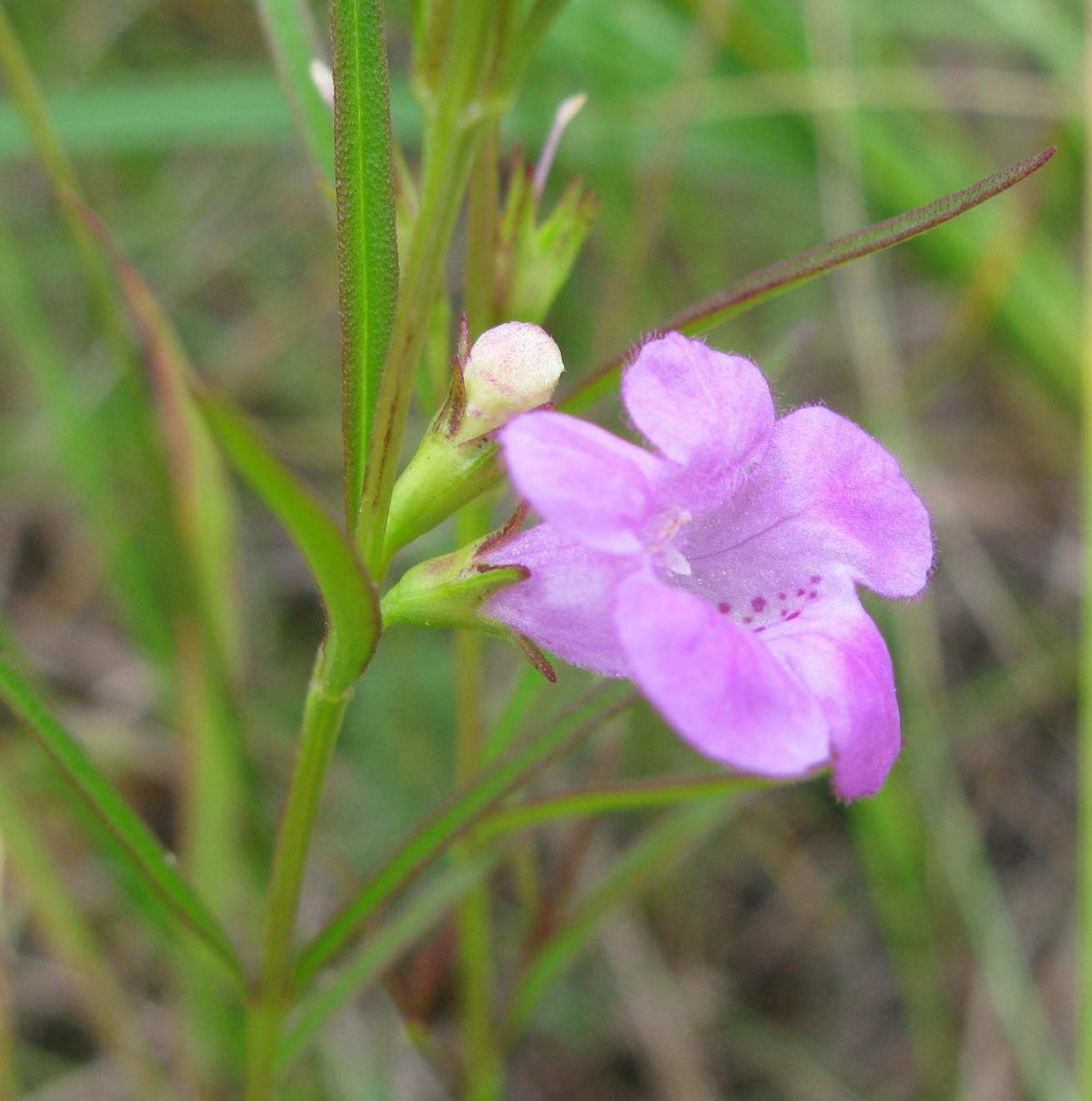
- Purple bloom

Conservation status
- Secure (NatureServe)

Scientific classification
- Kingdom: Plantae
- Clade: Tracheophytes
- Clade: Angiosperms
- Clade: Eudicots
- Clade: Asterids
- Order: Lamiales
- Family: Orobanchaceae
- Genus: Agalinis
- Species: A. paupercula

Binomial name
- Agalinis paupercula (A.Gray) Britton

Synonyms
- Agalinis purpurea var. parviflora (Benth.) Boivin; Aureolaria purpurea var. paupercula (A.Gray) Farw.; Gerardia purpurea var. paupercula A.Gray; Gerardia paupercula Britton

= Agalinis paupercula =

Species of flowering plant

Agalinis paupercula, commonly known as the smallflower false foxglove, is a hemiparasitic annual plant native to the eastern parts of the United States and Canada. Found in open, moist areas, its purple flowers are borne on a 30-to-70-centimeter (12 to 28 in) stem, and bloom in August and September. The species has often been treated as a variety of Agalinis purpurea, the purple false foxglove, and preliminary genetic evidence suggests that the two are, in fact, a single species.

== Description ==
Individuals of this species are herbaceous, erect annuals, 30 to 70 centimeters (12 to 28 in) tall. The smooth stem is four-angled and may be simple or branching. The stem or stems bear opposite, sessile leaves, lacking lobes, which are linear and 2 to 4 millimeters (0.08 to 0.16 in) wide. Leaves on branches may be borne alternately.

The flowers appear from August to September. They are borne in racemes, on pedicels of 1 to 4 millimeters (0.04 to 0.16 in), borne in the leaf axils of the upper leaves. They are surrounded by a calyx of five sepals, fused into a tube at the base and separated into distinct lobes above. The pointed, triangular lobes of the calyx are almost as long as its tube. Within the calyx lies the corolla of the flower, which is campanulate (bell-shaped) and pink to purple in color, with five slightly irregular, spreading lobes. The corolla is 1.5 to 2 centimeters (0.6 to 0.8 in) in length. The tube of the corolla tends to bulge on the underside. Within the flower are four stamens and a flattened stigma, the lower pair of stamens longer than the upper. The filaments are hairy near the base. The flowers mature into globose to subglobose, loculicidal fruits.

Agalinis paupercula is quite similar to A. purpurea, and may represent a variety of that species. The two can be distinguished by the smaller flowers of A. paupercula (A. purpurea has a corolla of 2 to 4 centimeters (0.8 to 1.6 in)), and by the long lobes of the calyx, which in A. purpurea are typically not more than half the length of the calyx tube.

== Taxonomy ==
The taxon was originally described by Asa Gray in 1878 as Gerardia purpurea var. paupercula, a variety of the purple false foxglove. He distinguished it from more typical specimens of G. purpurea by its smaller flowers, taller stem, and lighter color. In 1894, Nathaniel Lord Britton recognized it as a separate species, G. paupercula. He transferred it, with the rest of the North American Gerardia, to Agalinis, as A. paupercula, in 1913. Genetic studies thus far have been unable to distinguish between A. paupercula and A. purpurea, and it is possible that the two species will be consolidated again. However, these studies did not sample a large number of A. paupercula populations and are not definitive.

== Distribution and habitat ==
Distributed throughout the northeast region of the United States and in the eastern regions of Canada, A. paupercula is classified as Threatened in the state of New York, and Endangered in the states of Pennsylvania and Ohio. It is only present on Long Island at Ronkonkoma Lake.

Agalinis paupercula prefers a sunny, moist habitat. Such areas include bogs, shores, barrens, and in sandy soil.

== Ecology ==
Agalinis paupercula is a hemiparasite, deriving some of its nutrients from the roots of woody and herbaceous plants around it. It is self-compatible when mating.
