= Western sunflower =

Western sunflower is a common name for several plants and may refer to:

- Helianthus anomalus, native to the southwestern United States
- Helianthus occidentalis, native to the eastern and central United States
