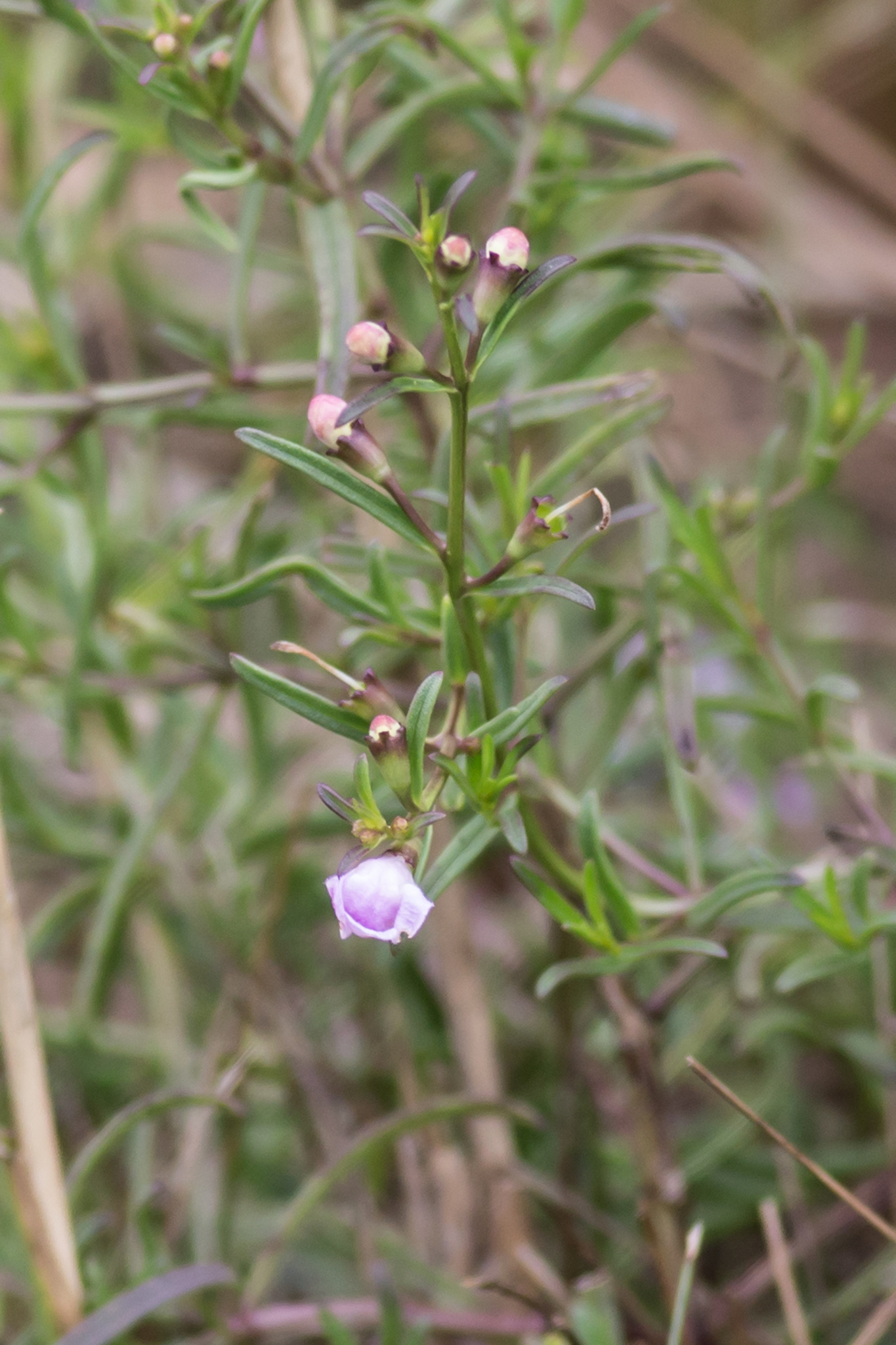

Scientific classification
- Kingdom: Plantae
- Clade: Tracheophytes
- Clade: Angiosperms
- Clade: Eudicots
- Clade: Asterids
- Order: Lamiales
- Family: Orobanchaceae
- Genus: Agalinis
- Species: A. maritima

Binomial name
- Agalinis maritima (Rafinesque) Rafinesque

Synonyms
- Gerardia maritima

= Agalinis maritima =

Species of plant

Agalinis maritima, commonly called saltmarsh false foxglove, is an annual herbaceous plant. It is a halophytic, obligate wetland species found in the eastern Atlantic seaboard from Nova Scotia to Texas, extending further south towards the Lucayan Archipelago and the Greater Antilles.

== Distribution ==
Agalinis maritima is found in coastal salt and brackish marshes, including mangrove swamps and salt flats. In Maine, it was most often found in high (upper) salt marsh where slight depressions have sparse vegetative cover and low competition from species such as Spartina patens.

== Description ==
Sometimes confused with Agalinis purpurea, saltmarsh false foxglove can be recognized from its fleshy, obtuse leaves. It has pink or purple flowers arranged in short racemes; the blooms usually fall off within a day. It blooms in August and September. Agalinis maritima is a low-growing annual plant that reaches about 10 centimetres (3.9 in). It is usually branched from the base upwards with ascending branches.

It has a highly supported sister relationship Agalinis kingsii.

== Conservation ==
Agalinis maritima is threatened in New York state and rare in Maine and New Hampshire. It is endangered by invasive phragmites and wetland destruction due to human development.
