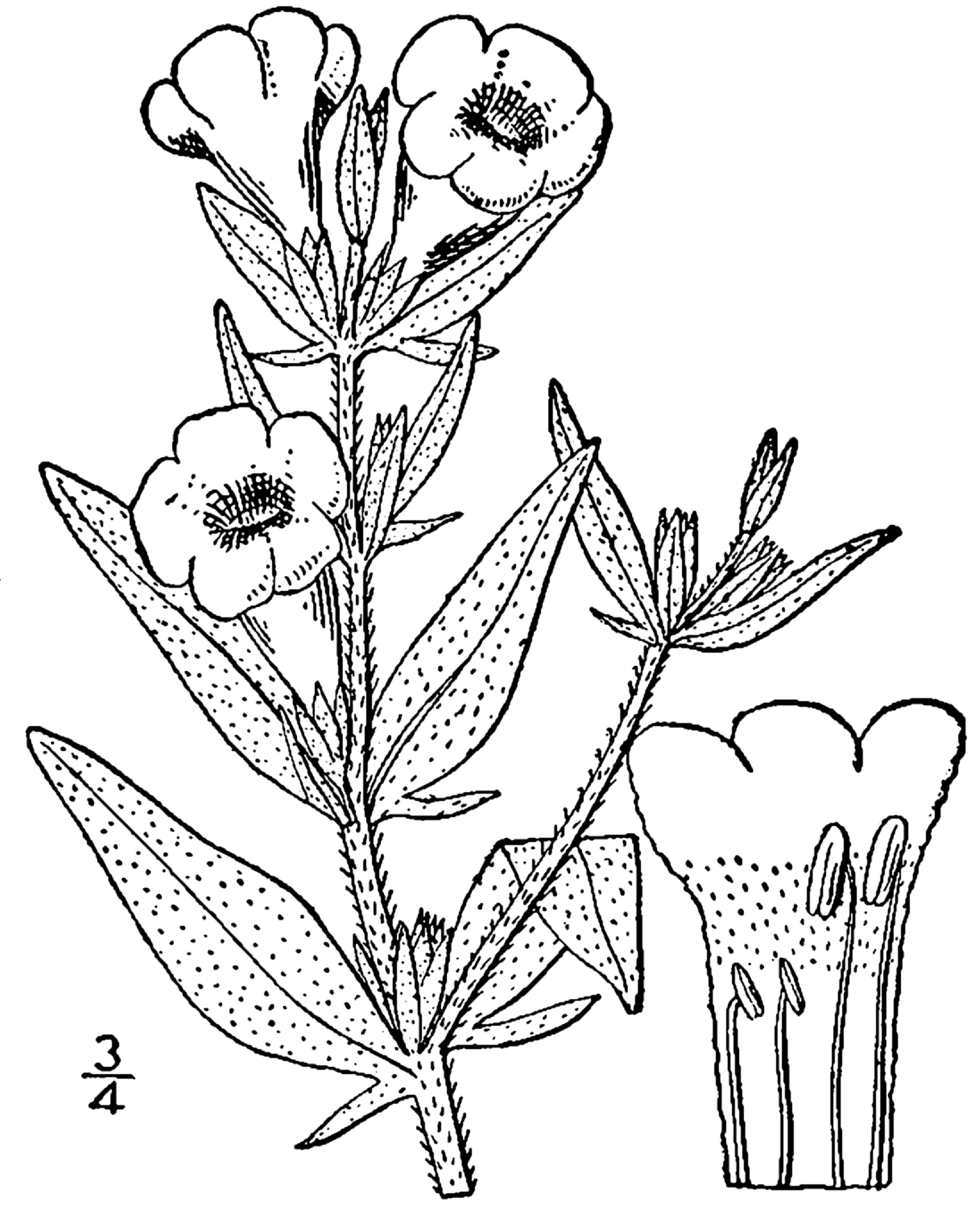
- Botanical illustration

Conservation status
- Vulnerable (NatureServe)

Scientific classification
- Kingdom: Plantae
- Subkingdom: Viridiplantae
- Division: Tracheophyta
- Class: Magnoliopsida
- Order: Lamiales
- Family: Orobanchaceae
- Genus: Agalinis
- Species: auriculata

Binomial name
- Agalinis auriculata (Michx.) S.F. Blake

Synonyms
- Gerardia auriculata Michx.(1795); Tomanthera auriculata (Michx.) Raf.(1836); Otophylla michauxii Benth.(1846); Otophylla auriculata (Michx.) Small(1913)

= Agalinis auriculata =

Species of flowering plant

Agalinis auriculata is a species of flowering plant in the family Orobanchaceae known as earleaf false foxglove, auriculate false foxglove, and earleaf gerardia. It is endemic to the United States, where it occurs from New Jersey west to Minnesota and throughout most southern states.

== Species description ==
This plant is a hairy annual herb producing an erect stiff stem up to 90 cm (35 in) tall that has retrorse-hispid hairs and auricled leaves. The stem is also a four-angled structure meaning instead of being cylindrical, it has four distinct angles. The leaves are sessile (they attach directly to the stem) and range from being lanceolate to ovate-oblong in length and are arranged oppositely on the stem. With age the stem and leaves of this plant are known to redden.

=== Flower ===
The flower blooms from July to September and lasts a day. Flowers are tubular to bell-shaped and expand outward into five lobes. The corolla is approximately 20-25 mm (0.8-1 in) and is bilaterally symmetrical rather than being perfectly symmetrical. The two upper lobes of the corolla are closely united, while the three lower lobes are more distinctly separated. Together, however, they form a two-lipped arrangement. They are generally pink, rose-colored, or purple. The corollas of this plant are found on stalks that are less than 0.5 mm (0.02 in) tall.

==== Floral Markings ====
Unlike many related Agalinis species that are marked with yellow throat lines, darker purple spots are found in the throat of this plant which uniquely identifies this species.

=== Fruit ===
This plant's fruit is a dry oval capsule, 1.3-1.5 cm (0.5-0.6 in) long. Each capsule contains upwards of 80-130 brown seeds that feature a honey-comb like surface.

== Reproduction ==
The plants are annual and complete their life cycle within a year. During the year, the seeds usually germinate during the spring and flowers typically bloom in the fall. The seeds need cold temperatures and light before they are capable of growing. Seeds typically remain in the soil until the conditions around them are suitable for growth. Bees, syrphid flies, soldier beetles, and leaf beetles are various examples of known pollinators who visit Agalinis Auriculata during their one-day receptive period. However, when not visited by a pollinator, the plants able to self-pollinate, with its fruit set remaining largely unaffected. Furthermore, this study also concluded that out-crossing is possible, which maintains genetic diversity, but uncommon in certain populations due to differing amounts of available Agalinis Auriculata.

Each flower contains one long and one short pair of pollen-producing stamens. When the flower opens in the fall, the stigma and stamen stick out. The bees will bump into the stigma first because of how the stamens are lined up and thus drop off the pollen it had collected from other flowers. Afterwards, it will brush along the longer and shorter stamens inside to collect the new pollen. There are filament trichomes on the stamen that the bees can grip onto and ones with more hairs give them the ability to hold onto better. This allows the bees to shake out a lot of pollen quickly and this important for Agalinis auriculata because they have short lifespans. For bees that only brush by the flower; however, the extra amount of hair actually prevents them from getting as much pollen.

Since Agalinis auriculata only survives a year at a time, it has to bloom and make seeds within one growing season. The seeds usually rely on 12 weeks of cold temperatures and if the conditions are optimal, the flowers open in the mornings for five to six hours. This is when the flower typically releases its pollen first, and then the stigma becomes ready to accept the pollen that is dropped off from bees.

== Distribution and habitat ==
This plant has a wide geographical distribution and it was formerly more common than it is today. It occurs in the eastern United States, in the Midwestern and South-central regions with some populations in Maryland. Historically, it was also in New Jersey, Texas, Oklahoma, West Virginia and the District of Columbia; however, it is presumed extirpated from Michigan and New Jersey. The plant grows in the Black Prairie belt in Mississippi, and the belt extends into Alabama. In Alabama, it is classified as critically imperiled (S1). In 2007, it was found in Pickens County, in a blackland prairie, and there are older records from three other Alabama counties going back to 1841.

Since 1990, there have been an estimated 200 documented extant occurrences. The number of plants in a population fluctuates year to year. Larger populations have hundreds of plants, but there are many with fewer than 100 plants. The species is not common at one locality but rather occurs as scattered individuals or small populations. The largest populations are in Arkansas, Missouri, and Mississippi. It is an endangered species in Minnesota where historical records report that it was found growing in wet meadows in the lower Mississippi valley but much of its natural habitat has been destroyed especially around the Twin Cities.

It grows in numerous habitat types: mesic to dry prairies, fallow fields, woodland edges, tallgrass prairies, blackland prairies, prairie-like glades, and barrens. At a studied site in Missouri, the soil was silty, deep, nearly level, somewhat poorly to well drained, and alluvial. It also exhibited water pooling in low spots when it was wet. It was also documented at a prairie site in Oktibbeha County, Mississippi, growing in the Black Prairie region where the soil is black, high in organic matter, and lies over chalk. The climate of the county is warm and humid. In Illinois and Mississippi, studied populations were found on prairie remnants that are threatened by invasive and woody plants, and in the Black Prairie in Mississippi, remnants are generally only found along roadsides, railroads, and power lines. It appears to require soil disturbance for seed germination. In the past, this disturbance may have been caused by herds of bison. The plant can colonize mounds of earth that have been turned over by pocket gophers (Geomys bursarius).

== Roles and Uses ==
Agalinis auriculata is a member of the Orobanchaceae (Broomrape) family, which includes a number of hemiparasitic (partially-parasitic) and holoparasitic (fully parasitic) herbaceous plants. The earleaf false foxglove is a hemiparasite, meaning that while it is capable of photosynthesizing to create its own food, this plant will also leech from the water and nutrients of other plants. It does this via structures called haustoria, which reach laterally underground to the root systems of neighboring plant hosts. Four grasses and composites were identified in controlled studies as host plants of Agalinis auriculata: Helianthus occidentalis, Rudbeckia fulgida (Cunningham and Parr 1990), Silphium terebinthinaceum and Solidago rigida (Molano-Flores et al. 2003). All are members of the family Asteraceae, though the full extent of potential host plants is not yet known, and the discovery of more hosts is likely. Even in the absence of any host plant, Molano-Flores et al. (2003) proved that Agalinis auriculata is still capable of growing to full maturity, including the production of fruit, countering the findings of the prior studies by Cunningham and Parr (1990) and Baskin et al. (1991). Baird and Riopel (1984) proposed the idea that Agalinis auriculata grows autotrophically by nature, but it is the reception of a specific chemical produced by the roots of a nearby host plant that initiates the species’ parasitism.

Mulvaney et al. found that Agalinis auriculata flowers are frequently pollinated by two primary insects, the Common Eastern Bumble Bee (Bombus impatiens) and the Two-spotted Long-horned Bee (Melissodes bimaculate). They also found that the primary consumer of Agalinis auriculata are the larvae of the Verbena Bud Moth (Endothenia hebesana), which targets the seeds in the fruit of the plant. Nine other species that fed on various parts of Agalinis auriculata, including the leaves, seeds, pollen, and/or flowers, were identified; however, outside of the moth larvae, the levels of herbivory remained relatively low. This species is not known to be a designated food source for larger herbivorous animals, though it has been impacted by the general grazing of species such as white-tailed deer and bison.

The uses of Agalinis auriculata for humans, such as economically or pharmaceutically, are very limited; however, the growth and survival of Agalinis auriculata can serve as an indicator of the health of the grassland or prairie ecosystem in which it resides. This is due to the species’ known reliance on natural disturbances, including fires and wildlife grazing.

== Threats and conservation efforts ==
Agalinis auriculata has no federal status but it is considered endangered in several states. The species has a global rank of G3 and is a candidate to be listed under the Federal Endangered Species Act. Agalinis auriculata is thought to be highly threatened and has seen a long-term trend decline of 30-50% in its distribution. In Minnesota, it was listed as endangered in 1984, and it is also listed as endangered in Pennsylvania. Agalinis auriculata appears rarely even in its native locations; most populations have fewer than fifty plants.

There are a variety of natural and anthropogenic threats to Agalinis auriculata. Invasive plants, overgrowth of other plants, herbivory by insects, lack of availability of hosts, and poor seedling survivorship are all natural factors that impact the rarity of Agalinis auriculata. Particularly, forest succession of prairies can lead to the decline of Agalinis auriculata. White-tailed deer grazing can also reduce the fertility of Agalinis auriculata. Humans have contributed to the decline of Agalinis auriculata as well. Through agriculture, many prairie habitats of Agalinis Auriculata have been destroyed or fragmented. Development and road construction, particularly in Pennsylvania, have contributed to the decline of this plant. Excessive mowing over the summer months can also prevent flowering of Agalinis auriculata which reduces its dispersion.

There are several different methods for conservation of Agalinis auriculata. Agalinis auriculata has a deep seed bank and can exist in a dormant state for extended periods of time; in order to grow, it requires stimulus. Due to this, disturbance is necessary for the growth of the plant. To help with this, prescribed burns, natural grazing of elk or bison, and excavation of seed beds by small mammals are recommended to help with the distribution of Agalinis auriculata. To conserve Agalinis auriculata, the natural ecosystem needs to be left alone and allowed to proceed without human disturbance. The restoration of prairie habitats and the management of forest succession and invasive plants is required as well. Currently, it is grown on several protected wildlife areas such as Midewin National Tallgrass Prairie and Fort Campbell Military Reservation.

== Phylogenetics and adaptations ==
1) This phylogenetic tree is based off of a 2004 study which compared the differences between the Agalinis and closely related genera after conducting a DNA sequence analysis of 3 different chloroplasts gene regions (Neel and Cummings 2004).

2) Maximum likelihood phylogenetic tree of North American Agalinis species (Pettengill and Neel 2008)

As shown in the second figure, Pettengill and Neel used "maximum likelihood analyses of seven chloroplast DNA loci (aligned length = 11,076 base pairs (bp) and the nuclear ribosomal DNA ITS (internal transcribed spacer) locus (733 bp)" to demonstrate phylogenetic patterns and form a monophyletic group in the Orobanchaceae family. The data was derived from 79 individuals from 29 different species from within the Agalinis genus and confirmed that 19 shared a common ancestor (formed a monophyly). While certain species showed inconsistent cpDNA and nDNA analysis connections, the study emphasized shifting the focus to making assumptions of relations based on "full and chloroplasts data sets".

An interesting finding when exploring how emasculated treatments might affect seed germination in Agalinis auriculata showed that when fewer numbers of seeds are produced in the bagged, emasculated group, the average seed mass increases. This result supported previous ideas that some plants can compensate for lower fruit sets by redirecting their resources to the smaller number of seeds produced.

Another adaptation can be found in the seeds' honeycomb-like surface coat. This feature aids with buoyancy, both in the air and on the water, which can help with wider dispersal range .
