= Black Earth Rettenmund Prairie State Natural Area =

Protected area in Wisconsin, US

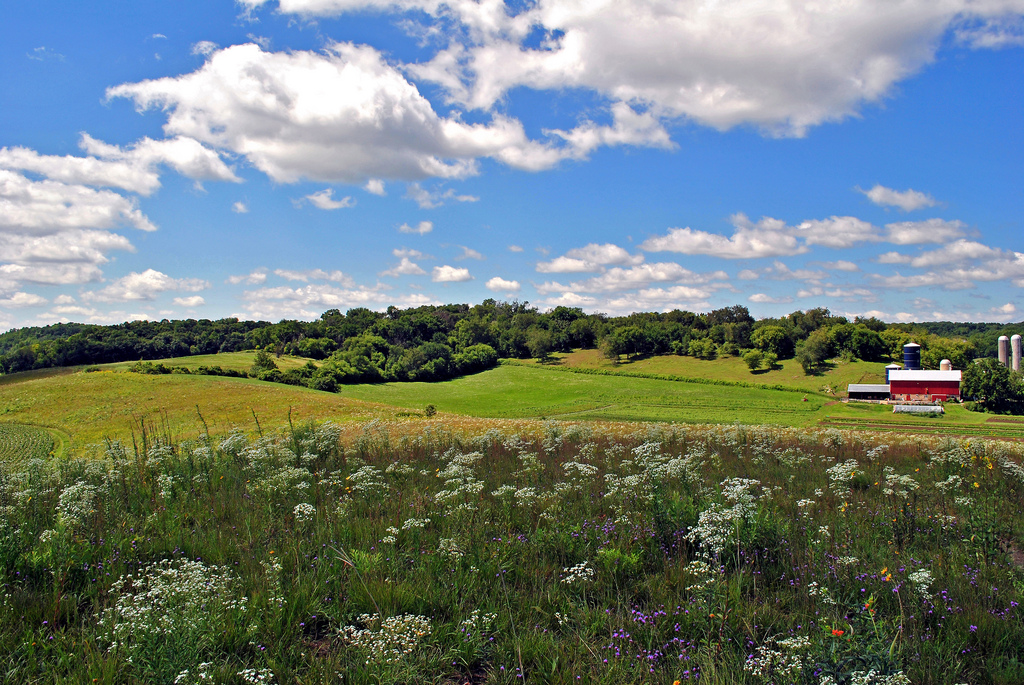
- Interactive map of Black Earth Rettenmund Prairie; State Natural Area
- Location: Dane County, Wisconsin
- Coordinates: 43°8′23″N 89°46′23″W
- Area: 17 acres (6.9 ha)
- Established: 1986
- Owner: The Prairie Enthusiasts
- Website: Official website

Black Earth Rettenmund Prairie is a Wisconsin Department of Natural Resources-designated State Natural Area featuring one of the few remaining dry-mesic prairies in Wisconsin, situated on a low Driftless Area knob and ridge. Despite the prairie's relatively small size, 130 native prairie plant species have been documented on the site. Many of these species are quite showy, including wood lily, shooting star, fringed puccoon, pasque flower, butterfly weed, and compass plant. Several rare species are also found on the site, including pomme-de-prairie, white camas, striped hairstreak, and the state-threatened species rough-stemmed false foxglove (Agalinis gattingeri) and regal fritillary.

The original land-surveyor records for the area indicate presettlement vegetation was treeless prairie. Following settlement in the area, the prairie escaped plowing, although some grazing undoubtedly occurred, and old tractor furrows can still be seen along the top of the ridge. The most recent private owners preserved the prairie for over 40 years. The gradual decline of the prairie over this time, as well as the owners' desire to preserve it, led to the Nature Conservancy's purchase of the prairie in 1986, below market value. Restoration of the prairie soon commenced, and in 2003, management was taken over by the Prairie Enthusiasts, an organization dedicated to preserving and restoring native prairie remnants. Full ownership of the site was transferred to the Prairie Enthusiasts in 2007.

== Location and access ==
Black Earth Rettenmund Prairie is located in northwestern Dane County, approximately 1.25 miles (2.01 km) west of Black Earth. A small parking lot dedicated for the site is located along the south side of Fesenfeld Rd., approximately 0.25 miles (0.40 km) west of its intersection with County Highway F. A trail winds through the entire length of the prairie.

== Gallery ==
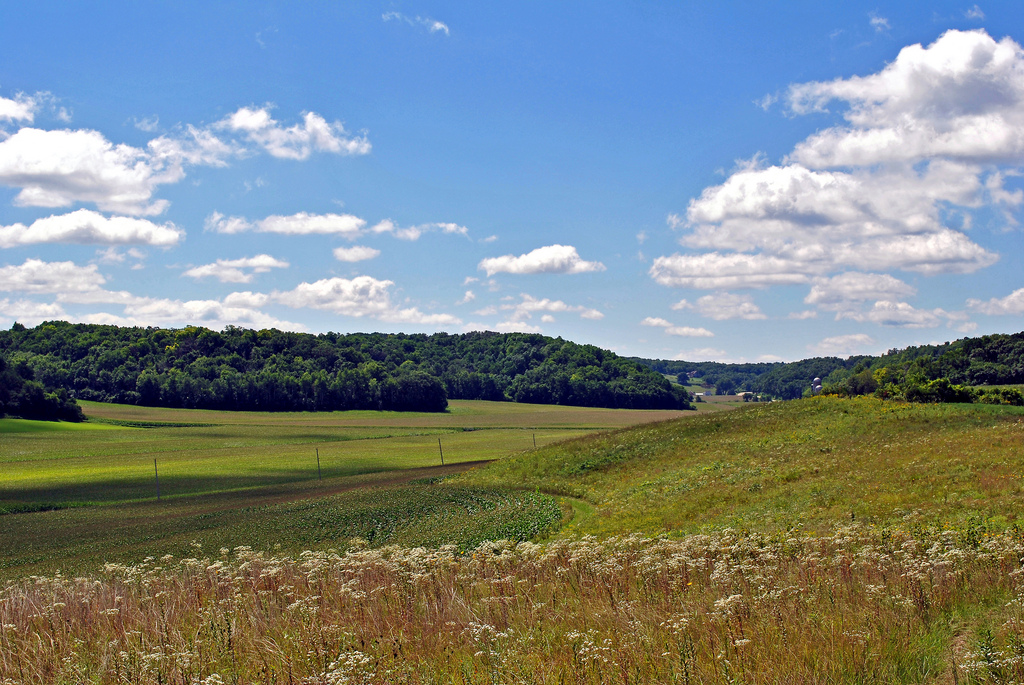
Looking southwest, along the southeast side of the ridge

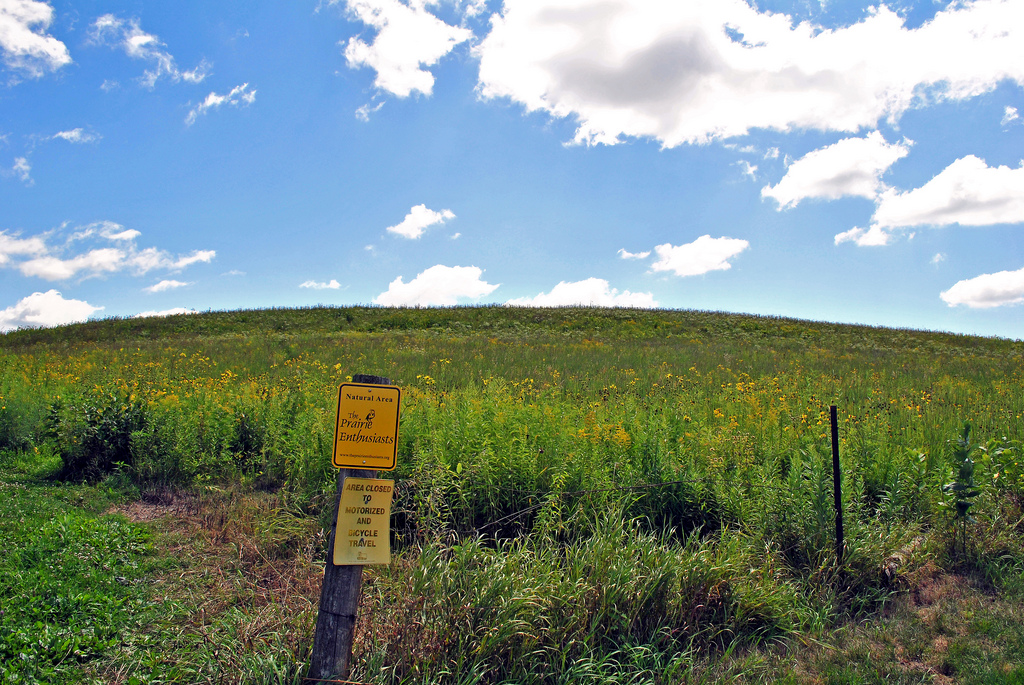
Looking up at the ridge, from the parking lot

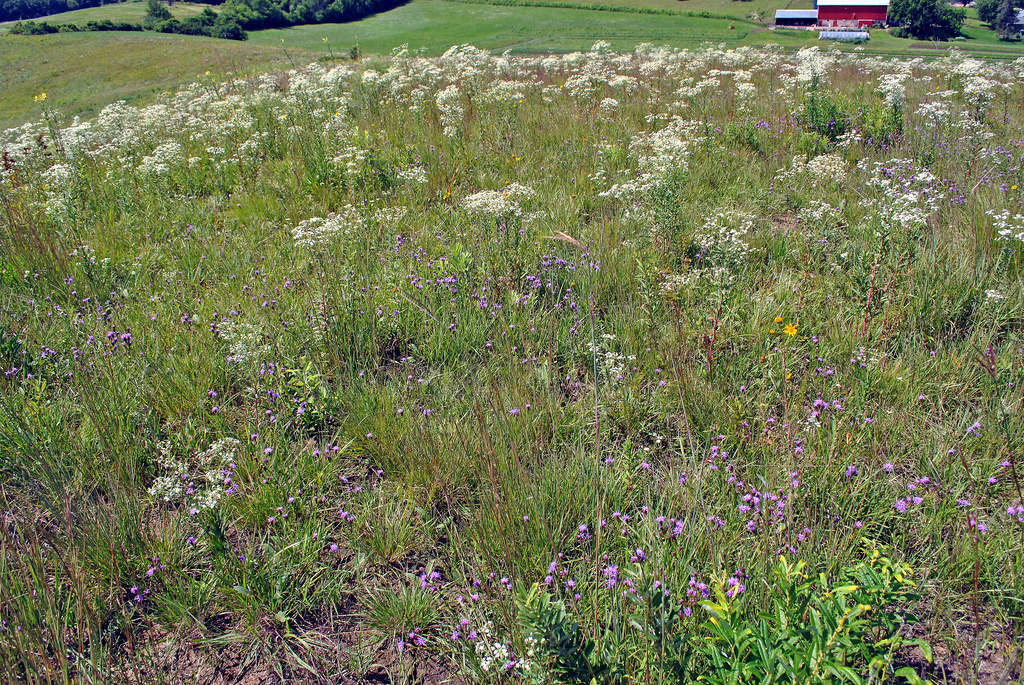
Mid-August prairie flowers, along the top of the ridge
