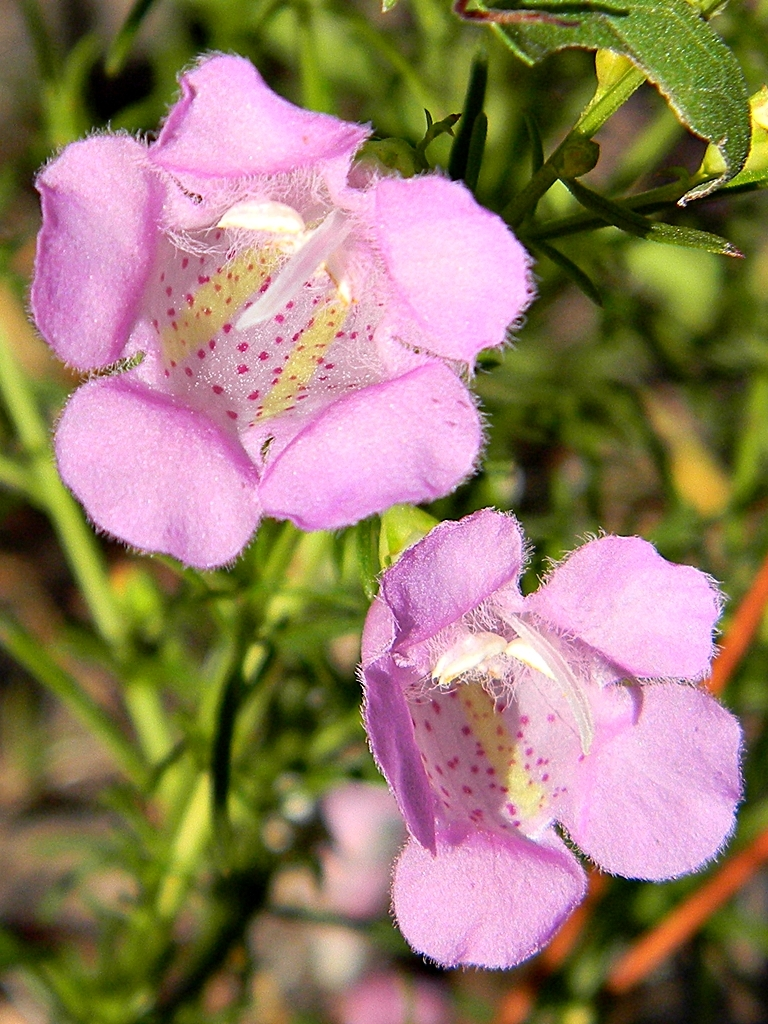

Scientific classification
- Kingdom: Plantae
- Clade: Embryophytes
- Clade: Tracheophytes
- Clade: Spermatophytes
- Clade: Angiosperms
- Clade: Eudicots
- Clade: Asterids
- Order: Lamiales
- Family: Orobanchaceae
- Genus: Agalinis
- Species: A. fasciculata

Binomial name
- Agalinis fasciculata (Elliott) Raf.

= Agalinis fasciculata =

Species of flowering plant

Agalinis fasciculata (commonly known as beach false foxglove) is an annual species native to the southeastern United States. A. fasciculata is a parasitic species that attaches to the roots of herbs and grasses. Some consider it to be a pioneer species in areas experiencing post-agricultural succession.

== Genomics ==
A chromosome-level reference genome assembly of Agalinis fasciculata was published in 2026, representing the first such genome for the genus Agalinis. The genome is approximately 2.29 Gb in size, with 14 pseudochromosomes containing 98.9% of the assembled sequence. The assembly has a BUSCO completeness score of 98.4%, and 32,602 protein-coding genes were annotated. Complete chloroplast and mitochondrial genome sequences were also assembled.

== Description ==
Agalinis fasciculata possesses stiff, slender stems that reach a height between 30 and 90 cm (12 and 35 in). The leaves are oppositely arranged and linear in shape. They range in size from 5 to 15 mm (0.20 to 0.59 in) in length and are usually 1 mm (0.04 in) in width. They are often rough to the touch.

The flowers possess 5 sepals and 5 petals, the latter being pink or purple in color.

== Distribution and habitat ==
Within the southeast region of the United States, A. fasciculata's range extends from North Carolina to Florida and westward to Texas. It is also found north-eastern states of New Jersey, New York, Pennsylvania and Delaware as well as Cuba and Puerto Rico.

This species is considered to be a generalist as it can be found in a range of habitat types, including but not limited to: flatwoods, sandhills, coastal scrubs, and pine rocklands. It can occur on a wide variety of soil types, and may occur in environments with disturbed soils.

== Ecology ==
Agalinis fasciculata is insect pollinated and is recorded to have been visited in northern Florida by the bee species Caupolicana electa, Lasioglossum illinoense, Lasioglossum reticulatum, and Megachile pseudobrevis.
