= Agalinis itambensis =

Scientific classification
- Kingdom: Plantae
- Clade: Tracheophytes
- Clade: Angiosperms
- Clade: Eudicots
- Clade: Asterids
- Order: Lamiales
- Family: Orobanchaceae
- Genus: Agalinis
- Species: A. itambensis

Binomial name
- Agalinis itambensis V.C. Souza & S. I. Elias

Species of flowering plant

Agalinis itambensis is a plant species endemic to Brazil. It is known only from Serra do Itambé in the state of Minas Gerais.

Agalinis itambensis is an erect to trailing herb up to 30 cm tall. Stems are round or slightly angled in cross-section. Leaves are narrow and linear, up to 2.5 cm long. Flowers are strongly zygomorphic, up to 2 cm long, magenta with creamy stripes and purple spots.
