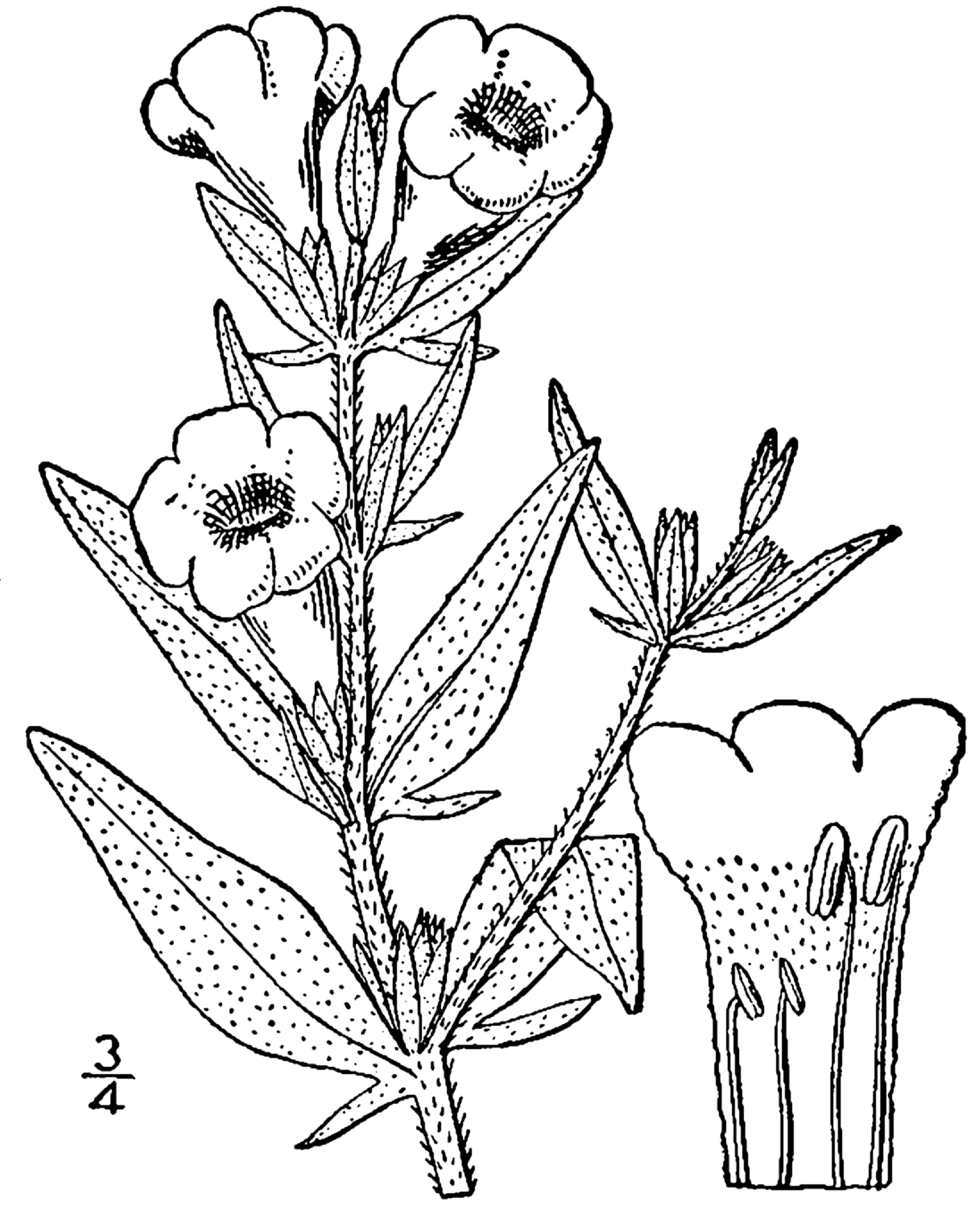

Conservation status
- Vulnerable (NatureServe)

Scientific classification
- Kingdom: Plantae
- Clade: Tracheophytes
- Clade: Angiosperms
- Clade: Eudicots
- Clade: Asterids
- Order: Lamiales
- Family: Orobanchaceae
- Genus: Agalinis
- Species: A. skinneriana

Binomial name
- Agalinis skinneriana (Alph.Wood) Britton

= Agalinis skinneriana =

Species of flowering plant

Agalinis skinneriana is a species of flowering plant in the family Orobanchaceae known by the common names Skinner's gerardia, Skinner's false foxglove and pale false foxglove. It is native to North America, where it occurs in Ontario south to Missouri and Louisiana.

== Description ==
This plant is an annual herb with four-angled stems growing up to 40 centimeters tall. The linear leaves are oppositely arranged and each is up to 2.5 centimeters long. The inflorescence is a raceme of pink or white flowers each up to 1.6 centimeters long. Blooming occurs in August through October. The flowers are visited by bees. However, each flower is open for only a few hours and it may pollinate itself. This plant is similar to and difficult to distinguish from several other Agalinis.

== Habitat ==
This plant grows on prairies. It can also be found in woods, barrens, and thickets. It is associated with other plants such as Agalinis purpurea, Aletris farinosa, Andropogon gerardi, Aster ptarmicoides, Calopogon tuberosus, Liatris spicata, Lobelia kalmii, Pycnanthemum virginianum, and Solidago ohioensis The plant often grows in habitat maintained by a regime of periodic wildfire. Fire suppression is a threat to it.
