= Agalinis divaricata =

Scientific classification
- Kingdom: Plantae
- Clade: Tracheophytes
- Clade: Angiosperms
- Clade: Eudicots
- Clade: Asterids
- Order: Lamiales
- Family: Orobanchaceae
- Genus: Agalinis
- Species: A. divaricata

Binomial name
- Agalinis divaricata (Chapm.) Pennell

Species of flowering plant

Agalinis divaricata is a flowering plant species in the genus Agalinis. It is commonly known as pineland false foxglove. A dicot, it grows in parts of Florida, Georgia and Alabama. It is in the Orobanchaceae (broomrape) family. It grows in dry longleaf pine forests and savannahs. The genus is hemiparasitic.
