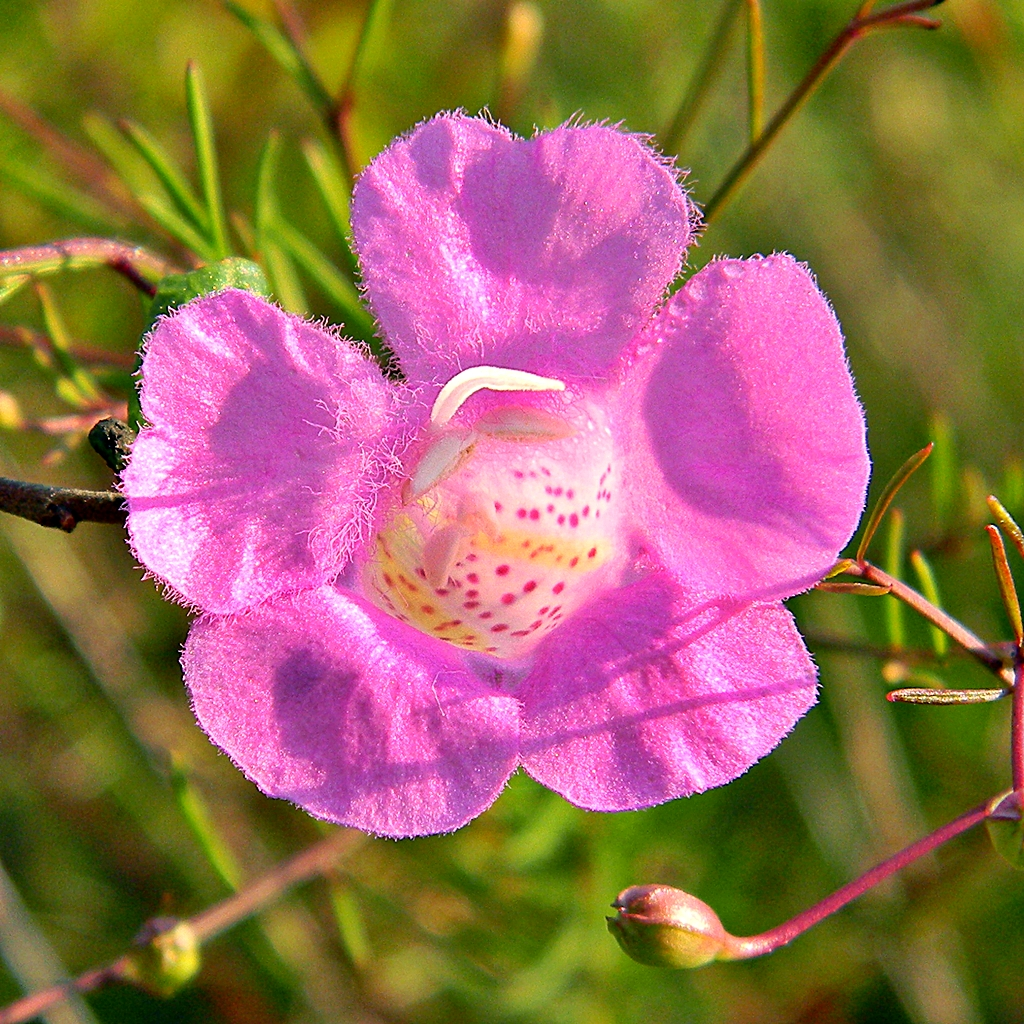

Scientific classification
- Kingdom: Plantae
- Clade: Tracheophytes
- Clade: Angiosperms
- Clade: Eudicots
- Clade: Asterids
- Order: Lamiales
- Family: Orobanchaceae
- Genus: Agalinis
- Species: A. filifolia

Binomial name
- Agalinis filifolia (Nutt.) Raf.

= Agalinis filifolia =

Species of flowering plant

Agalinis filifolia, commonly known as Seminole false foxglove, is an annual species found in the southeast United States, in the following states: Alabama, Georgia, and Florida. The majority of individuals occur in Florida, with minimal populations over the state line in Georgia and Alabama.

This species is commonly found in habitats such as coastal scrub and sandhills, although it is not limited to these environments. It may occur in a range of moisture conditions and is considered to be somewhat tolerant of shade.
