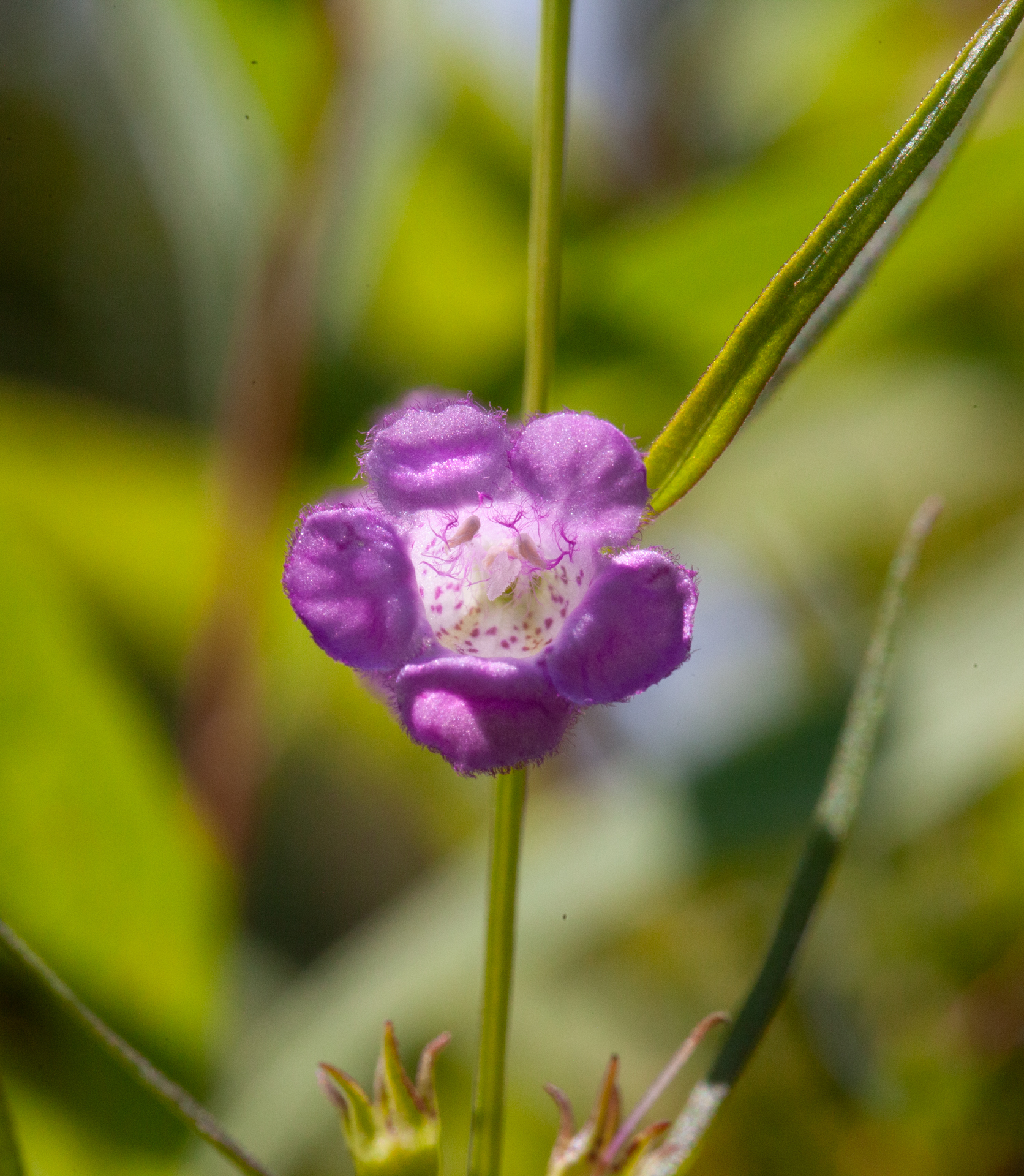

Conservation status
- Vulnerable (IUCN 2.3)

Scientific classification
- Kingdom: Plantae
- Clade: Tracheophytes
- Clade: Angiosperms
- Clade: Eudicots
- Clade: Asterids
- Order: Lamiales
- Family: Orobanchaceae
- Genus: Agalinis
- Species: A. neoscotica

Binomial name
- Agalinis neoscotica (Greene) Fernald

= Agalinis neoscotica =

Species of plant

Agalinis neoscotica, commonly known as Nova Scotia false foxglove, is a species of false foxglove. It is found in southwestern Nova Scotia along the coastal plain and neighbouring islands and in the southeastern portion of Maine.

== Description ==
Agalinis neoscotica is an annual herb, growing up to 18 in (0.46 m) tall. It has a "mixed" mating strategy and is able to delay self-pollinating germination. It has simple leaves which are which are opposite in arrangement.

== Distribution and habitat ==
Agalinis neoscotica is found in the Canadian provinces of New Brunswick and Nova Scotia, as well as Grand Manan Island and Sable Island. It also occurs in Washington county, Maine in the United States. Its habitats include bogs, brackish or salt marshes and flats, coastal beaches, fresh tidal marshes or flats, and wetland margins.
