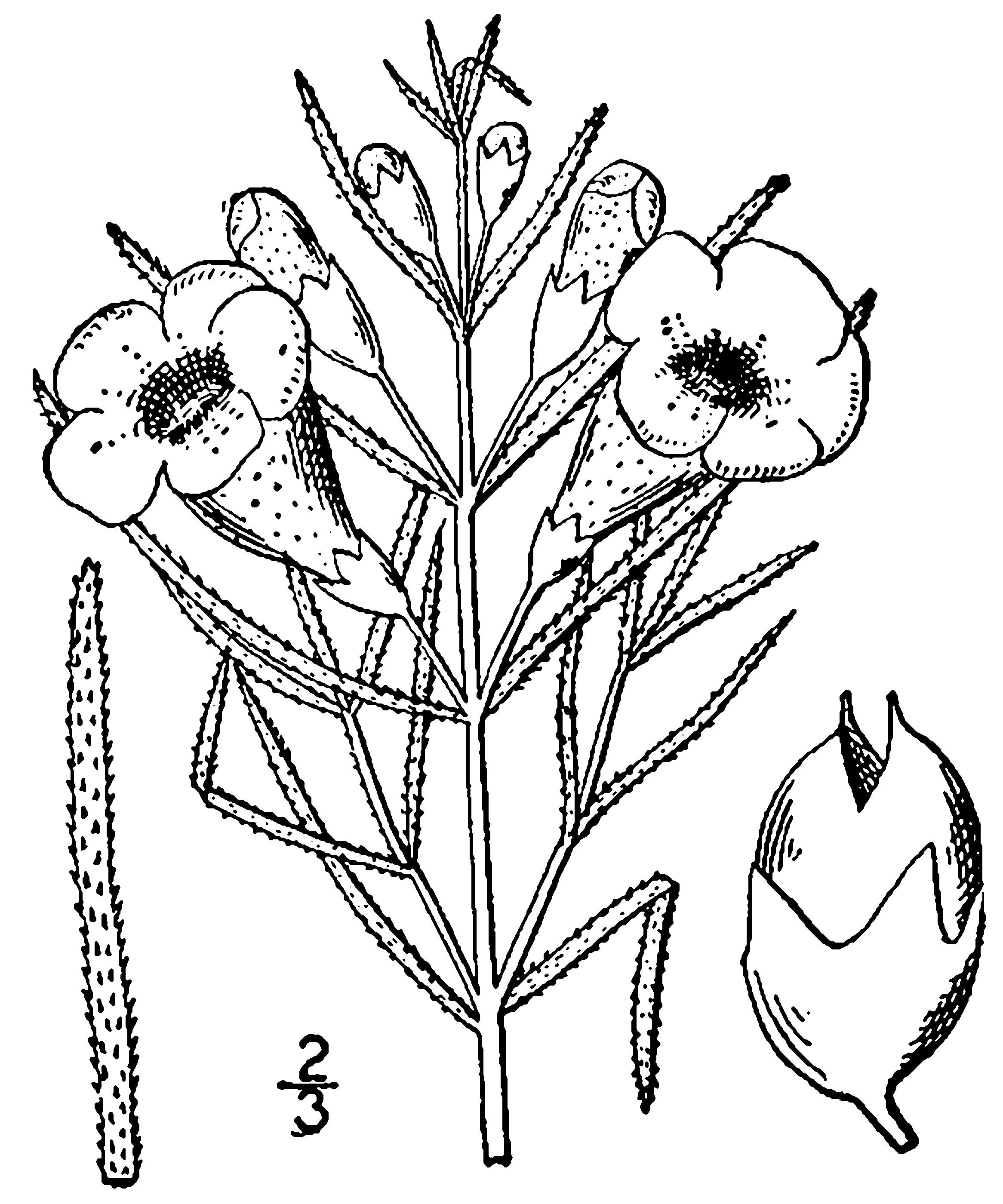

Conservation status
- Secure (NatureServe)

Scientific classification
- Kingdom: Plantae
- Clade: Tracheophytes
- Clade: Angiosperms
- Clade: Eudicots
- Clade: Asterids
- Order: Lamiales
- Family: Orobanchaceae
- Genus: Agalinis
- Species: A. aspera

Binomial name
- Agalinis aspera (Douglas ex Benth.) Britton

= Agalinis aspera =

Species of flowering plant

Agalinis aspera, the rough agalinis, rough false foxglove, or tall false foxglove, is a non-poisonous plant of the genus Agalinis, habitating in the dry prairies. It can grow to be about eight to twenty-four inches tall. When the flowers bloom, the colors vary between purple and pink.

The tall foxglove is native to some parts of the United States and Canada. According to USDA Plants, the places where the tall foxglove can be found are, "Arkansas, Iowa, Illinois, Kansas, Minnesota, Missouri, North Dakota, Nebraska, Oklahoma, South Dakota, Texas, Wisconsin, and Manitoba". It cannot be found in other locations is because they do not have the right habitats. The foxglove likes to bloom in the low wet meadows or along hillsides and the bloom period for the tall foxglove is from June to September.

It is in the family Orobanchaceae, but was formerly classified in the family Scrophulariaceae. It was realigned following molecular phylogeny data from the chloroplast genome.

Dr. Virginia Freire and Dr. Emmet J. Judziewicz (biology professors at the University of Wisconsin) mentioned that agalinis is Latin for "remarkable flax" and aspera is also Latin for " 'rough' or 'harsh' from coarse nature of leave".

The tall foxglove is considered endangered. One of the reasons why this plant is being wiped out is partially because of its location. When the tall foxglove is growing in the low wet plains, the plains tend to drain out and take the plants along with it. According to COSEWIC, "human impact poses the greatest threat to these populations because most of them are in road allowance areas. Any major disturbance of the road allowance undertaken for road expansion, road straightening, etc., would put these populations at risk".
