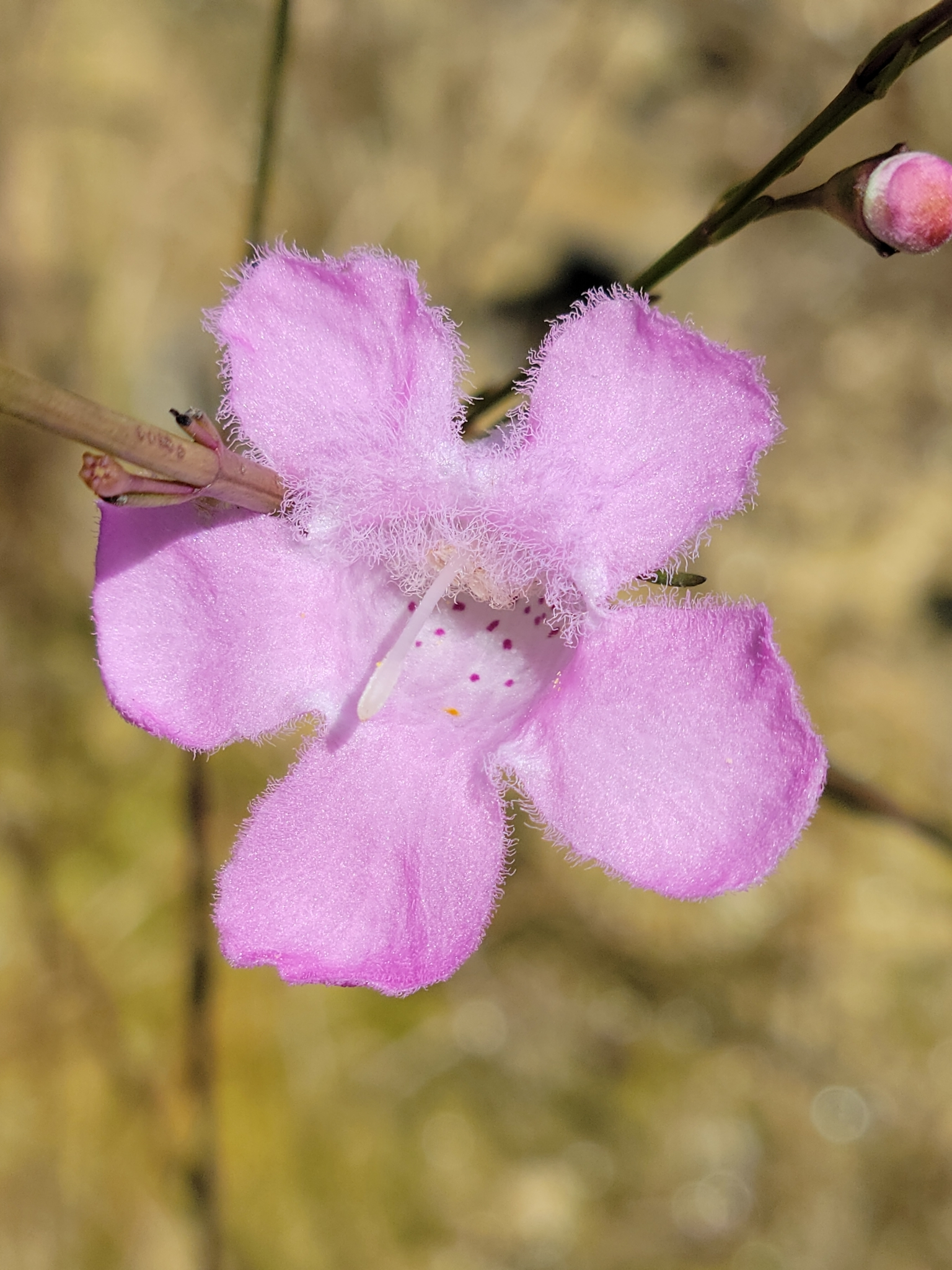

Conservation status
- Apparently Secure (NatureServe)

Scientific classification
- Kingdom: Plantae
- Clade: Tracheophytes
- Clade: Angiosperms
- Clade: Eudicots
- Clade: Asterids
- Order: Lamiales
- Family: Orobanchaceae
- Genus: Agalinis
- Species: A. linifolia

Binomial name
- Agalinis linifolia (Nutt.) Britton

Synonyms
- Gerardia linifolia Nutt.; Agalinis perennis Raf.

= Agalinis linifolia =

Species of flowering plant

Agalinis linifolia (known by common names including flaxleaf false foxglove, flaxleaf gerardia, and flaxleaf agalinis) is a perennial forb, native to the southeastern United States and Cuba, which produces lavender-colored flowers in late summer or early fall.

== Distribution and habitat ==
Agalinis linifolia can be found in ponds, pine savannas, and cypress savannas throughout coastal regions of the southeastern United States, from Delaware through Louisiana. It is also native to Cuba.

== Ecology ==
Like other members of the genus Agalinis, this species is hemiparasitic on a variety of hosts, particularly graminoids.

== Taxonomy ==
This species is a member of the genus Agalinis, which was formerly placed in the family Scrophulariaceae, but has more recently been placed in the family Orobanchaceae, in keeping with the findings of the Angiosperm Phylogeny Group.
