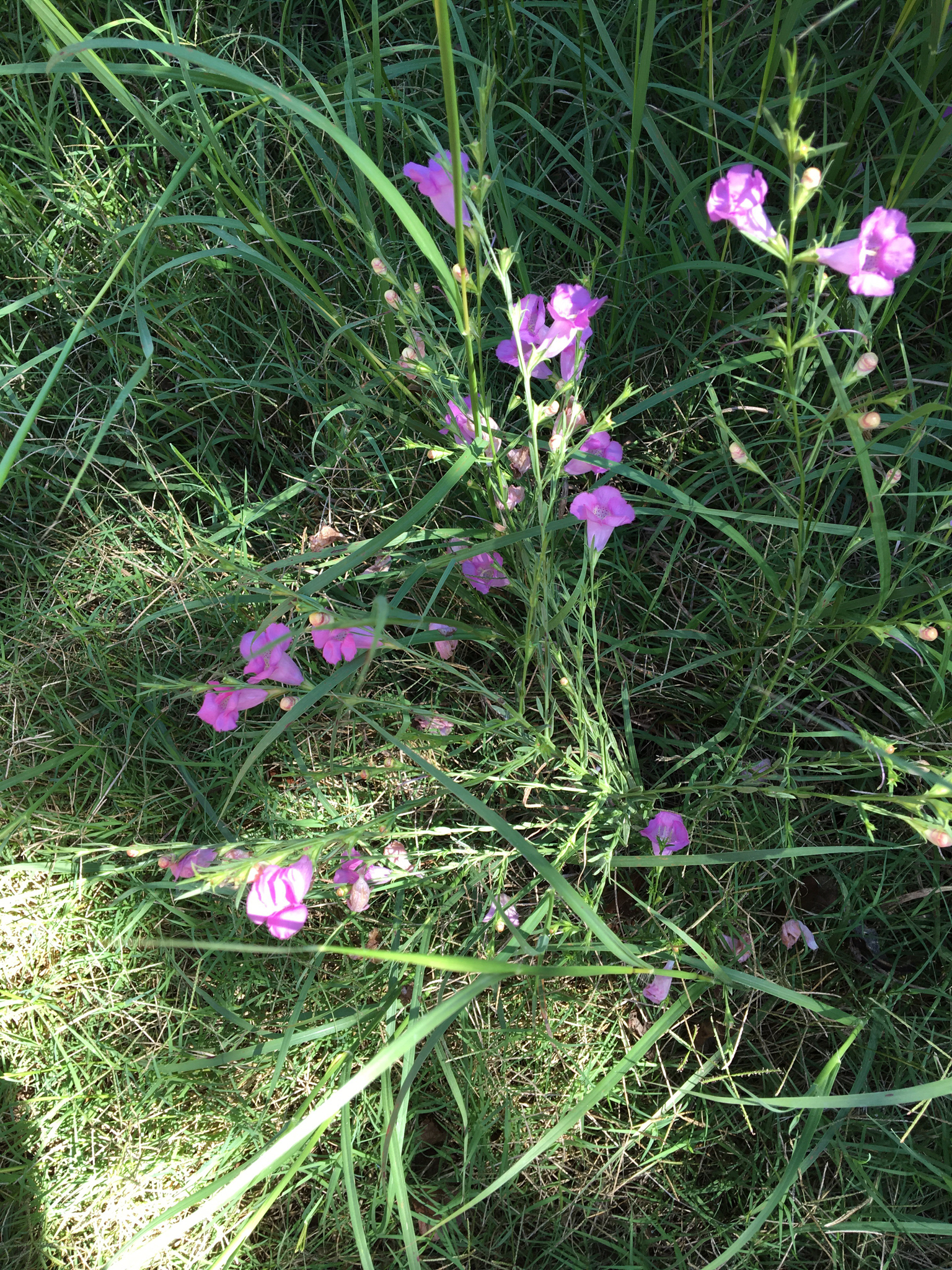

Conservation status
- Apparently Secure (NatureServe)

Scientific classification
- Kingdom: Plantae
- Clade: Tracheophytes
- Clade: Angiosperms
- Clade: Eudicots
- Clade: Asterids
- Order: Lamiales
- Family: Orobanchaceae
- Genus: Agalinis
- Species: A. heterophylla

Binomial name
- Agalinis heterophylla (Nutt.) Small ex Britton

Synonyms
- Aureolaria heterophylla (Nutt.) Farw.; Gerardia heterophylla Nutt.

= Agalinis heterophylla =

Species of flowering plant

Agalinis heterophylla is a species of flowering plant in the family Orobanchaceae known as prairie false foxglove. It is found in northern Mexico (Tamaulipas) and the southeastern and central United States.
