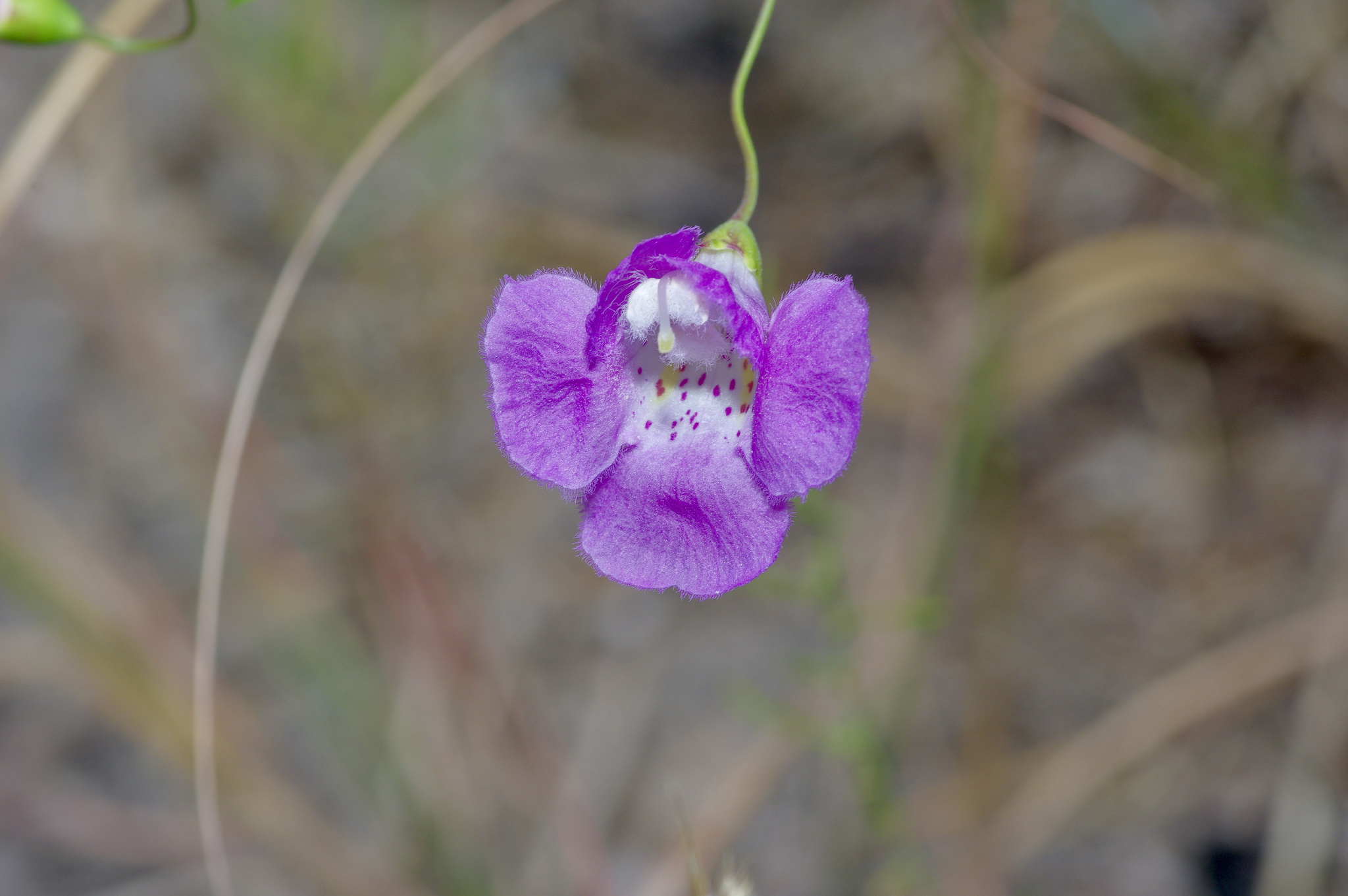

Conservation status
- Apparently Secure (NatureServe)

Scientific classification
- Kingdom: Plantae
- Clade: Embryophytes
- Clade: Tracheophytes
- Clade: Angiosperms
- Clade: Eudicots
- Clade: Asterids
- Order: Lamiales
- Family: Orobanchaceae
- Genus: Agalinis
- Species: A. edwardsiana

Binomial name
- Agalinis edwardsiana Pennell

= Agalinis edwardsiana =

Species of flowering plant

Agalinis edwardsiana is a flowering plant species in the family Orobanchaceae family with the common name plateau agalinis.

== Description ==
Agalinis edwardsiana is a sparsely bushy herb that grows up to 40 centimeters tall. It has narrowly linear leaves and small but showy pale pink to purple flowers that arise singly on short stems from leaf nodes.

== Range and habitat ==
Agalinis edwardsiana is native to the Edwards Plateau in Texas, where it grows on limestone and thin limestone-derived soils.

== Gallery ==
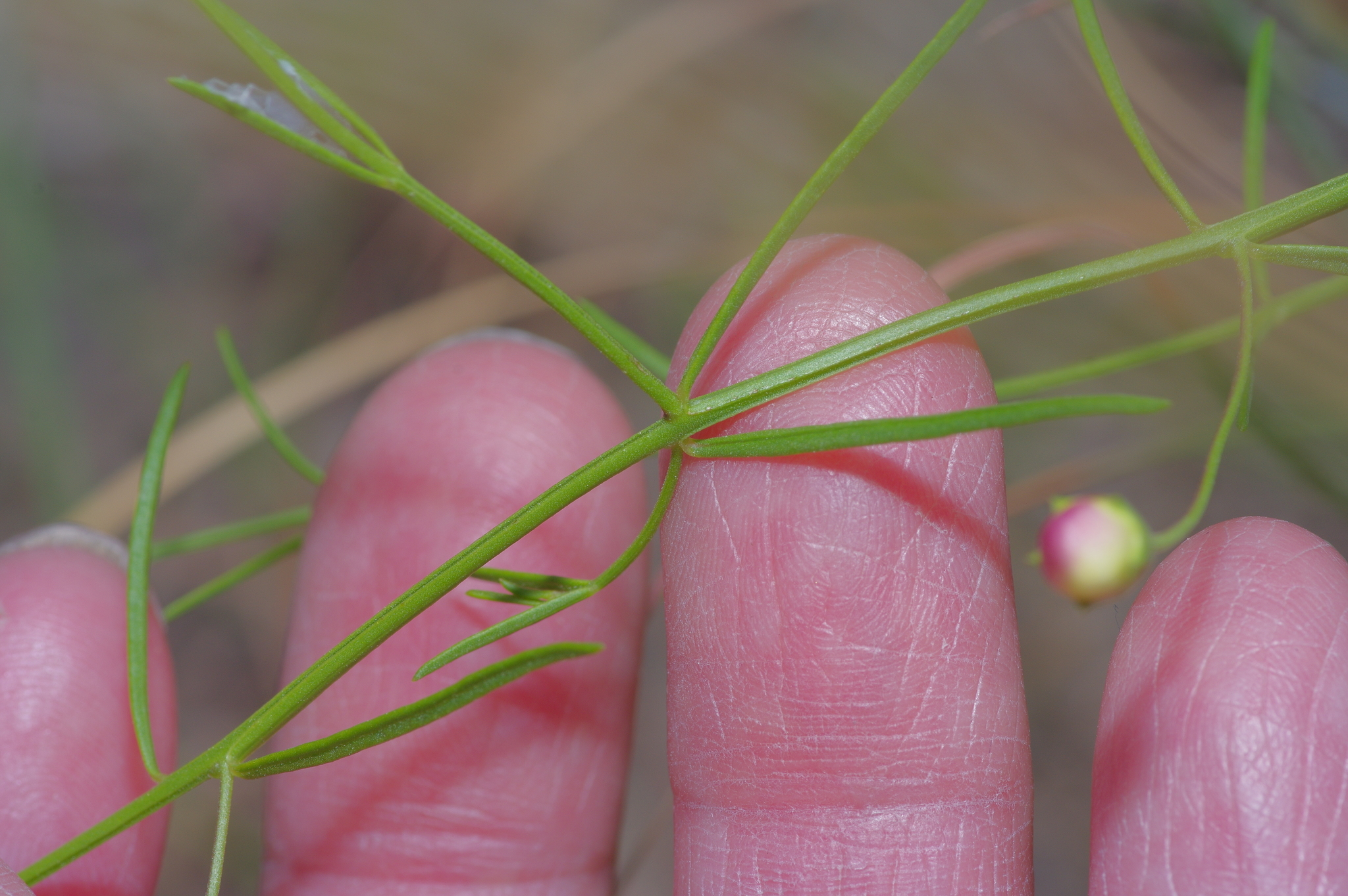
Agalinis edwardsiana foliage
