= Agalinis obtusifolia =

Scientific classification
- Kingdom: Plantae
- Clade: Tracheophytes
- Clade: Angiosperms
- Clade: Eudicots
- Clade: Asterids
- Order: Lamiales
- Family: Orobanchaceae
- Genus: Agalinis
- Species: A. obtusifolia

Binomial name
- Agalinis obtusifolia Raf.

Species of flowering plant

Agalinis obtusifolia, commonly known as tenlobe false foxglove, is an annual plant native to the southeast region of the United States of America. It is considered to be parasitic to the roots of herbaceous species.

== Description ==
Agalinis obtusifolia is light yellow to green in color. The stems are slender and stiff, and may reach a height between 30 and 90 centimeters (11.81 to 35.43 inches). The leaves are filiform and oppositely arranged, reaching a length of 5 to 15 millimeters. The flowers possess five petals, which tend to be pink, purple, or (rarely) white in color.

== Distribution and habitat ==
This species can be found across the United States' Coastal Plain region, its range stretching from Delaware to Florida and westward to Louisiana. There exist some disjunct populations within the states of Tennessee and Kentucky.

Agalinis obtusifolia has been observed to occur in habitat types including upland pine communities, peaty areas, flatwoods, and savannas, among other types.
