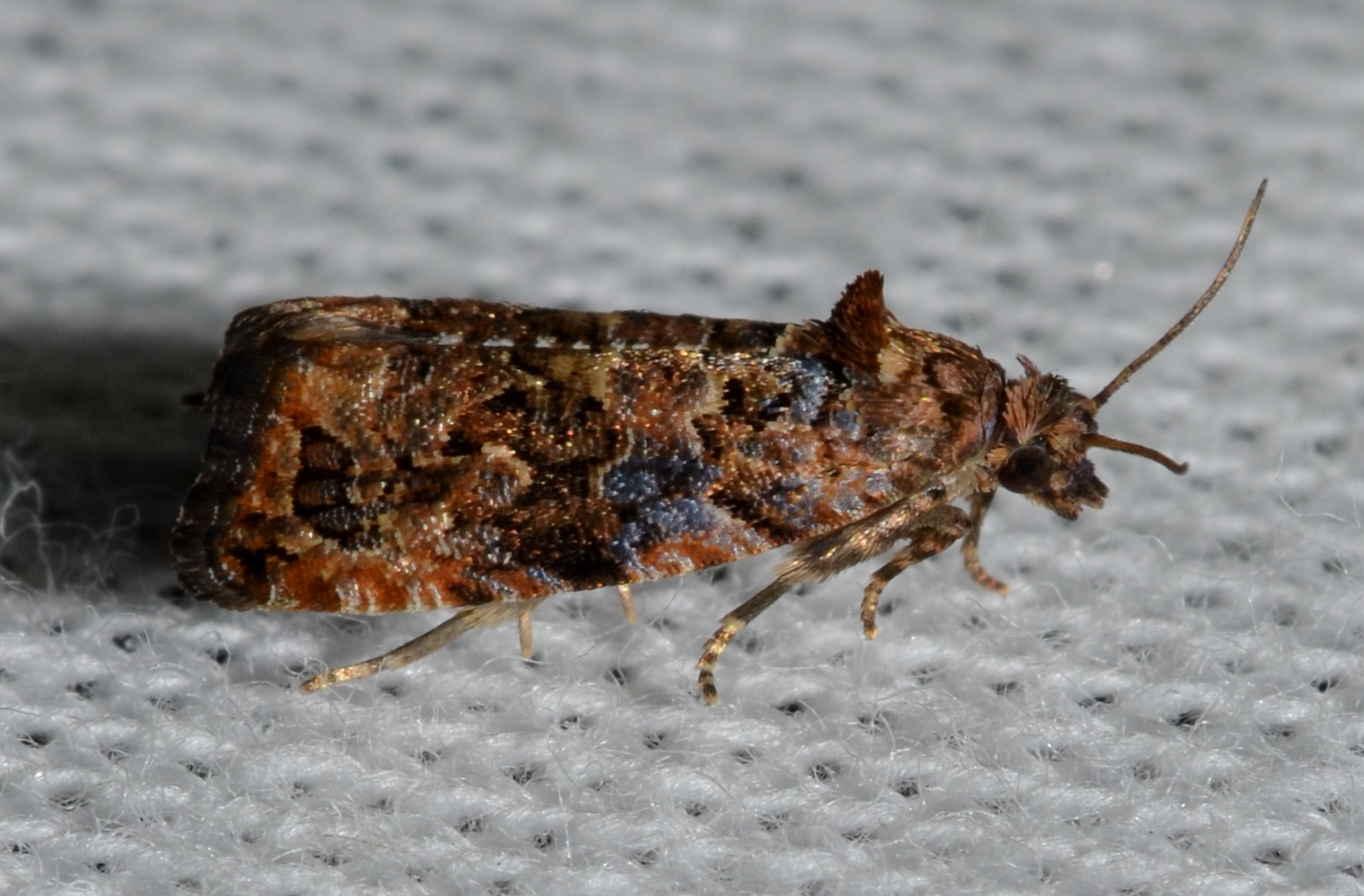

Scientific classification
- Kingdom: Animalia
- Phylum: Arthropoda
- Class: Insecta
- Order: Lepidoptera
- Family: Tortricidae
- Genus: Endothenia
- Species: E. hebesana

Binomial name
- Endothenia hebesana (Walker, 1863)

Synonyms
- Sciaphila hebesana Walker, 1863; Endothenia adustana Krogerus, 1947; Olethreutes daeckeana Kearfott, 1907; Endothenia fillerea Kuznetzov, 1993; Penthina fullerea Riley, in Fuller, 1869; Endothenia inexpectana Kuznetzov, 1993; Carpocapsa inexpertana Walker, 1863; Endothenia kiyosatoensis Kawabe, 1980; Argyroploce torquata Meyrick, 1927; Endothenia toteniana Opheim, 1972

= Endothenia hebesana =

Species of moth

Endothenia hebesana, the verbena bud moth, is a species of moth of the family Tortricidae. It is found in North America, where it has been recorded from Massachusetts, New York, New Jersey, Pennsylvania, Maryland, Virginia, North Carolina, Florida, Texas, Ohio, Indiana, Missouri, California, British Columbia, Alberta, Manitoba and Ontario. The habitat consists of black spruce-sphagnum bogs.

The length of the forewings is 5-8.2 mm for both sexes. The forewings vary from dusky brown to clay. Adults are on wing from late April to mid-June in one or multiple generations per year depending on the latitude.

The larvae feed on the seeds of Antirrhinum, Gentiana, Gerardia, Iris, Orthocarpus, Penstemon, Physostegia, Solidago, Stachys, Teucrium, Tigridia, Verbascum, Verbena, Veronica, Sarracenia, Scrophularia and Scutellaria species. There are five larval instars. Instars four and five overwinter in the flower stalks of the host plant. Pupation takes place in late May.
