= Agalinis kingsii =

Conservation status
- Critically Endangered (IUCN 3.1)

Scientific classification
- Kingdom: Plantae
- Clade: Tracheophytes
- Clade: Angiosperms
- Clade: Eudicots
- Clade: Asterids
- Order: Lamiales
- Family: Orobanchaceae
- Genus: Agalinis
- Species: A. kingsii

Binomial name
- Agalinis kingsii Proctor

Species of flowering plant

Agalinis kingsii is a species of false foxglove that is endemic to the Grand Cayman in the Cayman Islands. It occurs in the southern margins of the Salina Reserve sedge wetlands and within the Central Mangrove Wetland. This species is hemi-parasitic. It is threatened by quarry activities close to its habitat.
