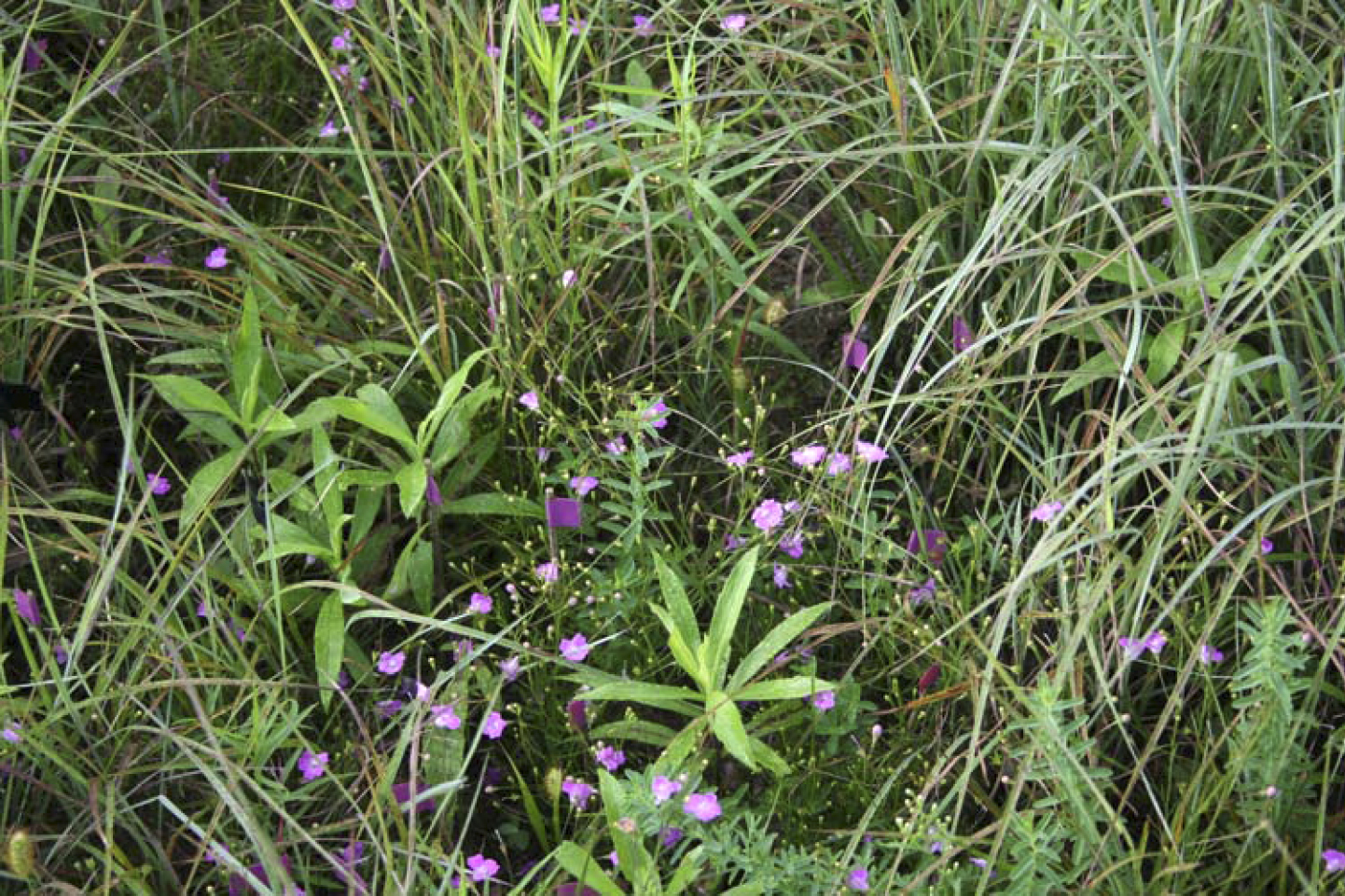

Conservation status
- Critically Imperiled (NatureServe)

- Endangered (ESA)

Scientific classification
- Kingdom: Plantae
- Clade: Tracheophytes
- Clade: Angiosperms
- Clade: Eudicots
- Clade: Asterids
- Order: Lamiales
- Family: Orobanchaceae
- Genus: Agalinis
- Species: A. acuta

Binomial name
- Agalinis acuta Pennell

= Agalinis acuta =

Species of flowering plant

Agalinis acuta is an annual hemiparasitic plant native to Maryland, Massachusetts, Rhode Island, Connecticut, and Long Island, New York. Common names include sandplain gerardia and sandplain false foxglove. It is one of about 70 species that comprise genus Agalinis. It currently resides within the family Orobanchaceae, but historically was aligned with members of the Scrophulariaceae. This was one of several re-alignments that were the consequence of the disintegration of the Scrophulariaceae as the result of conclusions based on molecular phylogeny data from the chloroplast genome. While historically regarded as a separate species, molecular phylogenetic data indicates that Agalinis acuta should be consolidated as part of the species Agalinis decemloba.

Agalinis acuta received federal protection on public lands upon being listed as in 1988 under the Endangered Species Act. Threats to extinction mentioned in the report listing the species were those that are characteristics of most threatened species; habitat fragmentation, lack of regulatory mechanisms protecting the species, and overexploitation for commercial or academic purposes.

This annual herb grows up to 35 or 40 centimetres (14 or 16 in) tall. The leaves are linear in shape, up to 2.5 centimetres (0.98 in) long and one millimeter wide. Flowers are borne on pedicels one or two centimeters long. Each flower has a hairy tubular calyx of sepals with triangular lobes. The flower corolla is up to 1.3 centimeters long with a tubular throat and rounded, notched lobes. It is pink with a red-spotted white throat. Flowers occur in late summer and early fall, and the flower withers after one day, often less than a full day. The flowers are self-compatible.

This plant occurs in sandy coastal plain habitat in poor, dry soils. It is a member of sandplain grassland communities and openings in coniferous forest. It thrives in areas that have been disturbed by processes such as grazing or fire, clearing out most other vegetation. Two populations grow in cemeteries that are constantly landscaped.

There are 22 or 23 occurrences, the population numbers fluctuating year to year. The species is threatened by the loss of its habitat to development, and alteration of remaining habitat. The plant requires open space on clear ground, and it does not do well if litter and vegetation builds up or trees grow and form a shady canopy. Some populations of the plant are actually tended by allowing sheep to graze in their habitat.
