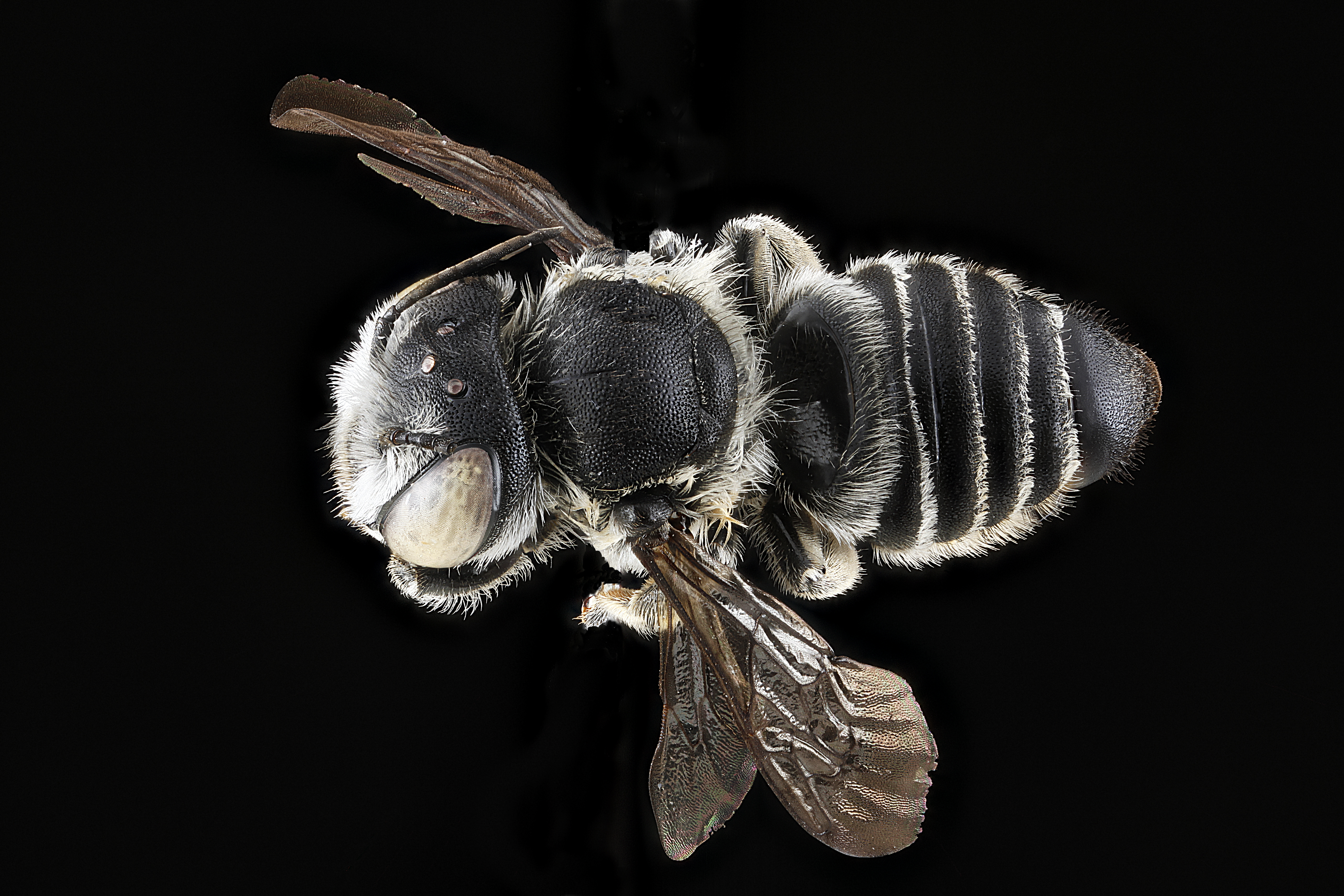

Scientific classification
- Domain: Eukaryota
- Kingdom: Animalia
- Phylum: Arthropoda
- Class: Insecta
- Order: Hymenoptera
- Family: Megachilidae
- Genus: Megachile
- Species: M. pseudobrevis

Binomial name
- Megachile pseudobrevis Mitchell, 1936

= Megachile pseudobrevis =

Species of leafcutter bee (Megachile)

Megachile pseudobrevis, the southeastern little leaf-cutter bee, is a species of hymenopteran in the family Megachilidae.
