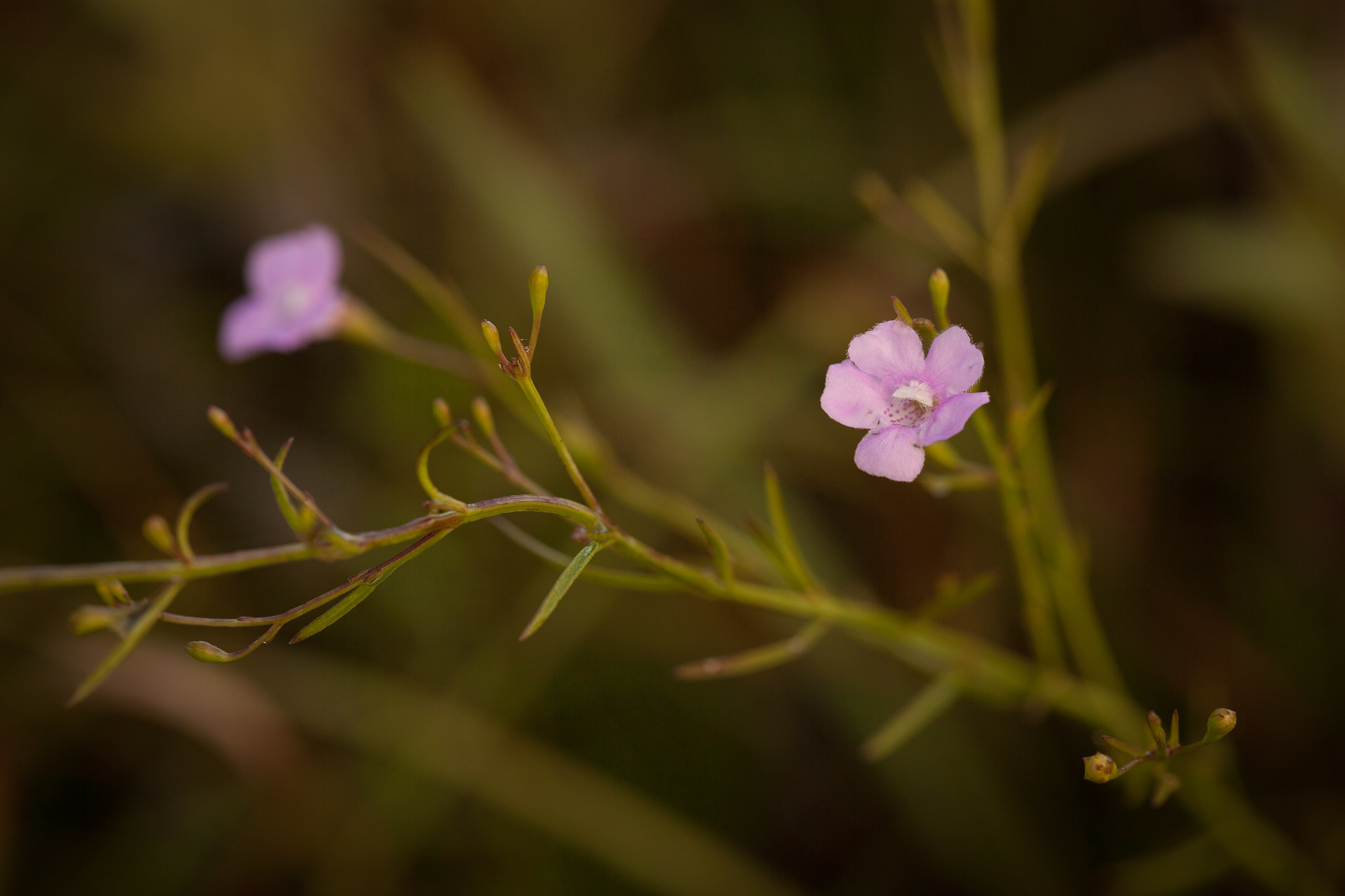

Conservation status
- Apparently Secure (NatureServe)

Scientific classification
- Kingdom: Plantae
- Clade: Tracheophytes
- Clade: Angiosperms
- Clade: Eudicots
- Clade: Asterids
- Order: Lamiales
- Family: Orobanchaceae
- Genus: Agalinis
- Species: A. gattingeri

Binomial name
- Agalinis gattingeri (Small) Small

Synonyms
- Gerardia gattingeri Small

= Agalinis gattingeri =

Species of flowering plant

Agalinis gattingeri, the roundstem false foxglove, is an annual hemiparasitic forb measuring between 10.5 and 60.5 cm in height.

== Description ==
Agalinis gattingeri is an annual species with upright, slender, round stems which are hairless. The stems end with many or few branches. The narrow-linear leaves measure 10 to 34 mm in length by 0.4 to 1 mm in width. The leaves are shorter that the pedicels. It has pinkish, tubular flowers, blooming through late summer and fall, that are 7– 30 mm in length with numerous red spots and two yellow lines on the lower lip. Single flowers often arise terminally on branches rather than on the stem. The five lobed flowers have two upper lobes that are smaller and more united than the larger three lower lobes. The seed capsules are rounded, with numerous yellow to tan seeds that measure 0.5 to 1.2 mm in length.

== Habitat ==
Agalinis gattingeri grows in drier areas of remnant prairies and alvar. In Minnesota it grows in hillside prairies in rocky and sandy soils that are dry, sunny and south facing.

== Conservation status ==
Populations are declining across much of the plant's range, especially in its northern portion, where Agalinis gattingeri is listed as threatened or endangered in many of the states and provinces in which it occurs. Prior to 2007, it was unknown in Manitoba, where there is a single known population, and in Ontario it is restricted to nine sites in the southern portion of the province. Its chief threats are habitat loss and human encroachment.
