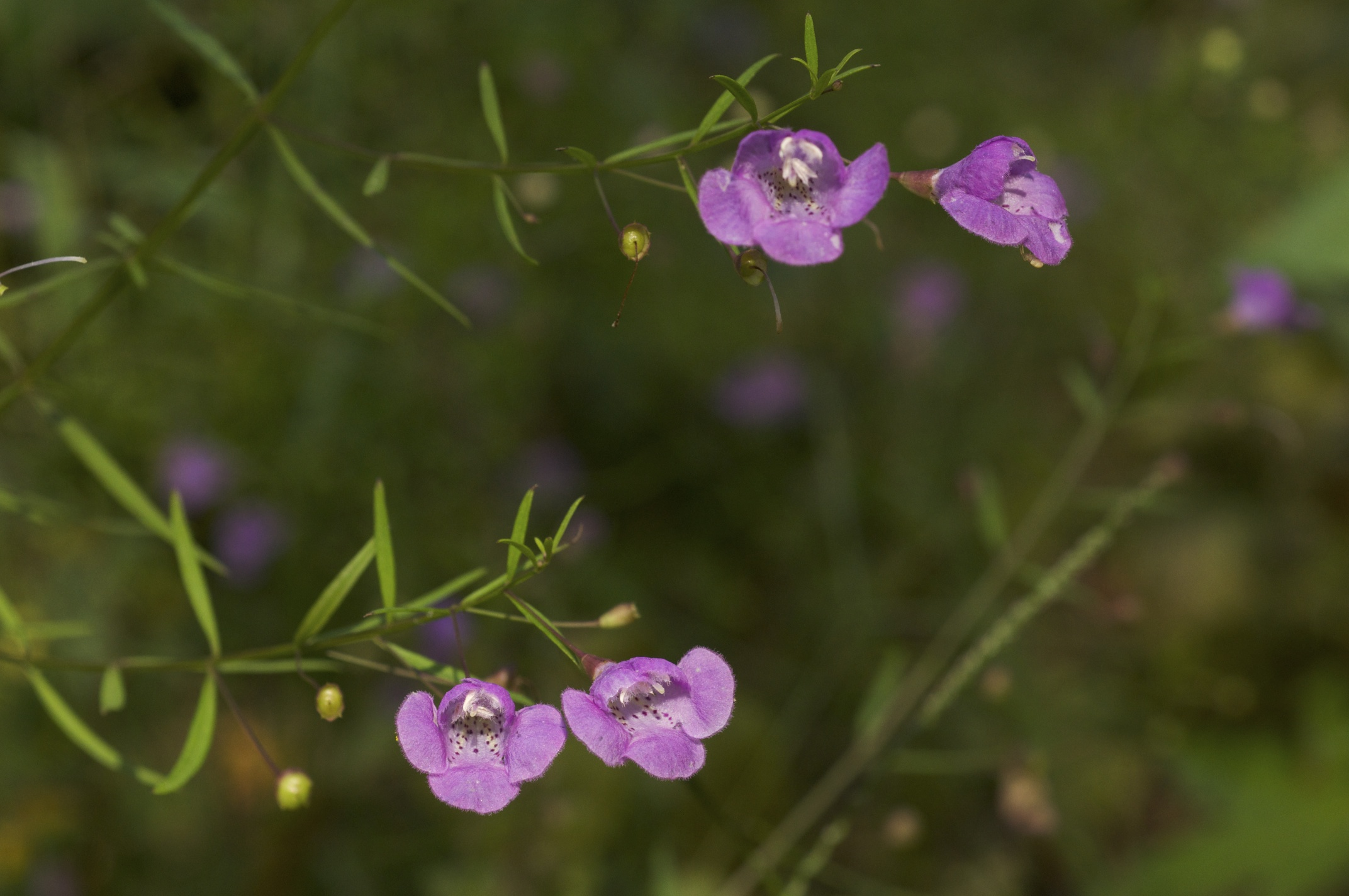

Conservation status
- Secure (NatureServe)

Scientific classification
- Kingdom: Plantae
- Clade: Tracheophytes
- Clade: Angiosperms
- Clade: Eudicots
- Clade: Asterids
- Order: Lamiales
- Family: Orobanchaceae
- Genus: Agalinis
- Species: A. tenuifolia

Binomial name
- Agalinis tenuifolia (Vahl) Raf.

Synonyms
- Agalinis besseyana Britton; Aureolaria tenuifolia (Vahl) Farw.; Chytra anomala C.F.Gaertn.; Gerardia besseyana Britton; Gerardia erecta Walter; Gerardia filiformis Raf. ex Benth.; Gerardia leucanthera Raf.; Gerardia macrophylla Benth.; Gerardia polyphylla Small; Gerardia tenuifolia Vahl

= Agalinis tenuifolia =

Species of flowering plant

Agalinis tenuifolia, known by the common names common gerardia, slender false foxglove or common false foxglove, is an annual forb native to the eastern and southwestern United States, and Canada, which produces purple flowers in late summer or early fall.

== Description ==
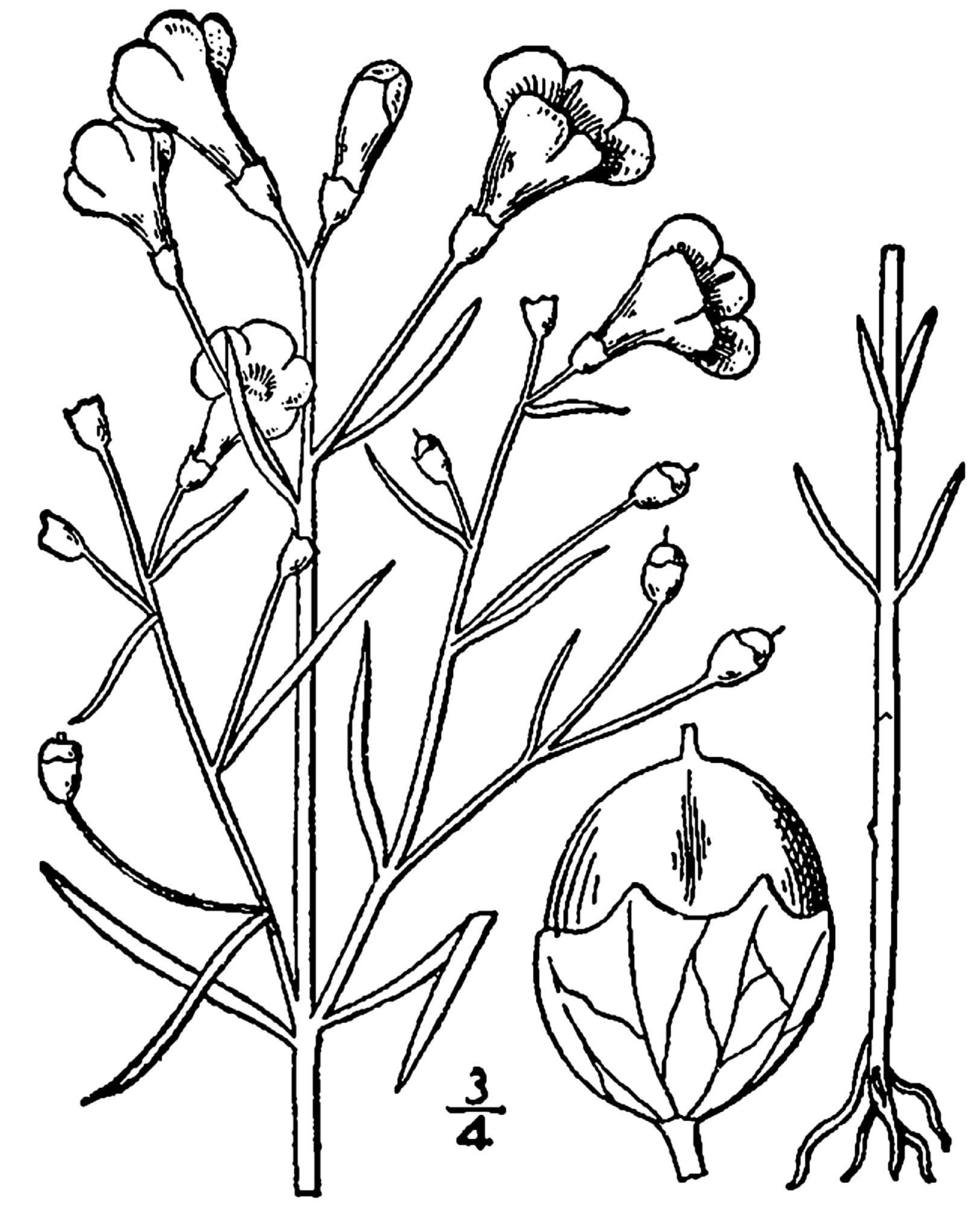
Botanical illustration of Agalinis tenuifolia (1913)

Agalinis tenuifolia is 20 to 60 centimeters tall, with a slender, paniculately branched stem. Its simple opposite leaves are 20 to 50 millimeters long, and only 1 to 3.5 millimeters wide. The flowers are borne on 10 to 20 millimeter long pedicels. Each flower is bilaterally symmetrical, with five 10 to 15 millimeter long petals fused into a corolla tube, and four stamens. The fruit is a round 3 to 7 millimeter long dry capsule that splits open when ripe.

== Distribution and habitat ==
Agalinis tenuifolia is widely distributed in the eastern United States and Canada, although local distribution may be spotty. It has been recorded in the states of Alabama, Arkansas, Colorado, Connecticut, Washington, D.C., Delaware, Florida, Georgia, Iowa, Illinois, Indiana, Kansas, Kentucky, Louisiana, Massachusetts, Maryland, Maine, Michigan, Minnesota, Missouri, Mississippi, North Carolina, North Dakota, Nebraska, New Hampshire, New Jersey, New Mexico, New York, Ohio, Oklahoma, Pennsylvania, Rhode Island, South Carolina, South Dakota, Tennessee, Texas, Virginia, Vermont, Wisconsin, West Virginia, and Wyoming, as well as the Canadian provinces of Manitoba, New Brunswick, Ontario, and Quebec. Agalinis tenuifolia is listed as a species of special concern in the state of Rhode Island. In Virginia it grows in habitats including dry woods and barrens, but particularly in open disturbed areas such as old fields, however, in Michigan, it grows in moist or even marshy ground, including river banks. The presence of this species is dependent on appropriate habitat, and it may be eliminated from an area by development, changes in land use, or competition with invasive species.

== Ecology ==
Like other members of the genus Agalinis, this species is hemiparasitic on a variety of hosts, particularly graminoids. Agalinis tenuifolia uses haustoria to connect its roots with those of its host plants, but it also has green tissues, and performs photosynthesis.

== Taxonomy ==
This species is a member of the genus Agalinis, which was formerly placed in the family Scrophulariaceae, but has more recently been placed in the family Orobanchaceae, in keeping with the findings of the Angiosperm Phylogeny Group.
