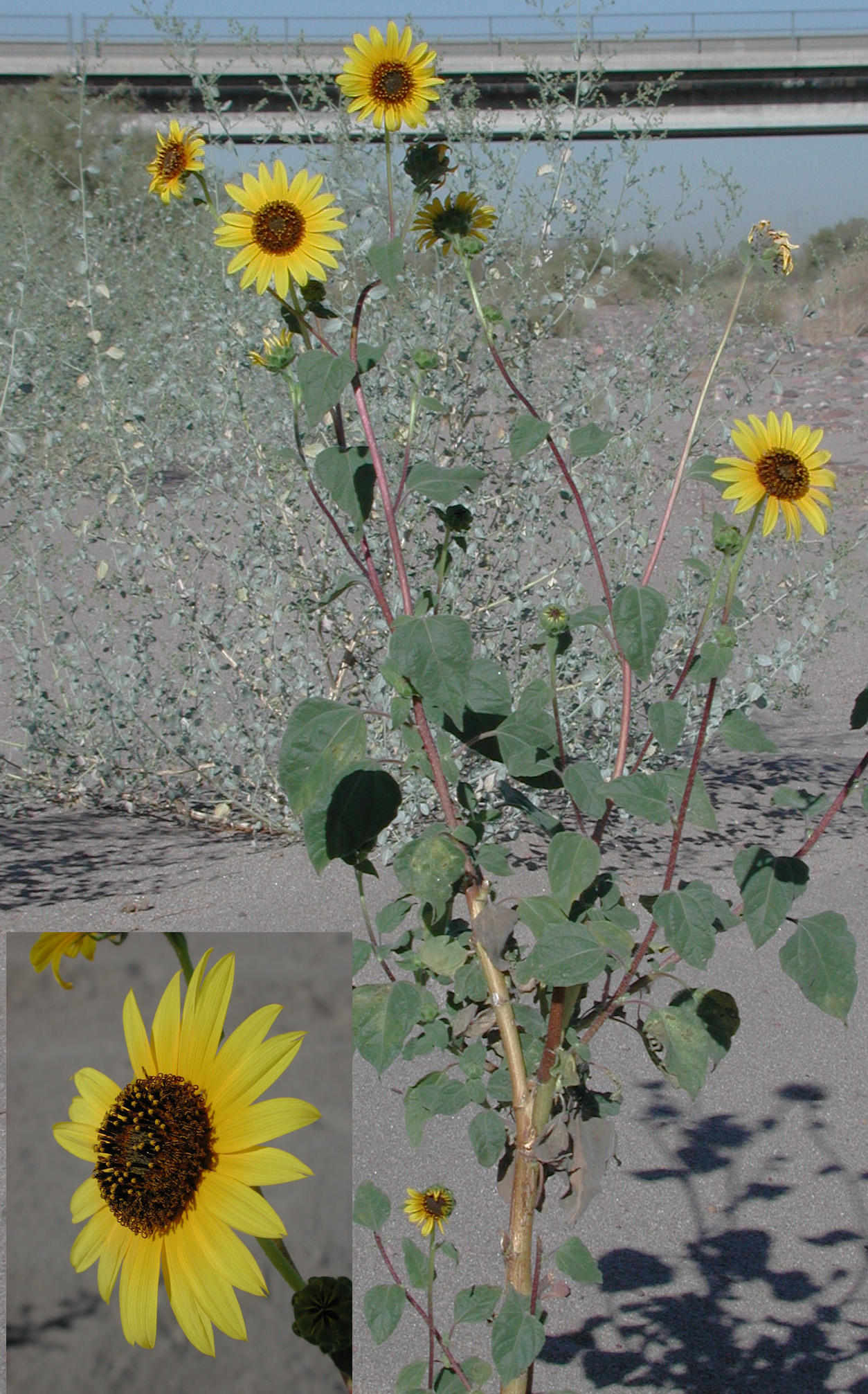

Conservation status
- Vulnerable (IUCN 3.1)

Scientific classification
- Kingdom: Plantae
- Clade: Tracheophytes
- Clade: Angiosperms
- Clade: Eudicots
- Clade: Asterids
- Order: Asterales
- Family: Asteraceae
- Tribe: Heliantheae
- Genus: Helianthus
- Species: H. anomalus

Binomial name
- Helianthus anomalus S.F.Blake

= Helianthus anomalus =

Species of sunflower

Helianthus anomalus, the western sunflower, is a species of plants in the family Asteraceae, found in the southwestern United States.

Helianthus anomalus is of particular interest due to its genetics. It was produced via hybridization of two other sunflower species, H. annuus and H. petiolaris, multiple times between approximately 60,000 and 200,000 years ago. From these two parent plants, three hybrids were formed, each with distinct characteristics and habitat preferences.

== Distribution ==
Helianthus anomalus is found in the United States in Arizona, New Mexico, Nevada and Utah. Both H. anomalus hybrids are subject to stressful ecological conditions. They grow in sand dune habitats, which have limited access to nitrogen and water, and are thus considered stressful environments. Helianthus anomalus is native to these states, not introduced.

== Habitat and ecology ==
Helianthus anomalus has unique traits that allows it to thrive in its stressful sand dune environment. Helianthus anomalus has a high leaf succulence, which allows it to survive long periods of drought common to its habitat. The succulent leaves of the sunflower stores water in absorbent, spongy portions of the leaves. Helianthus anomalus also has large seeds and rapid root growth, which contribute to its ability to survive in its extreme environment. It is believed that large seeds are adaptive to dune plants because the large seed size prevents burial by the sand. Helianthus anomalus is an annual plant. It is classified as Vulnerable in its native range and it is declining.

== Morphology, flowers and fruit ==
Individuals of this species can be recognized by their yellow flowers, with alternate oval shaped leaves. H. anomalus produces achenes for fruits. A 2001 study done on multiple species of Helianthus showed the average height of the plant to be 1.2m, with an average leaf length of 9.69 cm. Their average root length of 6.45 cm is an adaptation to their dry environment; they have to be able to acquire water from deep within the soil. The large size of their achenes facilitates this expanding root growth.

== Hybridization ==
Helianthus anomalus is of particular interest to biologists because it is a natural hybrid, meaning the species originated in nature from a hybridization of two other sunflowers. The parental flowers, H. annuus and H.petiolaris, are found in dramatically different environments. H annuus is found in clay based soils while H. petiolaris is found in sandier soils. The hybrid flower, H. anomalus, is able to inhabit such a different and stressful environment due to divergence in parental gene dominance. Common garden experiments of the parental and hybrid flowers show distinct preference to their different habitats.

== Applications in biotechnology ==
Helianthus anomalus has been considered a potential source of alternate fuel. The need for alternate fuel sources has been a pressing issue over the past ten years, and sunflower oil is one of the possible candidates. Among the 51 species of the genus Helianthus, H. anomalus shows promise because of its high oil concentration, linoleic fatty acid concentration and its large achenes.
