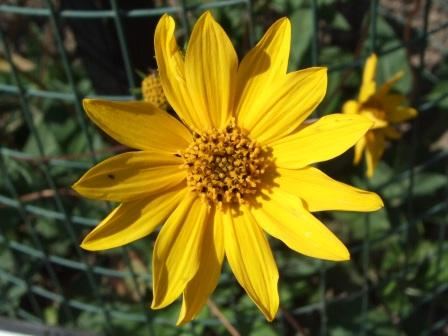

Scientific classification
- Kingdom: Plantae
- Clade: Tracheophytes
- Clade: Angiosperms
- Clade: Eudicots
- Clade: Asterids
- Order: Asterales
- Family: Asteraceae
- Tribe: Heliantheae
- Genus: Helianthus
- Species: H. occidentalis

Binomial name
- Helianthus occidentalis Riddell

Synonyms
- Helianthus dowellianus M.A.Curtis; Helianthus illinoensis Gleason

= Helianthus occidentalis =

Species of sunflower

Helianthus occidentalis (common names the fewleaf sunflower, nakedstem sunflower, or western sunflower) is a species of sunflower native to the Eastern and Central United States. It grows mostly in the Great Lakes Region and in the Ozarks, with additional populations scattered as far as Massachusetts, Texas, and the Florida Panhandle.

Helianthus occidentalis differs from other, similar species by its sparse leaves, most of which are crowded around the lower part of the stem. This perennial plant reaches heights from 2 to 5 ft (60–150 cm). It produces one to several yellow flower heads, each with 8-14 ray florets surrounding more than 50 disc florets.

The word occidentalis means "western" in Latin. The plant was first described in 1836, when the Great Lakes Region was considered the western part of the United States.

Subspecies

- Helianthus occidentalis subsp. occidentalis - most of species range
- Helianthus occidentalis subsp. plantagineus (Torr. & A.Gray) Shinners - Texas, Arkansas
