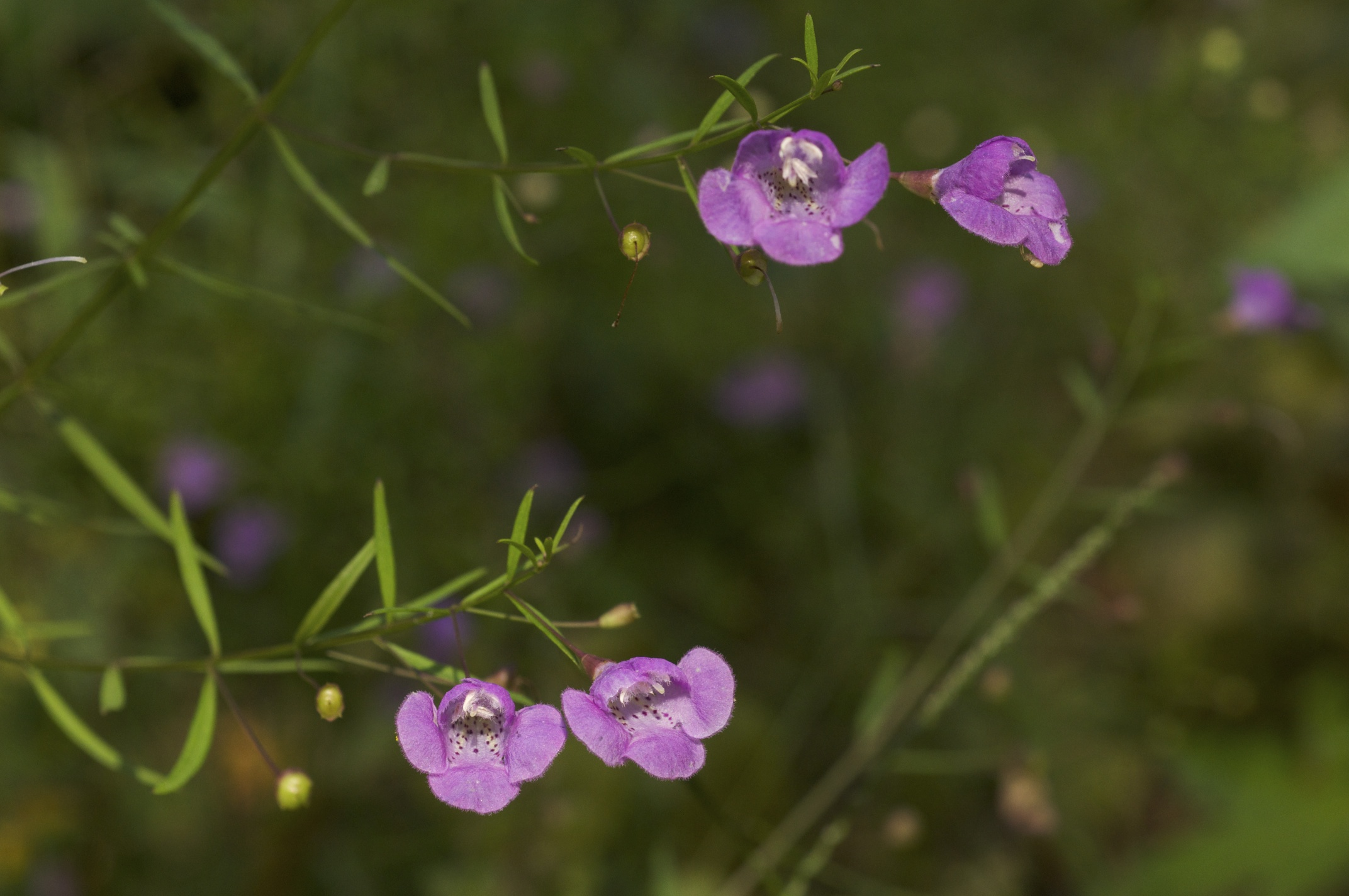
- Agalinis tenuifolia

Scientific classification
- Kingdom: Plantae
- Clade: Tracheophytes
- Clade: Angiosperms
- Clade: Eudicots
- Clade: Asterids
- Order: Lamiales
- Family: Orobanchaceae
- Tribe: Pedicularideae
- Genus: Agalinis; Raf.

Species
- About 70; see text

Synonyms
- Chytra C.F.Gaertn.; Gerardia Benth.; Otophylla Benth.; Tomanthera Raf.; Virgularia Ruiz & Pav.; Schizosepala G.M.Barroso

= Agalinis =

Genus of flowering plants in the broomrape family

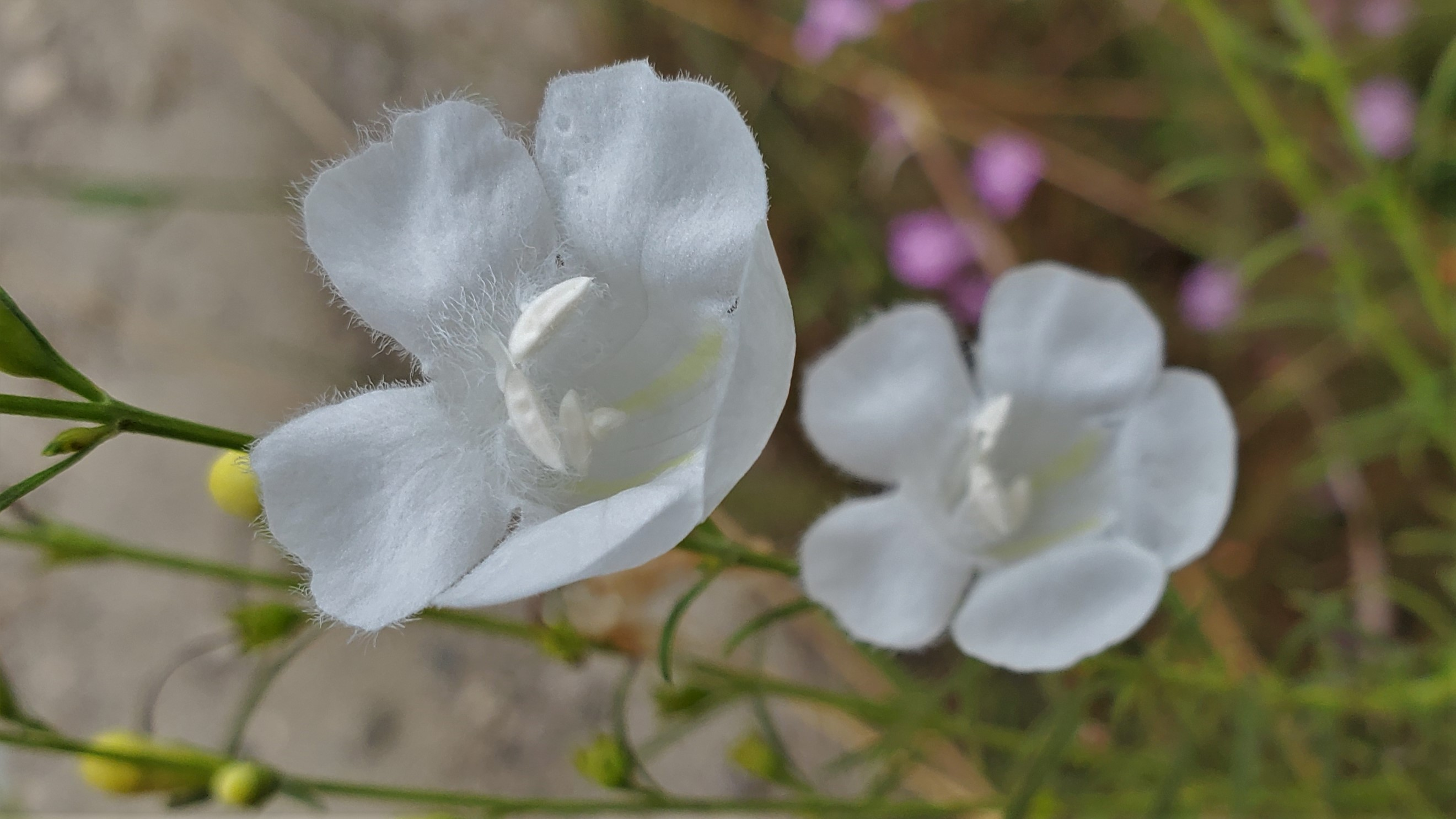
White Agalanis purpurea

Agalinis (false foxglove) is a genus of about 70 species in North, Central, and South America that until recently was aligned with members of the family Scrophulariaceae. As a result of numerous molecular phylogenetic studies based on various chloroplast DNA (cpDNA) loci, it was shown to be more closely related to members of the Orobanchaceae. Agalinis species are hemiparasitic, which is a character that in part describes the Orobanchaceae.

The first detailed study of this genus began with Francis W. Pennell around 1908, and his earliest major publication of the North American members of this genus appeared in 1913. Dr. Judith Canne-Hilliker began to revise Pennell's treatment in 1977. Her taxonomic, anatomical, and developmental studies have greatly enhanced our understanding of this sometimes perplexing group. In particular, her studies of the seed surfaces using electron microscopy has shown that the seeds are diagnostic for delimiting species and has resulted in a realignment of Pennell's classification of the group. In the 1990s Gregg Dieringer investigated the reproductive ecology of several Agalinis spp., to include the self-incompatible Agalinis strictifolia and the autogamous bee-visited Agalinis skinneriana. Much remains to be studied in this regard, however.

One species of Agalinis, Agalinis acuta, is federally listed. This is mainly due to continued habitat loss within its historically known range. There are a number of species in North America that are ranked at the state and federal level. However, many of the species considered rare are ranked at the state level and represent species on the periphery of their range. There are a number of rare (and endemic) species that are not noted at the state or federal level, and the biogeography of this group in North America has yet to be studied in detail, and is poorly understood.

== Species ==
The following species are recognised in the genus Agalinis:

Agalinis acuta	sandplain false foxglove
Agalinis angustifolia	
Agalinis aphylla	scaleleaf false foxglove
Agalinis aspera	harsh stem false foxglove
Agalinis auriculata	earleaf false foxglove
Agalinis bandeirensis	
Agalinis bangii	
Agalinis brachyphylla	
Agalinis brevifolia	
Agalinis caddoensis	Caddo false foxglove
Agalinis calycina	Leoncita false foxglove
Agalinis chaparensis	
Agalinis communis	
Agalinis decemloba	ten-lobed false foxglove
Agalinis densiflora	Osage false foxglove
Agalinis digitalis	
Agalinis divaricata	pineland false foxglove
Agalinis edwardsiana	Edward's Plateau false foxglove
Agalinis fasciculata	tall false foxglove
Agalinis fiebrigii	
Agalinis filicaulis	delicate false foxglove
Agalinis filifolia	Florida false foxglove
Agalinis flexicaulis	
Agalinis gattingeri	Midwest false foxglove
Agalinis genistifolia	
Agalinis georgiana	Georgia false foxglove
Agalinis glandulosa	
Agalinis gypsophila	
Agalinis harperi	Gulf Coastal Plain false foxglove
Agalinis heterophylla	prairie false foxglove
Agalinis homolantha	San Antonio false foxglove
Agalinis humilis	
Agalinis itambensis	
Agalinis kingsii	
Agalinis lanceolata	
Agalinis laxa	long-pediceled false foxglove
Agalinis linarioides	
Agalinis linifolia	perennial false foxglove
Agalinis manglaris	
Agalinis marianae	
Agalinis maritima	saltmarsh false foxglove
Agalinis megalantha	
Agalinis meyeniana	
Agalinis nana	
Agalinis navasotensis	Navasota false foxglove
Agalinis neoscotica	Nova Scotia false foxglove
Agalinis obtusifolia	variable false foxglove
Agalinis oligophylla	ridgestem false foxglove
Agalinis pennellii	
Agalinis plukenetii	chattahoochee false foxglove
Agalinis pulchella	savanna false foxglove
Agalinis purpurea	purple false foxglove
Agalinis ramosissima	
Agalinis ramulifera	
Agalinis reflexidens	
Agalinis scarlatina	
Agalinis schwackeana	
Agalinis setacea	threadleaf false foxglove
Agalinis skinneriana	Skinner's false foxglove
Agalinis stenantha	
Agalinis strictifolia	clasping false foxglove
Agalinis tarijensis	
Agalinis tenella	
Agalinis tenuifolia	slender false foxglove
Agalinis viridis	green false foxglove
