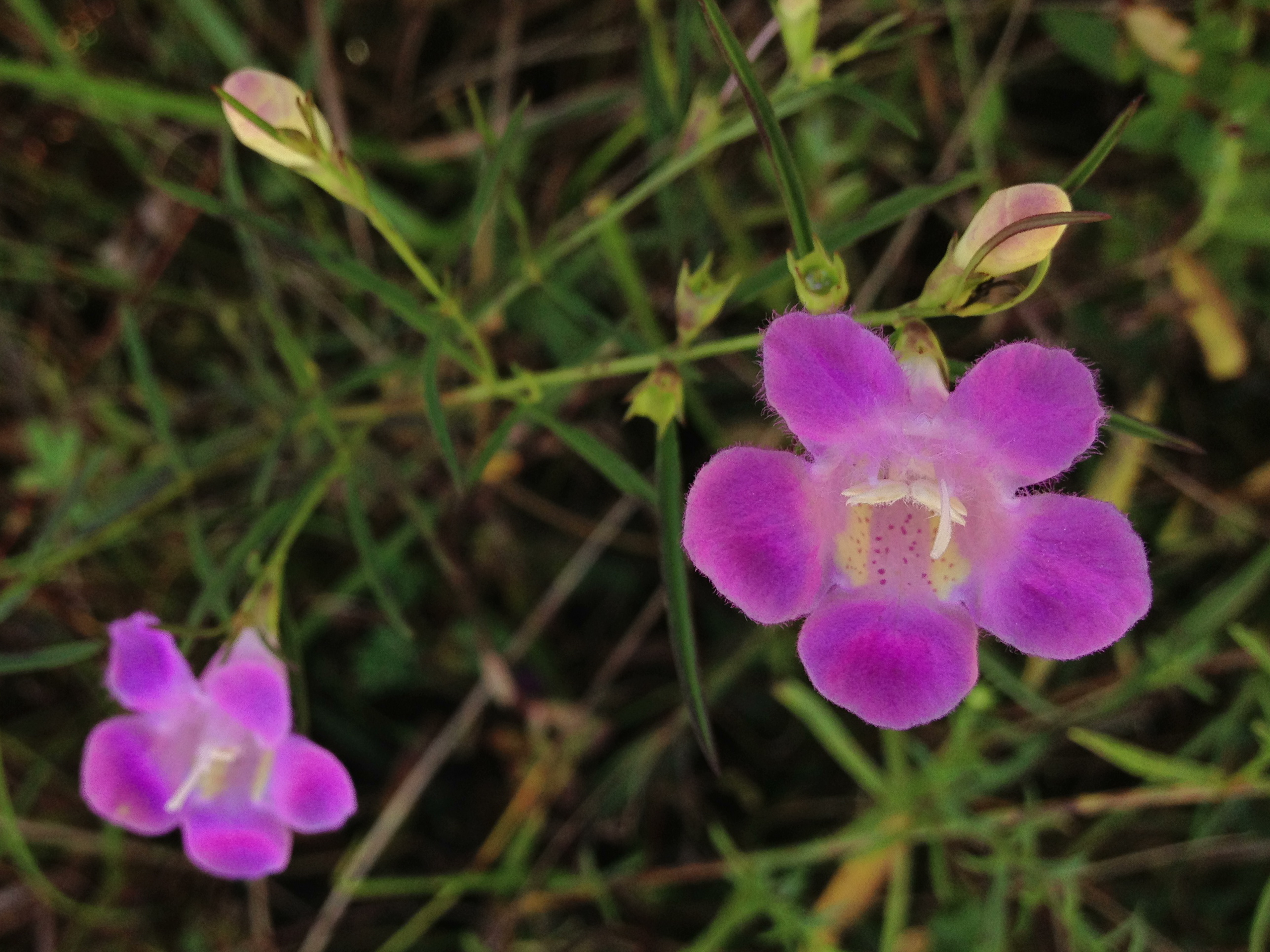

Conservation status
- Secure (NatureServe)

Scientific classification
- Kingdom: Plantae
- Clade: Tracheophytes
- Clade: Angiosperms
- Clade: Eudicots
- Clade: Asterids
- Order: Lamiales
- Family: Orobanchaceae
- Genus: Agalinis
- Species: A. purpurea

Binomial name
- Agalinis purpurea (L.) Pennell

Synonyms
- Agalinis purpurea var. chiapasana Pennell; Agalinis purpurea var. purpurea; Aureolaria purpurea (L.) Farw.; Gerardia purpurea L.

= Agalinis purpurea =

Species of flowering plant

Agalinis purpurea (known by common names including purple false foxglove and purple gerardia) is an annual forb native to the eastern United States and Canada, which produces purple flowers in late summer or early fall.

== Description ==
Agalinis purpurea is 10 to 120 centimetres (3.9 to 47.2 in) tall. The stem is slender, with spreading branches. It has simple opposite leaves, which are 10 to 40 millimeters long, and only 0.5 to 2 millimeters wide. The flowers are racemose on the branches. They are borne on 1 to 8 millimeter long pedicles. Each flower is bilaterally symmetrical, with five 20 to 38 millimeter long petals fused into a corolla tube, and four stamens. The fruit is a round 4 to 6 millimeter long dry capsule that splits open when ripe.

== Distribution and habitat ==
Agalinis purpurea is widely distributed in the eastern United States, although local distribution may be spotty. It has been recorded in Alabama, Arkansas, Connecticut, Washington, D.C., Delaware, Florida, Georgia, Iowa, Illinois, Indiana, Kansas, Kentucky, Louisiana, Massachusetts, Maryland, Michigan, Minnesota, Missouri, Mississippi, North Carolina, Nebraska, New Hampshire, New Jersey, New York, Ohio, Pennsylvania, Rhode Island, South Carolina, Tennessee, Texas, Virginia, Wisconsin, and West Virginia. It has also been recorded in the Canadian province of Ontario. In Virginia, it grows in habitats such as marshes, swamps, interdune swales, and old fields. The presence of this species is dependent on appropriate habitat, and it may be eliminated from an area by development, changes in land use, or competition with invasive species.

== Ecology ==
Like other members of the genus Agalinis, this species is hemiparasitic on a variety of hosts, particularly graminoids. Agalinis purpurea uses haustoria to connect its roots with those of its host plants, but it also has green tissues, and performs photosynthesis.

== Taxonomy ==
This species is a member of the genus Agalinis, which was formerly placed in the family Scrophulariaceae, but has more recently been placed in the family Orobanchaceae, in keeping with the findings of the Angiosperm Phylogeny Group.
