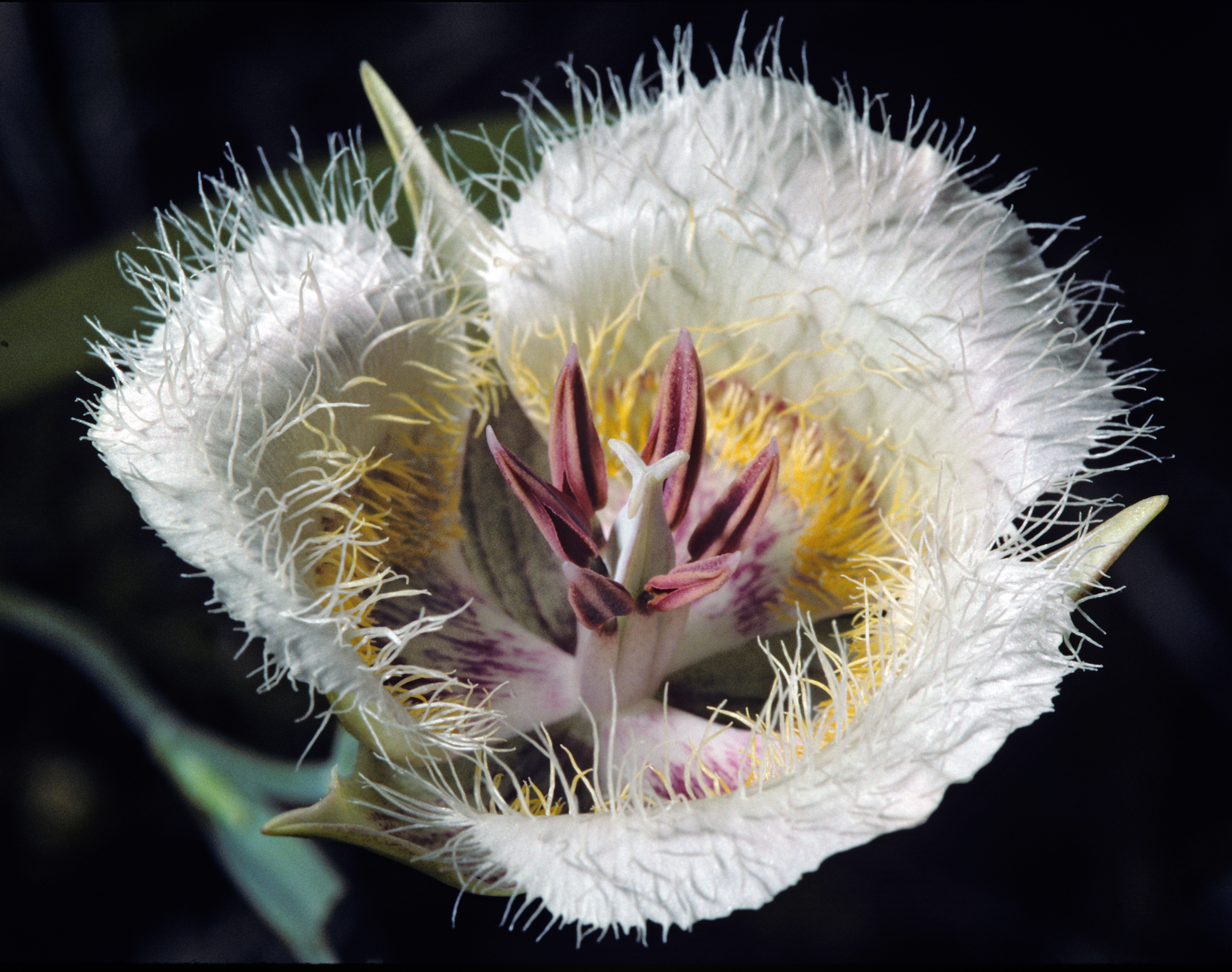

Conservation status
- Critically Imperiled (NatureServe)

Scientific classification
- Kingdom: Plantae
- Clade: Tracheophytes
- Clade: Angiosperms
- Clade: Monocots
- Order: Liliales
- Family: Liliaceae
- Genus: Calochortus
- Species: C. coxii

Binomial name
- Calochortus coxii M.Godfrey & F.Callahan

= Calochortus coxii =

Species of flowering plant

Calochortus coxii is a rare species of flowering plant in the lily family known by the common names Cox's mariposa lily and crinite mariposa lily. It is endemic to Oregon in the United States, where it is known only from Douglas County.

This rare plant was first described in 1988. It is a perennial herb growing 15 to 25 centimeters tall. The narrow leaves are up to 30 centimeters long and have hairy upper surfaces and hairless, shiny undersides. The inflorescence contains 1 to 7 showy bell-shaped flowers with petals up to 2.5 centimeters long. They are white with red striping and a large lavender spot at the base. The insides of the petals are coated in long yellow and white hairs. The fruit is a three-winged capsule measuring 3 to 4 centimeters long and containing beige seeds. Blooming occurs in mid-summer. When the plant is dormant between flowering seasons, it takes the form of a single leaf remaining above the ground.

This plant is limited to serpentine soils in the Klamath Mountains of southern Oregon. There are about eight occurrences on a serpentine ridge about 30 miles long, located in the South Umpqua River drainage. All the occurrences make up one single metapopulation. The habitat is meadows and the ecotone between grass-forb meadows and mixed coniferous forest. The plant grows in undisturbed habitat covered in litter and moss. The overstory is composed of Pinus jeffreyi, Pseudotsuga menziesii, Calocedrus decurrens, and Arbutus menziesii. Other forbs in the habitat may include Perideridia oregana, Lomatium nudicaule, Madia madioides, M. elegans, Achillea millefolium, Cryptantha intermedia, Minuartia douglasii, Silene hookeri, Cerastium viscosum, Lotus micranthus, Luzula campestris, Epilobium minutum, Aspidotis densa, Githopsis specularioides, Ranunculus occidentalis, Sedum stenopetallum, Mimulus guttatus, Collinsia grandiflora, Castilleja tenuis, Toxicoscordion venenosum, Plectritis congesta, Phacelia capitata, and Viola hallii.

Threats to this plant include fire suppression, which prevents a natural fire regime that would normally exclude larger plants from the open meadow habitat and ecotone. The species is native to a very fire-prone habitat, with hot, dry summers and many lightning-sparked wildfires in a normal season. The plant is expected to become rarer as fire suppression continues in its habitat. Other threats include degradation of the habitat by invasive species of plants such as Centaurea solstitialis, the yellow starthistle. Other noxious weeds in the habitat include Chondrilla juncea (rush skeletonweed), Taeniatherum caput-medusae (medusahead), and Cirsium arvense (Canada thistle). Logging has caused damage to the habitat via soil disruption; however, careful selective logging may clear some of the overgrowth caused by fire suppression. Livestock grazing injures the leaves of the rare plant, reducing its reproductive potential. Plants may now be limited to ungrazed sites. Mining, road construction, off-road vehicle use, and horticultural collecting are also threats. Herbivory by native wildlife and insects may cause the loss of buds and other plant parts.
