= C. tinctoria =

C. tinctoria may refer to:

- Carthamus tinctorius, or safflower, a thistle-like annual plant
- Chromodoris tinctoria, a colorful sea slug species
- Chrozophora tinctoria, a plant species
- Cladrastis tinctoria, Kentucky yellowwood, a flowering plant native to the Southeastern United States
- Collinsia tinctoria, the sticky Chinese house, a flowering plant species
- Collomia tinctoria, the staining collomia, a flowering plant species
- Coreopsis tinctoria, the plains coreopsis or calliopsis, an annual forb species
- Cota tinctoria, a perennial flowering plant in the sunflower family

== Synonyms ==
- Caesalpinia tinctoria or Coulteria tinctoria, two synonyms for Cæsalpinia spinosa, the tara tree, a small tree species native to Peru
- Coriaria tinctoria), a synonym for Coriaria myrtifolia

== See also ==
- Tinctoria
