= Ethmia scylla =

Scientific classification
- Kingdom: Animalia
- Phylum: Arthropoda
- Clade: Pancrustacea
- Class: Insecta
- Order: Lepidoptera
- Family: Depressariidae
- Genus: Ethmia
- Species: E. scylla

Binomial name
- Ethmia scylla Powell, 1973

Species of moth

Ethmia scylla is a moth in the family Depressariidae. It is in California, United States.

The length of the forewings is 5.8–7.2 mm (0.23–0.28 in). The ground color of the forewings is pale grayish brown, clouded and marked by whitish scaling. The ground color of the hindwings is gray-brown. Adults are on wing from late February to early April.

The larvae feed on Collinsia heterophylla. They feed in the flowers of their host plant.
