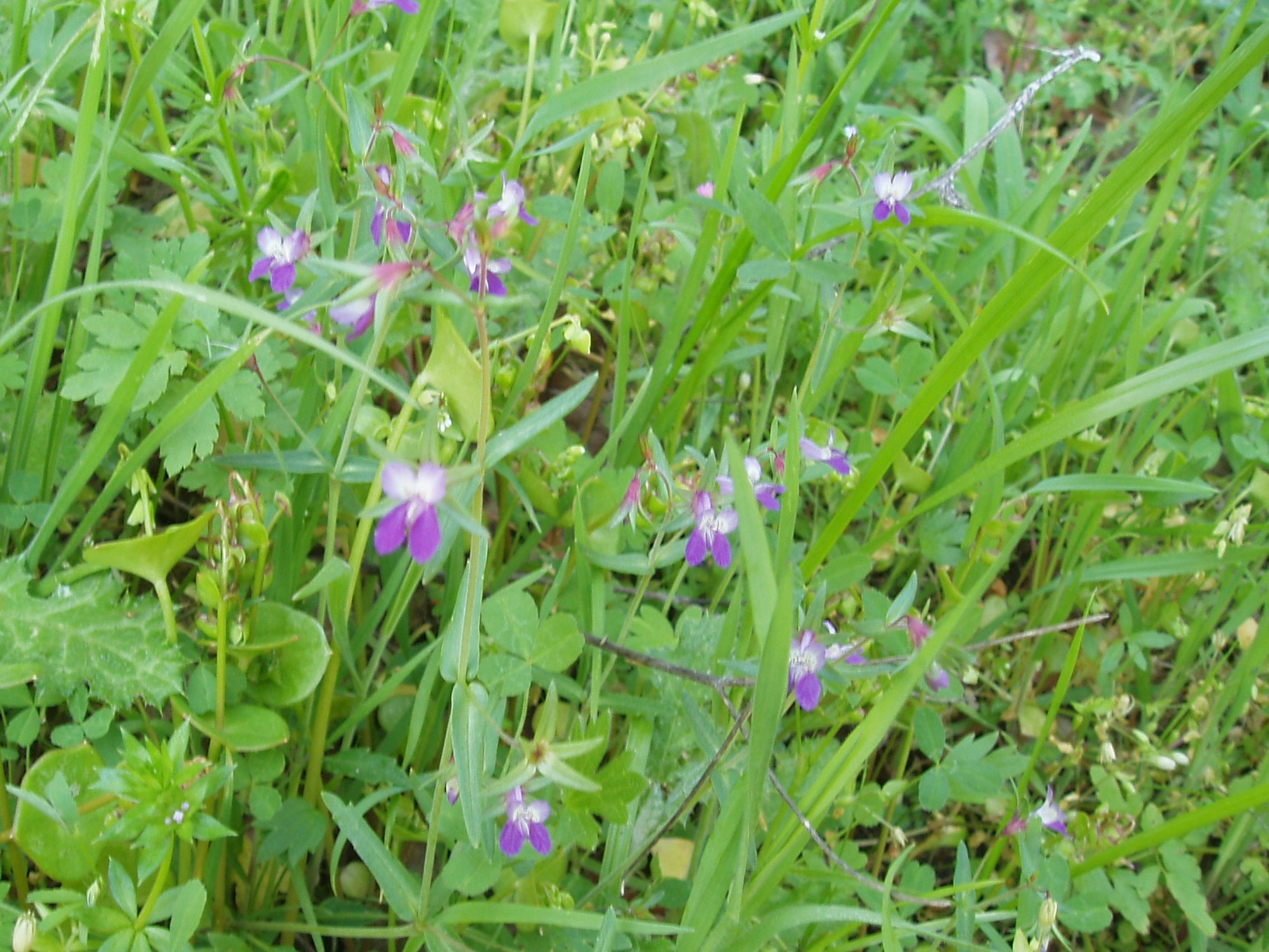

Scientific classification
- Kingdom: Plantae
- Clade: Tracheophytes
- Clade: Angiosperms
- Clade: Eudicots
- Clade: Asterids
- Order: Lamiales
- Family: Plantaginaceae
- Genus: Collinsia
- Species: C. sparsiflora

Binomial name
- Collinsia sparsiflora Fisch. & C.A.Mey.

= Collinsia sparsiflora =

Species of flowering plant

Collinsia sparsiflora is a flowering plant in the family Plantaginaceae known by the common names spinster's blue-eyed Mary and few-flowered collinsia. One variety of the species is native to the West Coast of the United States as far north as Washington, while the other three varieties are limited to California alone.

== Varieties ==
- Collinsia sparsiflora var. arvensis
- Collinsia sparsiflora var. bruceae
- Collinsia sparsiflora var. collina
- Collinsia sparsiflora var. sparsiflora

== Habitat ==
The plant grows in several types of habitat, including disturbed and cultivated areas. It has a weak affinity for serpentine soils, growing from sea-level to 5000'.

== Botany ==
It is an annual herb producing a slender, reddish stem up to 30 centimeters tall with an inflorescence of widely spaced nodes bearing one to three flowers each. The flower has very long, pointed sepals and purple, lavender, or occasionally white flowers. The fruit is a spherical, red-spotted capsule growing deep within the long sepals.

== Ecology ==
Colinsia sparsiflora has been found to host discrete populations of Acaulospora AM fungi (AMF (ecology)) on serpentine soil, Glomus on non-serpentine soil types.
