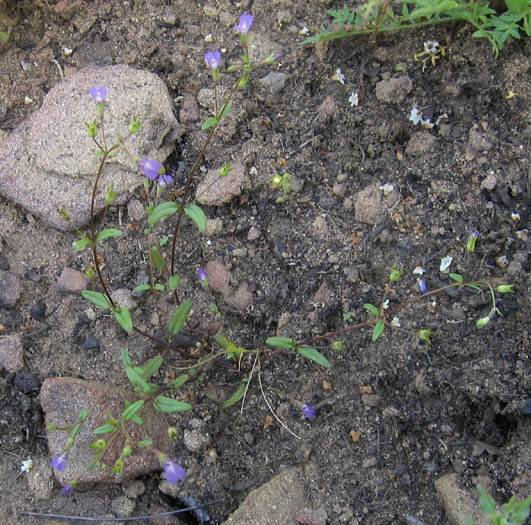

Conservation status
- Imperiled (NatureServe)

Scientific classification
- Kingdom: Plantae
- Clade: Tracheophytes
- Clade: Angiosperms
- Clade: Eudicots
- Clade: Asterids
- Order: Lamiales
- Family: Plantaginaceae
- Genus: Collinsia
- Species: C. parryi

Binomial name
- Collinsia parryi A.Gray

= Collinsia parryi =

Species of flowering plant

Collinsia parryi is a species of flowering plant in the plantain family known by the common name Parry's blue eyed Mary. It is endemic to central and southern California, where it is found in the southern Coast Ranges and in the Transverse Ranges north and east of Los Angeles.

This is an annual herb growing up to 40 centimeters tall with a spindly stem coated in fine hairs. The leaves are lance-shaped and may have dull teeth along the edges. Each flower is 4 to 10 millimeters long and is borne on a long pedicel.

The flower has lavender to purple, or occasionally white, lobes with minute hairs along the edges. The fruit is a capsule containing 8 to 12 seeds.
