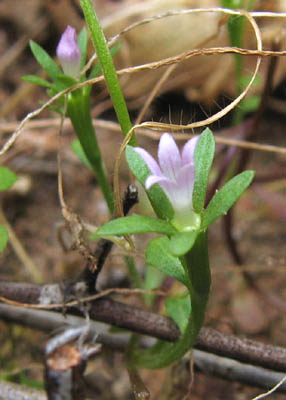
- Githopsis diffusa

Scientific classification
- Kingdom: Plantae
- Clade: Tracheophytes
- Clade: Angiosperms
- Clade: Eudicots
- Clade: Asterids
- Order: Asterales
- Family: Campanulaceae
- Subfamily: Campanuloideae
- Genus: Githopsis; Nutt.

= Githopsis =

Bluecups

Genus of plants

Githopsis is a small genus of flowering plants in the bellflower family which are known as bluecups. These are small annual wildflowers with white or purple white-throated blooms. Bluecups are native to western North America, especially California. There are four known species within the genus.

Species:

- Githopsis diffusa A.Gray - San Gabriel bluecup - California, Baja California, Guadalupe Island
- Githopsis pulchella Vatke - Sierra bluecup - Sacramento Valley of California
- Githopsis specularioides Nutt. - common bluecup - Vancouver Island, Washington, Oregon, California, northern Idaho, northwestern Montana
- Githopsis tenella Morin - tubeflower bluecup - California
