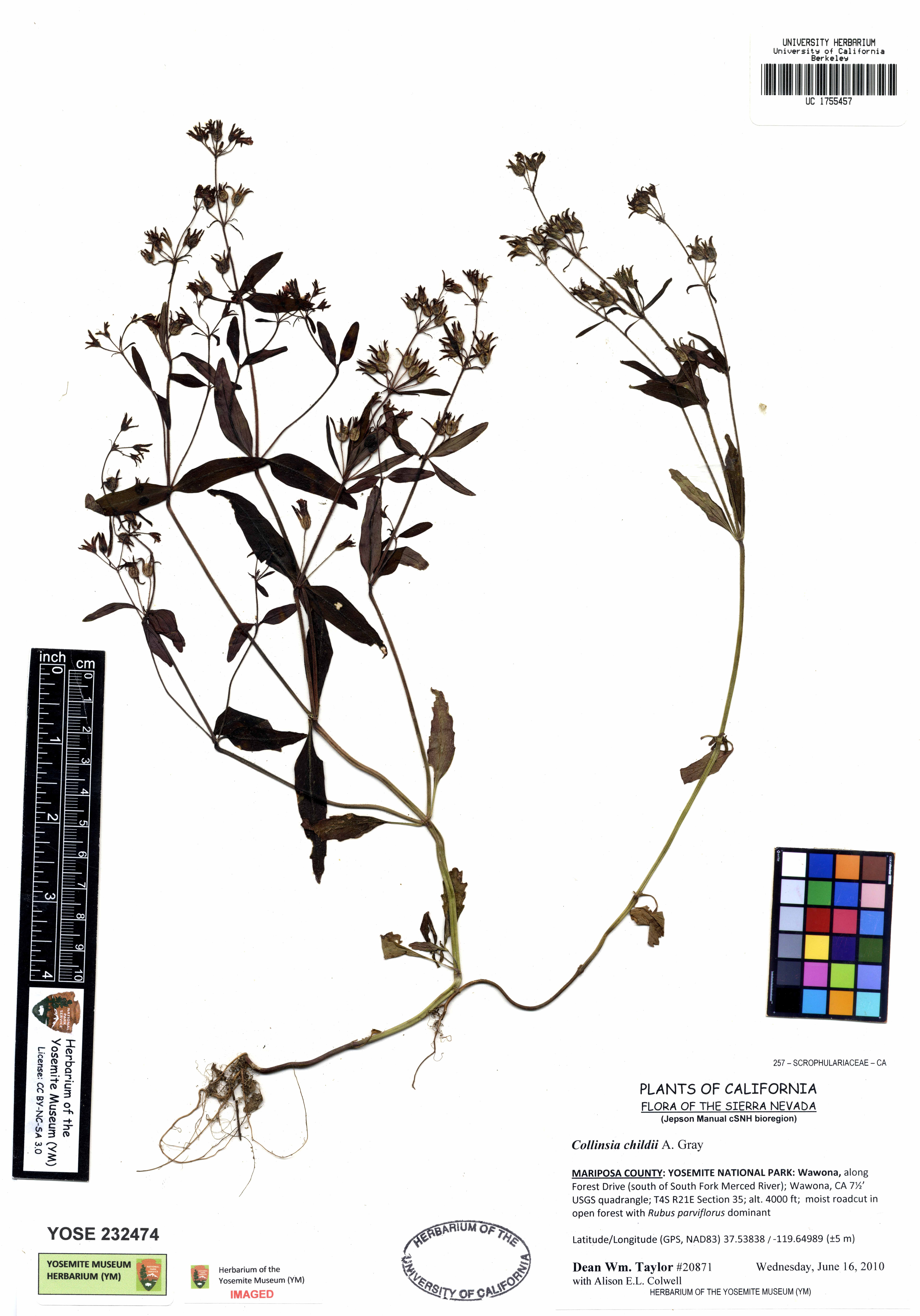

Scientific classification
- Kingdom: Plantae
- Clade: Tracheophytes
- Clade: Angiosperms
- Clade: Eudicots
- Clade: Asterids
- Order: Lamiales
- Family: Plantaginaceae
- Genus: Collinsia
- Species: C. childii

Binomial name
- Collinsia childii Parry ex A.Gray

= Collinsia childii =

Species of flowering plant

Collinsia childii is a species of flowering plant in the plantain family known by the common name Child's blue-eyed Mary.

It is endemic to California, where it grows in the mountains of the Sierra Nevada and the Southern Inner and Outer California Coast Range. It grows in woodland and shady forest habitats.

== Description ==
Collinsia childii is an annual herb producing an erect, branching stem up to about 35 centimeters tall coated in glandular hairs. The leaves are oblong, flat and sometimes slightly toothed.

The hairy gland-covered inflorescence bears flowers on erect pedicels, with several emerging from the leaf axils at interrupted nodes. Each flower has two upper lobes and three lower lobes and is pale lavender in color. The flower is under a centimeter long.
