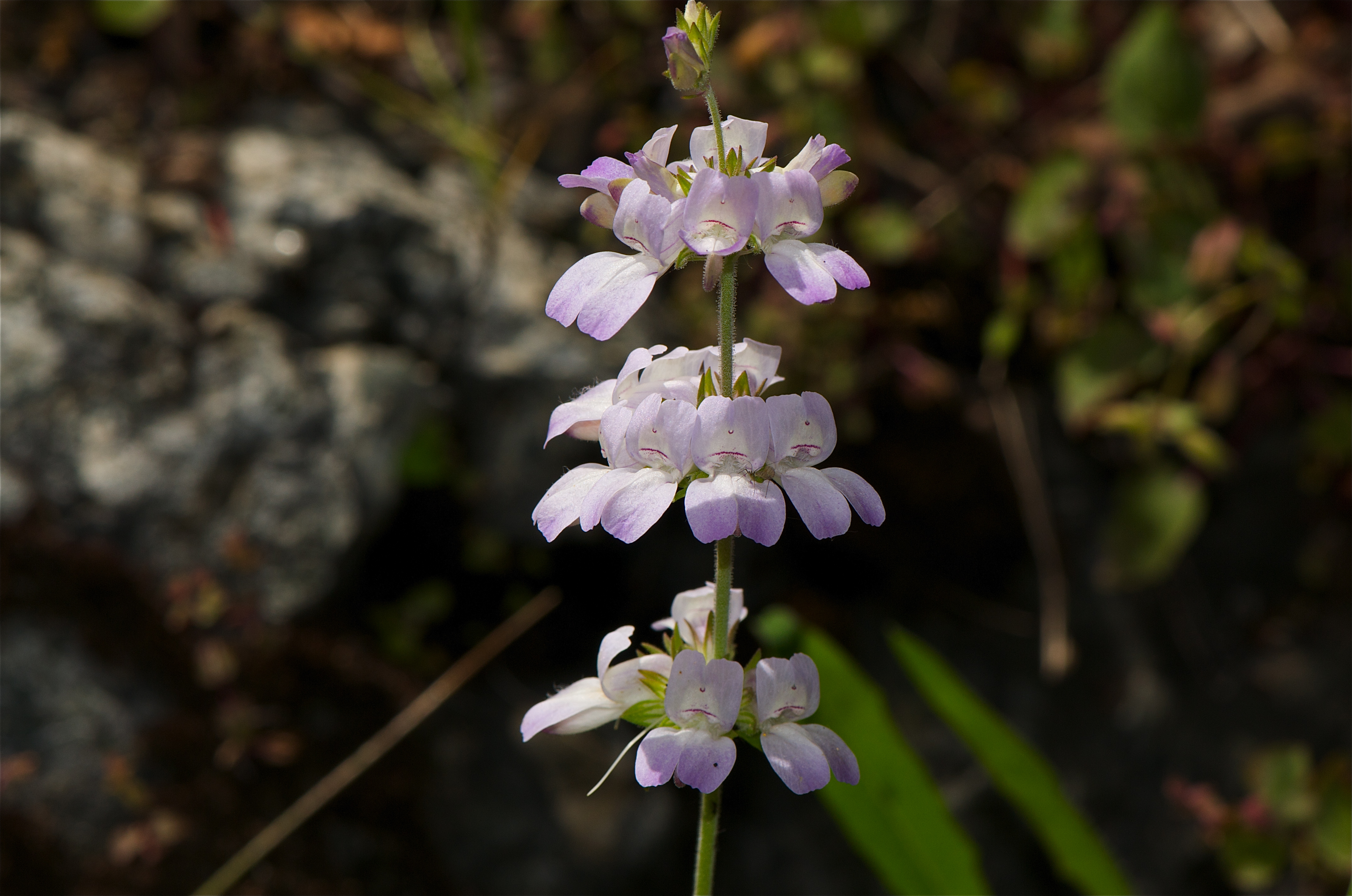

Scientific classification
- Kingdom: Plantae
- Clade: Tracheophytes
- Clade: Angiosperms
- Clade: Eudicots
- Clade: Asterids
- Order: Lamiales
- Family: Plantaginaceae
- Genus: Collinsia
- Species: C. bartsiifolia

Binomial name
- Collinsia bartsiifolia Benth.

= Collinsia bartsiifolia =

Species of flowering plant

Collinsia bartsiifolia is a species of flowering plant in the plantain family known by the common name white blue-eyed Mary.

It is endemic to California, where it is widespread in the mountain ranges and deserts and found in several habitat types.

== Description ==
Collinsia bartsiifolia is an annual herb producing a slender, hairy stem up to about 35 centimeters long. It is lined with a few thick, narrowly oblong leaves with edges slightly rolled under.

The inflorescence is an interrupted series of whorls of flowers. The flower is white to lavender to purple, sometimes bicolored, pouched and folded, with two toothed upper lobes and three notched lower lobes.
