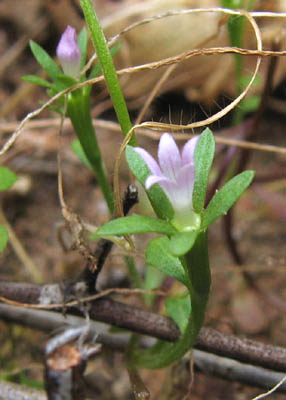

Scientific classification
- Kingdom: Plantae
- Clade: Tracheophytes
- Clade: Angiosperms
- Clade: Eudicots
- Clade: Asterids
- Order: Asterales
- Family: Campanulaceae
- Genus: Githopsis
- Species: G. diffusa

Binomial name
- Githopsis diffusa A.Gray

= Githopsis diffusa =

Species of flowering plant

Githopsis diffusa is a species of flowering plant in the bellflower family known by the common name San Gabriel bluecup.

It is native to California and Baja California, where it grows in open habitat on the slopes of foothills and mountains.

== Description ==
Githopsis diffusa is an annual herb forming a small clump at ground level or growing erect to a maximum height near 30 centimeters. The stem may have stiff hairs and the leaves are generally small and pointed.

The small, solitary flower appearing at the tip of the stem is tubular to funnel-shaped and white or purple with a white throat.
