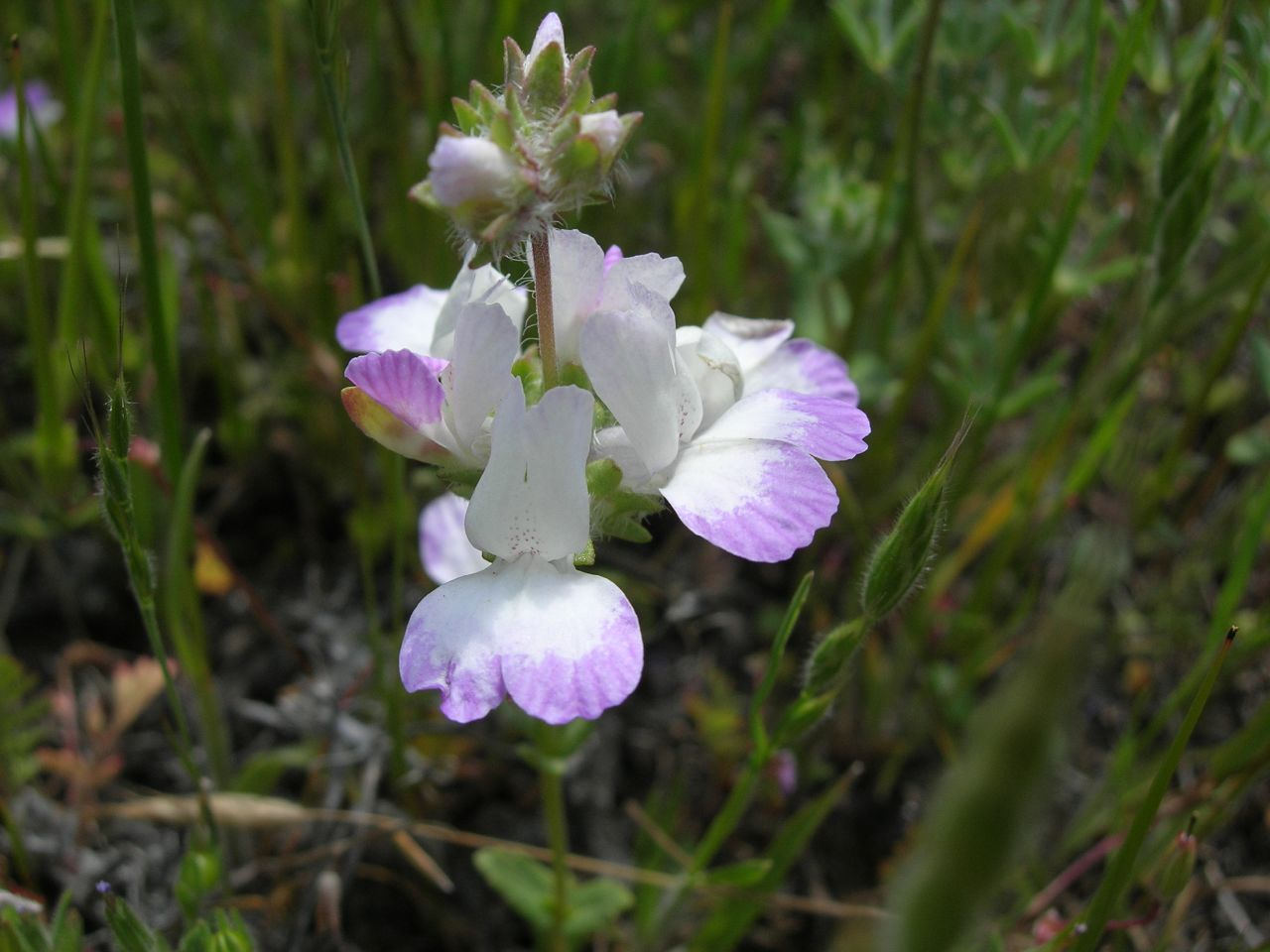

Scientific classification
- Kingdom: Plantae
- Clade: Tracheophytes
- Clade: Angiosperms
- Clade: Eudicots
- Clade: Asterids
- Order: Lamiales
- Family: Plantaginaceae
- Genus: Collinsia
- Species: C. callosa

Binomial name
- Collinsia callosa Parish

= Collinsia callosa =

Species of flowering plant

Collinsia callosa is a species of flowering plant in the plantain family known by the common name desert mountain blue-eyed Mary. It is endemic to California, where it grows in the mountains of the southernmost Sierra Nevada, the Transverse Ranges, and the mountains of the Mojave Desert region. It grows in desert scrub, chaparral, and woodland habitat on the mountain slopes.

This is an annual herb producing a fleshy, somewhat thick stem up to about 25 centimeters tall. The plant is overall green to red in color. The leaves are oblong and thick, their edges slightly rolled under. They are oppositely arranged and some pairs clasp the stem where they meet.

The inflorescence is an interrupted series of nodes bearing flowers; one to three flowers emerge on erect pedicels from the leaf axils. Each flower has two upper lobes and three lower lobes and is deep purple-blue in color, often with some white.
