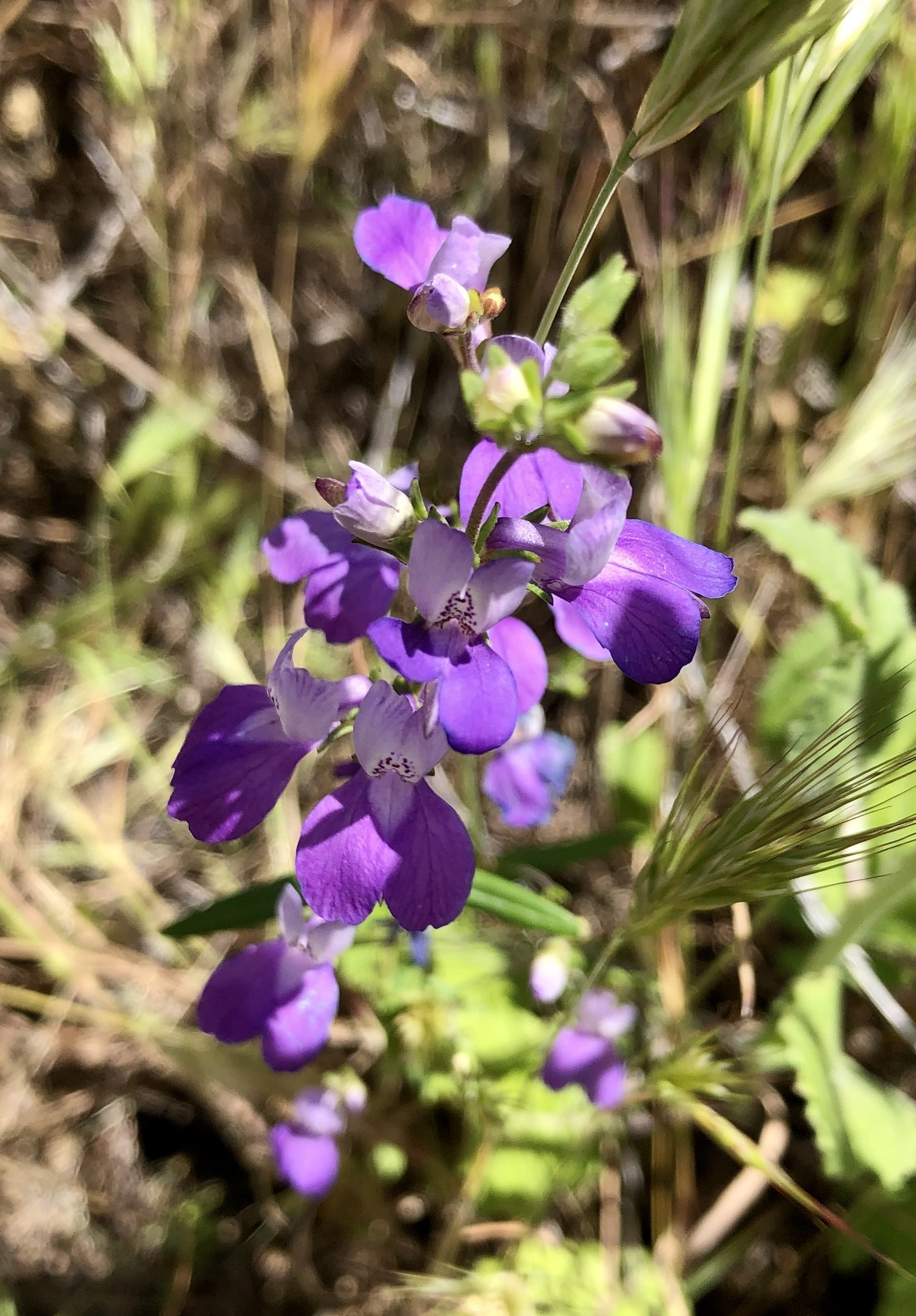

Scientific classification
- Kingdom: Plantae
- Clade: Tracheophytes
- Clade: Angiosperms
- Clade: Eudicots
- Clade: Asterids
- Order: Lamiales
- Family: Plantaginaceae
- Genus: Collinsia
- Species: C. concolor

Binomial name
- Collinsia concolor Greene

= Collinsia concolor =

Species of flowering plant

Collinsia concolor is a species of flowering plant in the plantain family known by the common name Chinese houses.

It is native to Southern California and Baja California. It grows in the woodlands and chaparral of the coastal mountain ranges, such as the Peninsular Ranges. Collinsia concolor is a host species for the Edith's checkerspot butterfly.

== Description ==
Collinsia concolor is an annual herb producing an erect stem up to about 45 centimeters tall. The leaves are oppositely arranged, each widely linear in shape, flat, and sometimes slightly toothed.

The hairy gland-covered inflorescence is an interrupted series of dense whorls of flowers. Each flower is 1 to 1.5 centimeters long, with a hairy base and a corolla divided into two upper lobes and three lower. The flower is blue to purple with a neatly purple-dotted white area on the upper lobes. The middle of the three lower lobes has a hairy tip.
