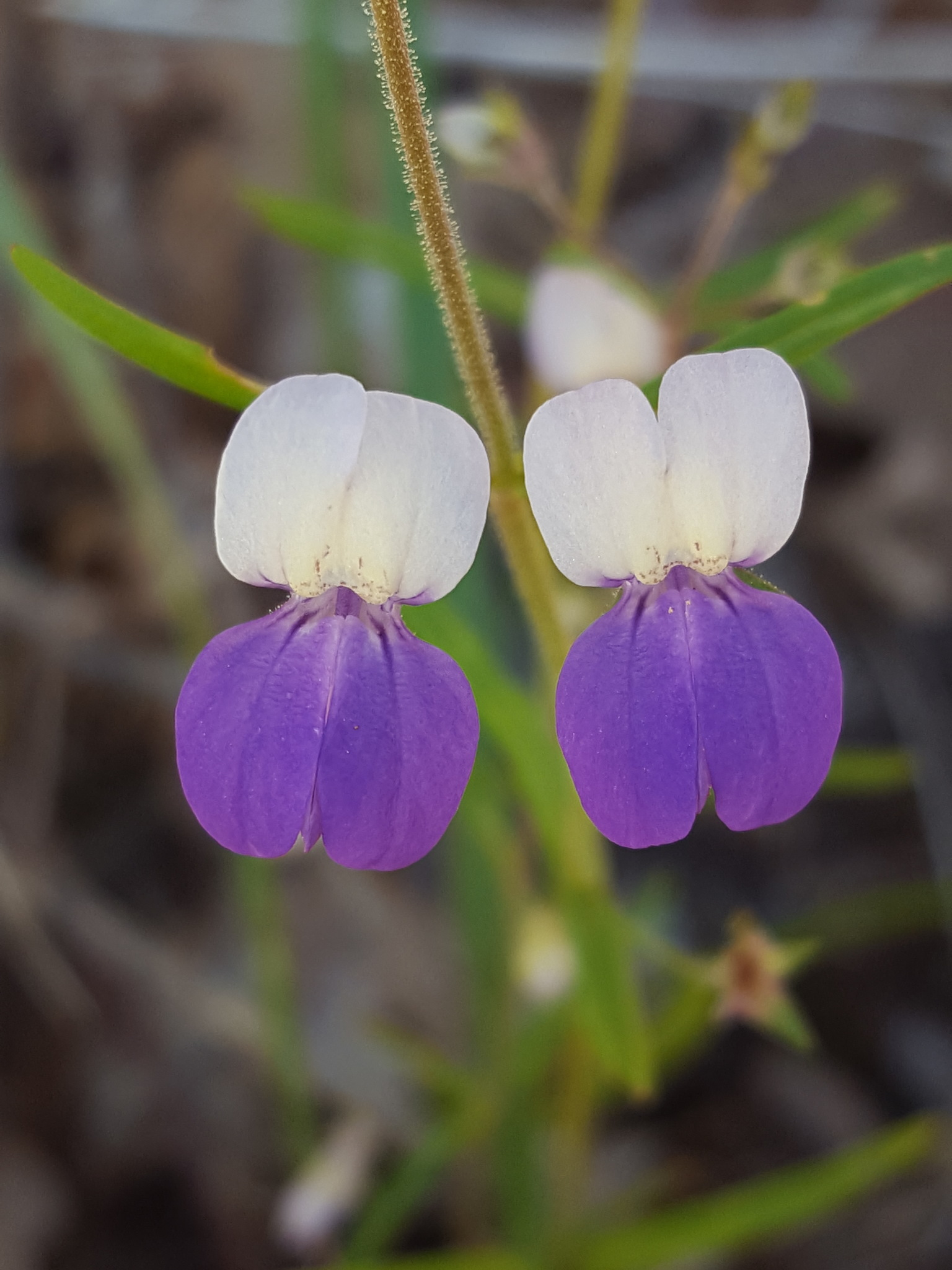

Scientific classification
- Kingdom: Plantae
- Clade: Tracheophytes
- Clade: Angiosperms
- Clade: Eudicots
- Clade: Asterids
- Order: Lamiales
- Family: Plantaginaceae
- Genus: Collinsia
- Species: C. linearis

Binomial name
- Collinsia linearis A.Gray

= Collinsia linearis =

Species of flowering plant

Collinsia linearis is a species of flowering plant in the plantain family known by the common name narrowleaf blue-eyed Mary.

It is native to the coniferous forests of the Klamath Mountains in northern California and southern Oregon sometimes on serpentine soils. It has also been seen in the Sierra Nevada.

== Description ==
Collinsia linearis is an annual herb growing up to 16 inches (41 centimetres) tall.

The inflorescence is a series of nodes, each bearing 1 to 5 flowers. Each flower arises on a pedicel coated in glandular hairs. The corolla of the flower angles sharply from the calyx of sepals. It is white to purple-tinted to deep purple-blue, and sometimes bicolored. There are two upper lobes and three lower lobes, the middle lower lobe forming a pouch. Its chromosome number is n=7.

Collinsia linearis grows in open coniferous forests at elevations ranging from 200–2,000 m (660–6,560 ft).
