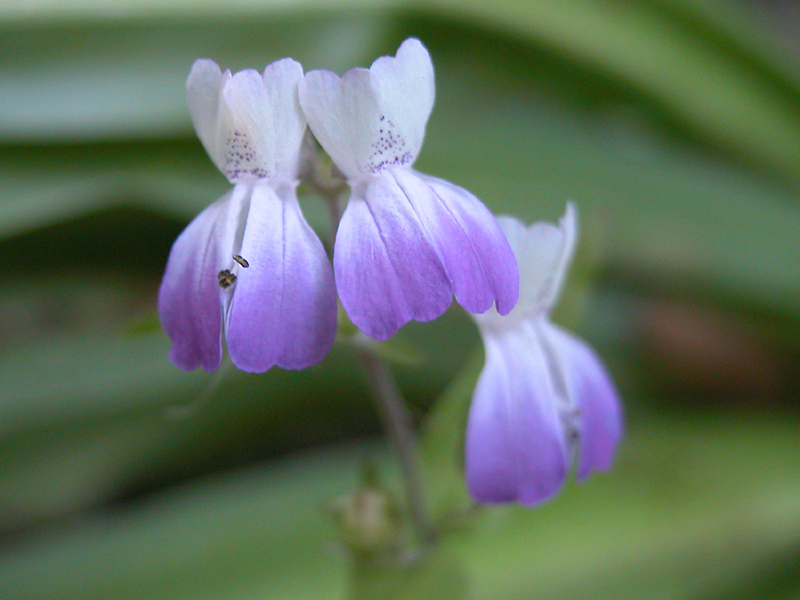

Conservation status
- Imperiled (NatureServe)

Scientific classification
- Kingdom: Plantae
- Clade: Tracheophytes
- Clade: Angiosperms
- Clade: Eudicots
- Clade: Asterids
- Order: Lamiales
- Family: Plantaginaceae
- Genus: Collinsia
- Species: C. multicolor

Binomial name
- Collinsia multicolor Lindl. & Paxton

Synonyms
- Collinsia franciscana

= Collinsia multicolor =

Species of flowering plant

Collinsia multicolor is a species of flowering plant in the plantain family, known by the common names San Francisco blue eyed Mary and San Francisco collinsia. It is endemic to the San Francisco Bay Area, where it is known from San Francisco to Santa Cruz. As of 2008 there are 22 known occurrences. Populations south of Santa Cruz have been extirpated.

The plant grows in coniferous forests and shady, moist habitats of the coastal chaparral scrub.

== Description ==
Collinsia multicolor is an annual herb producing a delicate, slender stem 30 to 60 centimeters tall. The upper parts of the stem are hairy and sticky with glands. The oppositely arranged leaves are triangular lance-shaped with serrated edges, each pair clasping the stem where they meet.

The inflorescence is a series of whorls or clusters of flowers, the lower series bearing one or two flowers and the upper bearing several in a whorl. Each flower arises on a pedicel. The corolla is between one and two centimeters long and has two white upper lobes sometimes dotted with purple and three lavender to purple lower lobes.

This plant was first described by the English architect Joseph Paxton in association with John Lindley.
