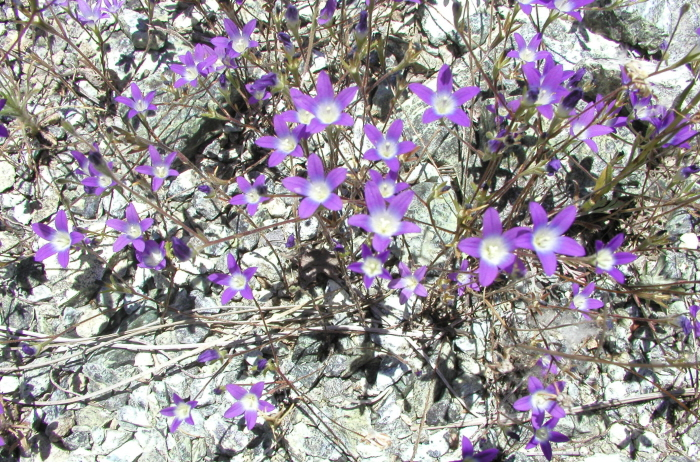
- subsp. pulchella

Scientific classification
- Kingdom: Plantae
- Clade: Tracheophytes
- Clade: Angiosperms
- Clade: Eudicots
- Clade: Asterids
- Order: Asterales
- Family: Campanulaceae
- Genus: Githopsis
- Species: G. pulchella

Binomial name
- Githopsis pulchella Vatke

= Githopsis pulchella =

Species of flowering plant

Githopsis pulchella is a species of flowering plant in the bellflower family known by the common names Sierra bluecup and largeflower bluecup. It is endemic to California, where it grows in the lower elevations of the Sierra Nevada and in the southern reaches of the Cascade Range.

This is an annual herb producing an erect stem to a maximum height anywhere between 4 and 40 centimeters. The hairy or hairless stem has occasional small lance-shaped leaves. The solitary flower appears at the top of the stem. It is one or two centimeters long, bell-shaped, and deep violet with a white throat. The small, erect style can be seen in the throat.
