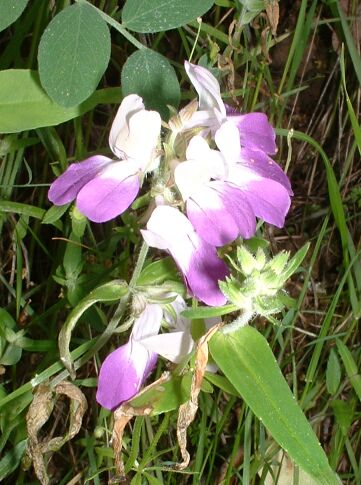
- Purple Chinese houses (Collinsia heterophylla)

Scientific classification
- Kingdom: Plantae
- Clade: Embryophytes
- Clade: Tracheophytes
- Clade: Spermatophytes
- Clade: Angiosperms
- Clade: Eudicots
- Clade: Asterids
- Order: Lamiales
- Family: Plantaginaceae
- Genus: Collinsia; Nutt.

Species
- About 20, see text

= Collinsia =

Genus of flowering plants

Collinsia is a genus of about 20 species of annual flowering plants, consisting of the blue eyed Marys and the Chinese houses. It was traditionally placed in the snapdragon family Scrophulariaceae, but following recent research in molecular genetics, it has now been placed in a much enlarged family Plantaginaceae.

The genus is endemic to North America, and is named in honor of Zacchaeus Collins, a Philadelphia botanist of the late eighteenth/early nineteenth century. Many of the 20 species may be found in California.

Two species, Collinsia parviflora (smallflower blue eyed Mary) and Collinsia violacea (violet blue eyed Mary), had medicinal uses among American Indian peoples.

Species include:

- Collinsia antonina
- Collinsia bartsiifolia
- Collinsia callosa
- Collinsia childii
- Collinsia concolor
- Collinsia corymbosa
- Collinsia grandiflora
- Collinsia greenei
- Collinsia heterophylla
- Collinsia linearis
- Collinsia multicolor
- Collinsia parryi
- Collinsia parviflora
- Collinsia parvula
- Collinsia rattanii
- Collinsia sparsiflora
- Collinsia tinctoria
- Collinsia torreyi
- Collinsia verna
- Collinsia violacea
