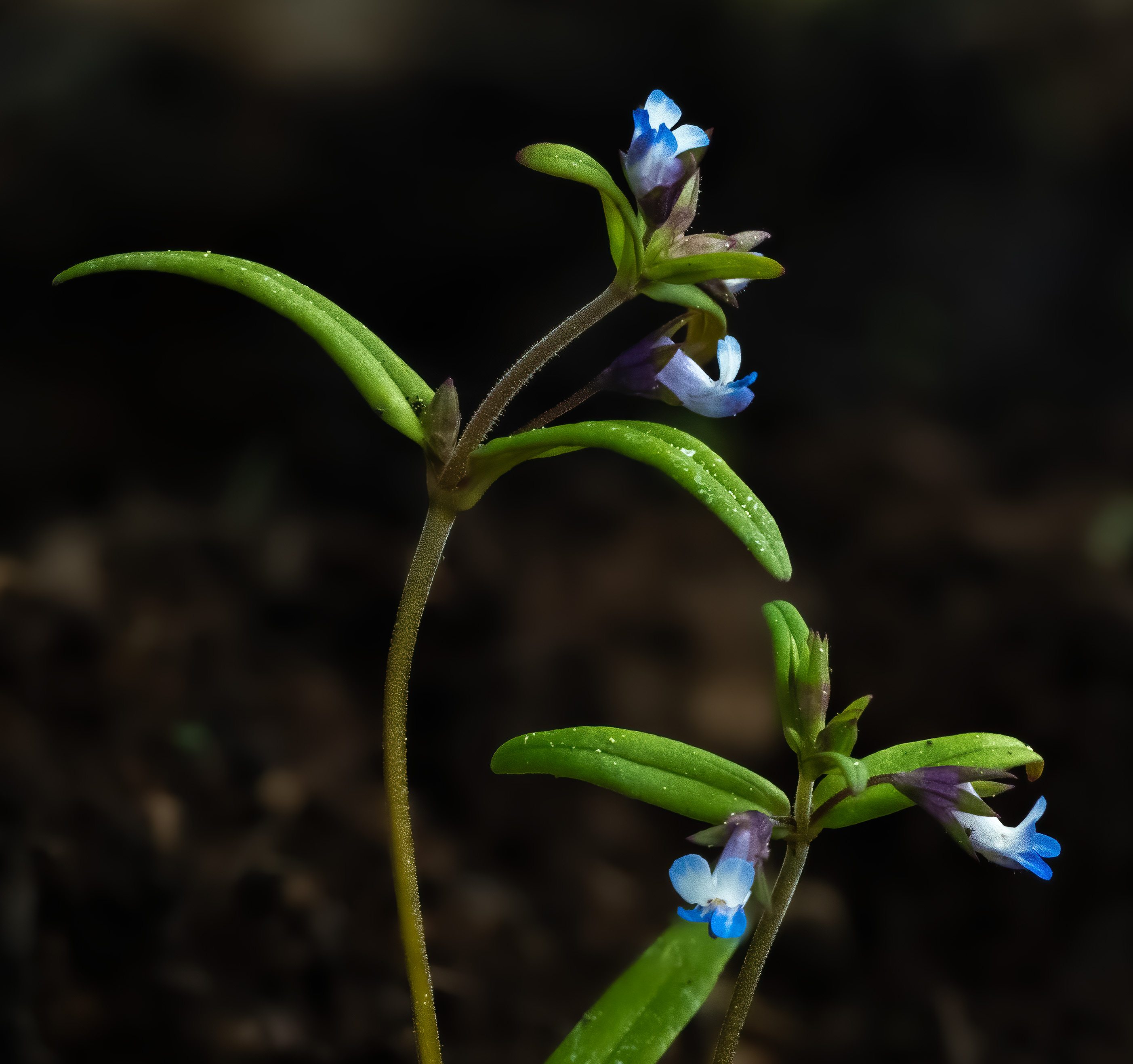

Conservation status
- Secure (NatureServe)

Scientific classification
- Kingdom: Plantae
- Clade: Tracheophytes
- Clade: Angiosperms
- Clade: Eudicots
- Clade: Asterids
- Order: Lamiales
- Family: Plantaginaceae
- Genus: Collinsia
- Species: C. parviflora

Binomial name
- Collinsia parviflora Douglas ex Lindl.

Synonyms
- Collinsia diehlii; Collinsia minima; Collinsia pauciflora

= Collinsia parviflora =

Plant species in the veronica family

Collinsia parviflora is a species of flowering plant in the family Plantaginaceae (previously Scrophulariaceae) known by the common names maiden blue eyed Mary and small-flowered collinsia.

This tiny wildflower is a common plant throughout much of western and northern North America, where it grows in moist, shady mountain forests.

== Description ==
Collinsia parviflora is an annual plant with a spindly reddish stem and narrow lance-shaped green leaves with edges that curl under.

The minuscule flowers grow singly or in loose clusters of several flowers. Each flower has five lobes, the lower deep blue to purple and the upper white. The whole corolla is only a few millimeters across.

The fruit is a small capsule.

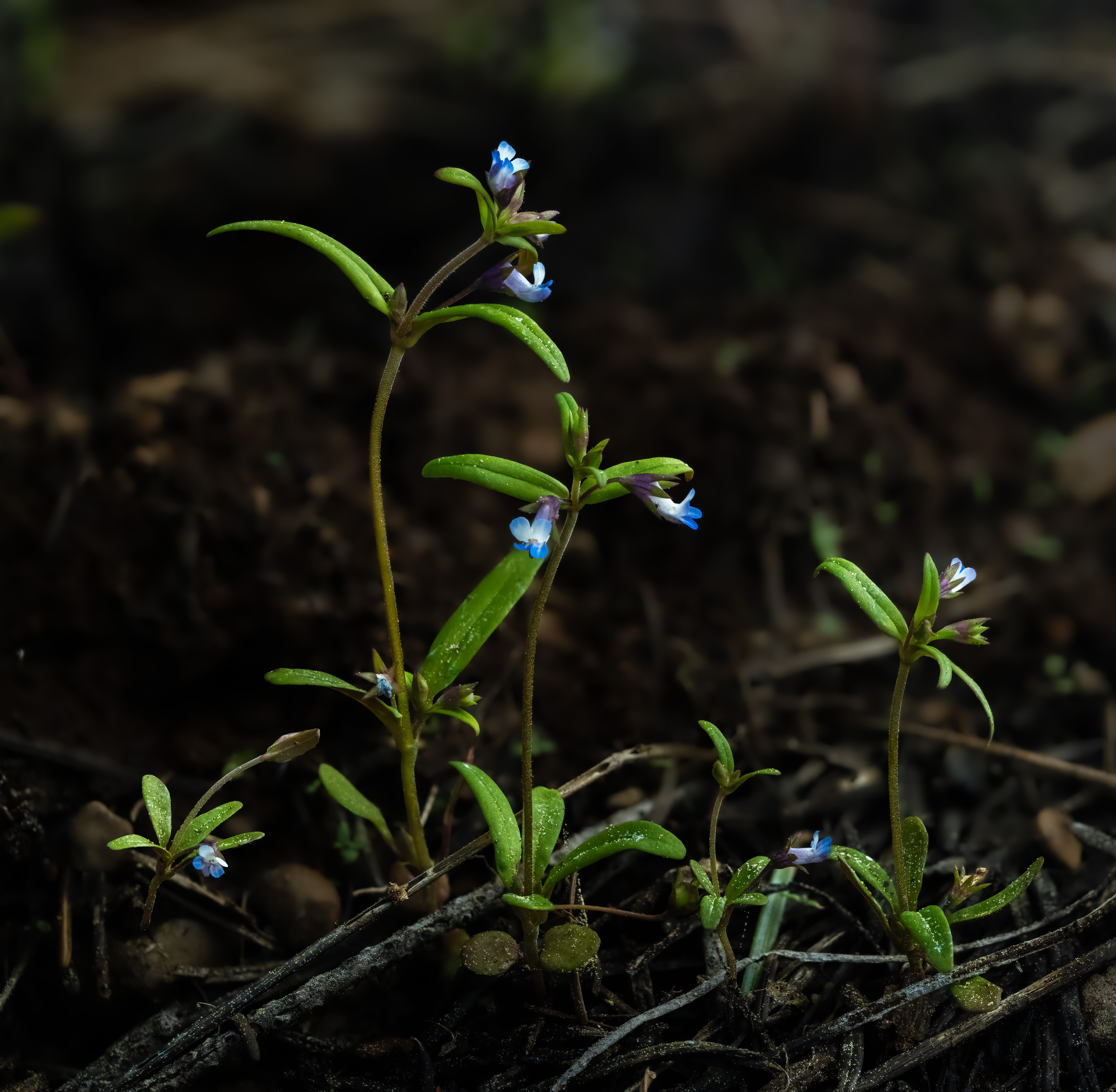
Collinsia parviflora near Mt. Shasta, California

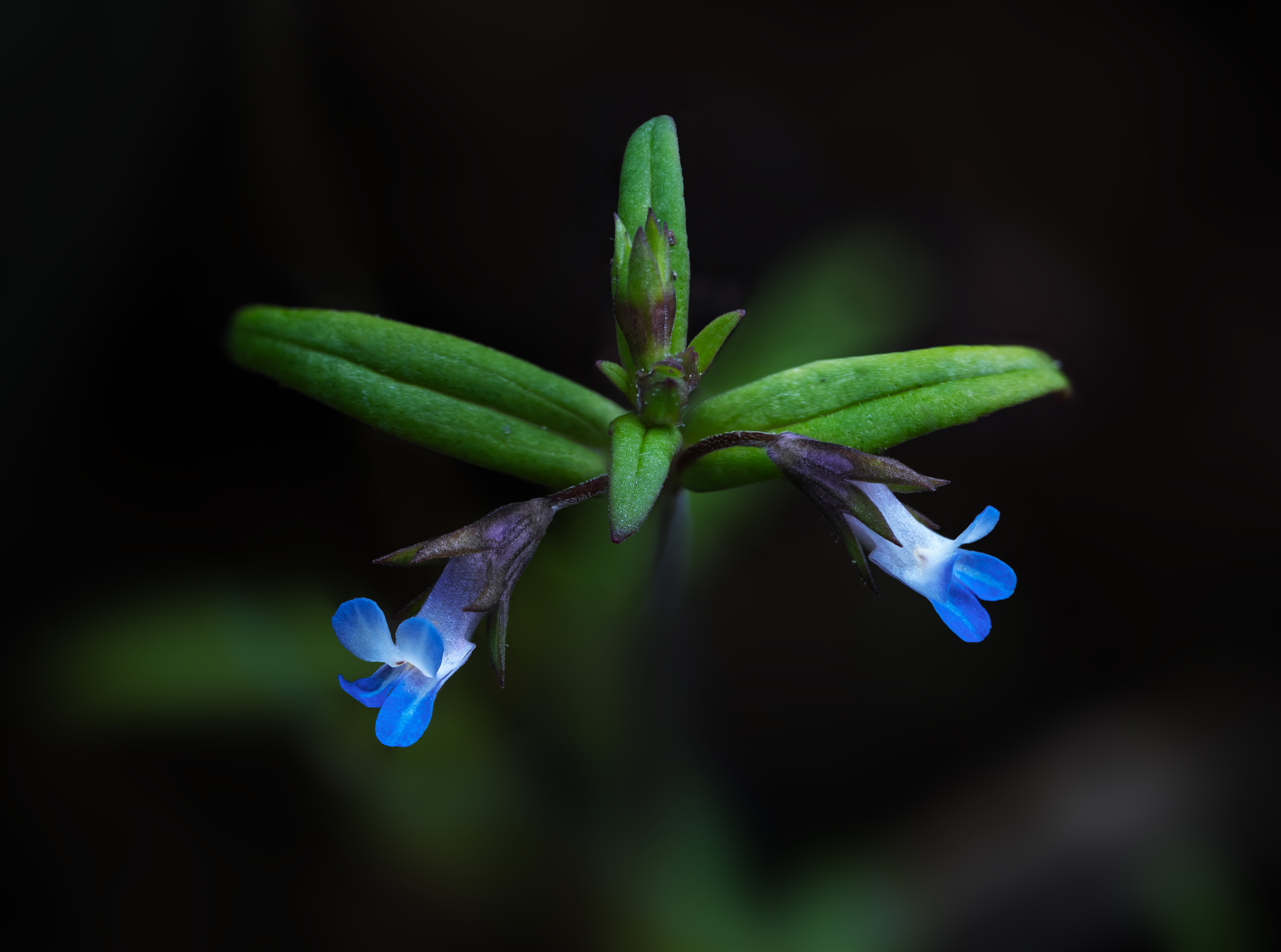
Collinsia parviflora near Mt. Shasta, California

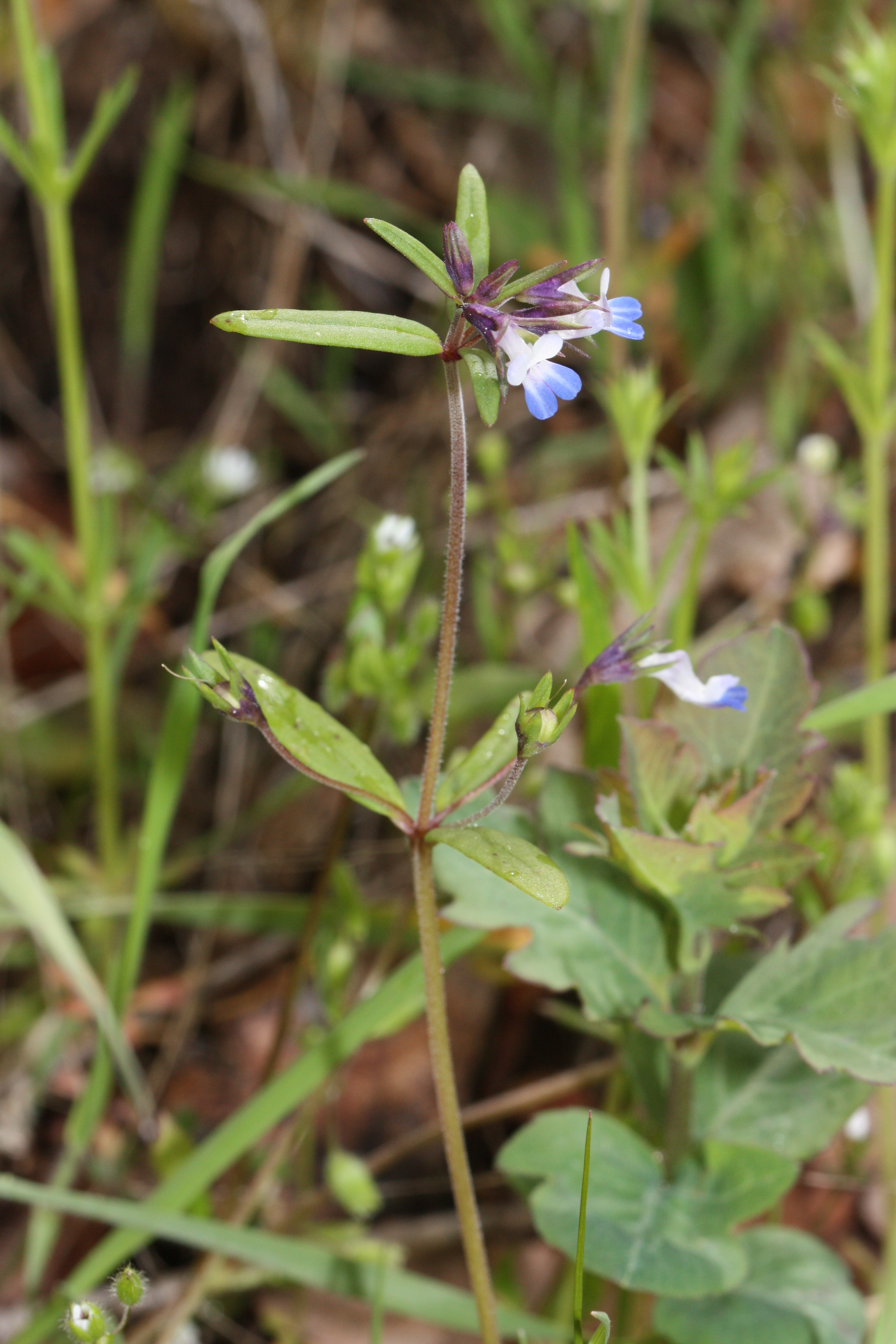
Collinsia parviflora near The Dalles, Oregon

== Taxonomy ==
Collinsia parviflora was scientifically described and named in 1827 by John Lindley, who credited the work of David Douglas. It is classified in the genus Collinsia, part of the family Plantaginaceae. Mutants of this species show magenta and white flowers, instead of the typical blue, which is caused by epistasis. The leaves may show purple spots, depending on another mutation. The species has no varieties, but has two variety names among its eight heterotypic synonyms.

Table of Synonyms
Name	Year	Rank	Notes
Collinsia diehlii M.E.Jones	1908	species	
Collinsia grandiflora var. pusilla A.Gray	1878	variety	
Collinsia minima Nutt.	1834	species	
Collinsia parviflora var. diehlii (M.E.Jones) Pennell	1951	variety	
Collinsia parviflora var. minima (Nutt.) M.E.Jones	1908	variety	
Collinsia parviflora f. rosea F.A.Warren	1928	form	
Collinsia parviflora var. simplex Farw.	1945	variety	
Collinsia pauciflora Hook.	1837	species	sphalm.
