= Collinsia corymbosa =

Conservation status
- Critically Imperiled (NatureServe)

Scientific classification
- Kingdom: Plantae
- Clade: Tracheophytes
- Clade: Angiosperms
- Clade: Eudicots
- Clade: Asterids
- Order: Lamiales
- Family: Plantaginaceae
- Genus: Collinsia
- Species: C. corymbosa

Binomial name
- Collinsia corymbosa Herder

Species of flowering plant

Collinsia corymbosa is a species of flowering plant in the plantain family known by the common name round-headed Chinese houses. It is endemic to the coastline of California north of the San Francisco Bay Area, where it is uncommon and scattered. Its habitat is the sand dunes of the immediate coastline. This is an annual herb producing a scaly, hairy, red to reddish green stem which grows upright or decumbent to a maximum length of about 25 centimeters. The thick, sparsely hairy leaves are rippled and lobed along the edges, which may be somewhat turned under. The inflorescence is a dense whorl of several distinctive flowers. Each has a hairy calyx of lobed reddish sepals and a corolla up to about 2 centimeters long. The flower has two small upper lobes and three longer lower lobes which come together in a nearly tubular shape. It is generally white with a light purple tint. The smaller upper lobes curl back and dry to brown at their lips.
