= Collinsia greenei =

Scientific classification
- Kingdom: Plantae
- Clade: Tracheophytes
- Clade: Angiosperms
- Clade: Eudicots
- Clade: Asterids
- Order: Lamiales
- Family: Plantaginaceae
- Genus: Collinsia
- Species: C. greenei

Binomial name
- Collinsia greenei A.Gray

Species of flowering plant

Collinsia greenei is a species of flowering plant in the plantain family known by the common name Greene's blue-eyed Mary.

It is endemic to northern California, where it grows in the coastal and inland mountains, including the North Coast Ranges and the Klamath Mountains. Its habitat includes chaparral and coniferous forest on serpentine soils.

== Description ==
Collinsia greenei is an annual herb producing a very glandular-hairy purple-tinted green stem up to about 30 centimeters tall. The oppositely arranged leaves may be toothed or smooth on the edges.

The inflorescence is an interrupted series of whorls bearing one to five flowers each. Each flower arises on an erect pedicel. The sepals are bluntly lobed and coated thickly in glandular hairs. The flower is one to 1.5 centimeters long and royal purple in color, sometimes with a wash of white in the throat. It has two short upper lobes with their lips turned back, and three longer lower lobes arranged into a long pouch.
