= Collinsia rattanii =

Scientific classification
- Kingdom: Plantae
- Clade: Tracheophytes
- Clade: Angiosperms
- Clade: Eudicots
- Clade: Asterids
- Order: Lamiales
- Family: Plantaginaceae
- Genus: Collinsia
- Species: C. rattanii

Binomial name
- Collinsia rattanii A.Gray

Species of flowering plant

Collinsia rattanii is a species of flowering plant in the plantain family known by the common name sticky blue-eyed Mary. It is native to the coniferous forests of the Pacific Northwest of the United States from Washington to northern California. It is an annual herb growing up to 40 centimeters tall with linear leaves rolled under along the edges. The leaves are hairy on the upper surface and hairless and purple-tinted underneath. The inflorescence is coated in sticky glandular hairs. It has a series of nodes from which arise one to five flowers each on pedicels. The flower is only 4 to 8 millimeters long, with two mostly white upper lobes and three mostly purple lower lobes.
