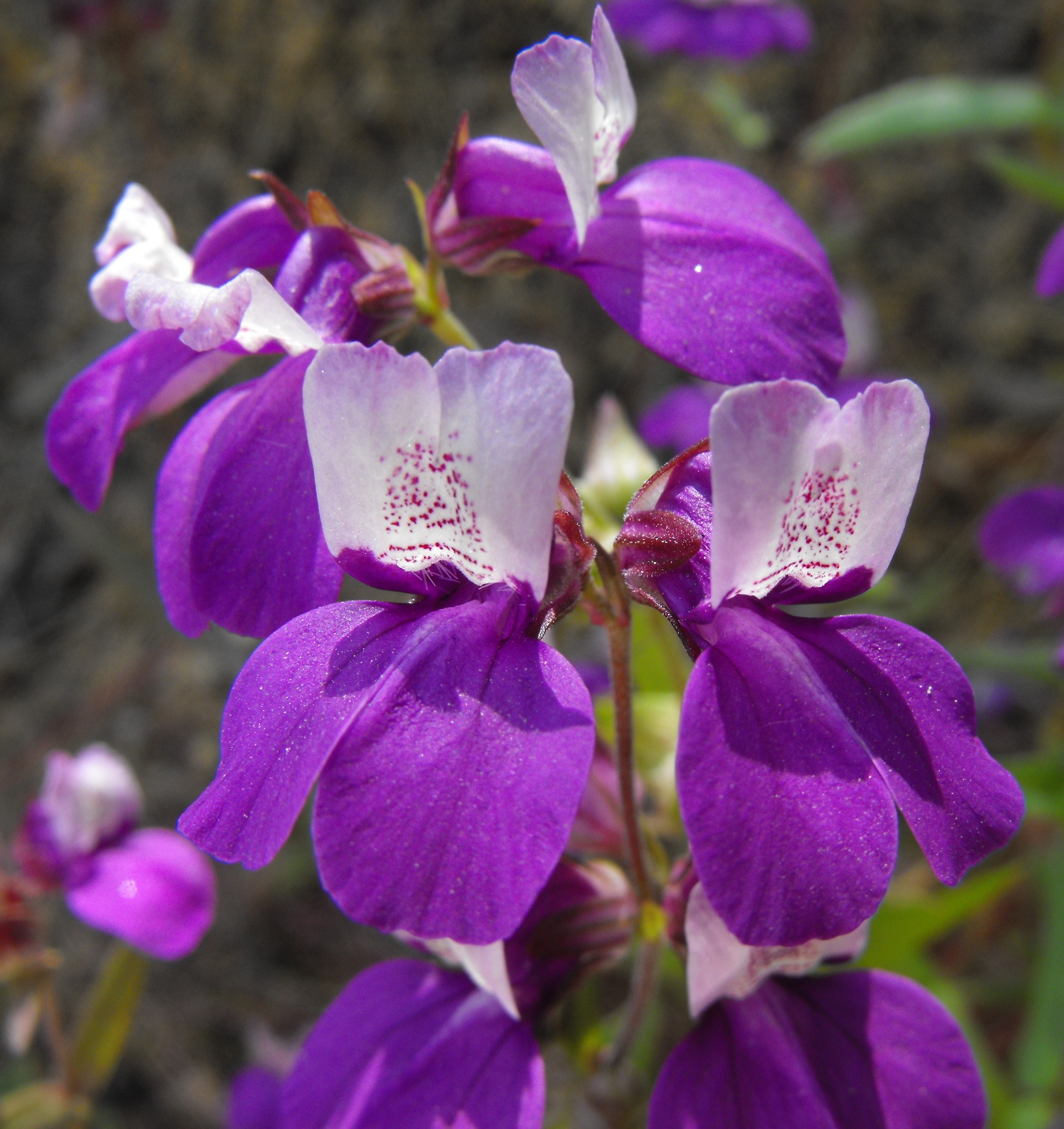

Scientific classification
- Kingdom: Plantae
- Clade: Embryophytes
- Clade: Tracheophytes
- Clade: Angiosperms
- Clade: Eudicots
- Clade: Asterids
- Order: Lamiales
- Family: Plantaginaceae
- Genus: Collinsia
- Species: C. heterophylla

Binomial name
- Collinsia heterophylla Buist ex Graham

Synonyms
- Collinsia bicolor Benth.

= Collinsia heterophylla =

Species of flowering plant

Collinsia heterophylla, known as purple Chinese houses or innocence, is a flowering plant native to California and the Peninsular Ranges in northern Baja California.

== Description ==
Collinsia heterophylla is an annual plant growing in shady places, 10–50 centimetres (4–20 in) in height. It can be found in most of California (other than desert regions) below about 1,000 metres (3,300 ft).

It blooms from mid spring to early summer. Like other species in the genus Collinsia, which also includes the blue-eyed Marys, it gets its name from its towers of inflorescences of decreasing diameter, which give the plants in full flower a certain resemblance to a pagoda.

Dried in air, the seeds weigh about 1 mg each.

=== Varieties ===
- Collinsia heterophylla var. austromontana
- Collinsia heterophylla var. heterophylla

== Taxonomy ==
The species was first described as Collinsia bicolor by George Bentham in 1835, but this name proved to be a later homonym of Collinsia bicolor Raf. (described in 1824), necessitating the name change to C. heterophylla. Despite this, the name C. bicolor is still sometimes used in references.

== Gallery ==
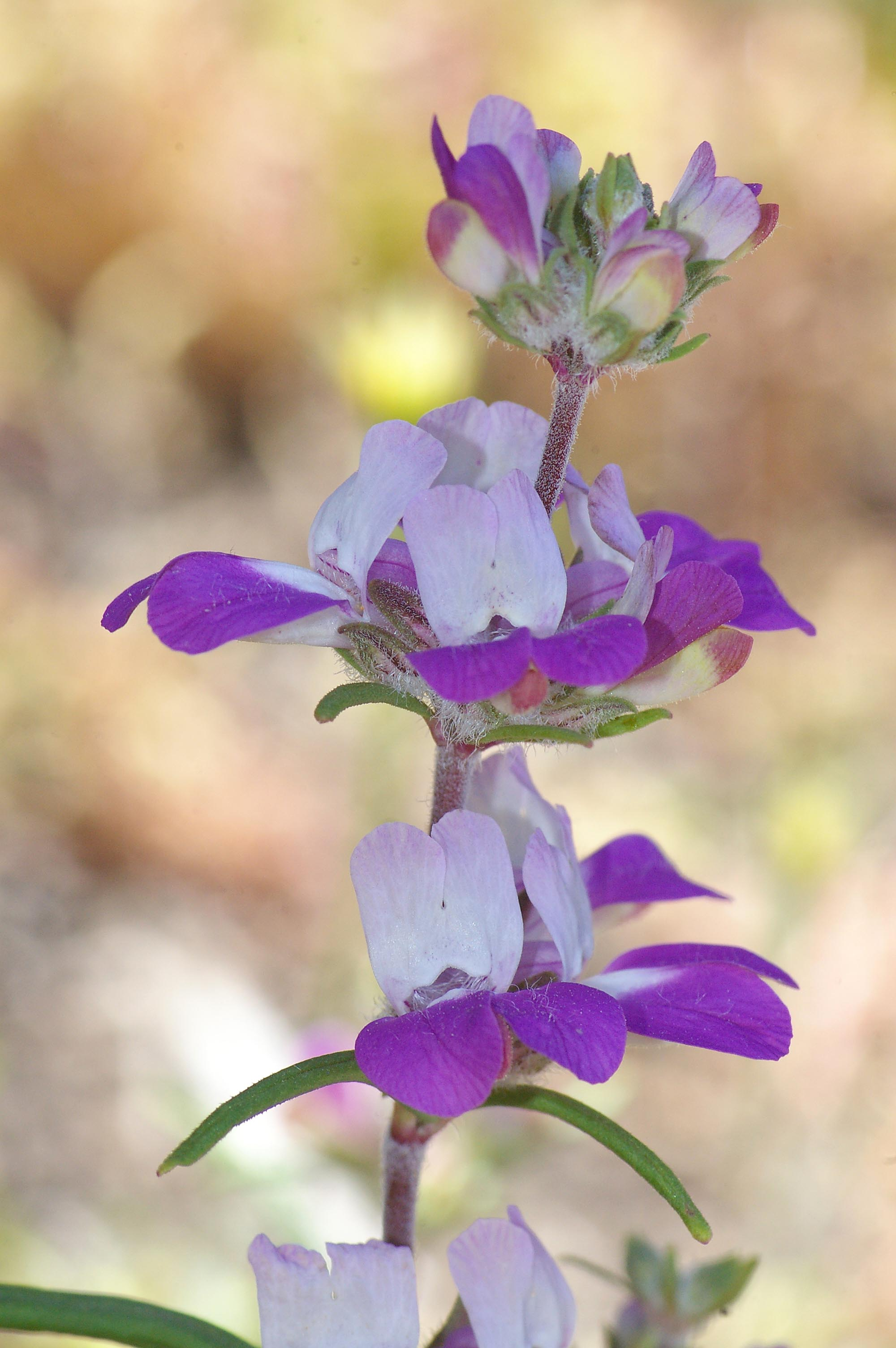
Collinsia heterophylla is also known by the common name Chinese Houses.

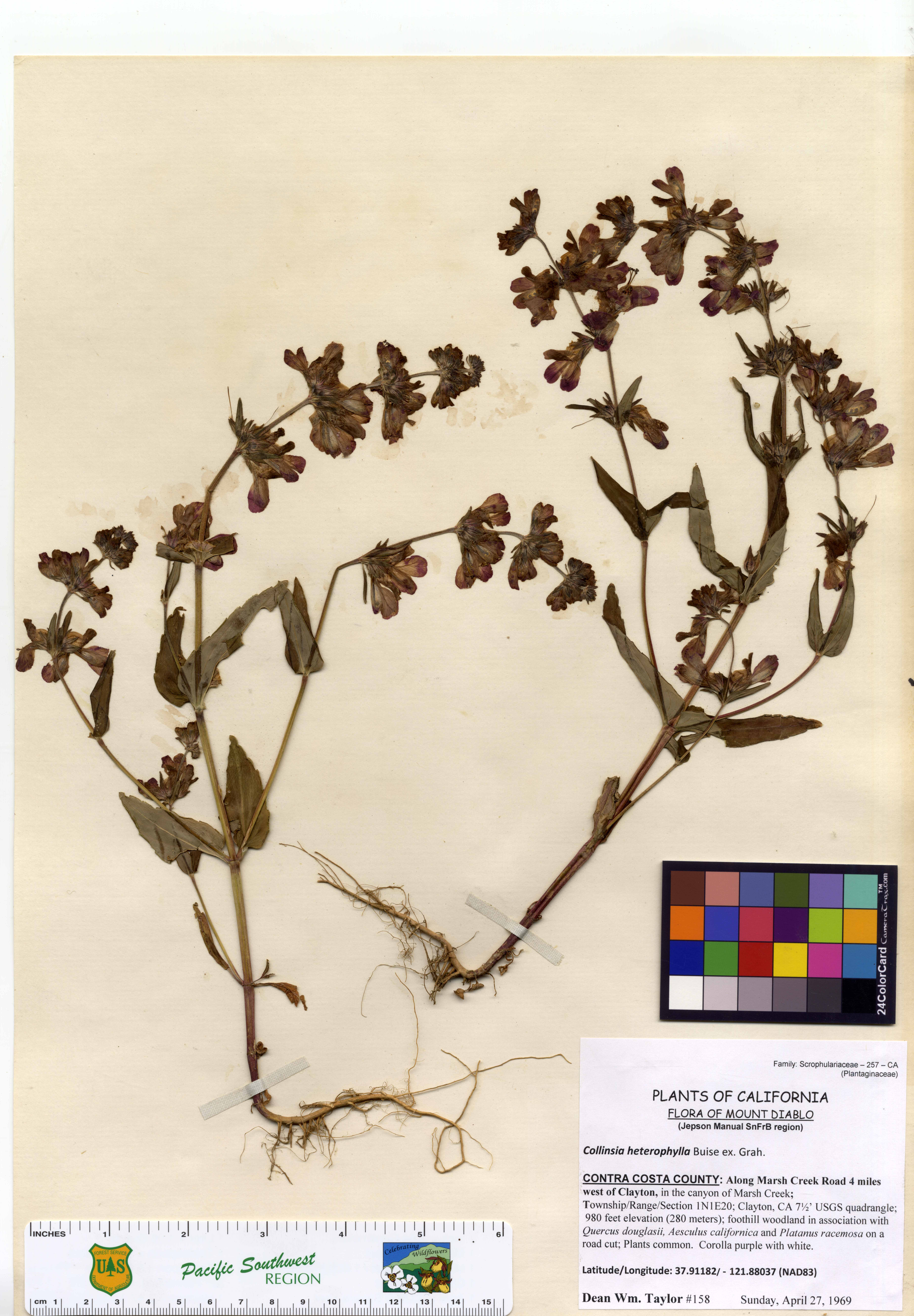
Pressed and dried Collinsia heterophylla in an herbarium.

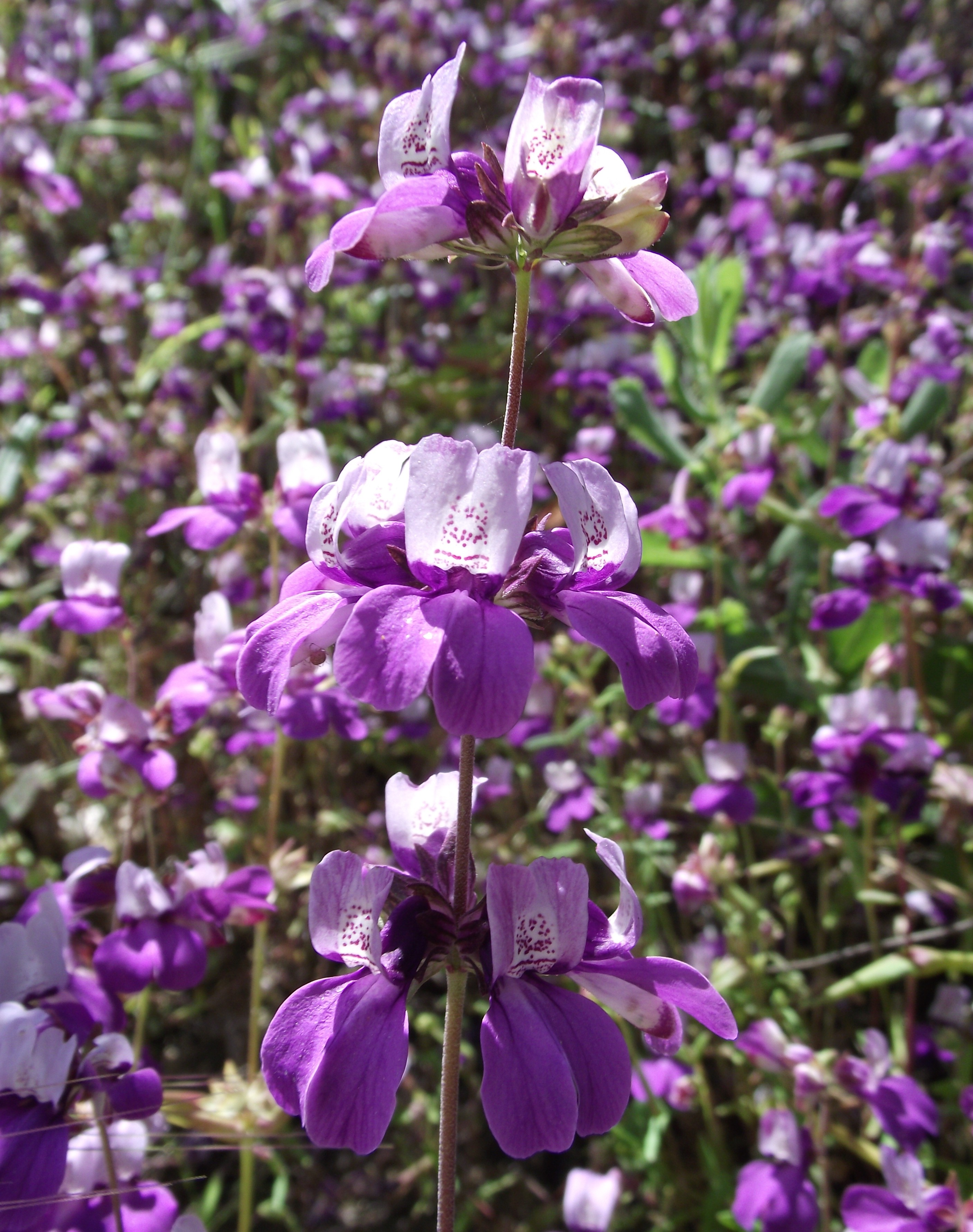
Collinsia heterophylla blossoms on a stalk.
