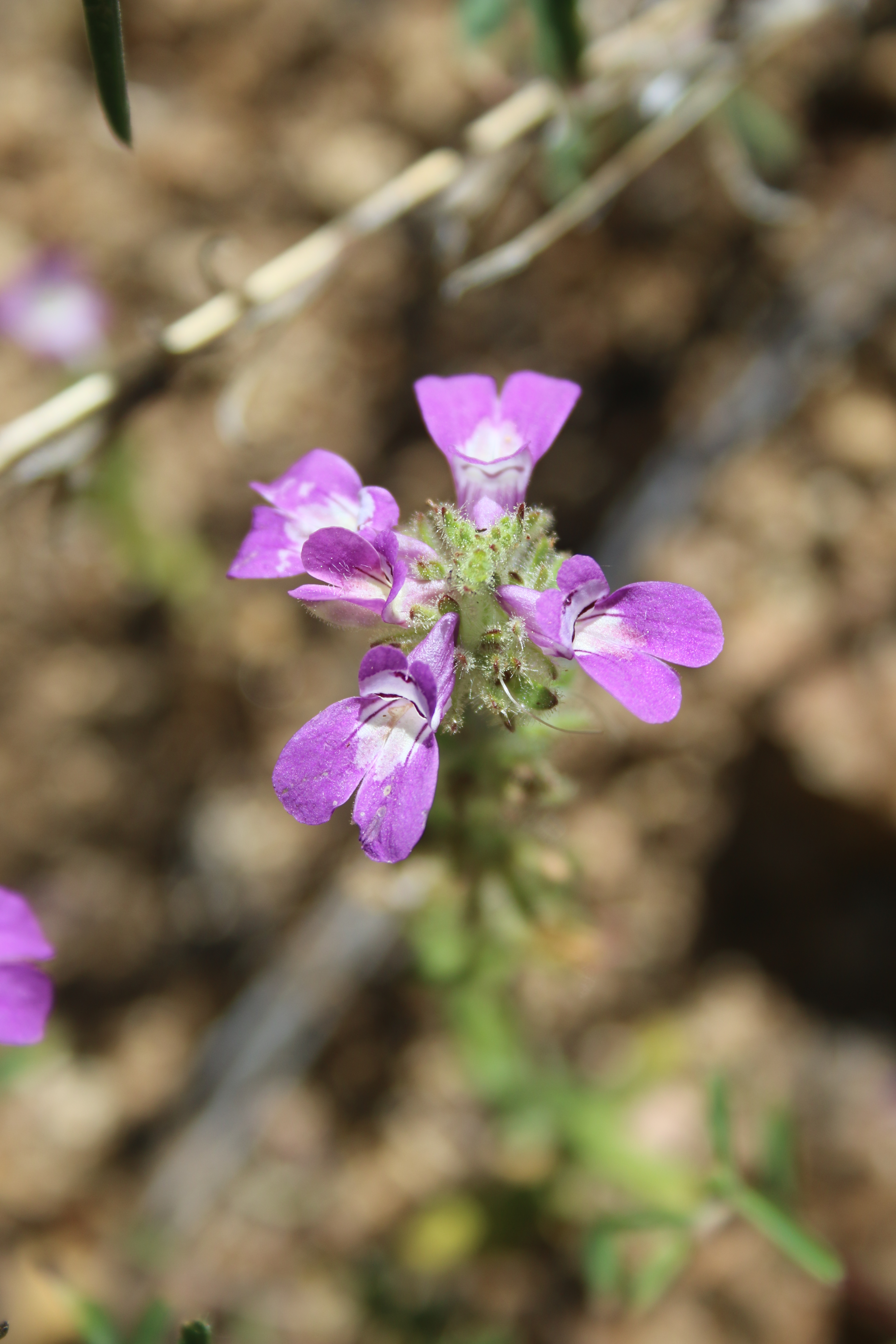

Scientific classification
- Kingdom: Plantae
- Clade: Tracheophytes
- Clade: Angiosperms
- Clade: Eudicots
- Clade: Asterids
- Order: Lamiales
- Family: Plantaginaceae
- Genus: Collinsia
- Species: C. tinctoria

Binomial name
- Collinsia tinctoria Hartw. ex Benth.

= Collinsia tinctoria =

Species of flowering plant

Collinsia tinctoria is a species of flowering plant in the family Plantaginaceae known by the common names sticky Chinese houses and tincture plant.

It is endemic to California, where it grows in the woodlands and forests of the mountain ranges of the central and northern regions of the state.

== Description ==
Collinsia tinctoria is an annual herb producing a sturdy erect stem up to about 60 centimeters tall.

The oppositely arranged leaves are triangular lance-shaped, sometimes toothed, and hairy on the undersides.

The inflorescence is a series of widely spaced dense whorls of flowers, each whorl a crowded ring of flowers held on erect pedicels. The flower has five elongated sepals with rounded tips, the corolla angling sharply down from the mouth of the calyx. The corolla may be any of several colors from white to yellow to deep lavender and may be mottled or speckled and tinted in the throat. The inflorescence and some flower parts are glandular and hairy.
