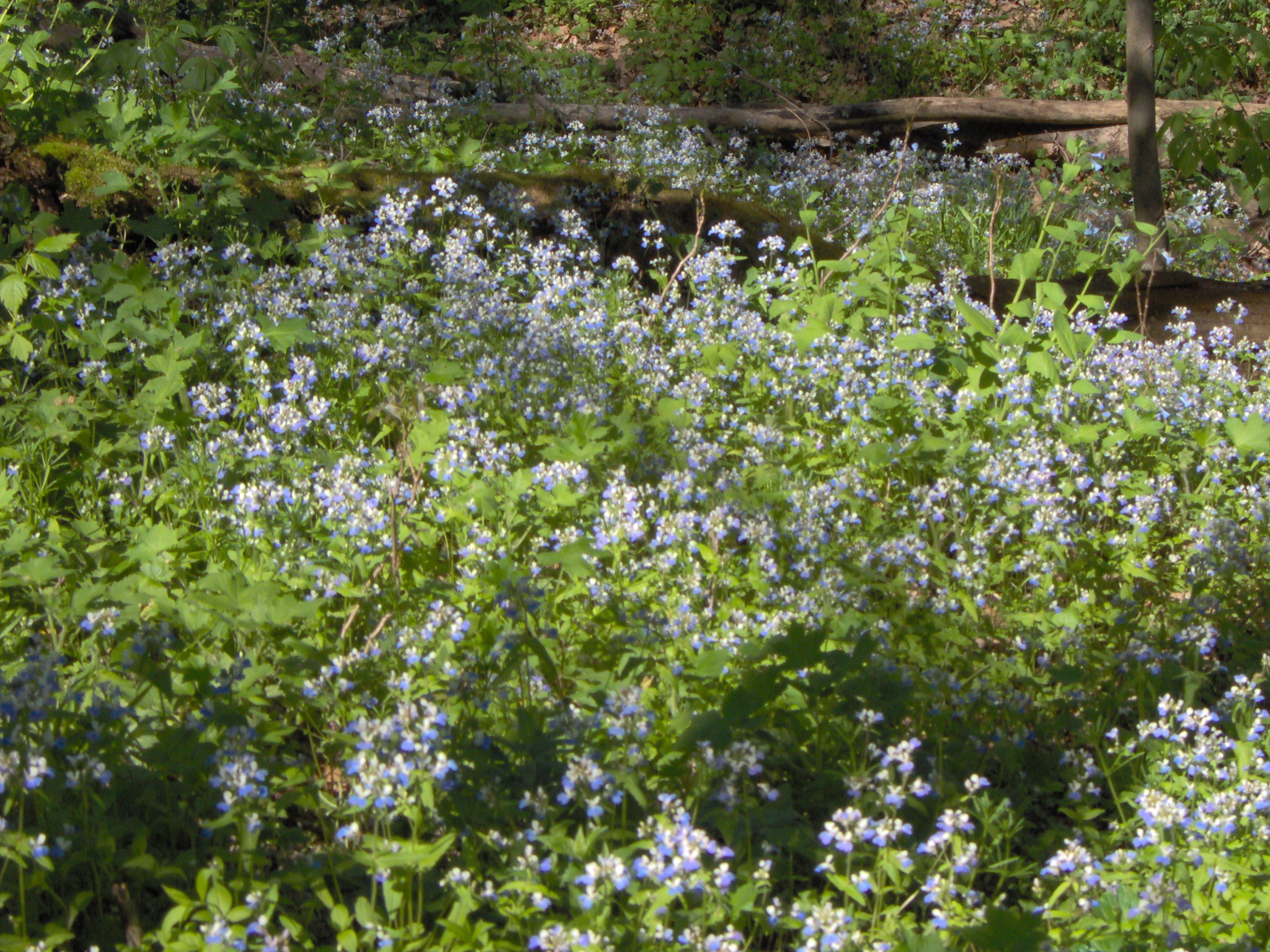

Conservation status
- Secure (NatureServe)

Scientific classification
- Kingdom: Plantae
- Clade: Tracheophytes
- Clade: Angiosperms
- Clade: Eudicots
- Clade: Asterids
- Order: Lamiales
- Family: Plantaginaceae
- Genus: Collinsia
- Species: C. verna

Binomial name
- Collinsia verna Nutt. 1817

Synonyms
- Collinsia alba Raf.; Collinsia bicolor Raf.; Collinsia tricolor Raf.; Herpestis bicolor Mill. & Muhl.; Linaria tenella F.Dietr.

= Collinsia verna =

Species of flowering plant

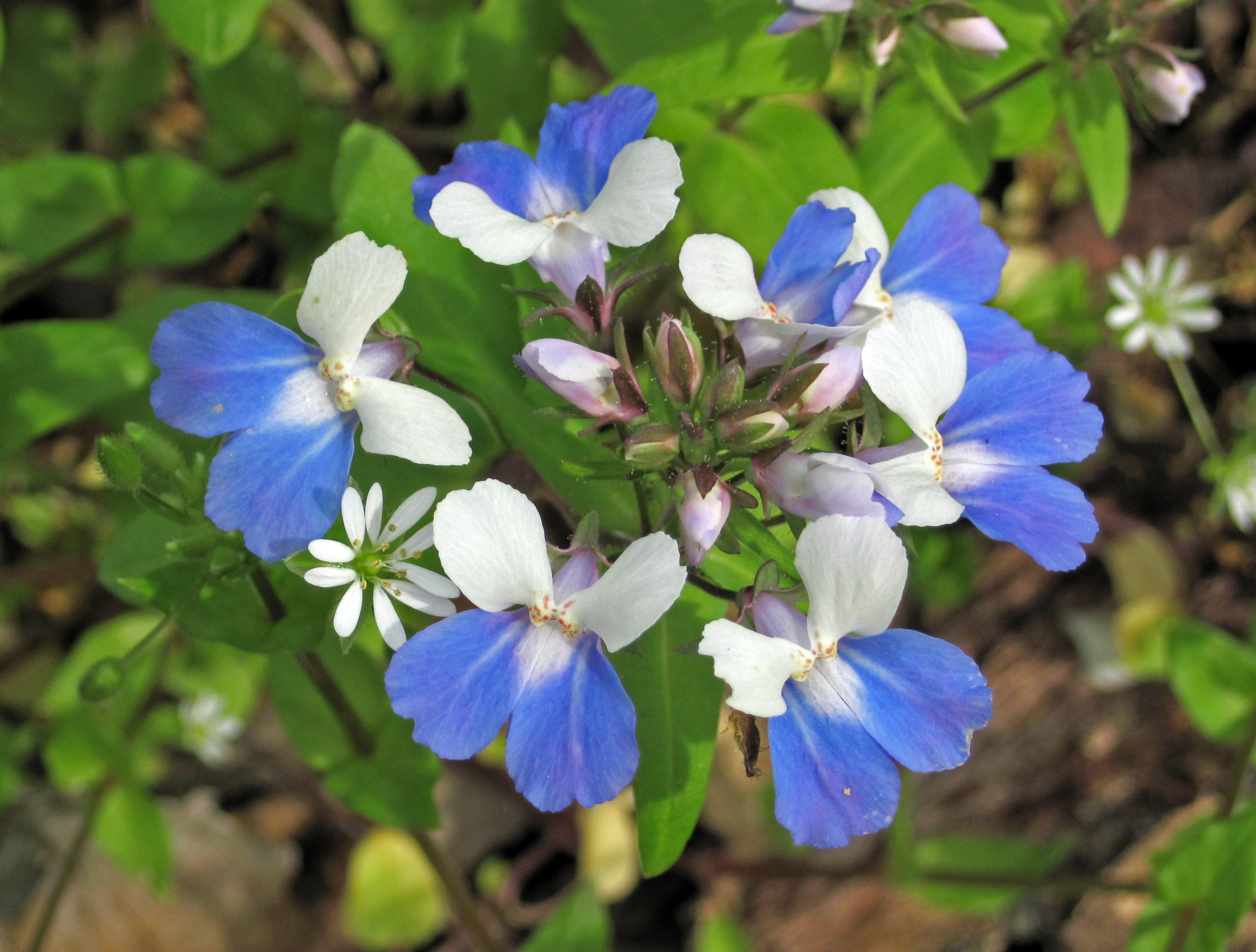
Collinsia verna (blue-eyed mary), Muskingum County, Ohio

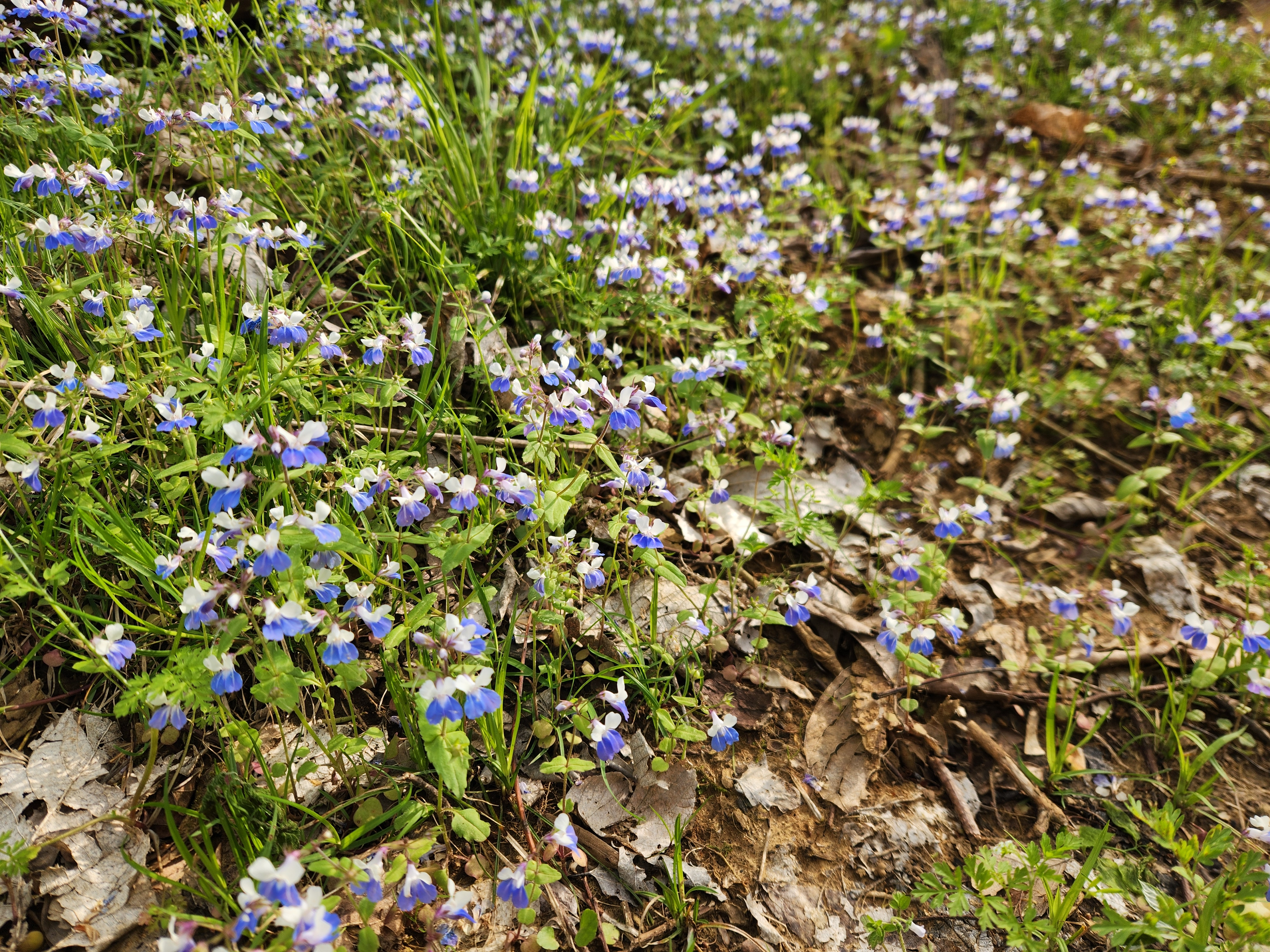
Collinsia verna (blue-eyed mary)

Collinsia verna, or blue-eyed Mary, is a winter annual that is native to the eastern and central parts of North America but has become endangered in the states of New York and Tennessee. The flowers are bicolored white and blue. It is a plant of valley bottoms and moist bottom slopes, in areas with moderate lighting and requires some shade.

== Distribution ==
Collinsia verna is native to Ontario, New York, south to Virginia, southwest to Tennessee and Oklahoma, and north to Kansas, Iowa, and Wisconsin. It is also present in a multitude of other places filling the eastern states of the U.S.

== Habitat and ecology ==
Collinsia verna is often found in areas of damp open wood as it requires ample amounts of shade. Moist to mesic environmental conditions with rich loamy soil are preferred as the growth and size of individual plants is strongly influenced by the moisture conditions and the richness of the soil. The seeds need to be planted during the summer so that they will germinate during the fall. Collinsia verna can also flourish in habitats including wooded lower slopes of river valleys, and along woodland paths. Sometimes Blue-Eyed Mary grow in drier deciduous woodlands, however in these cases, the individual plants are reported to be smaller in size.

== Morphology ==
Individual specimens can usually be found to be about 4-12 inches (10–30 cm) tall. Leaves opposite of each other can be up to 2" long and ¾" across; either medium green or yellowish green, and either glabrous or pubescent (usually the latter). The middle leaves are the largest, they range from being oval to broadly lanceolate, usually with a few blunt edges along their margins, and their bases are either sessile or clasp the stem. Sometimes individual flowers develop from the axils of the upper leaves; these axillary flowers have slender pedicels up to 1½" long. Each flower is ½-¾" across, consisting of a green calyx with 5 teeth and a blue/white corolla; the calyx is light green to purplish green. The corolla is divided into upper lip regions and lower lip regions. The upper lip is split into 2 large rounded lobes that are white, while the lower lip is slip into 3 lobes. The 2 large outer lobes of the lower lip are light blue to blue-violet, while the tiny middle lobe of the lower lip is folded into a keel and hidden from view. Its root system consists of a slender taproot. Collinsia verna is considered to be an herb.

== Reproduction ==
Collinsia verna reproduces via self pollination and through the late time of receptivity and change in position of its stigma and anther, resulting in delayed selfing. "In most flowers (70%), the stigma has moved to the front of the keel and is positioned near the anthers when the third anther dehisces. Under field conditions, fruiting success of plants within pollinator exclosures was; 75% of the fruiting success in open-pollinated plants (33% fruiting success via autogamy vs. 44% fruiting success, respectively)." (Susan Kalisz, 1999) It was concluded that autogamy indeed did occur late in floral development which raises its potential for reproductive assurance, and that individual flowers varied in their ability to set fruit through this mechanism.
