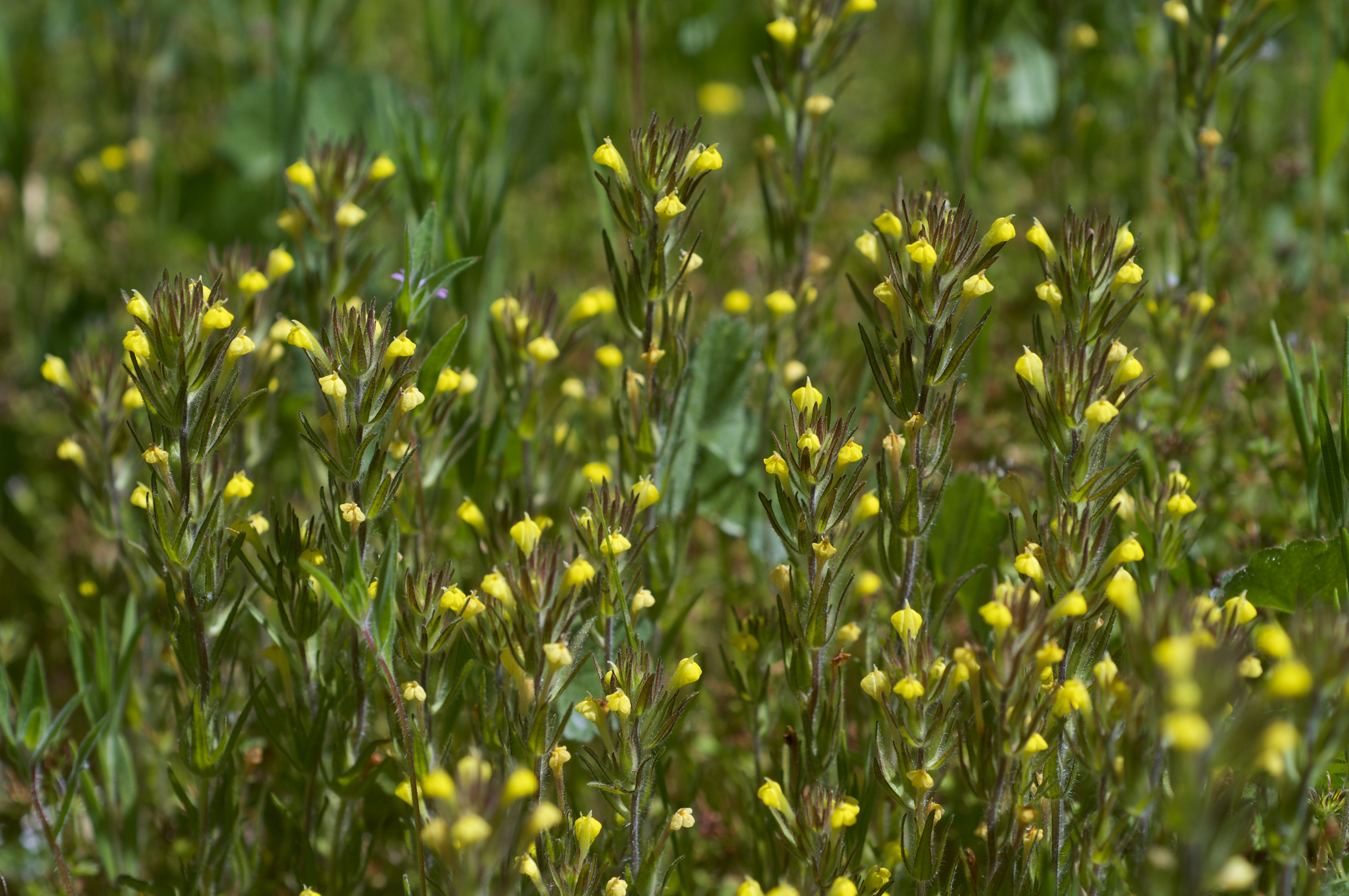

Scientific classification
- Kingdom: Plantae
- Clade: Tracheophytes
- Clade: Angiosperms
- Clade: Eudicots
- Clade: Asterids
- Order: Lamiales
- Family: Orobanchaceae
- Genus: Castilleja
- Species: C. tenuis

Binomial name
- Castilleja tenuis (A.Heller) T.I.Chuang & Heckard

= Castilleja tenuis =

Species of flowering plant

Castilleja tenuis is a species of Indian paintbrush, known by the common name hairy Indian paintbrush.

It is native to the Northwestern United States, California, Nevada, and British Columbia. It grows from 1,000–2,800 metres (3,300–9,200 ft) in a number of habitat types including meadows, especially in mountainous areas including the Sierra Nevada and Cascade Range.

== Description ==
Castilleja tenuis is an annual herb growing up to about 45 centimeters tall, green to purplish in color and coated in hairs.

The inflorescence is made up of many narrow bracts between which emerge the white to bright yellow pouched flowers.
