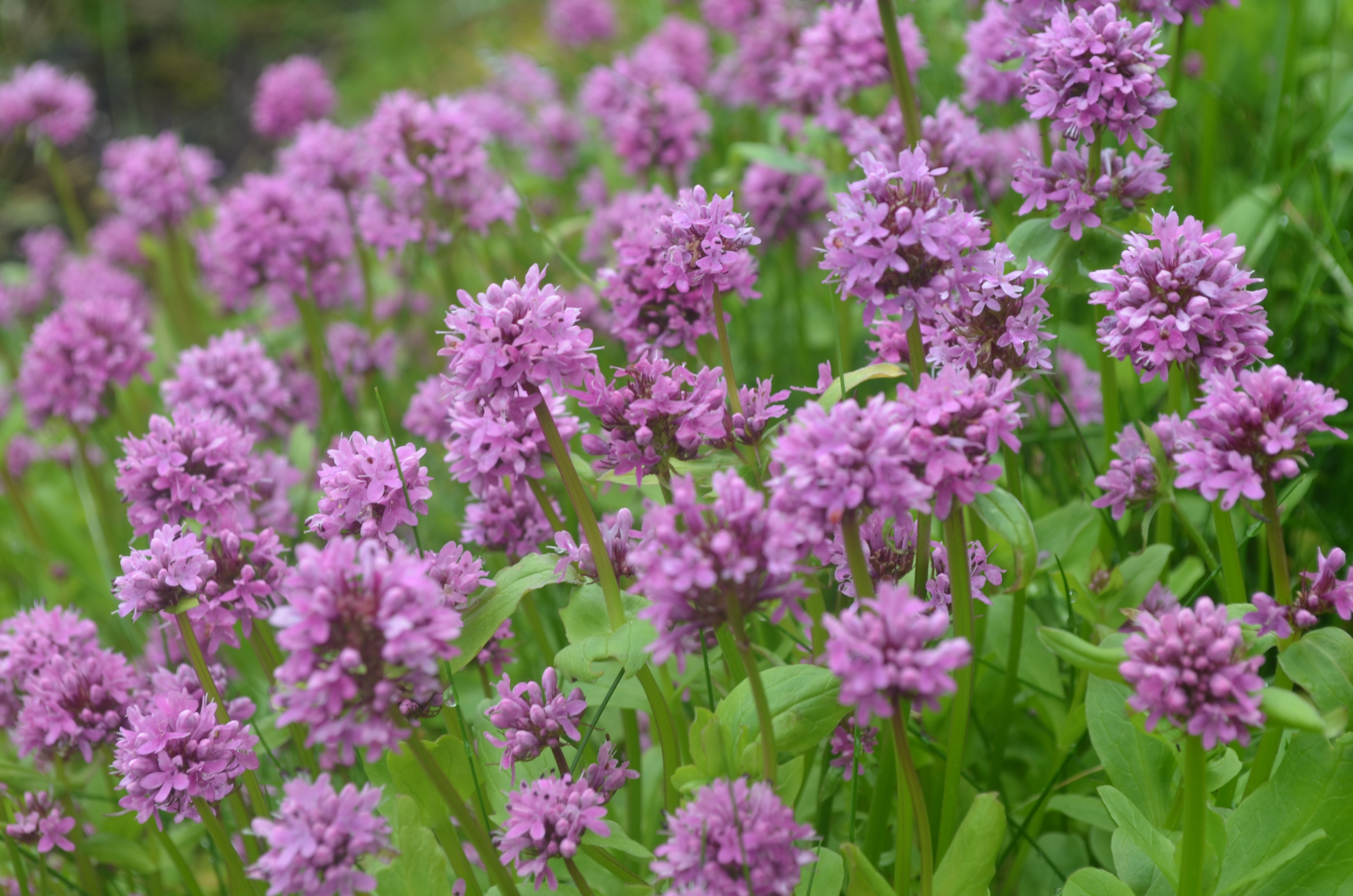

Scientific classification
- Kingdom: Plantae
- Clade: Tracheophytes
- Clade: Angiosperms
- Clade: Eudicots
- Clade: Asterids
- Order: Dipsacales
- Family: Caprifoliaceae
- Genus: Valeriana
- Species: V. congesta

Binomial name
- Valeriana congesta (Lindl.) Byng & Christenh. (2018)

Synonyms
- List: Plectritis congesta (Lindl.) DC. (1830); Plectritis microptera Suksd. (1897); Plectritis racemulosa Gand. (1918); Plectritis suksdorfii Gand. (1918); Valerianella congesta Lindl. (1827); Valerianella parviflora Douglas ex Torr. & A.Gray (1841)

= Valeriana congesta =

Species of flowering plant in the honeysuckle family

Valeriana congesta, synonym Plectritis congesta, is a species of flowering plant in the honeysuckle family. It is known by several common names, including shortspur seablush and rosy plectritis. It is native to western North America.

== Taxonomy ==
The species was first described by John Lindley in 1827 as Valerianella congesta. It was transferred to the genus Plectritis in 1830, and to Valeriana in 2018 when evidence suggested that Plectritis is a clade within Valeriana. As of October 2022, some sources maintain it in Plectritis.

== Distribution and habitat ==
Valeriana congesta is native to western North America from British Columbia (including Vancouver Island) through Washington and Oregon to southern California, where it is a common plant in coastal forests, seashores, mountain meadows, and other habitats.

== Description ==
Valeriana congesta is an annual herb growing erect 10 to 60 cm (4 to 24 in) tall. The widely spaced, paired and oppositely arranged leaves are oval or somewhat oblong, smooth-edged, and up to 6 cm (2.4 in) long by 2 cm (0.8 in) wide. The upper ones lack petioles. The inflorescence is a dense headlike cluster of flowers in shades of bright pink to nearly white. Each flower has an upper and lower lobed lip under 1 cm (0.4 in) long and three protruding stamens tipped with purple anthers bearing yellow pollen.
