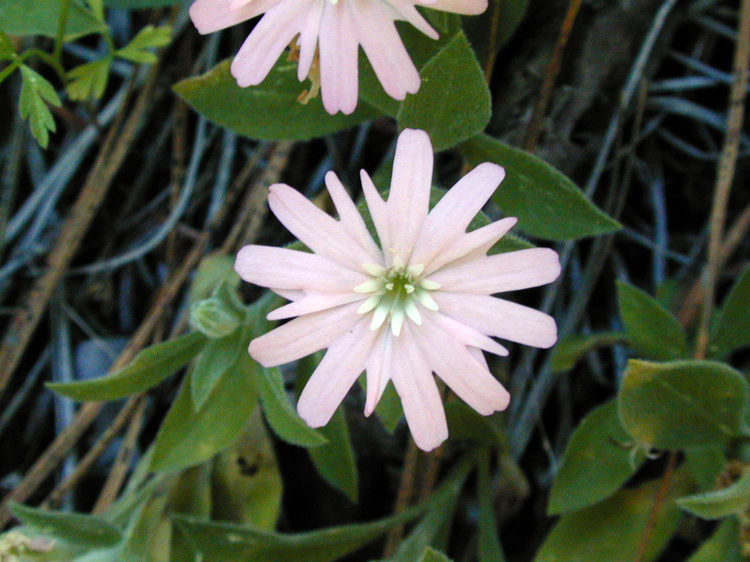

Scientific classification
- Kingdom: Plantae
- Clade: Tracheophytes
- Clade: Angiosperms
- Clade: Eudicots
- Order: Caryophyllales
- Family: Caryophyllaceae
- Genus: Silene
- Species: S. hookeri

Binomial name
- Silene hookeri Nutt.

= Silene hookeri =

Species of flowering plant

Silene hookeri is a species of flowering plant in the family Caryophyllaceae known by the common names Hooker's silene, Hooker's catchfly, Hooker's Indian pink, and Hooker's glandular campion.

It is native to the coastal and inland mountains of Oregon and northwestern California, where it grows in woodlands and forests in sandy and rocky soils, sometimes on serpentine, up to elevations around 1400 meters.

== Description ==
Silene hookeri is a squat perennial herb producing a decumbent or upright stem up to 20 centimeters long from a woody, branching caudex. It is covered in soft gray curly or crinkly hairs. The leaves are lance-shaped and up to 9 centimeters long near the base of the plant; smaller, narrower leaves occur higher up the stems.

Each flower has a tubular calyx of fused sepals lined with ten veins and covered in whitish hairs. It is open at the tip, revealing five white, pink or purple petals. The petal tips are each divided into usually four lobes, which may be wide and rounded or narrow and fringelike. Small, upright appendages occur at the petal bases.
