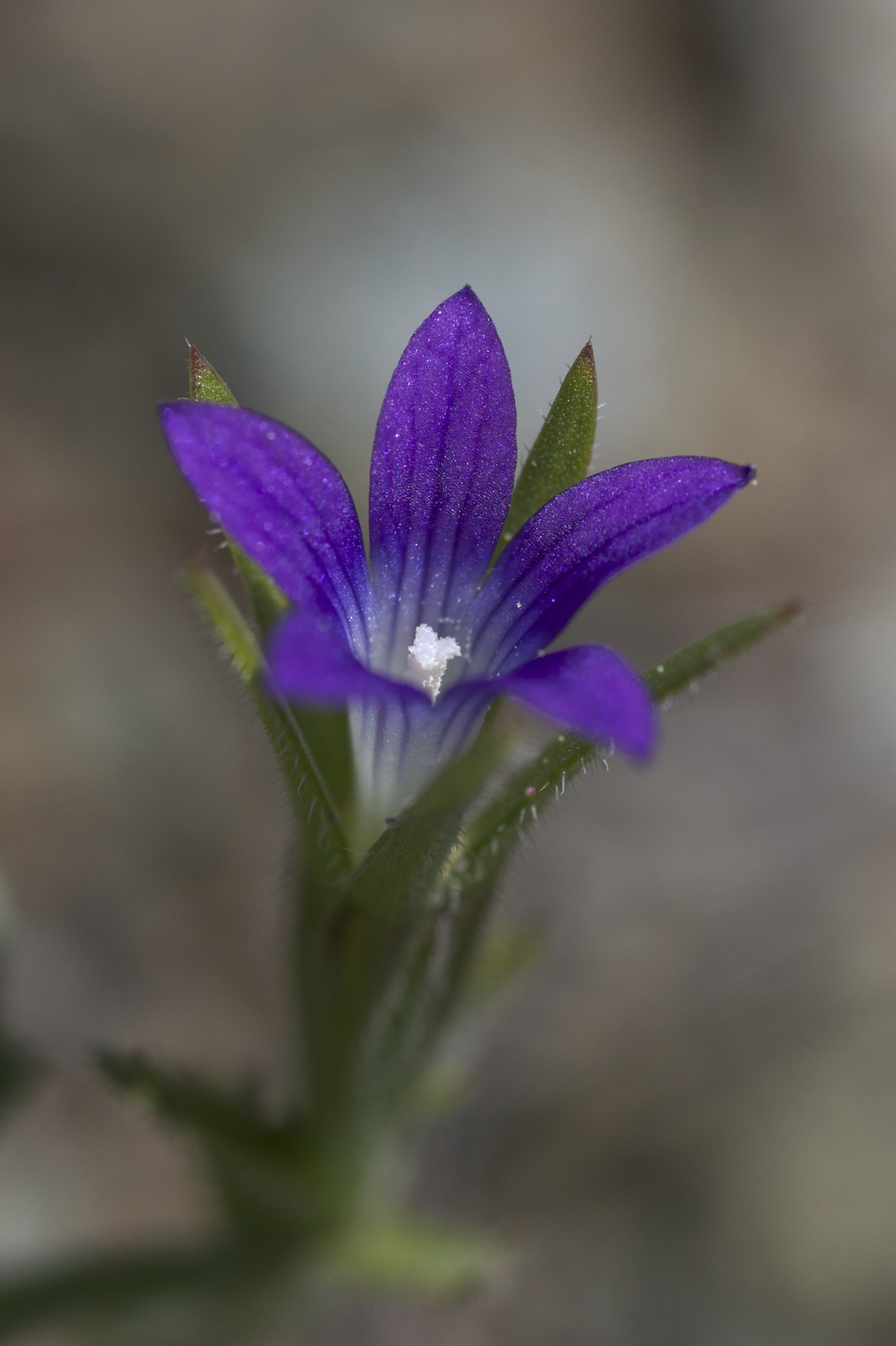

Scientific classification
- Kingdom: Plantae
- Clade: Tracheophytes
- Clade: Angiosperms
- Clade: Eudicots
- Clade: Asterids
- Order: Asterales
- Family: Campanulaceae
- Genus: Githopsis
- Species: G. specularioides

Binomial name
- Githopsis specularioides Nutt.

= Githopsis specularioides =

Species of flowering plant

Githopsis specularioides is a flowering plant known by the common name common bluecup. It is an annual herb which bears very small tubular flowers with white throats and five pointed purple petals. It is found on the west coast of North America from California to British Columbia.
