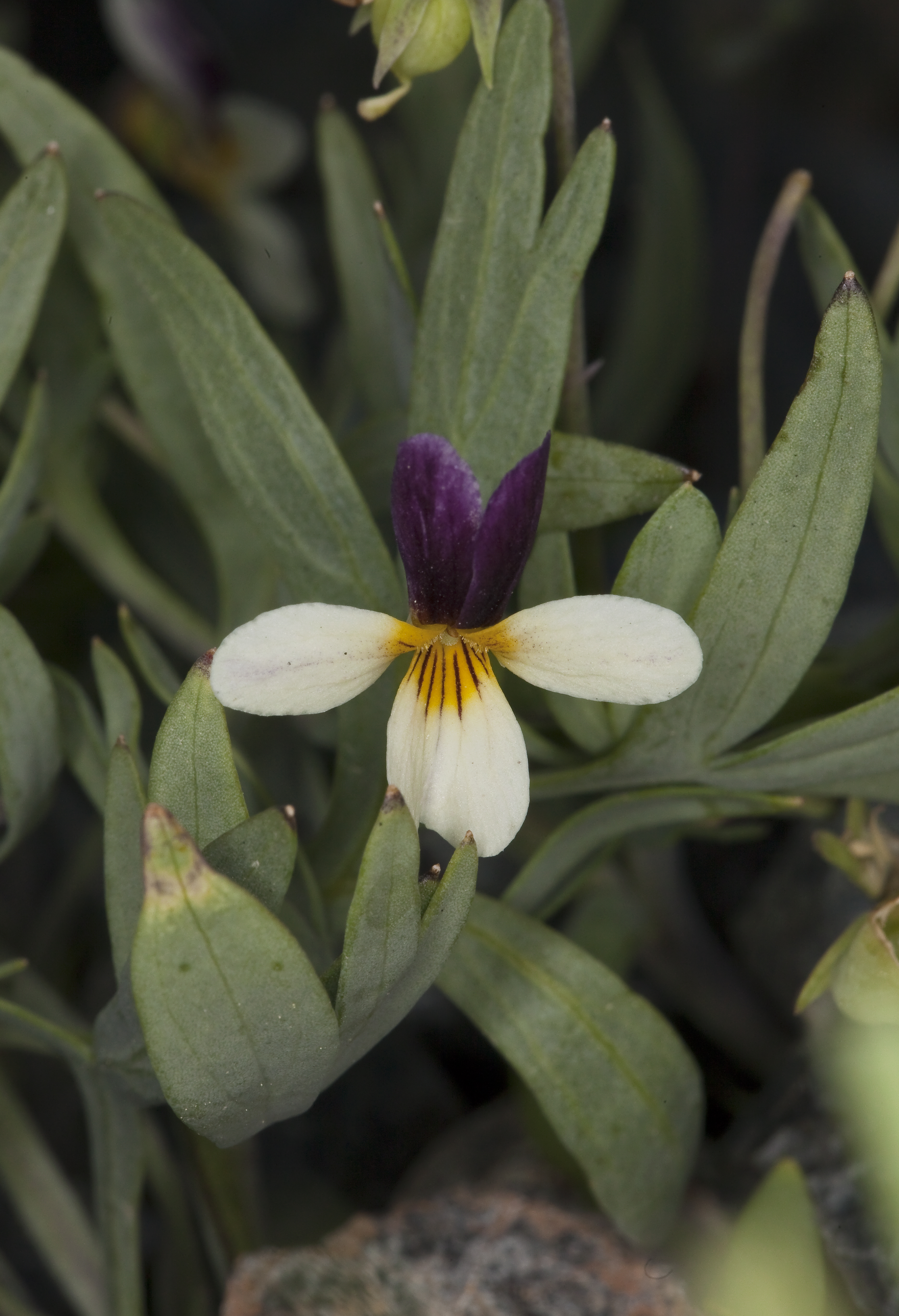

Conservation status
- Apparently Secure (NatureServe)

Scientific classification
- Kingdom: Plantae
- Clade: Tracheophytes
- Clade: Angiosperms
- Clade: Eudicots
- Clade: Rosids
- Order: Malpighiales
- Family: Violaceae
- Genus: Viola
- Species: V. hallii

Binomial name
- Viola hallii A.Gray

= Viola hallii =

Species of flowering plant

Viola hallii is a species of violet known by the common names Oregon violet and Hall's violet. It is native to southwestern Oregon and northwestern California, where it occurs in open areas in the forests and chaparral of the coastal mountain ranges, on gravelly soils, often of serpentine origin.

== Description ==
This rhizomatous herb produces a cluster of hairless stems reaching a maximum height of about 22 centimeters. The leaves are each divided into three fleshy leaflets which are deeply divided into lance-shaped lobes and borne on short petioles, very similar to Viola beckwithii. A solitary flower is borne on a long, upright stem. It has five petals, the lower three cream-colored with yellow bases and red veining, and the upper two dark red or purplish.

Also found in the Douglas County area of SW Oregon, the two upper petals are not solid purple. Viola hallii may have white front facing with dark purple back on the two upper petals.
