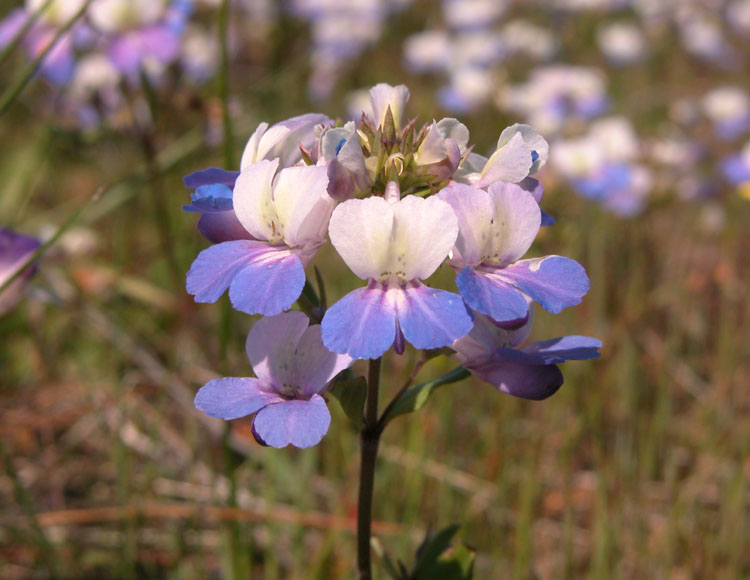

Scientific classification
- Kingdom: Plantae
- Clade: Tracheophytes
- Clade: Angiosperms
- Clade: Eudicots
- Clade: Asterids
- Order: Lamiales
- Family: Plantaginaceae
- Genus: Collinsia
- Species: C. grandiflora

Binomial name
- Collinsia grandiflora Lindl.

= Collinsia grandiflora =

Species of flowering plant

Collinsia grandiflora is a species of flowering plant in the plantain family known by the common names giant blue eyed Mary and large-flowered collinsia. This wildflower is native to western North America from British Columbia to northern California where it grows in coniferous understory and woodland.

== Description ==
This is an erect annual herb reaching about 35 centimeters in maximum height. It produces a thin stem and narrow leaves and looks grasslike before flowering. It produces a showy inflorescence which is separated into interrupted levels, with each level producing a row of one to several flowers. Each pea-like flower is just over a centimeter wide and bright purple with white upper lips. The fruit is a capsule containing four seeds. The plant is relatively small, but its features are larger than most other Collinsia, hence its common names.
