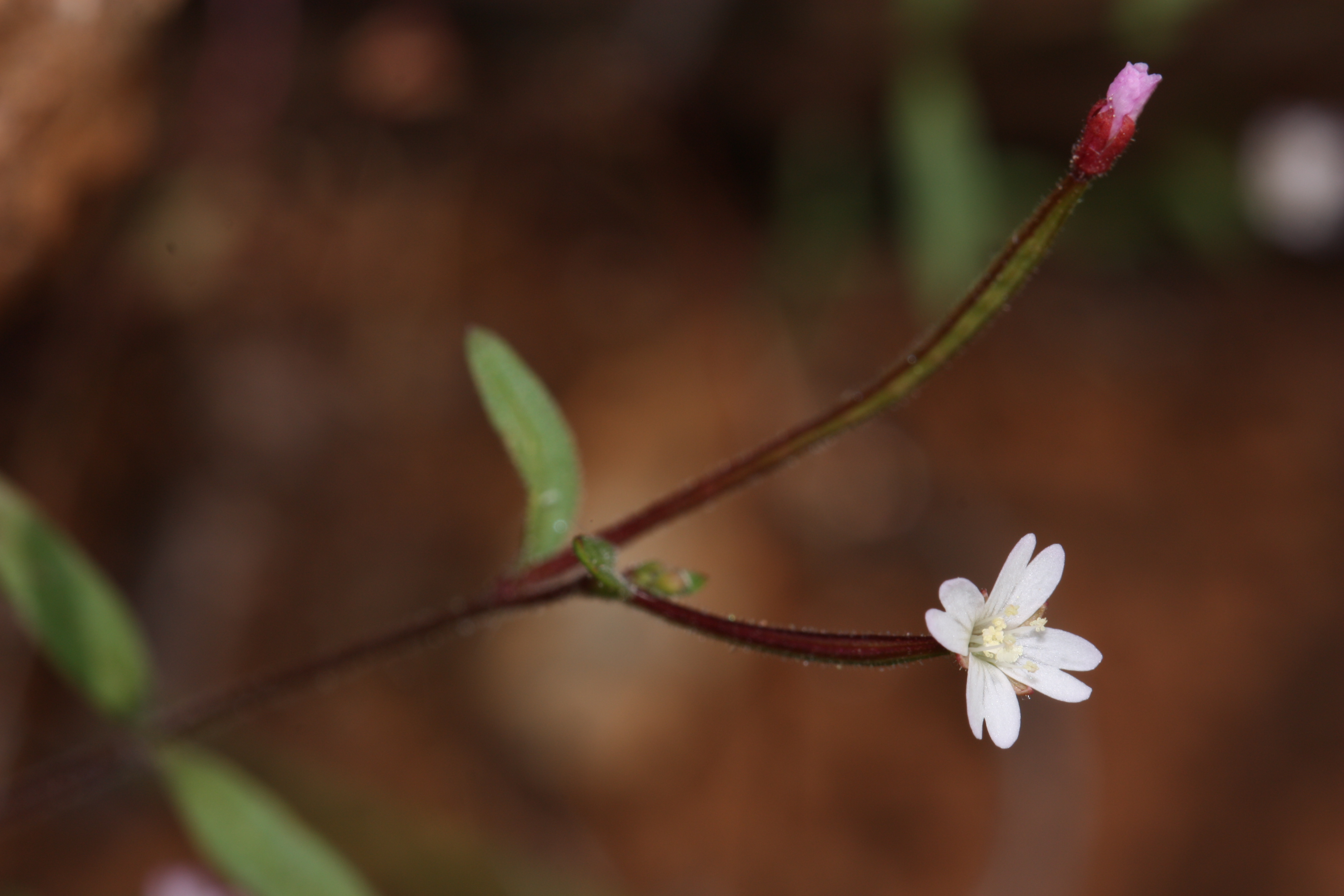
- Epilobium minutum flower

Scientific classification
- Kingdom: Plantae
- Clade: Embryophytes
- Clade: Tracheophytes
- Clade: Spermatophytes
- Clade: Angiosperms
- Clade: Eudicots
- Clade: Rosids
- Order: Myrtales
- Family: Onagraceae
- Genus: Epilobium
- Species: E. minutum

Binomial name
- Epilobium minutum Lindl. ex Lehm.

Synonyms
- Crossostigma lindleyi Spach; Epilobium lindleyi Rydb.; Epilobium flexuosum Nutt. ex Hausskn.; Epilobium minutum var. biolettii Greene; Epilobium minutum var. canescens Suksd.

= Epilobium minutum =

Species of flowering plant in the willowherb family

Epilobium minutum is a species of flowering plant, known by the common names little willowherb, chaparral willowherb and desert willowherb, in the family Onagraceae. It is also called "smallflower willowherb" in reference to its relatively small size. However that name, in particular the British English variant "small-flowered willowherb", typically refers to Epilobium parviflorum.

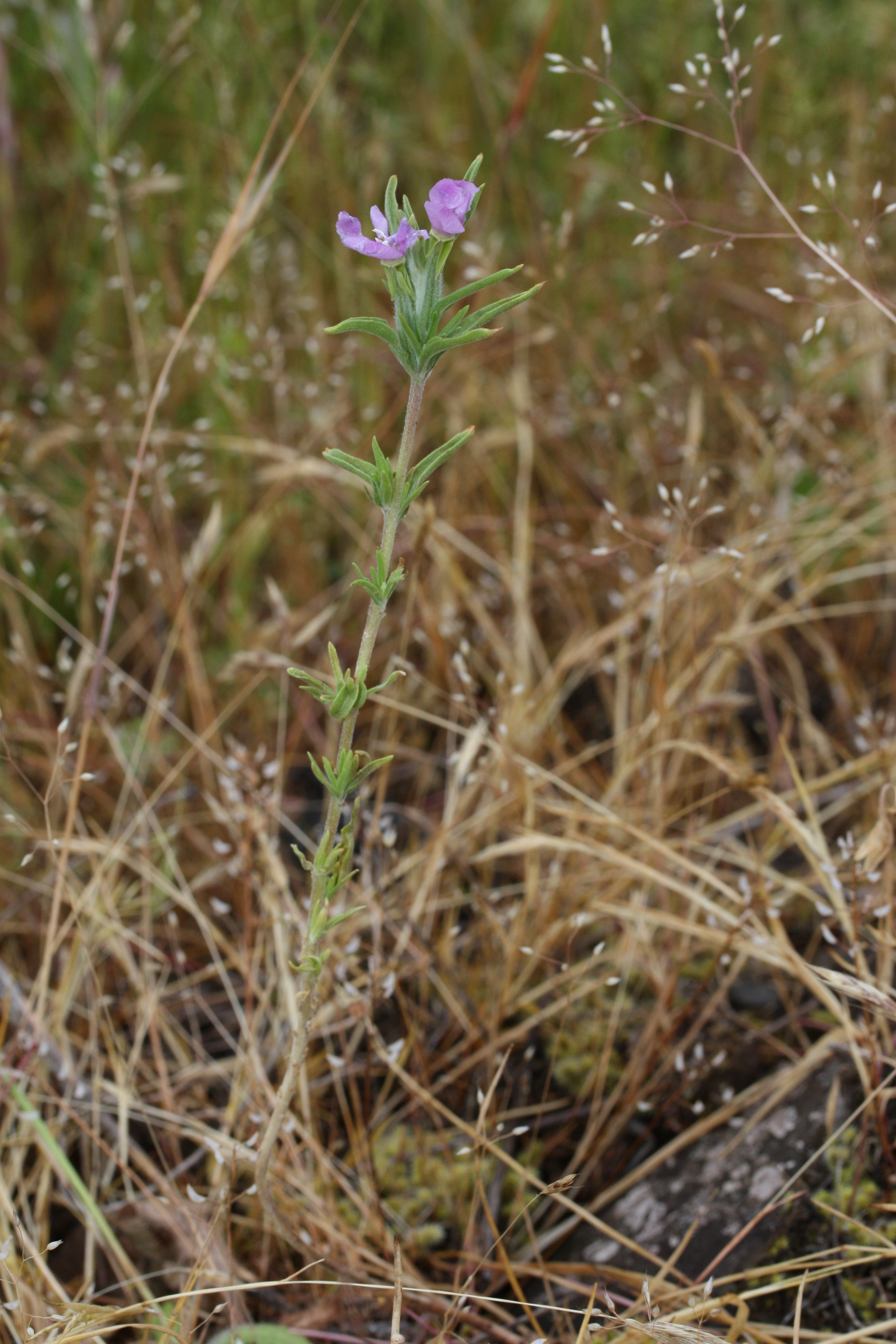
Epilobium minutum at the Kingston Prairie Preserve, Stayton, Oregon

This annual wildflower is native to western North America from British Columbia and Alberta to California and Arizona. This is a plant of fields and meadows, including vernal pools, and it is one of the first flowers to spring up in areas recently cleared by wildfire.

== Description ==
Epilobium minutum is a small, spindly plant with thin, branching stems approaching a maximum of 40 centimeters (16 in) in height. The sparse leaves are oval-shaped and 1 or 2 centimeters (0.39 or 0.79 in) long. The stems are topped with few tiny white to light purple flowers with notched petals each a few millimeters long. The fruit is a capsule 1 or 2 centimeters (0.39 or 0.79 in) in length. It is a much smaller plant than most members of the genus, referenced by both the specific name minutum as well as some of its common names.
