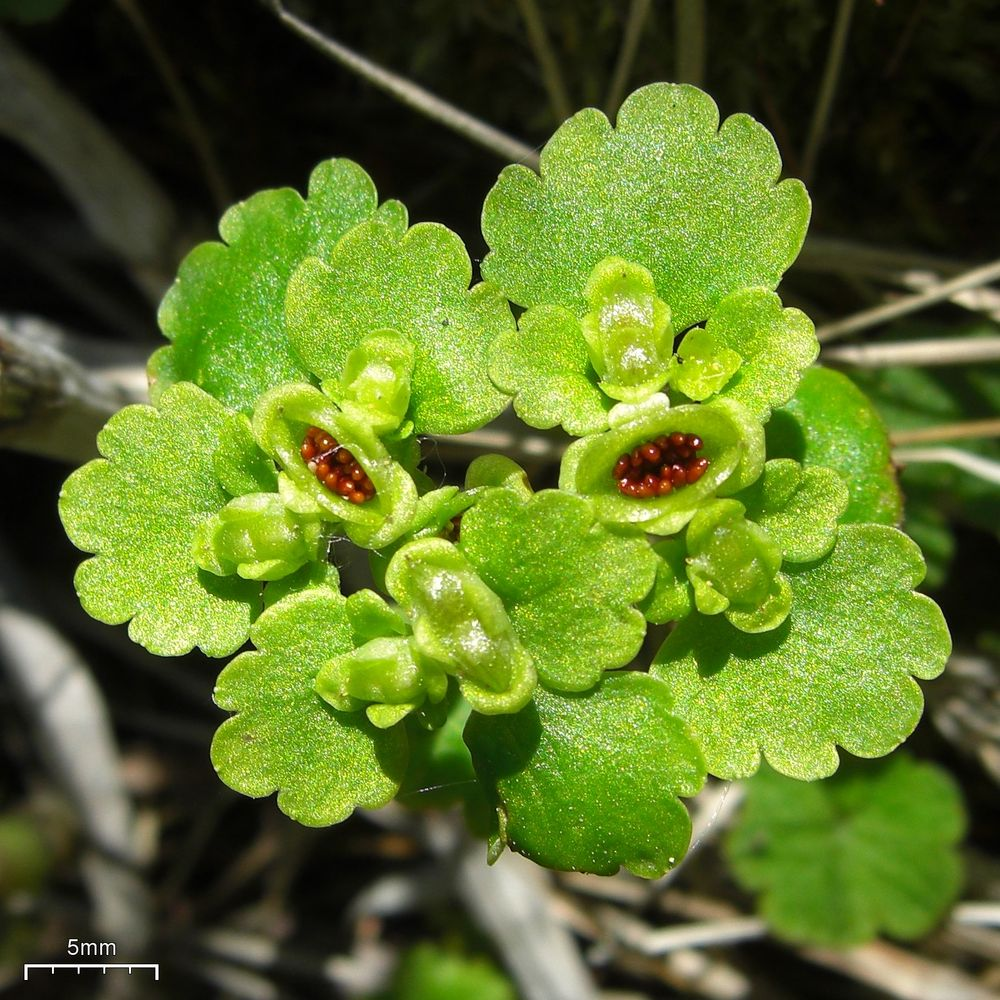

Conservation status
- Apparently Secure (NatureServe)

Scientific classification
- Kingdom: Plantae
- Clade: Tracheophytes
- Clade: Angiosperms
- Clade: Eudicots
- Order: Saxifragales
- Family: Saxifragaceae
- Genus: Chrysosplenium
- Species: C. iowense

Binomial name
- Chrysosplenium iowense Rydb.

= Chrysosplenium iowense =

Species of flowering plant

Chrysosplenium iowense is a species of flowering plant in the saxifrage family known by the common name Iowa golden-saxifrage. It is native to North America, where it is "primarily a Canadian species", occurring from the northern Northwest Territories south to British Columbia and east to Manitoba. There are also disjunct, relictual occurrences within the United States, in the Driftless Area of Minnesota and Iowa.

== Description ==
Chrysosplenium iowense is a small easily unnoticed plant with upright hairless stems. It is stoloniferous, with thin stolons and stems up to 15 centimetres (5.9 in) tall. Flowering stems are not produced during the first season. Leaves occur on the stolons and the stems. The leaves are alternately arranged on the stems, with the lower leaves roundish in shape with seven to eleven lobes. The top two leaves are adnate (joined together) to the inflorescence branches. The inflorescence is a cyme of up to 12 flowers with leaflike yellow-green bracts and small yellow or greenish sepals. The flowers have yellow anthers. The production of flowers varies by temperature, with the maximum flowering occurring when the substrate is around 11 to 12 °C (52 to 54 °F). Plants require insects for pollination. The cuplike fruit capsule contains many reddish seeds.

== Habitat ==
Populations of Chrysosplenium iowense are generally small, containing no more than a few hundred individuals. They inhabitant wet and moist streambanks and woods. In the southern part of its range this northern species occurs and persists in spots that are always cool to cold, such as ice caves and tunnels carrying cold air. In the US it is found on algific (cold producing) talus slopes derived from dolomite; where cold air seeps down from ice-caves on north facing slopes. These cool moist habitats are very limited in size, some being only a one square meter. Other species that are restricted to these relic boreal locations include Carex media, Adoxa moschatellina, and several endemic land snails.

Associated plants include Abies balsamea, Acer spicatum, Adoxa moschatellina, Betula alleghaniensis, Carex peckii, Circaea alpina, Cornus canadensis, Equisetum scirpoides, Linnaea borealis, Lycopodium spp., Maianthemum canadense, Mertensia paniculata, Rhamnus alnifolia, Ribes hudsonianum, Taxus canadensis, Trillium nivale, and Viburnum trilobum.

== Distribution ==
The US populations of Chrysosplenium iowense are likely relicts of Pleistocene flora that has survived glaciation, it now survives in boreal microhabitats. It is listed as an endangered species in Minnesota, and a threatened species in Iowa. Threats to this species include trampling and other disturbance by humans and cattle. Logging is a threat for several reasons; the machinery damages the habitat and the process of logging leads to the succession of woody vegetation, erosion, and changes in shade and hydrology. Agriculture also alters the habitat. In Alberta the plant grows in areas with busy oil and gas exploration activity. Some sources consider this species as C. alternifolium var. sibiricum.
