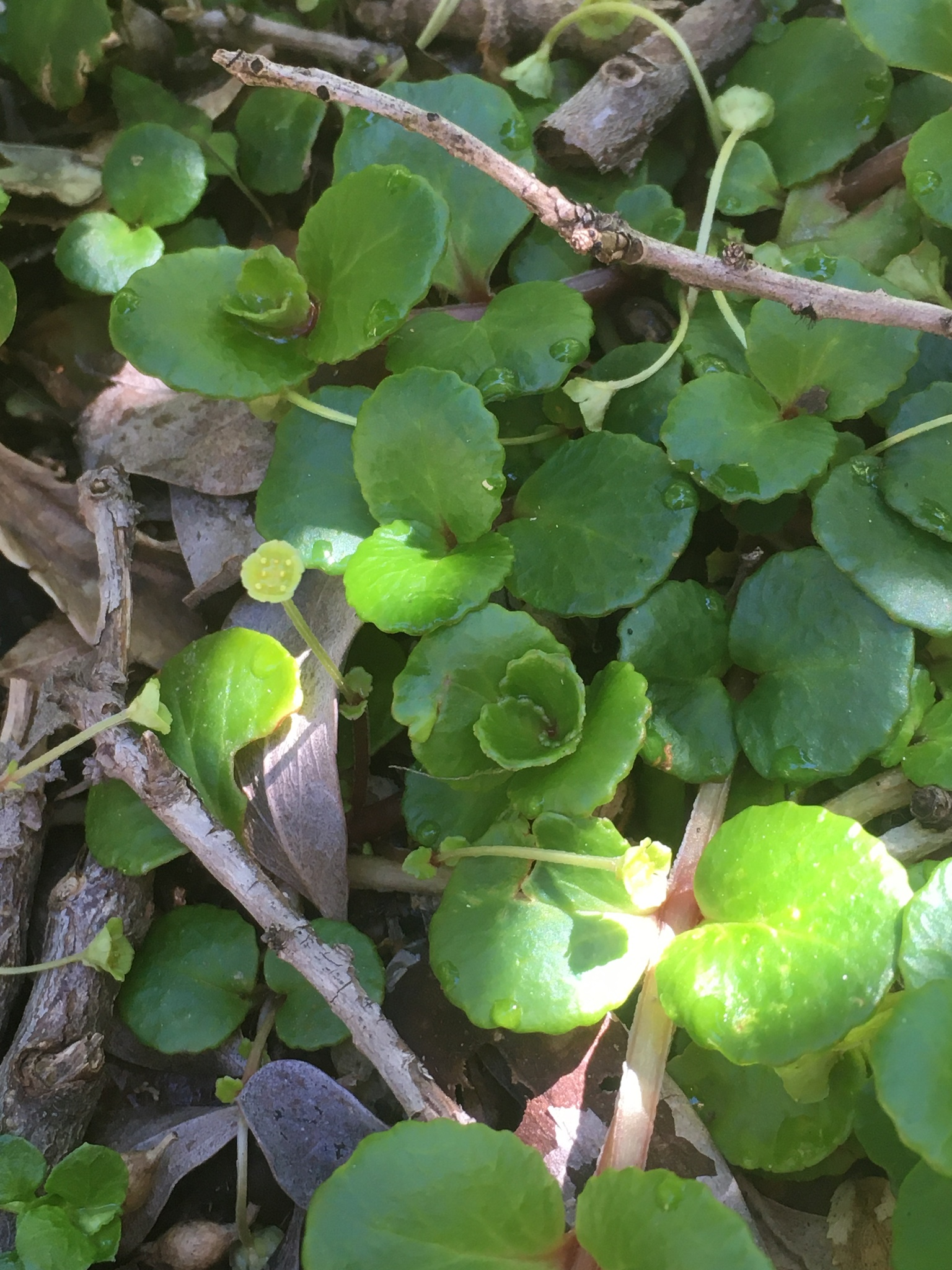

Scientific classification
- Kingdom: Plantae
- Clade: Tracheophytes
- Clade: Angiosperms
- Clade: Eudicots
- Order: Saxifragales
- Family: Saxifragaceae
- Genus: Chrysosplenium
- Species: C. valdivicum

Binomial name
- Chrysosplenium valdivicum Hook.

= Chrysosplenium valdivicum =

Species of plant

Chrysosplenium valdivicum is a species of flowering plant in the family Saxifragaceae. It is one of the two species in the genus Chrysosplenium native to southern South America, the other being Chrysosplenium macranthum. This species is native to Chile (in the Araucania, Los Rios and Los Lagos regions) and Argentina (Neuquen Province).
