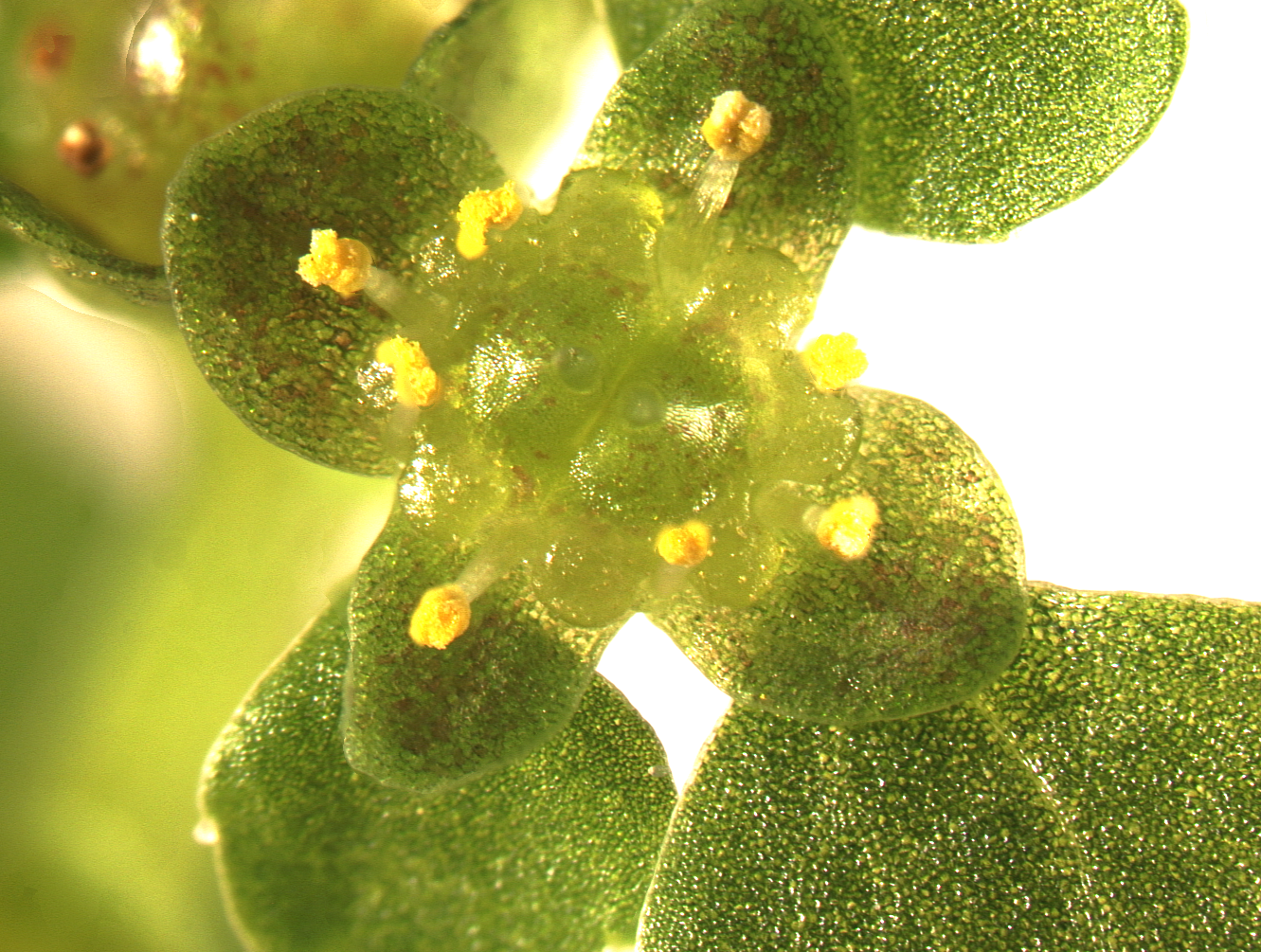
- Chrysosplenium glechomifolium flower

Conservation status
- Secure (NatureServe)

Scientific classification
- Kingdom: Plantae
- Clade: Tracheophytes
- Clade: Angiosperms
- Clade: Eudicots
- Order: Saxifragales
- Family: Saxifragaceae
- Genus: Chrysosplenium
- Species: C. glechomifolium

Binomial name
- Chrysosplenium glechomifolium Nutt.

= Chrysosplenium glechomifolium =

Species of flowering plant

Chrysosplenium glechomifolium (also, C. glechomaefolium) is a species of flowering plant in the saxifrage family known as the Pacific golden saxifrage. This plant is native to the moist coastline of western North America from British Columbia to northern California. It is a small plant with lush green foliage, bearing rounded, dully-toothed leaves and shiny green leaflike flowers. It is an uncommon plant which grows in swamps and forest understory and in the shade of taller plants.
