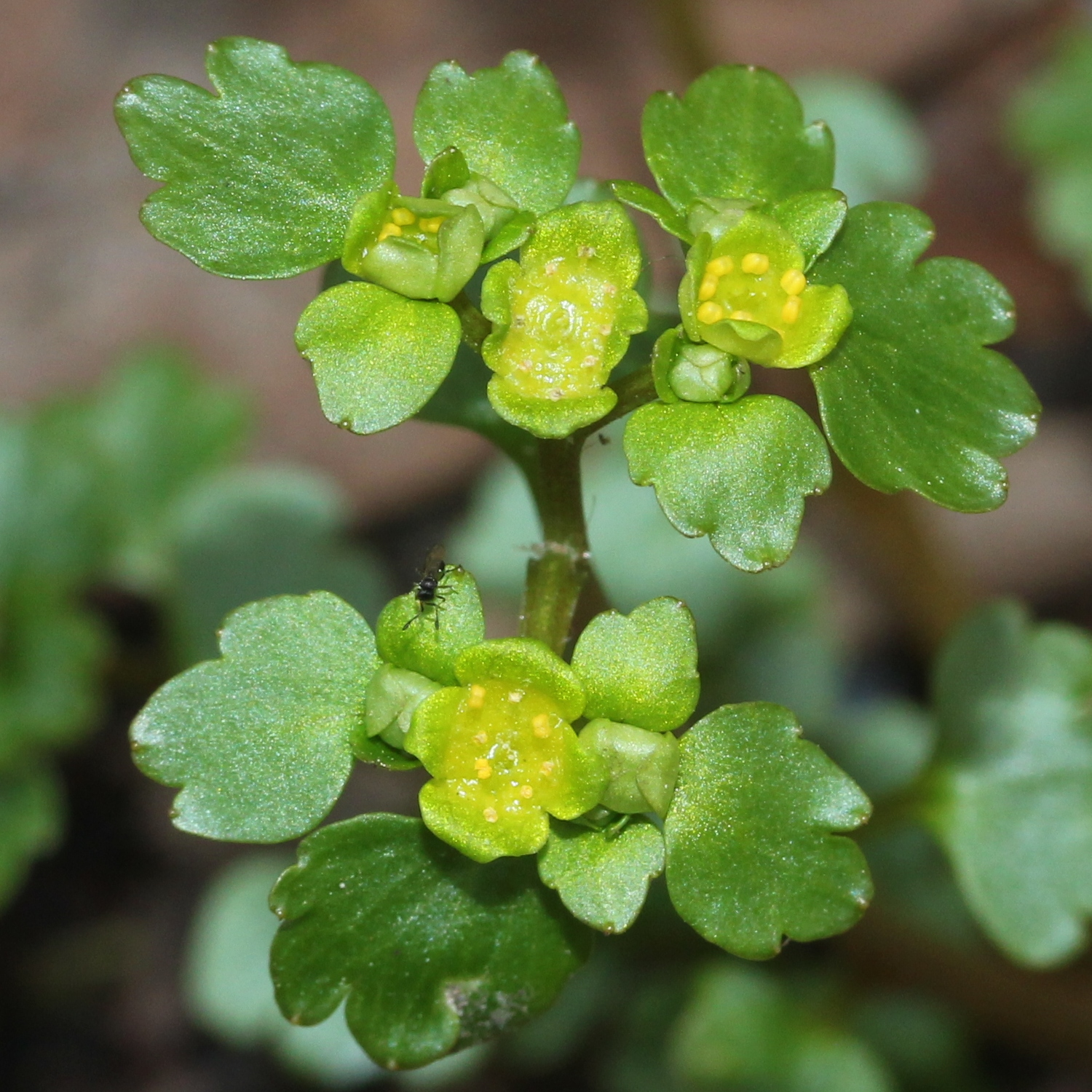

Scientific classification
- Kingdom: Plantae
- Clade: Tracheophytes
- Clade: Angiosperms
- Clade: Eudicots
- Order: Saxifragales
- Family: Saxifragaceae
- Genus: Chrysosplenium
- Species: C. flagelliferum

Binomial name
- Chrysosplenium flagelliferum F.Schmidt

Synonyms
- Chrysosplenium flagelliforme Franch. & Sav. Chrysosplenium komarovii Losinsk.

= Chrysosplenium flagelliferum =

Species of flowering plant

Chrysosplenium flagelliferum is a species of flowering plant in the saxifrage family. It was first described by Friedrich Schmidt in 1868.

It is a perennial species.

== Distribution and habitat ==
It is found in far-east Russia, Mongolia, Manchuria, Korea and Japan, and in China (Heilongjiang, Jilin, and Liaoning), growing in shade and wet places in forests and in streams at altitudes of 0-500 metres.

== Gallery ==
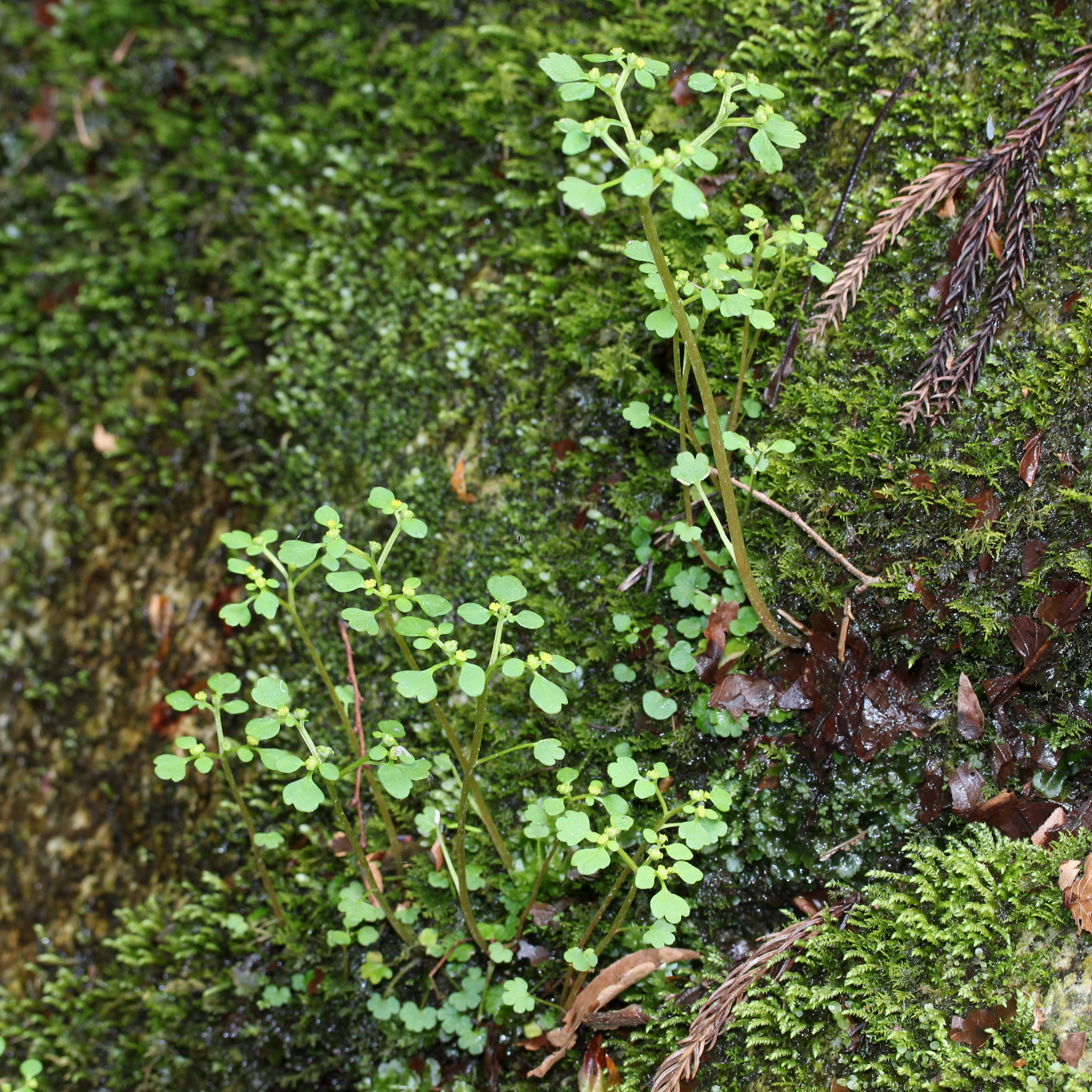
Habit & habitat

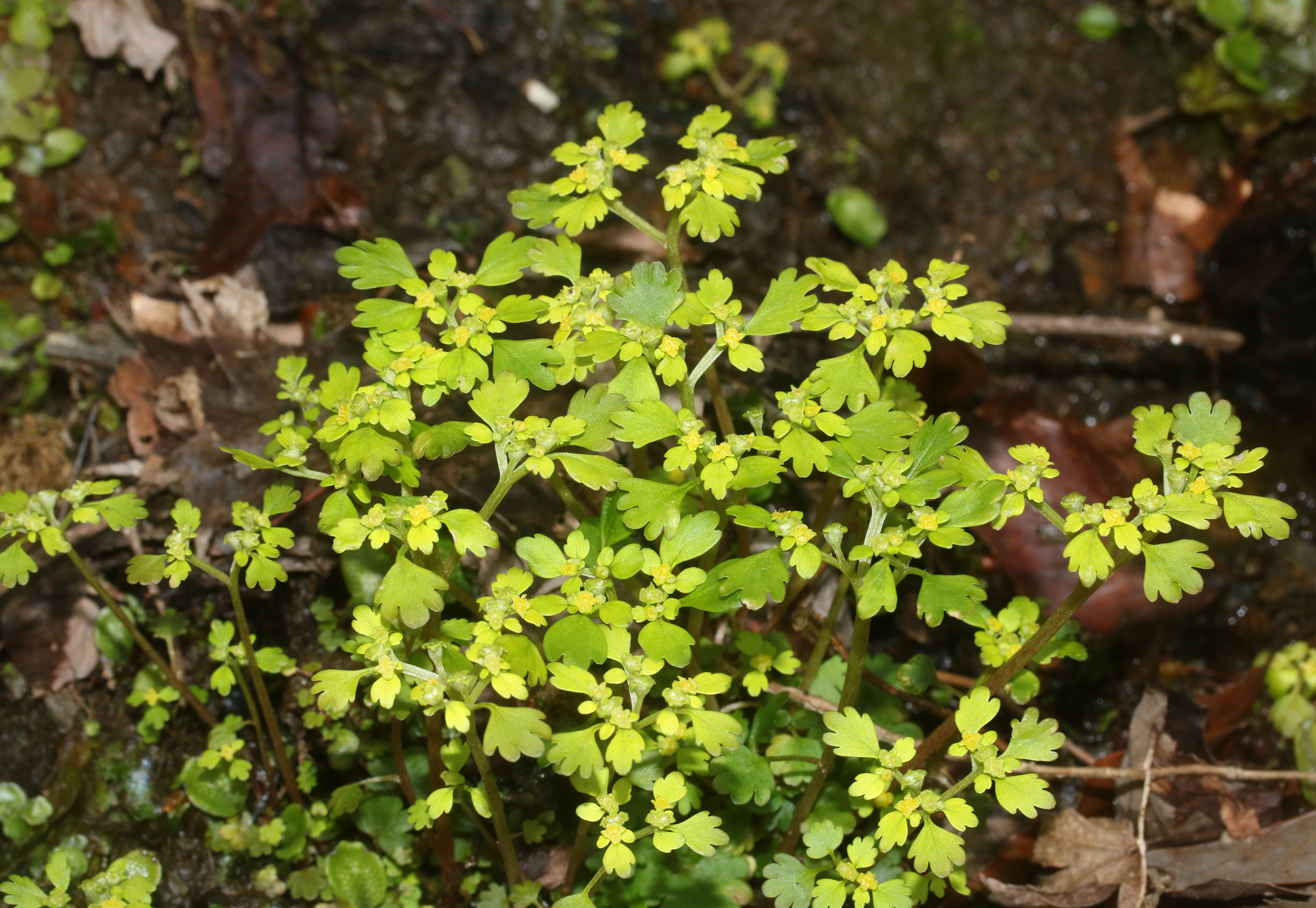

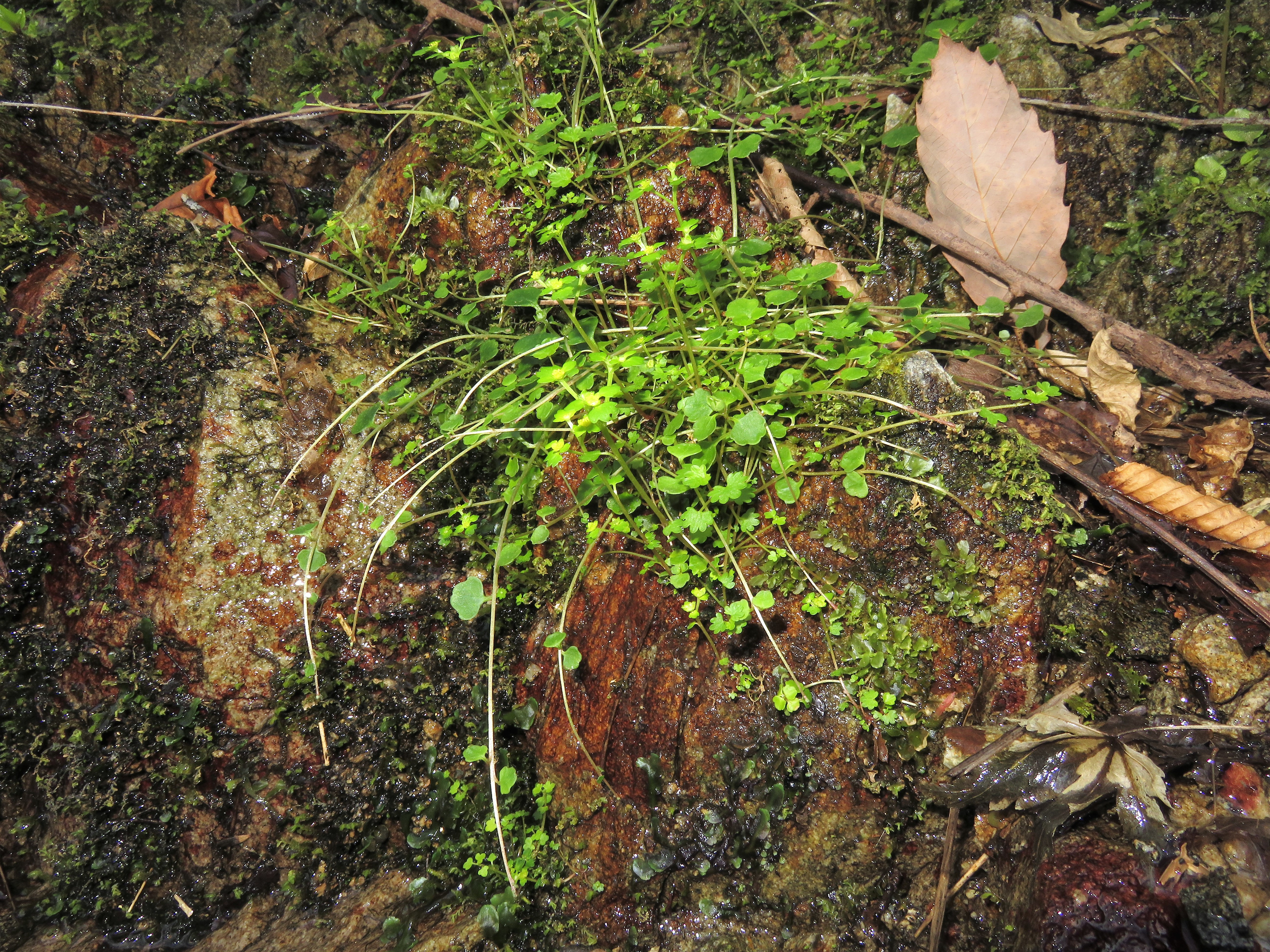

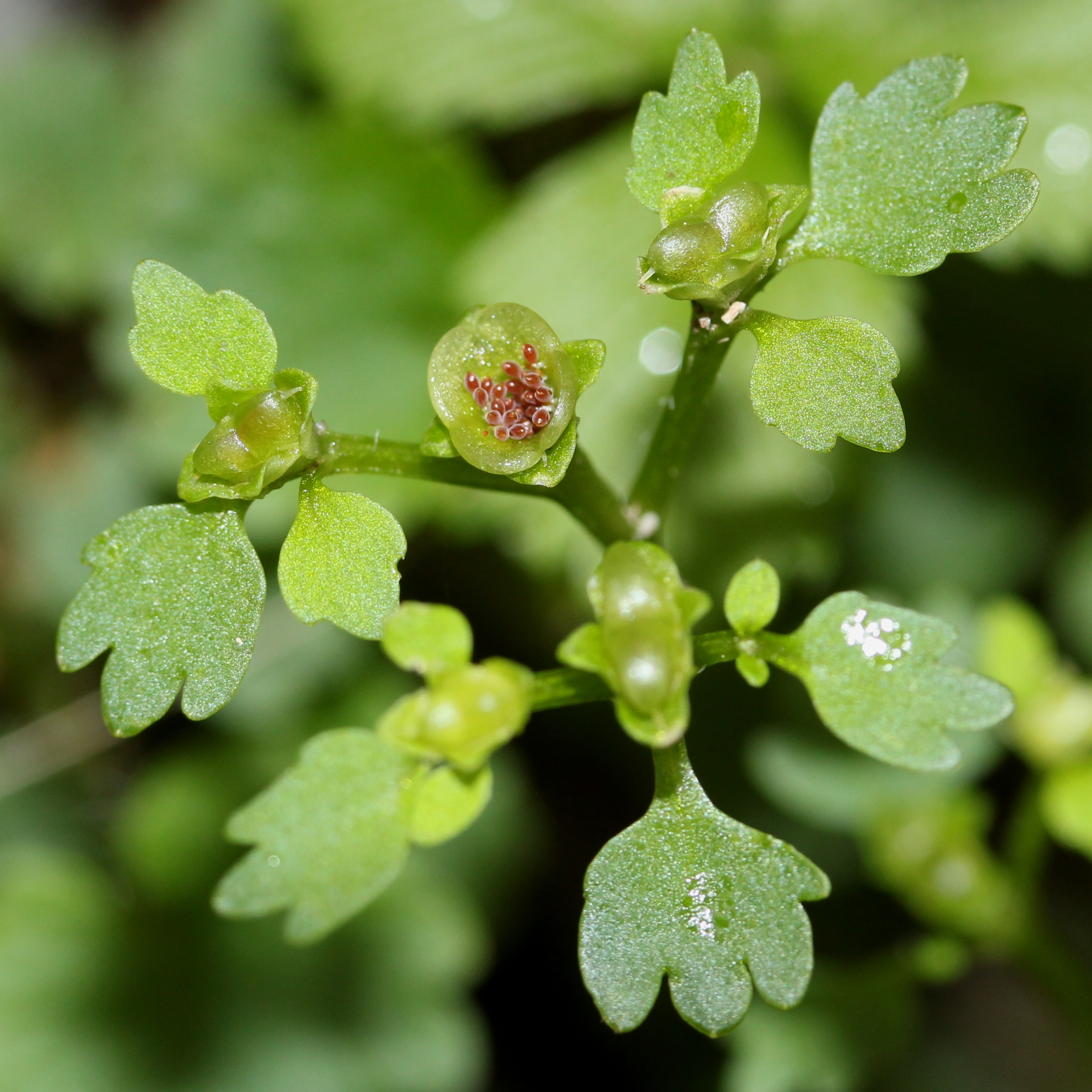
seeds
