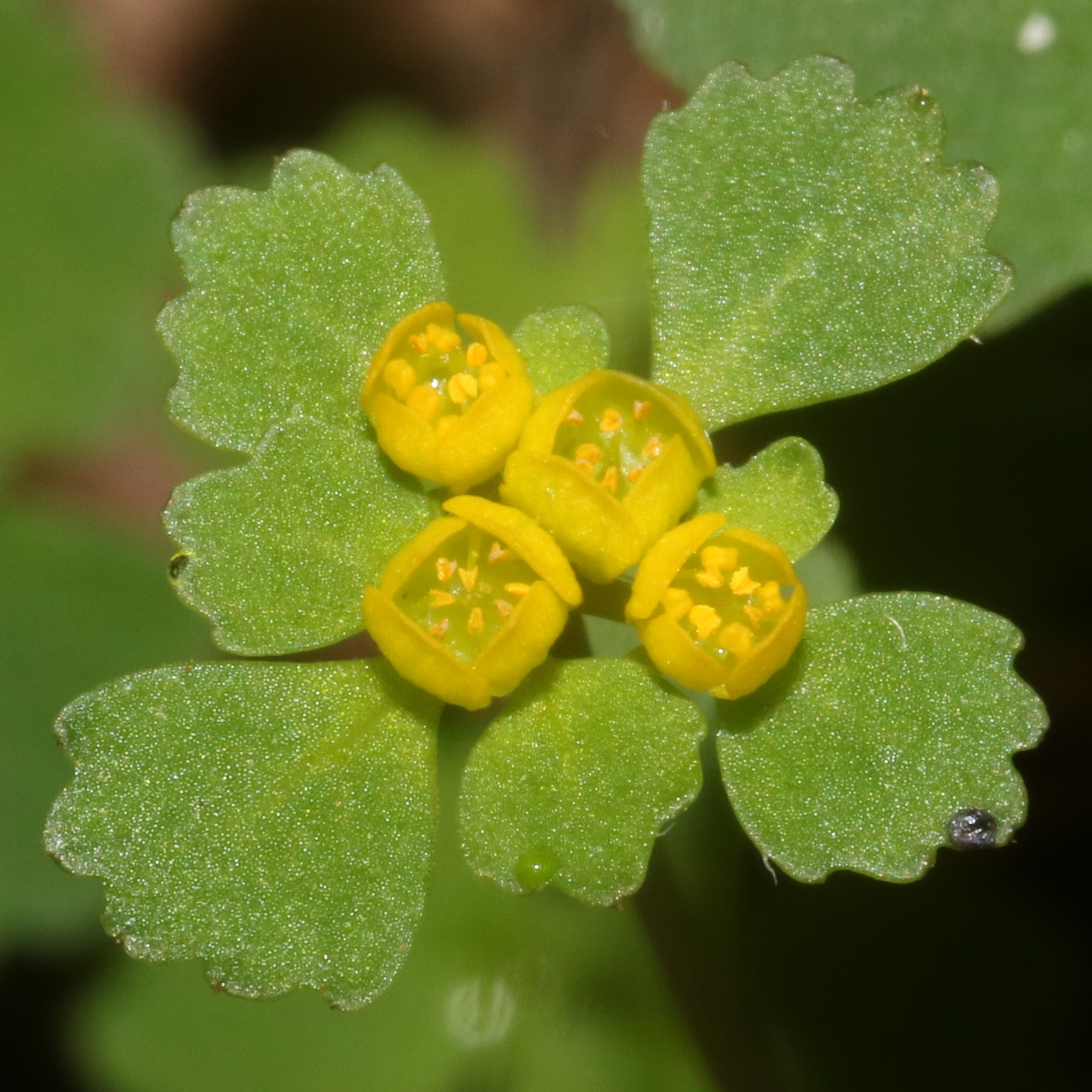
- Chrysosplenium pilosum var. sphaerospermum

Scientific classification
- Kingdom: Plantae
- Clade: Tracheophytes
- Clade: Angiosperms
- Clade: Eudicots
- Order: Saxifragales
- Family: Saxifragaceae
- Genus: Chrysosplenium
- Species: C. pilosum

Binomial name
- Chrysosplenium pilosum Maxim.

= Chrysosplenium pilosum =

Species of flowering plant

Chrysosplenium pilosum, the hairy golden saxifrage, is a species of flowering plant in the saxifrage family. It was first described by Karl Maximovich in 1859.

It is a perennial species, and the fruit is a capsule.

== Infraspecifics ==
It has a 7 infraspecifics, some with numerous synonyms.

Accepted name	Basionym
Chrysosplenium pilosum var. aureobracteatum (Y.I.Kim & Y.D.Kim) M.Kim	Chrysosplenium aureobracteatum Y.I.Kim & Y.D.Kim
Chrysosplenium pilosum var. barbatum (Nakai) M.Kim	Chrysosplenium barbatum Nakai
Chrysosplenium pilosum var. pilosopetiolatum (Z.P.Jien) J.T.Pan	Chrysosplenium pilosopetiolatum Z.P.Jien
Chrysosplenium pilosum subsp. pilosum	
Chrysosplenium pilosum subsp. schagae (Kharkev. & Vyschin) Vorosch.	Chrysosplenium schagae Kharkev. & Vyschin
Chrysosplenium pilosum var. sphaerospermum (Maxim.) H.Hara	Chrysosplenium sphaerospermum Maxim.
Chrysosplenium pilosum var. valdepilosum Ohwi	

In South Korea, where it is known as Chrysosplenium barbatum, Chrysosplenium pilosum var. barbatum is said by Plants of the World online to be found only on Jeju Island. However, the South Korean authority states that it is found throughout Korea (and this is shown also in GBIF).

The variety aureobracteatum (yellowish-bract golden saxifrage) was first described in 2015 as the species Chrysosplenium aureabracteatum by Kim Yong-in and Kim Young-Dong, and was transferred to a variety of C. pilosum in 2017 by Kim Muyeol. This variety is found only in Korea.

== Distribution and habitat ==
It is found in far-east Russia, Mongolia, Manchuria, Korea, Japan and China, growing in shaded and moist areas of the forest understorey, and in rock crevices, at altitudes of 1500 to 3500 m.

== Gallery ==
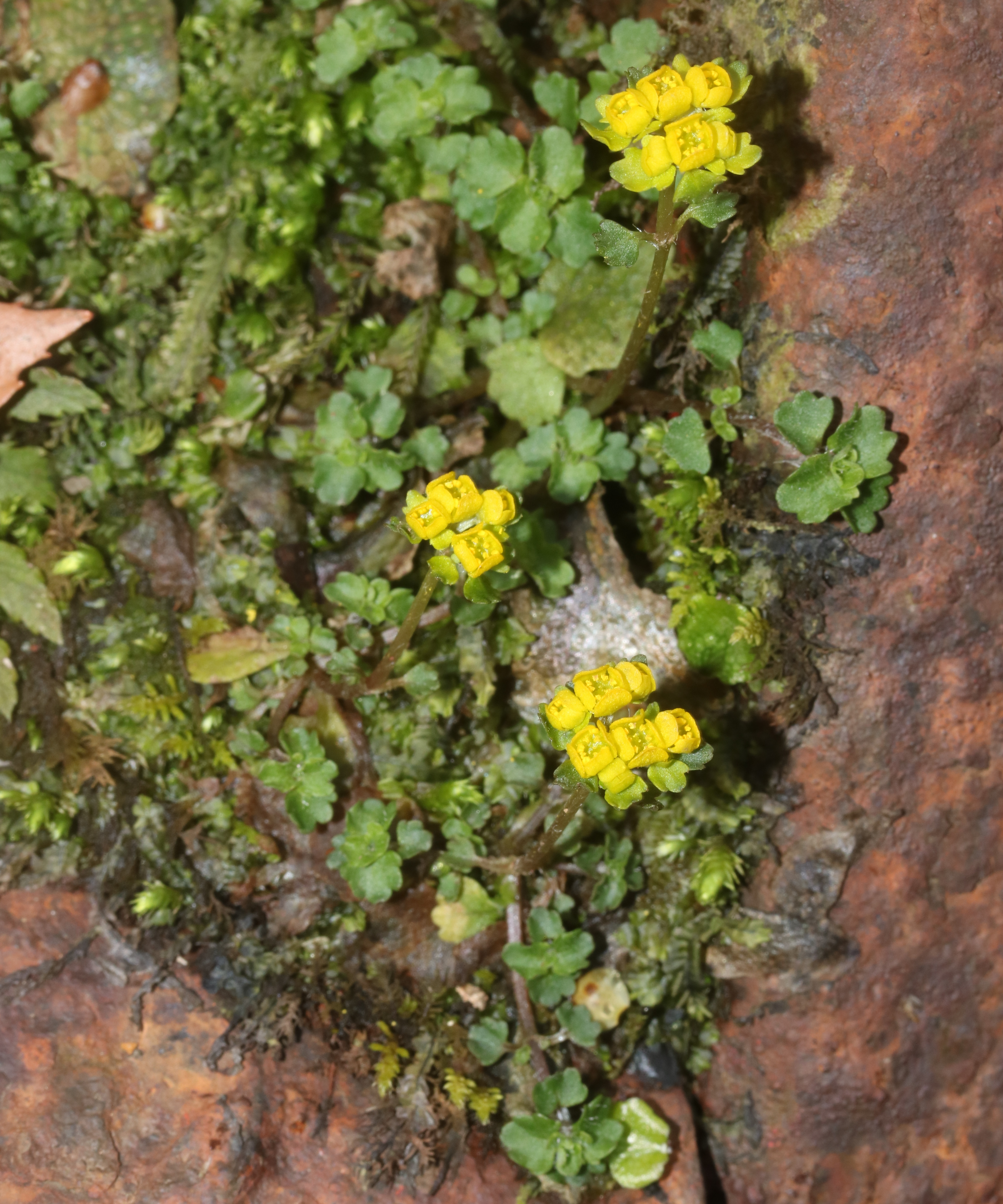
Habit & habitat

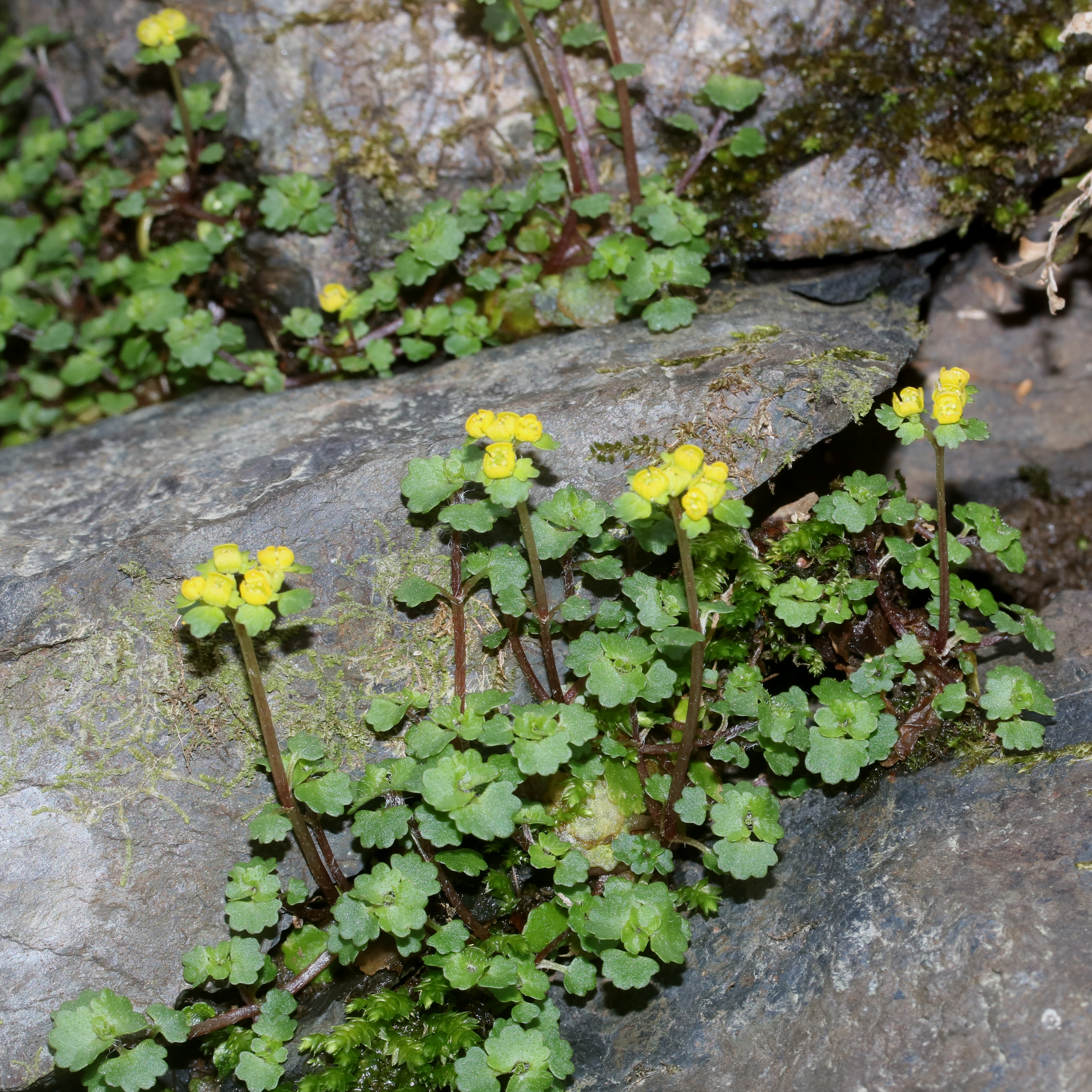

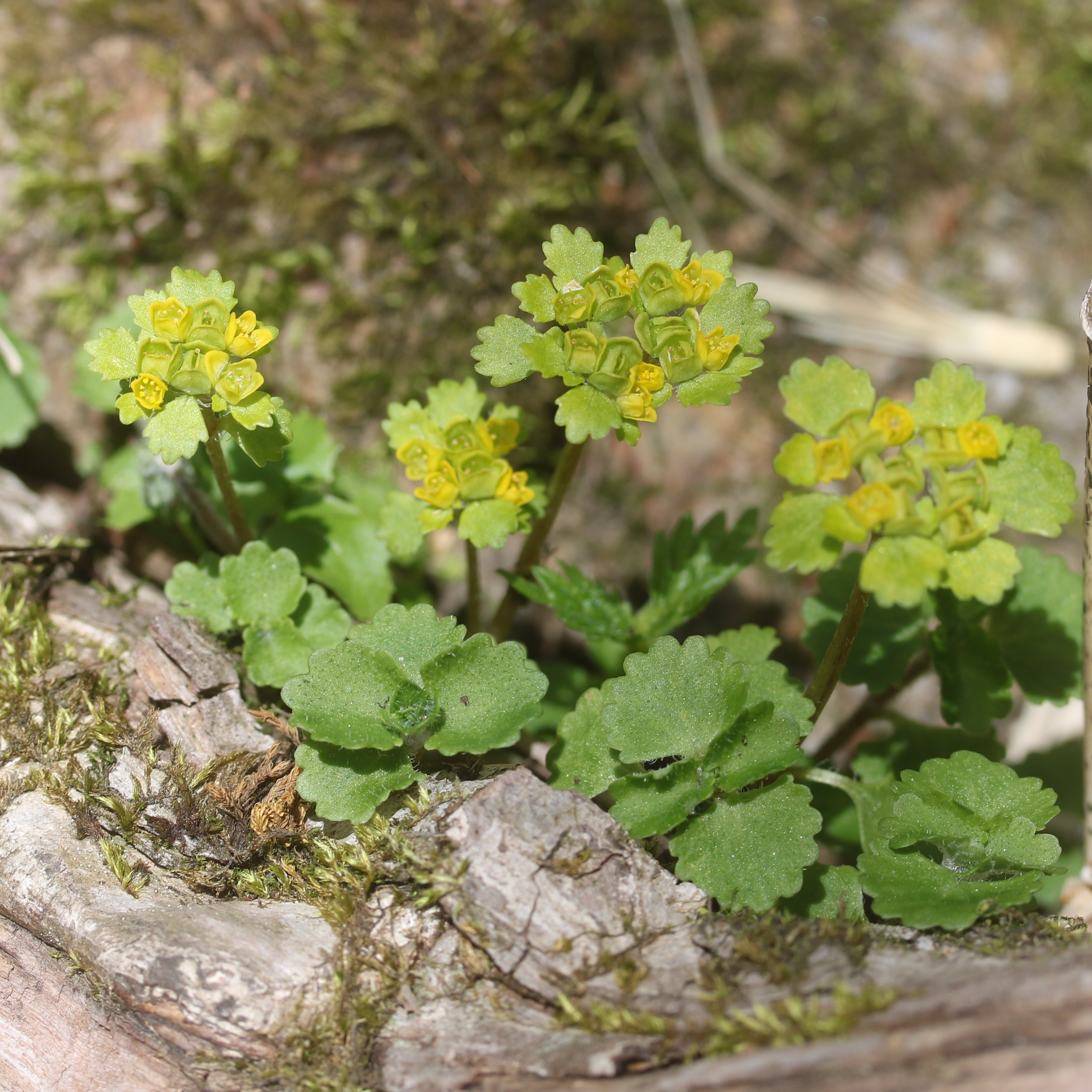
