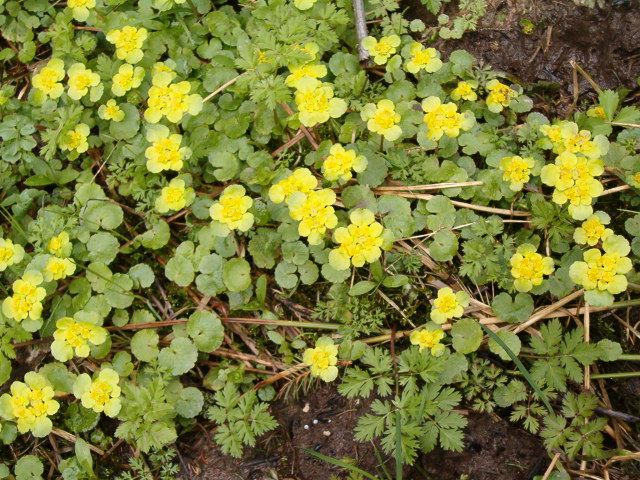
- Chrysosplenium alternifolium

Scientific classification
- Kingdom: Plantae
- Clade: Tracheophytes
- Clade: Angiosperms
- Clade: Eudicots
- Order: Saxifragales
- Family: Saxifragaceae
- Genus: Chrysosplenium; L. (1753)

Species
- 84; see text

= Chrysosplenium =

Genus of flowering plants

Chrysosplenium (golden saxifrage or golden-saxifrage) is a genus of flowering plants in the family Saxifragaceae. It includes 84 species found throughout the Arctic and northern temperate parts of the Northern Hemisphere. The highest species diversity is in eastern Asia, and some species are found disjunctly in South America.

They are soft herbaceous perennial plants growing to 20 centimeters (8 in) tall, typically in wet, shady locations in forests. The leaves are rounded, palmately veined, with a lobed margin and arranged either alternately or opposite, depending on the species. The flowers are small, yellow or yellowish-green, with four petals; they are produced in small clusters at the apex of the shoots surrounded by leafy bracts. Most of the growth and flowering is in early spring, when more light is available under deciduous trees.

== Species ==
84 species are accepted.

- Chrysosplenium absconditicapsulum J.T.Pan
- Chrysosplenium albertii Malyschev
- Chrysosplenium album Maxim.
- Chrysosplenium alpinum (Schur) Schur – alpine golden saxifrage

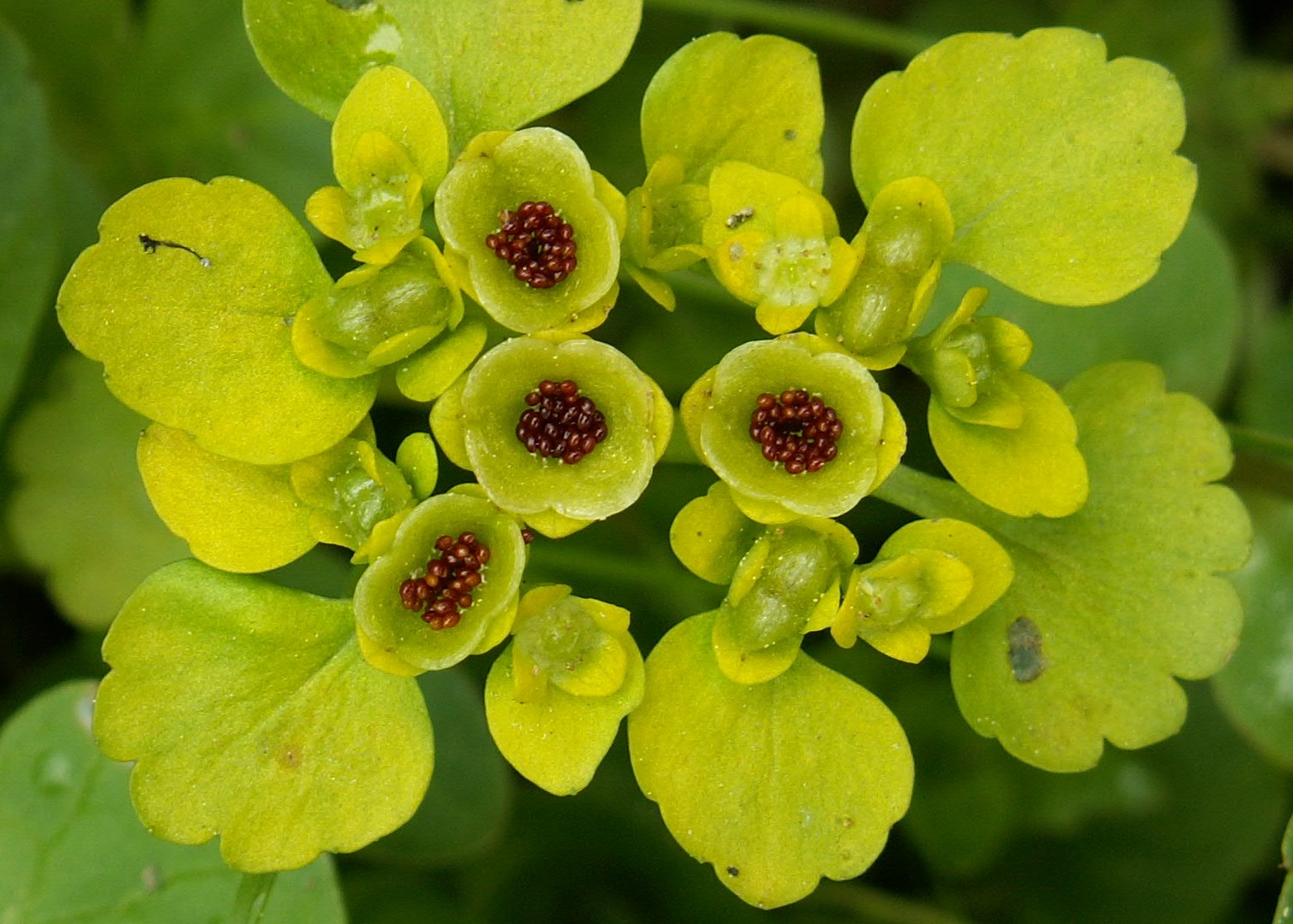
Chrysosplenium alternifolium seeds

- Chrysosplenium alternifolium L. – alternate-leaved golden saxifrage
- Chrysosplenium americanum Schwein. ex Hook. – American golden saxifrage
- Chrysosplenium arunachalense Bhaumik
- Chrysosplenium aulacocarpum Ernst
- Chrysosplenium axillare Maxim.
- Chrysosplenium baicalense Maxim.
- Chrysosplenium biondianum Engl.
- Chrysosplenium carnosum Hook.f. & Thomson
- Chrysosplenium cavaleriei H.Lév. & Vaniot
- Chrysosplenium chinense (H.Hara) J.T.Pan
- Chrysosplenium davidianum Decne. ex Maxim.
- Chrysosplenium delavayi Franch.
- Chrysosplenium dubium J.Gay ex Ser.
- Chrysosplenium echinus Maxim.
- Chrysosplenium epigealum J.W.Han & S.H.Kang
- Chrysosplenium fallax Koldaeva
- Chrysosplenium fauriei Franch.
- Chrysosplenium filipes Kom.

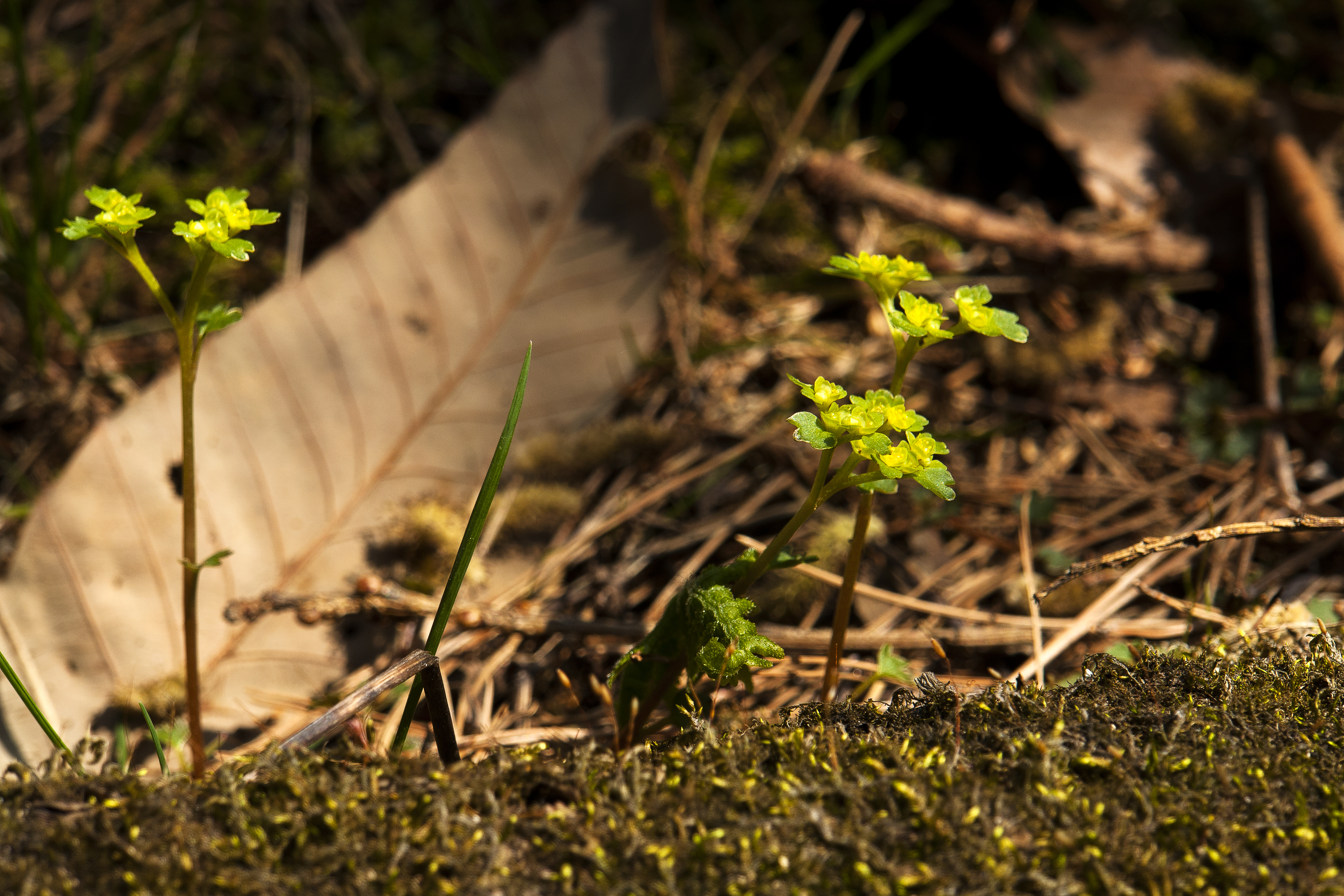
Chrysosplenium flagelliferum

- Chrysosplenium flagelliferum F.Schmidt
- Chrysosplenium flaviflorum Ohwi
- Chrysosplenium forrestii Diels
- Chrysosplenium funiushanensis S.Y.Wang
- Chrysosplenium fuscopuncticulosum Z.P.Jien
- Chrysosplenium giraldianum Engl.
- Chrysosplenium glechomifolium Nutt. – Pacific golden saxifrage
- Chrysosplenium glossophyllum H.Hara
- Chrysosplenium grayanum Maxim.
- Chrysosplenium griffithii Hook.f. & Thomson
- Chrysosplenium hebetatum Ohwi
- Chrysosplenium hydrocotylifolium H.Lév. & Vaniot
- Chrysosplenium iowense Rydb. – Iowa golden saxifrage
- Chrysosplenium japonicum (Maxim.) Makino
- Chrysosplenium jienningense W.T.Wang
- Chrysosplenium kamtschaticum Fisch. ex Ser.
- Chrysosplenium kiotense Ohwi
- Chrysosplenium krestovii Barkalov & Koldaeva
- Chrysosplenium lanuginosum Hook.f. & Thomson
- Chrysosplenium lectus-cochleae Kitag.
- Chrysosplenium lixianense Z.P.Jien ex J.T.Pan
- Chrysosplenium macranthum Hook.
- Chrysosplenium macrophyllum Oliv.
- Chrysosplenium macrospermum Y.I.Kim & Y.D.Kim
- Chrysosplenium macrostemon Maxim. ex Franch. & Sav.
- Chrysosplenium maximowiczii Franch. & Sav.
- Chrysosplenium microspermum Franch.

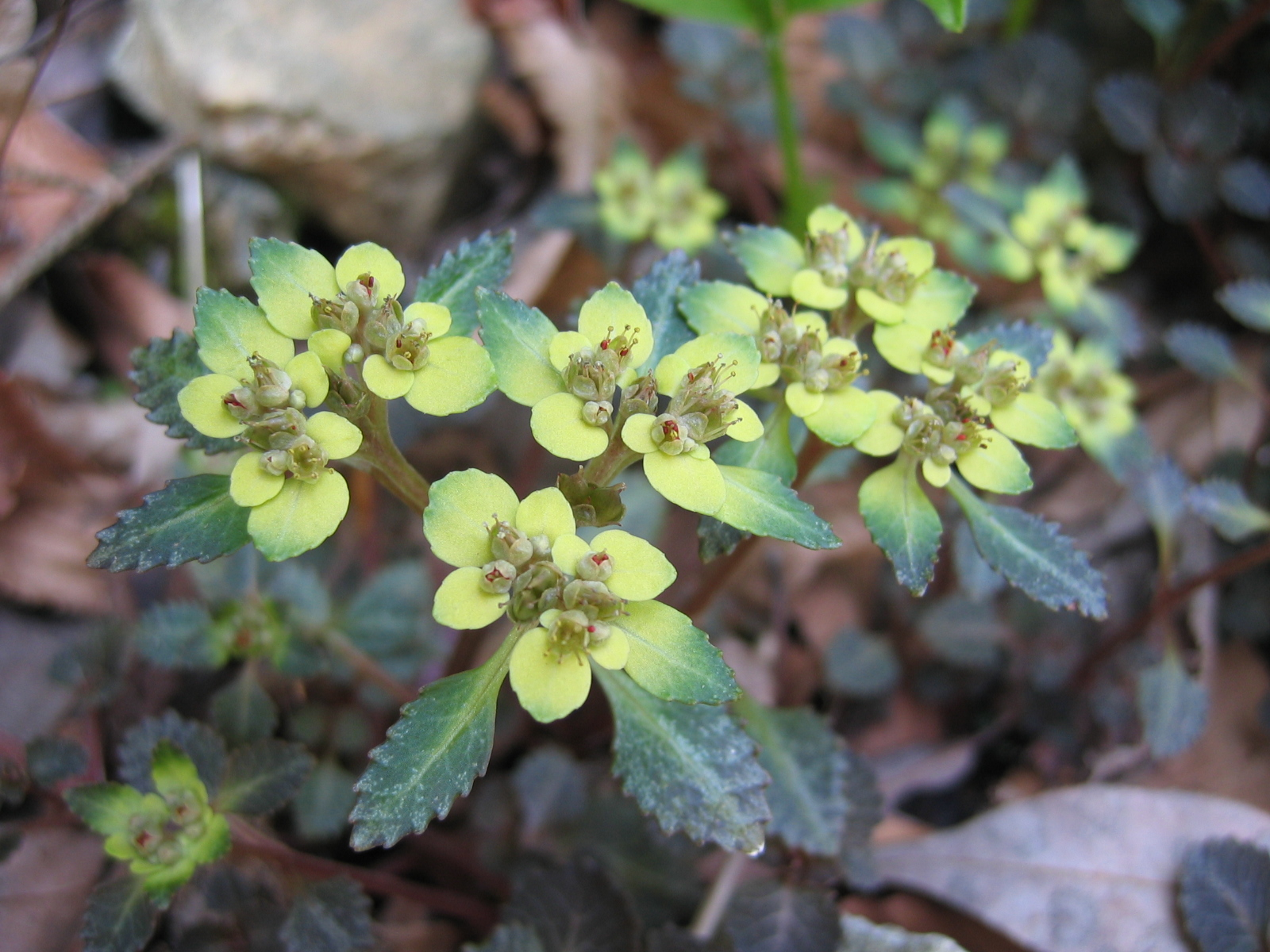
Chrysosplenium macrostemon

- Chrysosplenium nagasei Wakab. & H.Ohba
- Chrysosplenium nepalense D.Don
- Chrysosplenium nudicaule Bunge

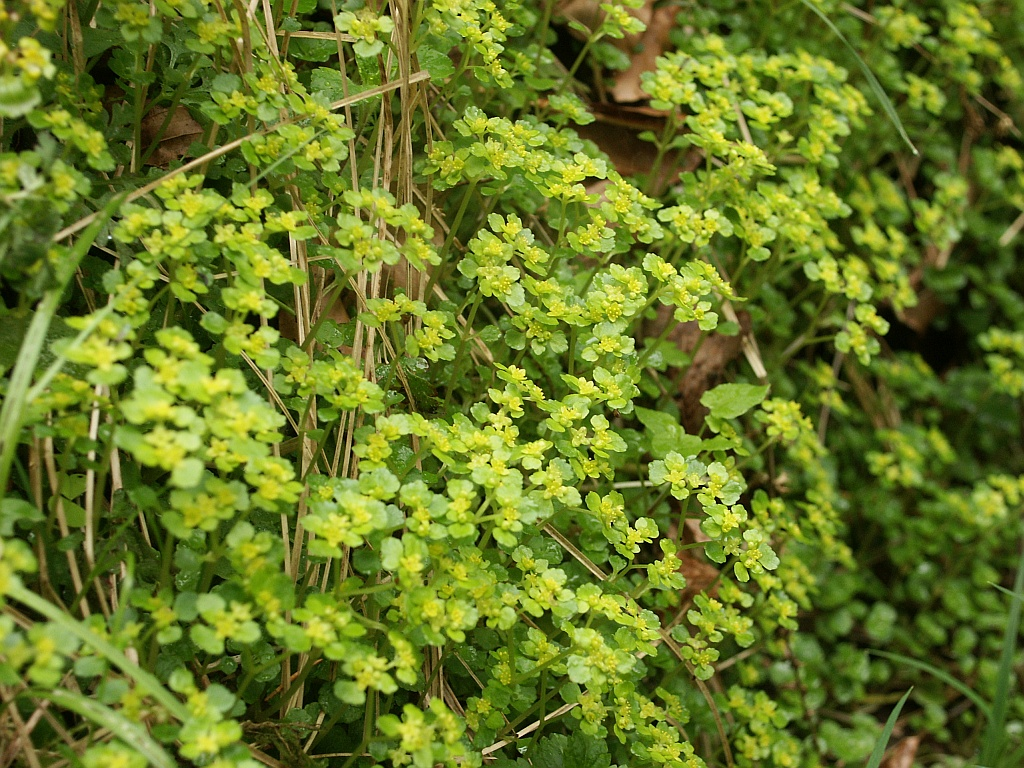
Chrysosplenium oppositifolium

- Chrysosplenium oppositifolium L. – opposite-leaved golden saxifrage
- Chrysosplenium ovalifolium M.Bieb. ex Bunge
- Chrysosplenium oxygraphoides Hand.-Mazz.
- Chrysosplenium peltatum Turcz.
- Chrysosplenium pilosum Maxim.
- Chrysosplenium pseudopilosum Wakab. & Hid.Takah.
- Chrysosplenium qinlingense Z.P.Jien ex J.T.Pan
- Chrysosplenium ramosissimum Y.I.Kim & Y.D.Kim
- Chrysosplenium ramosum Maxim.
- Chrysosplenium rhabdospermum Maxim.
- Chrysosplenium rimosum Kom.
- Chrysosplenium rosendahlii Packer
- Chrysosplenium sangzhiense Hong Liu
- Chrysosplenium sedakowii Turcz.
- Chrysosplenium serreanum Hand.-Mazz.
- Chrysosplenium sikangense H.Hara
- Chrysosplenium sinicum Maxim.
- Chrysosplenium suzukaense Wakab., Hir.Takah. & Tomita
- Chrysosplenium taibaishanense J.T.Pan
- Chrysosplenium taiwanianum S.S.Ying
- Chrysosplenium tenellum Hook.f. & Thomson
- Chrysosplenium tosaense (Makino) Makino ex Sutô
- Chrysosplenium trichospermum Edgew. ex Hook.f. & Thomson
- Chrysosplenium tetrandrum (N.Lund) Th.Fr. – northern golden saxifrage
- Chrysosplenium uniflorum Maxim.
- Chrysosplenium valdivicum Hook.
- Chrysosplenium woroschilovii Netsaeva
- Chrysosplenium wrightii Franch. & Sav. – Wright's golden saxifrage
- Chrysosplenium wuwenchenii Z.P.Jien
- Chrysosplenium zhangjiajieense X.L.Yu, Hui Zhou & D.S.Zhou
- Chrysosplenium zhouzhiense Hong Liu

== Culinary uses ==
The leaves and stems of golden saxifrage (C. alternifolium and C. oppositifolium) can be eaten in salads or as cooked greens.
