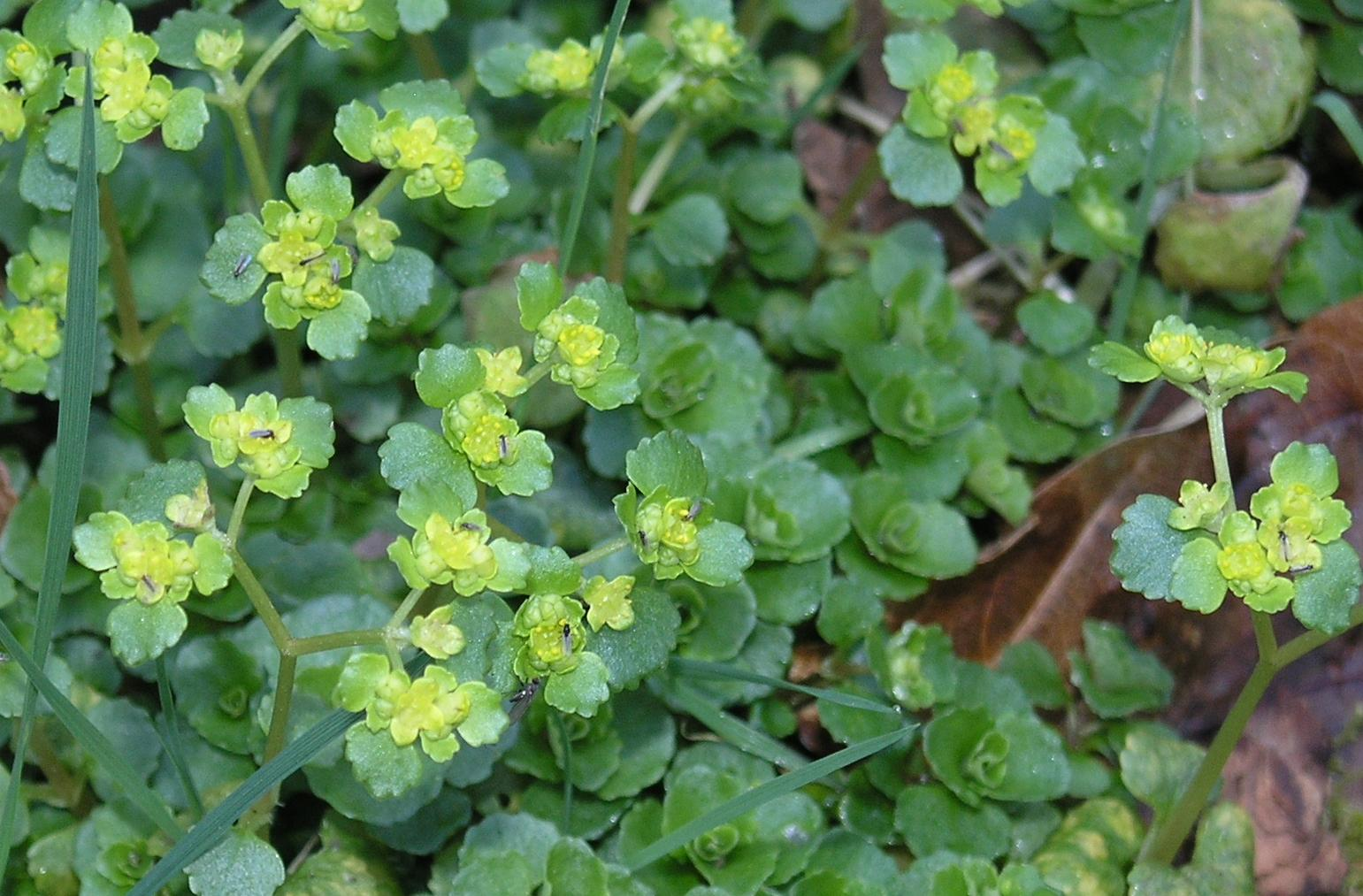

Scientific classification
- Kingdom: Plantae
- Clade: Tracheophytes
- Clade: Angiosperms
- Clade: Eudicots
- Order: Saxifragales
- Family: Saxifragaceae
- Genus: Chrysosplenium
- Species: C. oppositifolium

Binomial name
- Chrysosplenium oppositifolium L.

Synonyms
- Chrysosplenium auriculatum Crantz; Chrysosplenium octandrum Caque ex Steud.; Chrysosplenium repens Link ex Steud.; Saxifraga aurea Garsault

= Chrysosplenium oppositifolium =

Species of flowering plant

Chrysosplenium oppositifolium, the opposite-leaved golden-saxifrage, is a species of flowering plant in the family Saxifragaceae.

== Description ==
Chrysosplenium oppositifolium is a small, slightly hairy, creeping plant, with square stems. The leaves grow in opposite pairs, are rounded or oblong in shape and have blunt teeth. The tiny flowers grow between 3 and 4 mm, and are surrounded by bright yellow-green leafy bracts.

It flowers from March to July.

== Distribution and habitat ==
This plant is native to Europe (Belgium, Czechoslovakia, Denmark, France, Germany, Great Britain, Ireland, Italy, Netherlands, Norway, Poland, Portugal, Spain, Sweden, Switzerland and former Yugoslavia). It was first described by Carl Linnaeus in 1753. The plant can tolerate low light levels down to 24 lux.

The plant prefers to grow in damp, shady places, often by streamsides or in damp woodland.

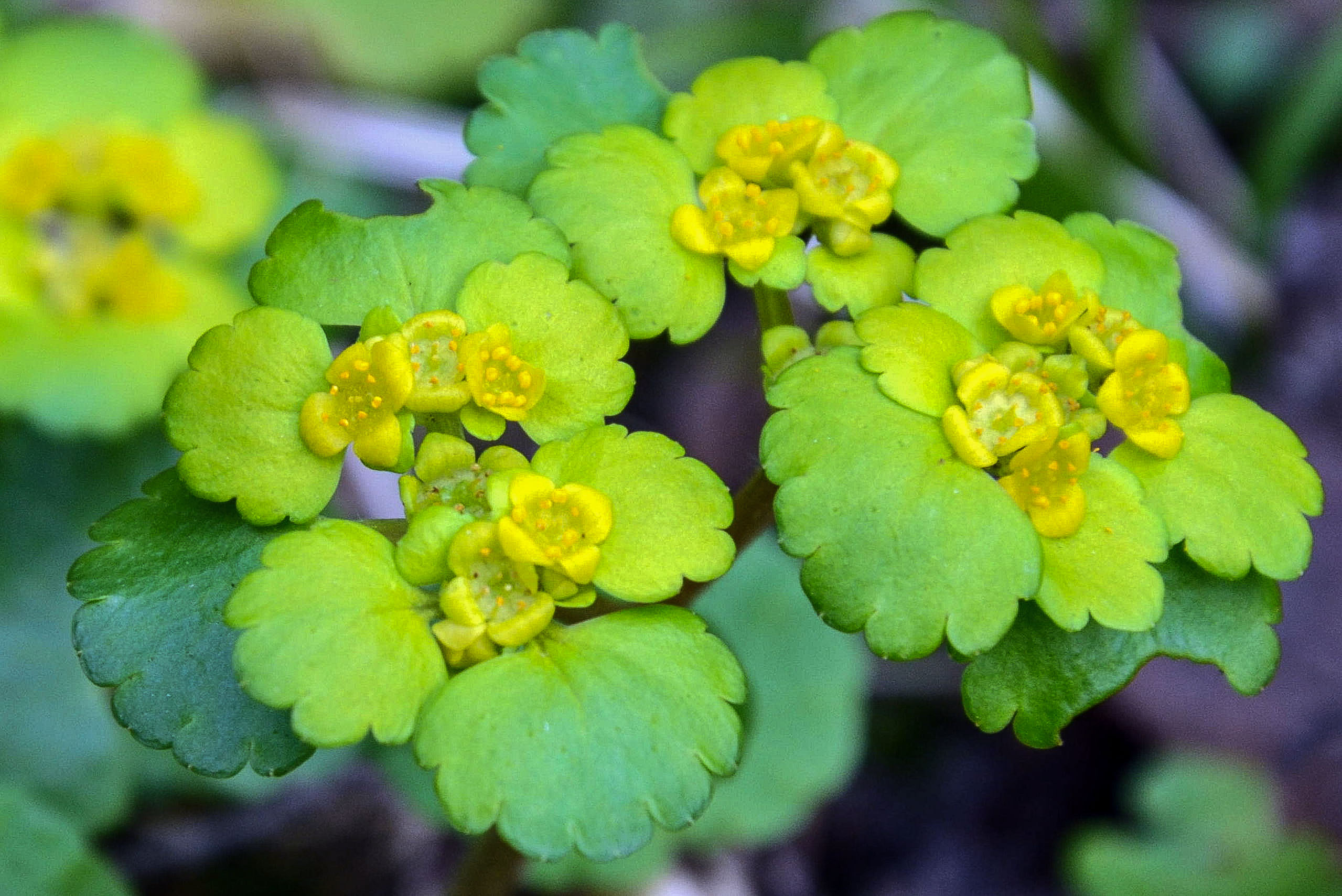
Flowers
