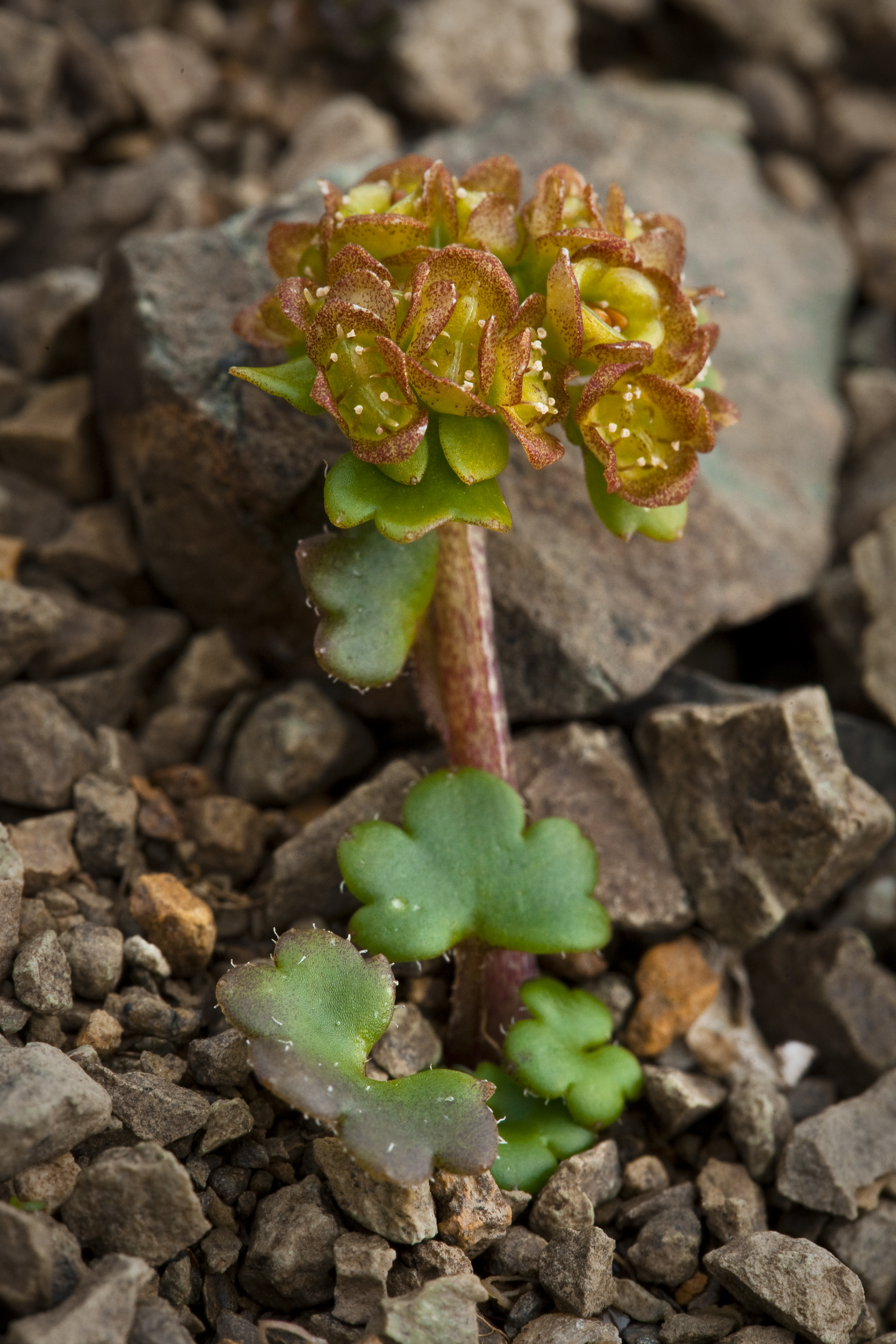

Conservation status
- Secure (NatureServe)

Scientific classification
- Kingdom: Plantae
- Clade: Tracheophytes
- Clade: Angiosperms
- Clade: Eudicots
- Order: Saxifragales
- Family: Saxifragaceae
- Genus: Chrysosplenium
- Species: C. wrightii

Binomial name
- Chrysosplenium wrightii Franch. & Sav.

Synonyms
- Chrysosplenium alternifolium var. wrightii (Franch. & Sav.) Sutô

= Chrysosplenium wrightii =

Species of flowering plant

Chrysosplenium wrightii, or Wright's golden saxifrage, is a plant species native to northwestern North America and northeastern Asia. It grows on tundra and along stream banks at elevations up to 2,300 m (7,550 ft) in British Columbia, Yukon, Alaska, the Kamchatka Peninsula in Russia, and in eastern Siberia. The plant was first described in 1878 as being from Japan. This was based on material collected along the Sea of Okhotsk presumably either Sakhalin Island or one of the Kuril Islands, parts of Japan at the time but now in the Russian Federation.

Two infraspecific taxa have been proposed, both names accepted by World Flora Online:

- Chrysosplenium wrightii subsp. wrightii
- Chrysosplenium wrightii subsp. saxatile (Khokhr.) Vorosch., from Russia

Additionally;

- Chrysosplenium wrightii var. beringanum (Rose) H.Hara, from St. Paul Island in Alaska is now included with the nominate subspecies.

Chrysosplenium wrightii is an herb reproducing by means of stolons running along the surface of the ground. Flowering stalks are up to 16 cm (6.3 in) tall, bearing a cyme of up to 30 flowers. Flowers are yellow, purple, or orange, usually with purple spots.
