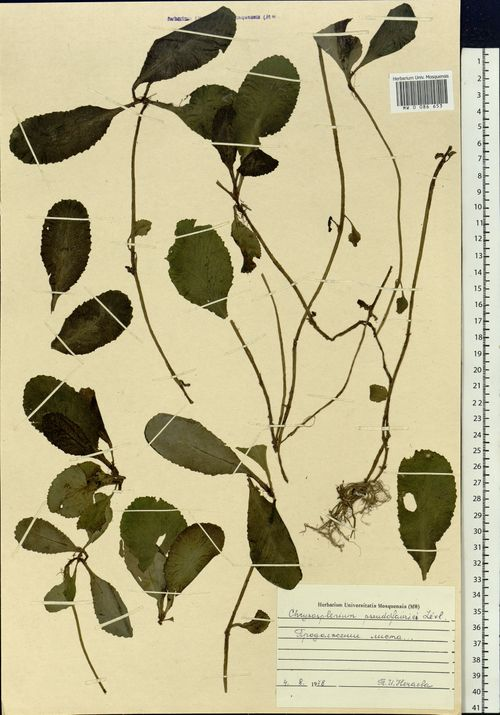
- MW0086653

Scientific classification
- Kingdom: Plantae
- Clade: Tracheophytes
- Clade: Angiosperms
- Clade: Eudicots
- Order: Saxifragales
- Family: Saxifragaceae
- Genus: Chrysosplenium
- Species: C. sinicum

Binomial name
- Chrysosplenium sinicum Maxim.

Synonyms
- Chrysosplenium chamaedryoides Engl. ex Diels; Chrysosplenium chingii H.Hara; Chrysosplenium lushanense W.T.Wang; Chrysosplenium pseudofauriei H.Lév. Chrysosplenium pseudofauriei var. nipponense Wakab. Chrysosplenium sinicum var. pseudofauriei (H.Lév.) Kitag. Chrysosplenium trachyspermum Maxim.

= Chrysosplenium sinicum =

Species of flowering plant

Chrysosplenium sinicum is a species of flowering plant in the saxifrage family. It was first described by Karl Maximovich in 1877.

It is a perennial species, and the fruit is a capsule.

== Distribution and habitat ==
It is found in far-east Russia, Mongolia, Manchuria, Korea, Japan and China, growing in humid forests in mountain valleys.
