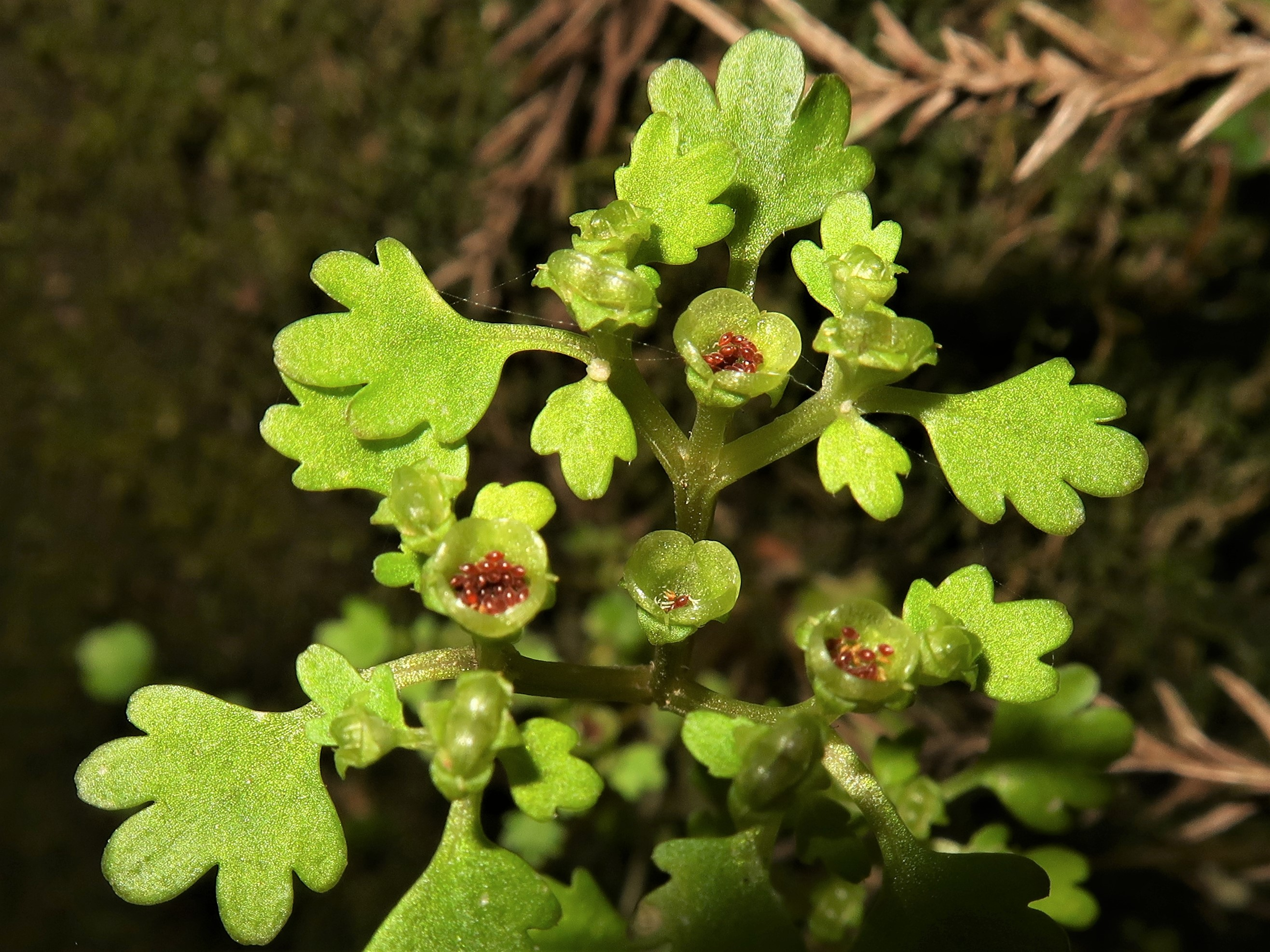

Scientific classification
- Kingdom: Plantae
- Clade: Tracheophytes
- Clade: Angiosperms
- Clade: Eudicots
- Order: Saxifragales
- Family: Saxifragaceae
- Genus: Chrysosplenium
- Species: C. tosaense

Binomial name
- Chrysosplenium tosaense (Makino) Makino ex Sutô

Synonyms
- Chrysosplenium flagelliferum var. tosaense

= Chrysosplenium tosaense =

Species of flowering plant

Chrysosplenium tosaense (タチネコノメソウ, Tachinekonomesō) is a species of flowering plant in the family Saxifragaceae that is endemic to Japan.

== Taxonomy ==
The species was first described, as Chrysosplenium flagelliferum var. tosaense, by Japanese botanist Makino Tomitarō in 1901 (his 1892 mention of Chrysosplenium tosaense is a nomen nudum). In 1935, Sutō Chiharu elevated the variety to species rank. The specific epithet relates to the type locality, Nanokawa in Kōchi Prefecture (formerly Tosa Province).

== Description ==
Chrysosplenium tosaense grows to a height of 5–17 centimetres (2.0–6.7 in) and flowers from April to May.

== Distribution ==
Chrysosplenium tosaense is endemic to Japan, where it occurs from the Kantō region to the Chūgoku region of Honshū, Shikoku, and Kyūshū.
