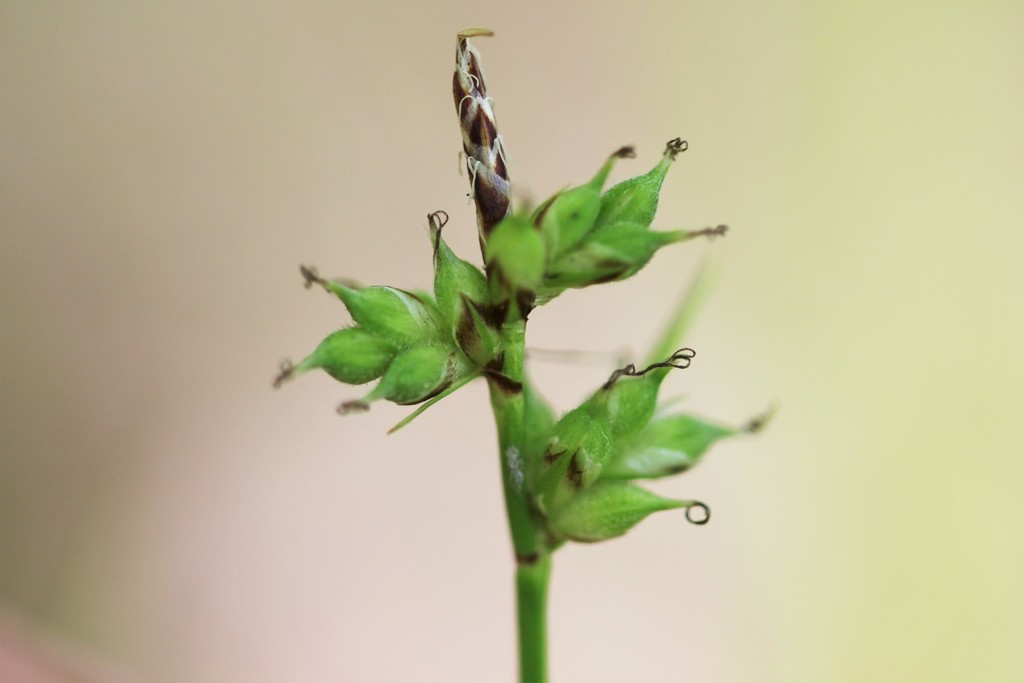

Scientific classification
- Kingdom: Plantae
- Clade: Embryophytes
- Clade: Tracheophytes
- Clade: Spermatophytes
- Clade: Angiosperms
- Clade: Monocots
- Clade: Commelinids
- Order: Poales
- Family: Cyperaceae
- Genus: Carex
- Species: C. peckii

Binomial name
- Carex peckii Howe

= Carex peckii =

Species of grass-like plant

Carex peckii, Peck's sedge, Peck's oak sedge, or white-tinged sedge, is a species of sedge native to Canada and the United States.

== Description ==
Carex peckii grows in loose clumps, spreading by rhizomes to create colonies.

== Range ==
Carex peckii is native to north-eastern, central and northern North America.

== Habitat ==
Carex peckii grows in association with trees. It is found in dry to wet sites.

== Ecology ==
Carex peckii has been identified as a host of the rust fungi Uromyces perigynius.

== Etymology ==
The specific name 'peckii' commemorates Charles Horton Peck (1833-1917), an American mycologist.

== Taxonomy ==
The name Carex peckii was first published in the annual Report of the Regents of the University of the State of New York on the New York State Museum. Albany, NY, 47: 166 in 1894 in the report of the state botanist for the year 1893 written by Charles H. Peck. The species is included in the list of additions to the herbarium of species not previously described. The species was described by Elliot C. Howe with additional specimens collected by Chester Dewey and Peter D. Knieskern. The type locality of this species is identified as New York. Carex peckii belongs to Carex sect. Acrocystis.
