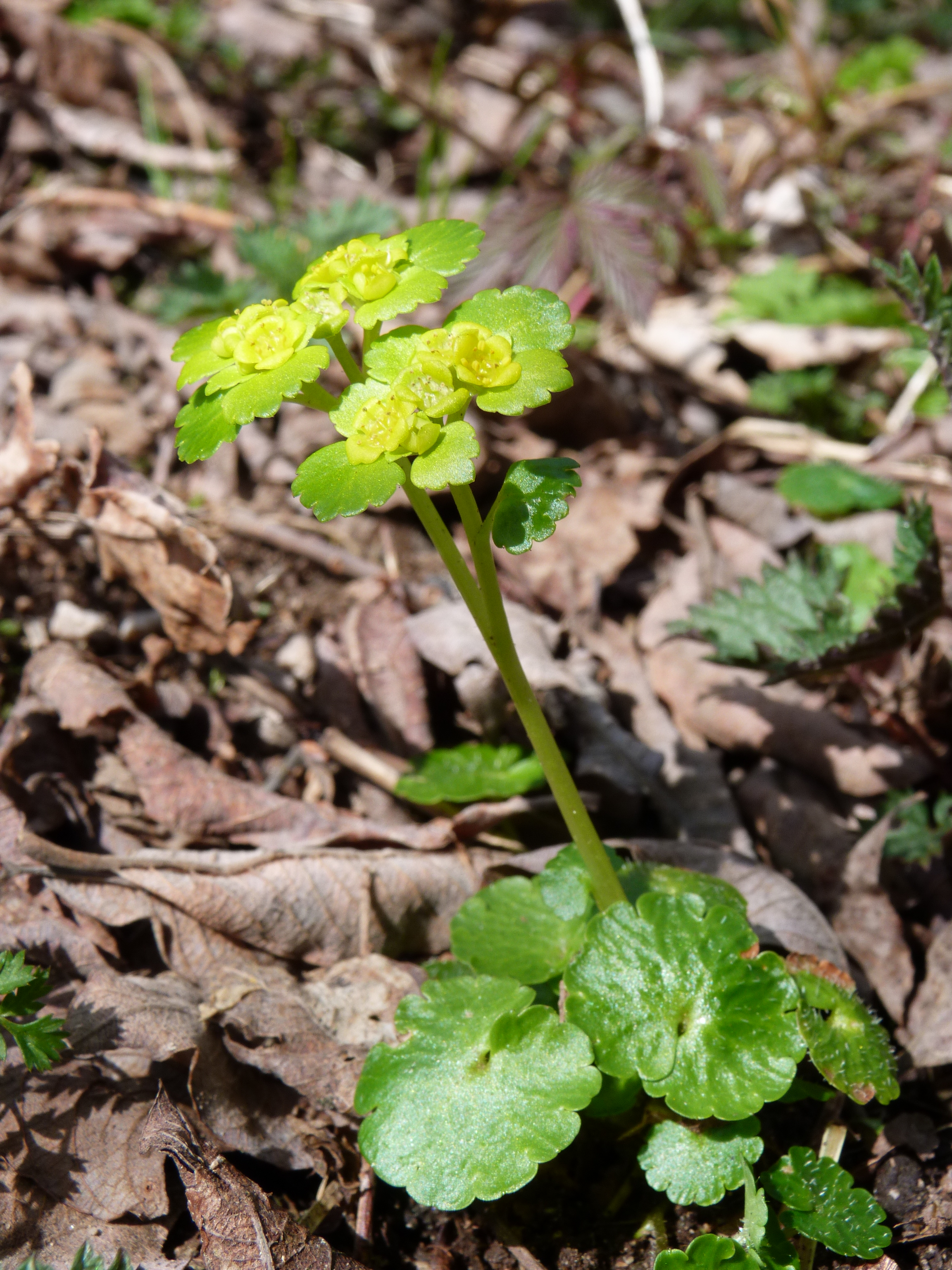

Scientific classification
- Kingdom: Plantae
- Clade: Tracheophytes
- Clade: Angiosperms
- Clade: Eudicots
- Order: Saxifragales
- Family: Saxifragaceae
- Genus: Chrysosplenium
- Species: C. alternifolium

Binomial name
- Chrysosplenium alternifolium L.

= Chrysosplenium alternifolium =

Species of flowering plant

Chrysosplenium alternifolium is a species of flowering plant in the saxifrage family known as the alternate-leaved golden-saxifrage. It is a mat-forming perennial of wet places that grows between 5 and 15 cm (2 and 6 in) tall. It blooms from March onward.

== Description ==
Alternate-leaved golden-saxifrage is a perennial, mat-forming plant with trailing stems growing to a height of 5 to 15 cm (2 to 6 in). The fragile three-sided stems are hairy on the lower parts of the plant but smooth above. The alternately arranged leaves are stalked, broad and kidney-shaped with a few rounded shallow teeth and a few hairs. The flowers are surrounded by yellowish-green bracts and have down-turned yellowish-green sepals but no petals. The central flower in the corymb has five lobes and the others four lobes. There are eight stamens and two styles which are fused at the base. The fruit is a bowl-shaped lidded capsule. This plant flowers from April to June.

== Distribution and habitat ==
Alternate-leaved golden-saxifrage is distributed across much of the cooler and wetter parts of Europe. Its natural habitat is streamsides, ditch verges, bogs, woodland seeps, waterside meadows and other wet places. It flowers very early in the year while woodland is relatively unshaded and before leaves have appeared on the trees. Raindrops striking the lids of the seed capsules cause them to be knocked off and the seed dispersed with the water splashes.

== Status ==
This plant is in decline through a large part of its range because of the decrease of suitable wetland habitat. In France, it is protected in the regions of Île-de-France, Picardie, Provence-Alpes-Côte d'Azur, Nord-Pas-de-Calais, Limousin and in the central region Centre.
