= List of endangered and threatened animals and plants of Illinois =

The Illinois List of Endangered and Threatened Species is reviewed about every five years by the Illinois Endangered Species Protection Board (ESPB). To date it has evaluated only plants and animals of the US state of Illinois, not fungi, algae, or other forms of life; species that occur in Illinois which are listed as endangered or threatened by the U.S. federal government under the Endangered Species Act of 1973 are automatically listed as such for the state of Illinois.

== Illinois Endangered Species Protection Board ==
The Illinois Endangered Species Protection Act created the ESPB in 1972. The board is made up of six naturalists including at least one botanist, two zoologists, and two ecologists. Board members are volunteers, and as of 2019 include Jeff Walk of The Nature Conservancy, ichthyologist Philip Willink, Joyce Hofmann (chair), Janice Coons (vice-chair), Tracy Evans (secretary), ornithologist Angelo P. Capparella, Bruce Ross-Shannon, Jeremie Fant, Randy Schietzelt, Chris Young from the Illinois Department of Natural Resources (non-voting member), and one vacancy. They met most recently in 2019 and penultimately in 2014.

== Recovery plans ==
Only twenty species ever listed have had Illinois Endangered and Threatened Species Recovery Plans approved by the board, but other parties may implement recovery plans without board approval. Examples of plans implemented by other parties include that for Hine's emerald dragonfly (Somatochlora hineana) headed by the United States Fish and Wildlife Service and Blanding's turtle (Emydoidea blandingii) headed by the Forest Preserve District of DuPage County. Species with approved recovery plans are: eryngium stem borer (Papaipema eryngii), golden mouse (Ochrotomys nuttalli), American snowbell (Styrax americana), bald eagle (Haliaeetus leucocephalus), American barn owl (Tyto furcata), beardtongue (Penstemon tubaeflorus), bloodleaf (Iresine rhizomatosa), creeping St. Johnwort (Hypericum adpressum), eastern woodrat (Neotoma floridana), greater prairie-chicken (Tympanuchus cupido), halberd leaf tearthumb (Polygonum arifolium/Tracaulon arifolium), leatherflower (Clematis viorna), marsh rice rat (Oryzomys palustris), mud-plantain (Heteranthera reniformis), northern harrier (Circus cyaneus), osprey (Pandion haliaetus), peregrine falcon (Falco peregrinus), road-winged sedge (Carex alata), royal catchfly (Silene regia), and short-eared owl (Asio flammeus).

== List of species ==
Scientific name	Vernacular name	Illinois status (2020)	Illinois status (2015)	Federal status	Group	Subgroup	Image
Gastrophryne carolinensis	Eastern narrow-mouthed toad	threatened	threatened		amphibians	frogs and toads	
Hyla avivoca	Bird-voiced treefrog	threatened	threatened		amphibians	frogs and toads	
Pseudacris illinoensis	Illinois chorus frog	threatened	threatened		amphibians	frogs and toads	
Ambystoma platineum	Silvery salamander	endangered	endangered		amphibians	salamanders	
Cryptobranchus alleganiensis	Hellbender	endangered	endangered		amphibians	salamanders	
Desmognathus conanti	Spotted dusky salamander	endangered	endangered		amphibians	salamanders	
Ambystoma jeffersonianum	Jefferson salamander	threatened	threatened		amphibians	salamanders	
Hemidactylium scutatum	Four-toed salamander	threatened	threatened		amphibians	salamanders	
Necturus maculosus	Mudpuppy	threatened	threatened		amphibians	salamanders	
Asio flammeus	Short-eared owl	endangered	endangered		birds		
Bartramia longicauda	Upland sandpiper	endangered	endangered		birds		
Botaurus lentiginosus	American bittern	endangered	endangered		birds		
Buteo swainsoni	Swainson's hawk	endangered	endangered		birds		
Charadrius melodus	Piping plover	endangered	endangered	endangered	birds		
Chlidonias niger	Black tern	endangered	endangered		birds		
Circus hudsonius	Northern harrier	endangered	endangered		birds		
Egretta caerulea	Little blue heron	endangered	endangered		birds		
Egretta thula	Snowy egret	endangered	endangered		birds		
Gallinula galeata	Common gallinule	endangered	endangered		birds		
Lanius ludovicianus	Loggerhead shrike	endangered	endangered		birds		
Laterallus jamaicensis	Black rail	endangered	endangered		birds		
Limnothlypis swainsonii	Swainson's warbler	endangered	endangered		birds		
Nyctanassa violacea	Yellow-crowned night-heron	endangered	endangered		birds		
Nycticorax nycticorax	Black-crowned night-heron	endangered	endangered		birds		
Phalaropus tricolor	Wilson's phalarope	endangered	endangered		birds		
Rallus elegans	King rail	endangered	endangered		birds		
Sterna forsteri	Forster's tern	endangered	endangered		birds		
Sterna hirundo	Common tern	endangered	endangered		birds		
Sternula antillarum	Least tern	endangered	endangered	endangered	birds		
Thryomanes bewickii	Bewick's wren	endangered	endangered		birds		
Tympanuchus cupido	Greater prairie-chicken	endangered	endangered		birds		
Xanthocephalus xanthocephalus	Yellow-headed blackbird	endangered	endangered		birds		
Ictinia mississippiensis	Mississippi kite	removed from threatened	threatened		birds		
Tyto furcata	American Barn owl	removed from threatened	threatened		birds		
Antrostomus carolinensis	Chuck-will's-widow	threatened	threatened		birds		
Calidris canutus rufa	Rufa red knot	threatened	threatened	threatened	birds		
Coccyzus erythropthalmus	Black-billed cuckoo	threatened	threatened		birds		
Ixobrychus exilis	Least bittern	threatened	threatened		birds		
Pandion haliaetus	Osprey	threatened	endangered		birds		
Setophaga cerulea	Cerulean warbler	threatened	threatened		birds		
Acipenser fulvescens	Lake sturgeon	endangered	endangered		fishes		
Ammocrypta clara	Western sand darter	endangered	endangered		fishes		
Coregonus artedi	Cisco	endangered	threatened		fishes		
Crystallaria asprella	Crystal darter	endangered	threatened		fishes		
Etheostoma camurum	Bluebreast darter	endangered	endangered		fishes		
Etheostoma histrio	Harlequin darter	endangered	endangered		fishes		
Hybognathus hayi	Cypress minnow	endangered	endangered		fishes		
Hybopsis amnis	Pallid shiner	endangered	endangered		fishes		
Ichthyomyzon fossor	Northern brook lamprey	endangered	endangered		fishes		
Macrhybopsis gelida	Sturgeon chub	endangered	endangered		fishes		
Moxostoma valenciennesi	Greater redhorse	endangered	endangered		fishes		
Nocomis micropogon	River chub	endangered	endangered		fishes		
Notropis anogenus	Pugnose shiner	endangered	endangered		fishes		
Notropis boops	Bigeye shiner	endangered	endangered		fishes		
Notropis heterolepis	Blacknose shiner	endangered	endangered		fishes		
Notropis maculatus	Taillight shiner	endangered	endangered		fishes		
Notropis texanus	Weed shiner	endangered	endangered		fishes		
Noturus stigmosus	Northern madtom	endangered	endangered		fishes		
Scaphirhynchus albus	Pallid sturgeon	endangered	endangered	endangered	fishes		
Anguilla rostrata	American eel	removed from threatened	threatened		fishes		
Etheostoma exile	Iowa darter	removed from threatened	threatened		fishes		
Ammocrypta pellucida	Eastern sand darter	threatened	threatened		fishes		
Catostomus catostomus	Longnose sucker	threatened	threatened		fishes		
Cottus bairdii	Mottled sculpin	threatened			fishes		
Erimystax x-punctatus	Gravel chub	threatened	threatened		fishes		
Forbesichthys agassizii	Spring cavefish	threatened			fishes		
Fundulus diaphanus subsp. menona	Western banded killifish	threatened	threatened		fishes		
Fundulus dispar	Starhead topminnow	threatened	threatened		fishes		
Hybognathus hankinsoni	Brassy minnow	threatened	threatened		fishes		
Hybopsis amblops	Bigeye chub	threatened	endangered		fishes		
Lampetra aepyptera	Least brook lamprey	threatened	threatened		fishes		
Lepomis miniatus	Redspotted sunfish	threatened	endangered		fishes		
Lepomis symmetricus	Bantam sunfish	threatened	threatened		fishes		
Lethenteron appendix	American brook lamprey	threatened	threatened		fishes		
Moxostoma carinatum	River redhorse	threatened	threatened		fishes		
Notropis chalybaeus	Ironcolor shiner	threatened	threatened		fishes		
Notropis heterodon	Blackchin shiner	threatened	threatened		fishes		
Notropis nubilus	Ozark minnow	threatened			fishes		
Bombus affinis	Rusty patched bumble bee	endangered		endangered	invertebrates	bees	
Calephelis muticum	Swamp metalmark	endangered	endangered		invertebrates	butterflies and moths	
Hesperia metea	Cobweb skipper	endangered	endangered		invertebrates	butterflies and moths	
Hesperia ottoe	Ottoe skipper	endangered	endangered		invertebrates	butterflies and moths	
Incisalia polios	Hoary elfin	endangered	endangered		invertebrates	butterflies and moths	
Papaipema eryngii	Eryngium stem borer	threatened	threatened		invertebrates	butterflies and moths	
Plebejus melissa samuelis	Karner blue butterfly	endangered	endangered	endangered	invertebrates	butterflies and moths	
Speyeria idalia	Regal fritillary	threatened	threatened		invertebrates	butterflies and moths	
Caecidotea lesliei	Isopod	endangered	endangered		invertebrates	crustaceans	
Crangonyx anomalus	Anomalous spring amphipod	endangered	endangered		invertebrates	crustaceans	
Crangonyx packardi	Packard's cave amphipod	endangered	endangered		invertebrates	crustaceans	
Faxonius indianensis	Indiana crayfish	endangered	endangered		invertebrates	crustaceans	
Faxonius kentuckiensis	Kentucky crayfish	endangered	endangered		invertebrates	crustaceans	
Faxonius lancifer	Shrimp crayfish	endangered	endangered		invertebrates	crustaceans	
Faxonius placidus	Bigclaw crayfish	endangered	endangered		invertebrates	crustaceans	
Gammarus acherondytes	Illinois cave amphipod	endangered	endangered	endangered	invertebrates	crustaceans	
Stygobromus iowae	Iowa amphipod	endangered	endangered		invertebrates	crustaceans	
Nannothemis bella	Elfin skimmer	endangered	threatened		invertebrates	dragonflies	
Somatochlora hineana	Hine's emerald dragonfly	endangered	endangered	endangered	invertebrates	dragonflies	
Athysanella incongrua	Leafhopper	endangered	endangered		invertebrates	leafhoppers	
Aflexia rubranura	Redveined prairie leafhopper	threatened	threatened		invertebrates	leafhoppers	
Cyprogenia stegaria	Fanshell	endangered	endangered	endangered	invertebrates	mussels	
Elliptio crassidens	Elephant-ear	endangered	endangered		invertebrates	mussels	
Epioblasma rangiana	Northern riffleshell	endangered	endangered	endangered	invertebrates	mussels	
Epioblasma triquetra	Snuffbox	endangered	endangered	endangered	invertebrates	mussels	
Eurynia dilatata	Spike	endangered	threatened		invertebrates	mussels	
Lampsilis abrupta	Pink mucket	endangered	endangered	endangered	invertebrates	mussels	
Lampsilis fasciola	Wavy-rayed lampmussel	endangered	endangered		invertebrates	mussels	
Lampsilis higginsii	Higgins eye	endangered	endangered	endangered	invertebrates	mussels	
Leptodea leptodon	Scaleshell	endangered	endangered	endangered	invertebrates	mussels	
Margaritifera monodonta	Spectaclecase	endangered	endangered	endangered	invertebrates	mussels	
Plethobasus cooperianus	Orangefoot pimpleback	endangered	endangered	endangered	invertebrates	mussels	
Plethobasus cyphyus	Sheepnose	endangered	endangered	endangered	invertebrates	mussels	
Pleurobema clava	Clubshell	endangered	endangered	endangered	invertebrates	mussels	
Pleurobema cordatum	Ohio pigtoe	endangered	endangered		invertebrates	mussels	
Potamilus capax	Fat pocketbook	endangered	endangered	endangered	invertebrates	mussels	
Ptychobranchus fasciolaris	Kidneyshell	endangered	endangered		invertebrates	mussels	
Reginaia ebenus	Ebonyshell	endangered	endangered		invertebrates	mussels	
Simpsonaias ambigua	Salamander mussel	endangered	endangered		invertebrates	mussels	
Theliderma cylindrica	Rabbitsfoot	endangered	endangered	threatened	invertebrates	mussels	
Toxolasma lividum	Purple lilliput	endangered	endangered		invertebrates	mussels	
Villosa iris	Rainbow mussel	endangered	endangered		invertebrates	mussels	
Alasmidonta viridis	Slippershell	removed from threatened	threatened		invertebrates	mussels	
Ligumia recta	Black sandshell	removed from threatened	threatened		invertebrates	mussels	
Villosa lienosa	Little spectaclecase	removed from threatened	threatened		invertebrates	mussels	
Cyclonaias tuberculata	Purple wartyback	threatened	threatened		invertebrates	mussels	
Ellipsaria lineolata	Butterfly mussel	threatened	threatened		invertebrates	mussels	
Quadrula metanevra	Monkeyface	threatened			invertebrates	mussels	
Centruroides vittatus	Common striped scorpion	endangered	endangered		invertebrates	scorpions	
Discus macclintocki	Iowa Pleistocene snail	endangered	endangered	endangered	invertebrates	snails	
Fontigens antroecetes	Hydrobiid Cave snail	endangered	endangered		invertebrates	snails	
Leptoxis praerosa	Onyx rocksnail	endangered	endangered		invertebrates	snails	
Lithasia obovata	Shawnee rocksnail	endangered	endangered		invertebrates	snails	
Pygmarrhopalites madonnensis	Madonna Cave springtail	endangered	endangered		invertebrates	springtails	
Diploperla robusta	Robust springfly	endangered	endangered		invertebrates	stoneflies	
Prostoia ozarkensis	Central forestfly	endangered	endangered		invertebrates	stoneflies	
Canis lupus	Gray/timber wolf	endangered	threatened	endangered	mammals		
Corynorhinus rafinesquii	Rafinesque's big-eared bat	endangered	endangered		mammals		
Myotis austroriparius	Southeastern myotis	endangered	endangered		mammals		
Myotis grisescens	Gray bat	endangered	endangered	endangered	mammals		
Myotis sodalis	Indiana bat	endangered	endangered	endangered	mammals		
Neotoma floridana	Eastern wood rat	removed from endangered	endangered		mammals		
Myotis leibii	Eastern small-footed bat	threatened	threatened		mammals		
Myotis septentrionalis	Northern long-eared bat	threatened	threatened	threatened	mammals		
Poliocitellus franklinii	Franklin's ground squirrel	threatened	threatened		mammals		
Actaea podocarpa	American bugbane	endangered	endangered		plants		
Actaea racemosa	False bugbane	endangered	endangered		plants		
Actaea rubifolia	Black cohosh	endangered	endangered		plants		
Adoxa moschatellina	Moschatel	endangered	endangered		plants		
Alnus incana subsp. rugosa	Speckled alder	endangered	endangered		plants		
Amelanchier sanguinea	Shadbush	endangered	endangered		plants		
Amorpha nitens	Smooth false indigo	endangered	endangered		plants		
Andromeda glaucophylla	Bog rosemary	endangered	endangered		plants		
Arctostaphylos uva-ursi	Bearberry	endangered	endangered		plants		
Artemisia dracunculus	Dragon wormwood	endangered	endangered		plants		
Asclepias lanuginosa	Wooly milkweed	endangered	endangered		plants		
Asclepias meadii	Mead's milkweed	endangered	endangered	threatened	plants		
Asclepias ovalifolia	Oval milkweed	endangered	endangered		plants		
Asclepias stenophylla	Narrow-leaved green milkweed	endangered	endangered		plants		
Asplenium bradleyi	Bradley's spleenwort	endangered	endangered		plants		
Asplenium resiliens	Black spleenwort	endangered	endangered		plants		
Astragalus crassicarpus var. trichocalyx	Large ground plum	endangered	endangered		plants		
Astragalus distortus	Bent milk vetch	endangered	endangered		plants		
Astragalus tennesseensis	Tennessee milk vetch	endangered	endangered		plants		
Avenella flexuosa	Hairgrass	endangered	endangered		plants		
Baptisia tinctoria	Yellow wild indigo	endangered	endangered		plants		
Bartonia paniculata	Screwstem	endangered	endangered		plants		
Beckmannia syzigachne	American slough grass	endangered	endangered		plants		
Berchemia scandens	Supple-jack	endangered	endangered		plants		
Betula alleghaniensis	Yellow birch	endangered	endangered		plants		
Botrychium campestre	Prairie moonwort	endangered	endangered		plants		
Botrychium matricariifolium	Daisyleaf grape fern	endangered	endangered		plants		
Botrychium multifidum	Northern grape fern	endangered	endangered		plants		
Botrychium simplex	Dwarf grape fern	endangered	endangered		plants		
Bouteloua gracilis	Blue grama	endangered	endangered		plants		
Bumelia lanuginosa	Wooly buckthorn	endangered	endangered		plants		
Calamagrostis insperata	Hollow reed grass	endangered	endangered		plants		
Calla palustris	Water arum	endangered	endangered		plants		
Calopogon oklahomensis	Oklahoma grass pink orchid	endangered	endangered		plants		
Calopogon tuberosus	Grass pink orchid	endangered	endangered		plants		
Camassia angusta	Wild hyacinth	endangered	endangered		plants		
Cardamine pratensis var. palustris	Cuckoo flower	endangered	endangered		plants		
Carex alata	Winged sedge	endangered	endangered		plants		
Carex arkansana	Arkansas sedge	endangered	endangered		plants		
Carex brunnescens	Brownish sedge	endangered	endangered		plants		
Carex canescens	Silvery sedge	endangered	endangered		plants		
Carex chordorrhiza	Cordroot sedge	endangered	endangered		plants		
Carex crawfordii	Crawford's sedge	endangered	endangered		plants		
Carex cumulata	Sedge	endangered	endangered		plants		
Carex debilis	White-edge sedge	endangered			plants		
Carex decomposita	Cypress-knee sedge	endangered	endangered		plants		
Carex diandra	Sedge	endangered	endangered		plants		
Carex disperma	Shortleaf sedge	endangered	endangered		plants		
Carex echinata	Sedge	endangered	endangered		plants		
Carex formosa	Sedge	endangered	endangered		plants		
Carex garberi	Elk sedge	endangered	endangered		plants		
Carex gigantea	Large sedge	endangered	endangered		plants		
Carex heliophila	Plains sedge	endangered	endangered		plants		
Carex intumescens	Swollen sedge	endangered	endangered		plants		
Carex nigromarginata	Black-edged sedge	endangered	endangered		plants		
Carex oligosperma	Few-seeded sedge	endangered	endangered		plants		
Carex opaca	Opaque oval sedge	endangered			plants		
Carex physorhyncha	Bellow's beak sedge	endangered	endangered		plants		
Carex plantaginea	Plaintain-leaved sedge	endangered	endangered		plants		
Carex reniformis	Reniform sedge	endangered	endangered		plants		
Carex straminea	Eastern Straw sedge	endangered			plants		
Carex trisperma	Three-seeded sedge	endangered	endangered		plants		
Carex tuckermanii	Tuckerman's sedge	endangered	endangered		plants		
Carya pallida	Pale hickory	endangered	endangered		plants		
Castilleja sessiliflora	Downy yellow painted cup	endangered	endangered		plants		
Ceanothus herbaceus	Redroot	endangered	endangered		plants		
Chamaelirium luteum	Fairy wand	endangered	endangered		plants		
Chamaesyce polygonifolia	Seaside spurge	endangered	endangered		plants		
Chimaphila maculata	Spotted wintergreen	endangered	endangered		plants		
Chimaphila umbellata	Pipsissewa	endangered	endangered		plants		
Circaea alpina	Small enchanter's nightshade	endangered	endangered		plants		
Cirsium pitcheri	Pitcher's (dune) thistle	endangered	threatened	threatened	plants		
Cladrastis lutea	Yellowwood	endangered	endangered		plants		
Clematis crispa	Blue jasmine	endangered	endangered		plants		
Clematis viorna	Leatherflower	endangered	endangered		plants		
Collinsia violacea	Violet collinsia	endangered	endangered		plants		
Comptonia peregrina	Sweetfern	endangered	endangered		plants		
Conioselinum chinense	Hemlock parsley	endangered	endangered		plants		
Corallorhiza maculata	Spotted coral-root orchid	endangered	endangered		plants		
Cornus canadensis	Bunchberry	endangered	endangered		plants		
Corydalis aurea	Golden corydalis	endangered	endangered		plants		
Corydalis halei	Hale's corydalis	endangered	endangered		plants		
Corydalis sempervirens	Pink corydalis	endangered	endangered		plants		
Cynosciadium digitatum	Cynosciadium	endangered	endangered		plants		
Cypripedium acaule	Moccasin flower	endangered	endangered		plants		
Cypripedium parviflorum	Small yellow lady's slipper	endangered	endangered		plants		
Cypripedium reginae	Showy lady's slipper	endangered	endangered		plants		
Cystopteris laurentiana	Laurentian fragile fern	endangered	endangered		plants		
Dalea foliosa	Leafy prairie clover	endangered	endangered	endangered	plants		
Delphinium carolinianum	Hill prairie larkspur/wild blue larkspur	endangered	threatened		plants		
Dendrolycopodium dendroideum	Ground pine	endangered	endangered		plants		
Dendrolycopodium hickeyi	Hickey's groundpine	endangered			plants		
Dennstaedtia punctilobula	Hay-scented fern	endangered	endangered		plants		
Dichanthelium boreale	Northern panic grass	endangered	endangered		plants		
Dichanthelium joori	Panic grass	endangered	endangered		plants		
Dichanthelium portoricense	Hemlock panic grass	endangered	endangered		plants		
Dichanthelium ravenelii	Ravenel's panic grass	endangered	endangered		plants		
Dichanthelium yadkinense	Panic grass	endangered	endangered		plants		
Draba cuneifolia	Whitlow grass	endangered	endangered		plants		
Drosera rotundifolia	Round-leaved sundew	endangered	endangered		plants		
Dryopteris celsa	Log fern	endangered	endangered		plants		
Echinodorus tenellus	Small burhead	endangered	endangered		plants		
Eleocharis olivacea	Capitate spikerush	endangered	endangered		plants		
Eleocharis pauciflora	Few-flowered spikerush	endangered	endangered		plants		
Elymus trachycaulus	Bearded wheat grass	endangered	endangered		plants		
Equisetum scirpoides	Dwarf scouring rush	endangered	endangered		plants		
Equisetum sylvaticum	Woodland horsetail	endangered	endangered		plants		
Eriophorum virginicum	Rusty cotton grass	endangered	endangered		plants		
Eryngium prostratum	Eryngo	endangered	endangered		plants		
Eupatorium hyssopifolium	Hyssop-leaved thoroughwort	endangered	endangered		plants		
Euphorbia spathulata	Spurge	endangered	endangered		plants		
Fimbristylis vahlii	Vahl's fimbry	endangered	endangered		plants		
Galactia mohlenbrockii	Boykin's dioclea	endangered	endangered		plants		
Galium virgatum	Dwarf bedstraw	endangered	endangered		plants		
Geranium bicknellii	Northern cranesbill	endangered	endangered		plants		
Glyceria arkansana	Arkansas mannagrass	endangered	endangered		plants		
Gratiola quartermaniae	Hedge hyssop	endangered	endangered		plants		
Gymnocarpium dryopteris	Oak fern	endangered	endangered		plants		
Gymnocarpium robertianum	Scented oak fern	endangered	endangered		plants		
Hackelia deflexa var. americana	Stickseed	endangered	endangered		plants		
Halesia carolina	Silverbell tree	endangered	endangered		plants		
Helianthus angustifolius	Narrow-leaved sunflower	endangered	threatened		plants		
Helianthus giganteus	Tall sunflower	endangered	endangered		plants		
Heliotropium tenellum	Slender heliotrope	endangered	endangered		plants		
Heteranthera reniformis	Mud plantain	endangered	endangered		plants		
Hexalectris spicata	Crested coralroot orchid	endangered	endangered		plants		
Hudsonia tomentosa	False heather	endangered	endangered		plants		
Hydrolea uniflora	One-flowered hydrolea	endangered	endangered		plants		
Hymenopappus scabiosaeus	Old plainsman	endangered	threatened		plants		
Hypericum adpressum	Shore St. John's wort	endangered	endangered		plants		
Hypericum kalmianum	Kalm's St. John's wort	endangered	endangered		plants		
Iliamna remota	Kankakee mallow	endangered	endangered		plants		
Iresine rhizomatosa	Bloodleaf	endangered	endangered		plants		
Isoetes butleri	Butler's quillwort	endangered	endangered		plants		
Isotria medeoloides	Small whorled pogonia	endangered	endangered	threatened	plants		
Isotria verticillata	Whorled pogonia	endangered	endangered		plants		
Juglans cinerea	Butternut	endangered			plants		
Juncus vaseyi	Vasey's rush	endangered	endangered		plants		
Juniperus horizontalis	Trailing juniper	endangered	endangered		plants		
Justicia ovata	Water willow	endangered	endangered		plants		
Larix laricina	Tamarack	endangered	threatened		plants		
Lechea intermedia	Savanna pinweed	endangered	endangered		plants		
Lespedeza leptostachya	Prairie bush clover	endangered	endangered	threatened	plants		
Lonicera dioica var. glaucescens	Red honeysuckle	endangered	endangered		plants		
Lonicera flava	Yellow honeysuckle	endangered	endangered		plants		
Luzula acuminata	Hairy woodrush	endangered	endangered		plants		
Lycopodiella inundata	Bog clubmoss	endangered	endangered		plants		
Lycopodium clavatum	Running pine	endangered	endangered		plants		
Lysimachia radicans	Creeping loosestrife	endangered	endangered		plants		
Malus angustifolia	Narrow-leaved crabapple	endangered	endangered		plants		
Malvastrum hispidum	False mallow	endangered	endangered		plants		
Matelea decipiens	Climbing milkweed	endangered	endangered		plants		
Medeola virginiana	Indian cucumber root	endangered	endangered		plants		
Megalodonta beckii	Water marigold	endangered	endangered		plants		
Melanthera nivea	White melanthera	endangered	endangered		plants		
Melanthium virginicum	Virginia bunchflower	endangered	threatened		plants		
Melica mutica	Two-flowered melic grass	endangered	endangered		plants		
Mentzelia oligosperma	Stickleaf	endangered	endangered		plants		
Micranthes virginiensis	Early saxifrage	endangered	endangered		plants		
Mimosa nuttallii	Cat's claw	endangered			plants		
Mimulus glabratus	Yellow monkey flower	endangered	endangered		plants		
Mirabilis hirsuta	Hairy umbrella-wort	endangered	endangered		plants		
Nemophila triloba	Baby blue-eyes	endangered	endangered		plants		
Nothocalais cuspidata	Prairie dandelion	endangered	endangered		plants		
Opuntia fragilis	Fragile prickly pear	endangered	endangered		plants		
Orobanche fasciculata	Clustered broomrape	endangered	endangered		plants		
Penstemon grandiflorus	Large-flowered beard tongue	endangered	endangered		plants		
Penstemon tubaeflorus	Tube beard tongue	endangered	endangered		plants		
Phacelia gilioides	Ozark phacelia	endangered	endangered		plants		
Phegopteris connectilis	Long beech fern	endangered	endangered		plants		
Phemeranthus calycinus	Fameflower	endangered	endangered		plants		
Phlox pilosa sangamonensis	Sangamon phlox	endangered	endangered		plants		
Physaria ludoviciana	Silvery bladderpod	endangered	endangered		plants		
Pinus banksiana	Jack pine	endangered	endangered		plants		
Pinus echinata	Shortleaf pine	endangered	endangered		plants		
Pinus resinosa	Red pine	endangered	endangered		plants		
Plantago cordata	Heart-leaved plantain	endangered	endangered		plants		
Platanthera ciliaris	Orange fringed orchid	endangered	endangered		plants		
Platanthera clavellata	Wood orchid	endangered	endangered		plants		
Platanthera leucophaea	Eastern prairie fringed orchid	endangered	endangered	threatened	plants		
Platanthera psycodes	Purple fringed orchid	endangered	endangered		plants		
Poa alsodes	Grove bluegrass	endangered	endangered		plants		
Poa languida	Weak bluegrass	endangered	endangered		plants		
Poa wolfii	Wolf's bluegrass	endangered	endangered		plants		
Pogonia ophioglossoides	Snake-mouth	endangered	endangered		plants		
Polanisia jamesii	James' clammyweed	endangered	endangered		plants		
Polygala incarnata	Pink milkwort	endangered	endangered		plants		
Polygonatum pubescens	Downy Solomon's Seal	endangered	threatened		plants		
Polygonum careyi	Carey's heartsease	endangered	endangered		plants		
Populus balsamifera	Balsam poplar	endangered	endangered		plants		
Potamogeton praelongus	White-stemmed pondweed	endangered	endangered		plants		
Potamogeton pulcher	Spotted pondweed	endangered	endangered		plants		
Potamogeton robbinsii	Fern pondweed	endangered	endangered		plants		
Potamogeton strictifolius	Stiff pondweed	endangered	endangered		plants		
Primula mistassinica	Bird's-eye primrose	endangered	endangered		plants		
Ptilimnium nuttallii	Mock bishop's weed	endangered	endangered		plants		
Quercus texana	Nuttall's oak	endangered	endangered		plants		
Ranunculus rhomboideus	Prairie buttercup	endangered	threatened		plants		
Rhamnus alnifolia	Alder buckthorn	endangered	endangered		plants		
Rhexia mariana	Dull meadow beauty	endangered	endangered		plants		
Rhynchospora alba	Beaked rush	endangered	endangered		plants		
Rhynchospora glomerata	Clustered beak rush	endangered	endangered		plants		
Ribes hirtellum	Northern gooseberry	endangered	endangered		plants		
Rosa acicularis	Bristly rose	endangered	endangered		plants		
Sabatia campestris	Prairie rose gentian	endangered	endangered		plants		
Sagittaria australis	Arrowhead	endangered	endangered		plants		
Salix serissima	Autumn willow	endangered	endangered		plants		
Salix syrticola	Dune willow	endangered	endangered		plants		
Sambucus racemosa subsp. pubens	Red-berried elder	endangered	endangered		plants		
Sanguisorba canadensis	American burnet	endangered	endangered		plants		
Sanicula smallii	Southern black snakeroot	endangered	endangered		plants		
Sarracenia purpurea	Pitcher plant	endangered	endangered		plants		
Sceptridium biternatum	Southern grape fern	endangered	endangered		plants		
Schizachne purpurascens	False melic grass	endangered	endangered		plants		
Schoenoplectus purshianus	Pursh's bulrush	endangered	endangered		plants		
Schoenoplectus smithii	Smith's bulrush	endangered	endangered		plants		
Scirpus hattorianus	Bulrush	endangered	endangered		plants		
Scirpus microcarpus	Small-fruited bulrush	endangered	endangered		plants		
Scirpus polyphyllus	Leafy bulrush	endangered	threatened		plants		
Scleria muhlenbergii	Muhlenberg's nut rush	endangered	endangered		plants		
Scleria pauciflora	Carolina whipgrass	endangered	endangered		plants		
Shepherdia canadensis	Buffaloberry	endangered	endangered		plants		
Silene ovata	Ovate catchfly	endangered	endangered		plants		
Silene regia	Royal catchfly	endangered	endangered		plants		
Sisyrinchium atlanticum	Eastern blue-eyed grass	endangered	endangered		plants		
Sisyrinchium montanum	Mountain blue-eyed grass	endangered	endangered		plants		
Sorbus americana	American mountain ash	endangered	endangered		plants		
Sparganium americanum	American bur-reed	endangered	endangered		plants		
Sparganium emersum	Green-fruited bur-reed	endangered	endangered		plants		
Spiranthes lucida	Yellow-lipped ladies' tresses	endangered	endangered		plants		
Spiranthes vernalis	Spring ladies' tresses	endangered	endangered		plants		
Stellaria pubera	Great chickweed	endangered	endangered		plants		
Stylisma pickeringii	Patterson's bindweed	endangered	endangered		plants		
Styrax grandifolius	Bigleaf snowbell bush	endangered	endangered		plants		
Symphoricarpos albus var. albus	Snowberry	endangered	endangered		plants		
Tetraneuris herbacea	Lakeside daisy	endangered	endangered	threatened	plants		
Thelypteris noveboracensis	New York fern	endangered	endangered		plants		
Tilia heterophylla	White basswood	endangered	endangered		plants		
Torreyochloa pallida	Pole manna-grass	endangered	endangered		plants		
Tracaulon arifolium	Halberd-leaved tearthumb	endangered	endangered		plants		
Tradescantia bracteata	Prairie spiderwort	endangered	endangered		plants		
Trichophorum cespitosum	Tufted bulrush	endangered	endangered		plants		
Trientalis borealis	Star-flower	endangered	endangered		plants		
Trillium cernuum	Nodding trillium	endangered	endangered		plants		
Trillium erectum	Ill-scented trillium	endangered	endangered		plants		
Trillium viride	Green trillium	endangered	endangered		plants		
Ulmus thomasii	Rock elm	endangered	endangered		plants		
Utricularia cornuta	Horned bladderwort	endangered	endangered		plants		
Utricularia minor	Small bladderwort	endangered	endangered		plants		
Utricularia subulata	Hair bladderwort	endangered	endangered		plants		
Vaccinium corymbosum	Highbush blueberry	endangered	endangered		plants		
Vaccinium macrocarpon	Large cranberry	endangered	endangered		plants		
Vaccinium oxycoccos	Small cranberry	endangered	endangered		plants		
Vaccinium stamineum	Deerberry	endangered	endangered		plants		
Valeriana uliginosa	Marsh valerian	endangered	endangered		plants		
Valerianella chenopodifolia	Corn salad	endangered	endangered		plants		
Valerianella umbilicata	Corn salad	endangered	endangered		plants		
Vandenboschia boschiana	Filmy fern	endangered	endangered		plants		
Veronica americana	American brooklime	endangered	endangered		plants		
Viola blanda	Hairy white violet	endangered	endangered		plants		
Viola canadensis	Canada violet	endangered	endangered		plants		
Viola primulifolia	Primrose violet	endangered	endangered		plants		
Woodsia ilvensis	Rusty woodsia	endangered	endangered		plants		
Zigadenus elegans	White camas	endangered	endangered		plants		
Clematis occidentalis	Mountain clematis	removed from endangered	endangered		plants		
Corylus cornuta	Beaked hazelnut	removed from endangered	endangered		plants		
Carex communis	Fibrous-footed sedge/fibrous-rooted sedge	removed from threatened	threatened		plants		
Agalinis skinneriana	Pale false foxglove	threatened	threatened		plants		
Amelanchier interior	Shadbush	threatened	threatened		plants		
Ammophila breviligulata	Marram grass	threatened	threatened		plants		
Aster furcatus	Forked aster	threatened	threatened		plants		
Besseya bullii	Kitten tails	threatened	threatened		plants		
Boltonia decurrens	Decurrent false aster	threatened	threatened	threatened	plants		
Buchnera americana	Bluehearts	threatened	threatened		plants		
Cakile edentula var. lacustris	Sea rocket	threatened	threatened		plants		
Carex atlantica	Sedge	threatened	threatened		plants		
Carex aurea	Golden sedge	threatened	threatened		plants		
Carex bromoides	Sedge	threatened	threatened		plants		
Carex cryptolepis	Yellow sedge	threatened	threatened		plants		
Carex oxylepis	Sharp-scaled sedge	threatened	threatened		plants		
Carex prasina	Drooping sedge	threatened	threatened		plants		
Carex viridula	Little green sedge	threatened	threatened		plants		
Carex willdenowii	Willdenow's sedge	threatened	threatened		plants		
Carya aquatica	Water hickory	threatened	threatened		plants		
Chamaedaphne calyculata	Leatherleaf	threatened	threatened		plants		
Cyperus grayoides	Umbrella sedge	threatened	threatened		plants		
Cyperus lancastriensis	Galingale	threatened	threatened		plants		
Dodecatheon frenchii	French's shootingstar	threatened	threatened		plants		
Drosera intermedia	Narrow-leaved sundew	threatened	threatened		plants		
Eleocharis rostellata	Beaked spike rush	threatened	threatened		plants		
Epilobium strictum	Downy willow herb	threatened	threatened		plants		
Equisetum pratense	Meadow horsetail	threatened	threatened		plants		
Euonymus americanus	American strawberry bush	threatened	threatened		plants		
Festuca paradoxa	Cluster fescue	threatened			plants		
Filipendula rubra	Queen-of-the-prairie	threatened	threatened		plants		
Huperzia porophila	Cliff clubmoss	threatened	threatened		plants		
Hylotelephium telephioides	American orpine	threatened	threatened		plants		
Juncus alpinoarticulatus	Richardson's rush	threatened	threatened		plants		
Juniperus communis	Ground juniper	threatened	threatened		plants		
Lathyrus ochroleucus	Pale vetchling	threatened	threatened		plants		
Melothria pendula	Squirting cucumber	threatened	threatened		plants		
Menyanthes trifoliata	Buckbean	threatened	threatened		plants		
Minuartia patula	Slender sandwort	threatened	threatened		plants		
Monarda clinopodia	White bergamot	threatened			plants		
Orobanche ludoviciana	Broomrape	threatened	threatened		plants		
Oxalis illinoensis	Illinois wood sorrel	threatened	threatened		plants		
Phaeophyscia leana	Lea's bog lichen	threatened	threatened		plants		
Phemeranthus parviflorus	Small flower-of-an-hour	threatened	threatened		plants		
Planera aquatica	Water elm	threatened	threatened		plants		
Platanthera flava	Tubercled orchid	threatened	threatened		plants		
Potamogeton gramineus	Grass-leaved pondweed	threatened	threatened		plants		
Quercus montana	Rock chestnut oak	threatened	threatened		plants		
Quercus phellos	Willow oak	threatened	threatened		plants		
Ranunculus harveyi	Harvey's buttercup	threatened			plants		
Rubus odoratus	Purple-flowering raspberry	threatened	threatened		plants		
Rubus pubescens	Dwarf raspberry	threatened	threatened		plants		
Rubus schneideri	Bristly blackberry	threatened	threatened		plants		
Rudbeckia missouriensis	Missouri orange coneflower	threatened	threatened		plants		
Salvia azurea	Blue sage	threatened	threatened		plants		
Schoenoplectus hallii	Hall's bulrush	threatened	threatened		plants		
Solidago sciaphila	Cliff goldenrod	threatened	threatened		plants		
Stenanthium gramineum	Grass-leaved lily	threatened	threatened		plants		
Styrax americana	Storax	threatened	threatened		plants		
Sullivantia sullivantii	Sullivantia	threatened	threatened		plants		
Synandra hispidula	Hairy synandra	threatened	threatened		plants		
Tofieldia glutinosa	False asphodel	threatened	threatened		plants		
Trifolium reflexum	Buffalo clover	threatened	threatened		plants		
Triglochin maritima	Common bog arrowgrass	threatened	threatened		plants		
Triglochin palustris	Slender bog arrowgrass	threatened	threatened		plants		
Urtica chamaedryoides	Nettle	threatened	threatened		plants		
Utricularia intermedia	Flat-leaved bladderwort	threatened	threatened		plants		
Veronica scutellata	Marsh speedwell	threatened	threatened		plants		
Viburnum molle	Arrowwood	threatened	threatened		plants		
Coluber flagellum	Coachwhip	endangered	endangered		reptiles	snakes	
Nerodia fasciata	Southern watersnake	endangered	endangered		reptiles	snakes	
Pantherophis emoryi	Great Plains ratsnake	endangered	endangered		reptiles	snakes	
Sistrurus catenatus	Eastern massasauga	endangered	endangered		reptiles	snakes	
Clonophis kirtlandii	Kirtland's snake	threatened	threatened		reptiles	snakes	
Crotalus horridus	Timber rattlesnake	threatened	threatened		reptiles	snakes	
Heterodon nasicus	Plains hog-nosed snake	threatened	threatened		reptiles	snakes	
Nerodia cyclopion	Mississippi green watersnake	threatened	threatened		reptiles	snakes	
Tantilla gracilis	Flat-headed snake	threatened	threatened		reptiles	snakes	
Thamnophis saurita	Eastern ribbonsnake	threatened	threatened		reptiles	snakes	
Tropidoclonion lineatum	Lined snake	threatened	threatened		reptiles	snakes	
Clemmys guttata	Spotted turtle	endangered	endangered		reptiles	turtles	
Emydoidea blandingii	Blanding's turtle	endangered	endangered		reptiles	turtles	
Kinosternon flavescens	Yellow mud turtle	endangered	endangered		reptiles	turtles	
Macrochelys temminckii	Alligator snapping turtle	endangered	endangered		reptiles	turtles	
Pseudemys concinna	River cooter	endangered	endangered		reptiles	turtles	
Apalone mutica	Smooth softshell	threatened	endangered		reptiles	turtles	
Terrapene ornata	Ornate box turtle	threatened	threatened		reptiles	turtles	
