= List of flora of Arkansas =

Geobotanically, Arkansas belongs to the North American Atlantic Region.

== A ==
- Acer negundo - Boxelder
- Acer saccharum - Sugar maple
- Amorpha ouachitensis - Ouachita leadplant
- Amorpha paniculata - Panicled indigobush
- Amsonia hubrichtii - Arkansas bluestar
- Astragalus soxmaniorum - Soxman's milkvetch

=== B ===
- Betula nigra - River birch
- Betula pendula - White birch (non-native)

=== C ===
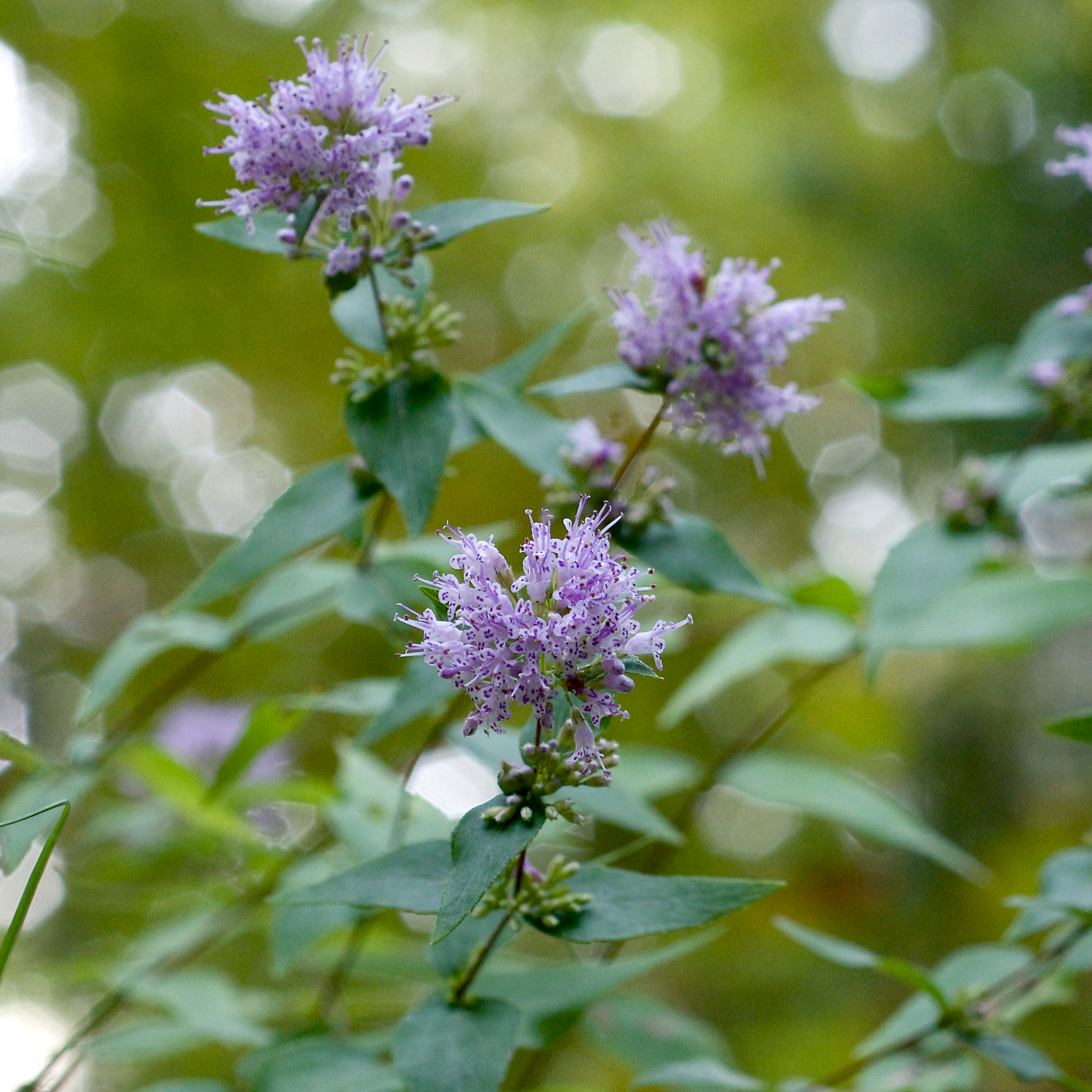
Cunila origanoides

- Calamagrostis porteri ssp. insperata - Ofer hollow reed grass
- Calamovilfa arcuata - A sandgrass
- Carex arkansana - Arkansas sedge
- Carex decomposita
- Carex latebracteata - Waterfall's sedge
- Carex shinnersii - Shinner's sedge
- Carex timida - Timid sedge
- Carya myristiciformis - Nutmeg hickory
- Carya ovata - Shagbark hickory
- Carya tomentosa - Mockernut hickory
- Castanea pumila var. ozarkensis - Ozark chinquapin
- Chelone obliqua var. speciosa - Rose turtlehead
- Cornus florida - Flowering dogwood
- Cunila origanoides - American dittany, mountain oregano
- Cyperus grayoides - Umbrella sedge
- Cypripedium kentuckiense - Southern lady's-slipper

=== D ===
- Delphinium newtonianum - Moore's larkspur
- Delphinium treleasei - Trelease's larkspur
- Diospyros virginiana - American persimmon
- Dodecatheon frenchii - French's shootingstar
- Draba aprica - Open-ground whitlow-grass

=== E ===
- Echinacea paradoxa - Bush's yellow coneflower
- Echinacea sanguinea - Sanguine purple coneflower
- Eriocaulon koernickianum - Dwarf pipewort

=== F ===
- Fothergilla major - Witch-alder

=== G ===
- Galium arkansanum - Arkansas bedstraw

=== H ===
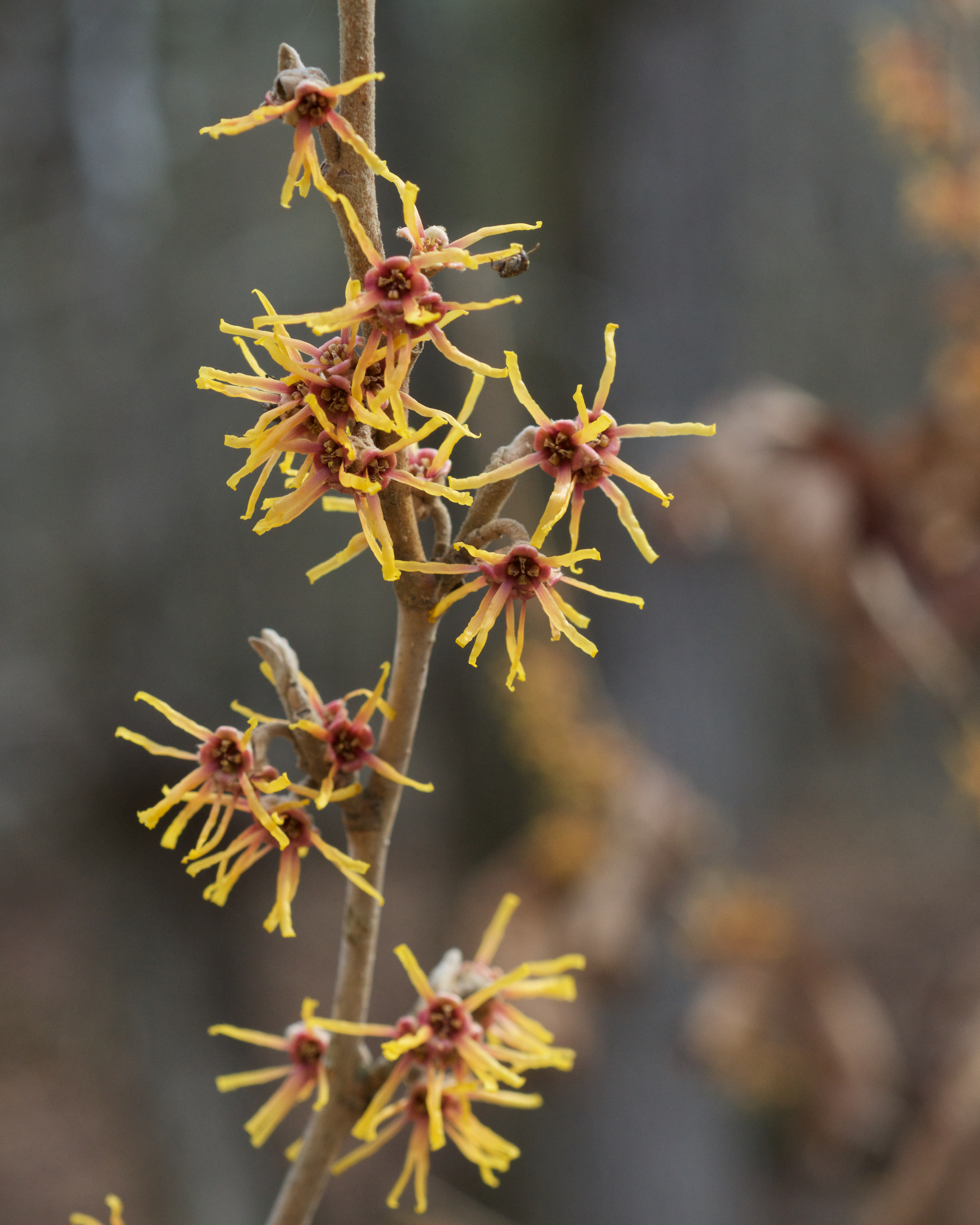
Hamamelis vernalis

- Hamamelis vernalis - Ozark witch hazel
- Harperella nodosa (syn. Ptilimnium nodosum) - Harperella
- Helianthus occidentalis ssp. plantagineus - Shinner's sunflower
- Heuchera villosa var. arkansana - Arkansas alumroot
- Houstonia ouachitana - Ouachita bluet
- Hydrophyllum brownei - Browne's waterleaf

=== J ===
- Juglans nigra - Black walnut
- Juniperus virginiana - Eastern redcedar

=== L ===
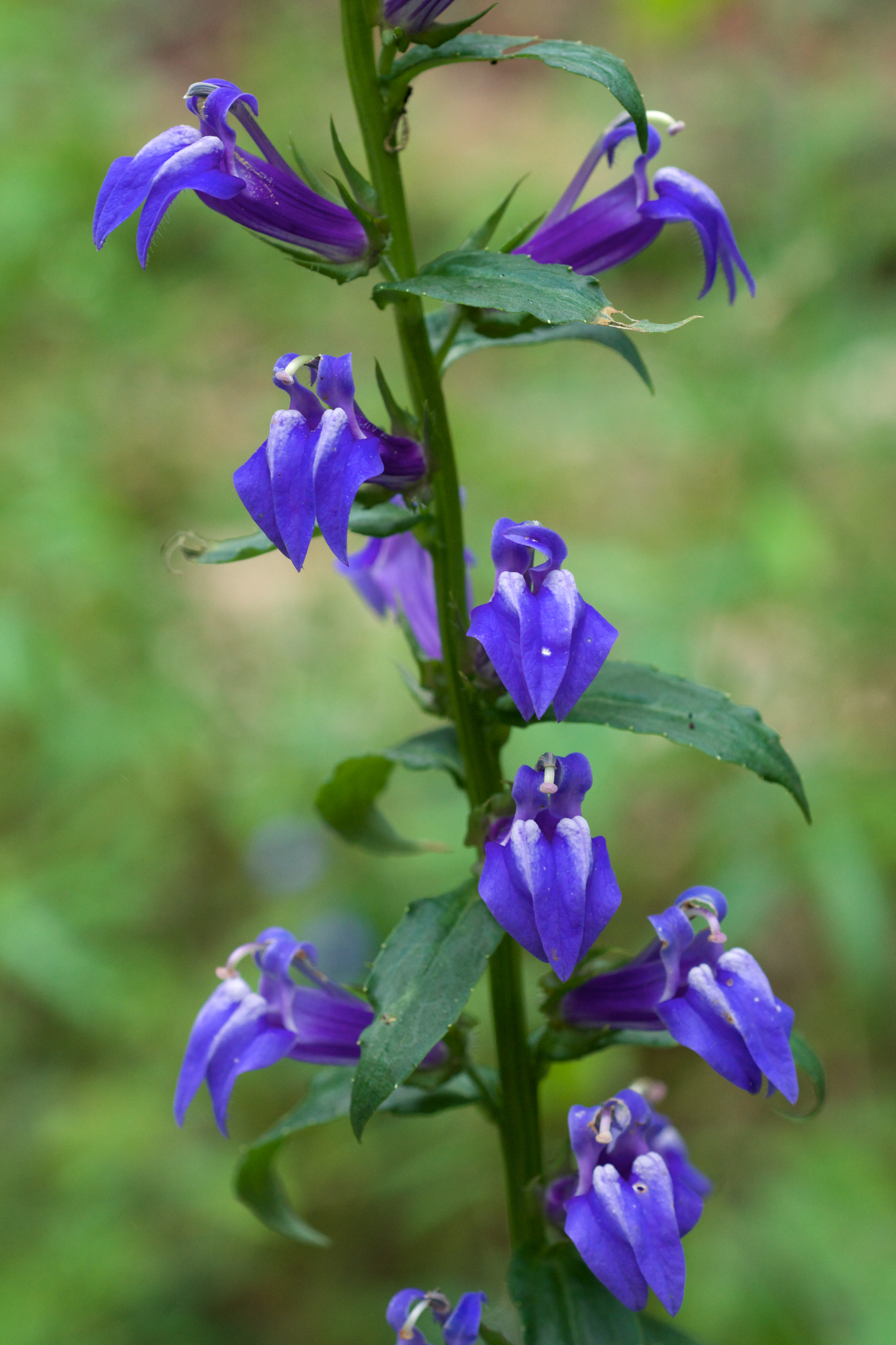
Lobelia siphilitica

- Leitneria floridana - Corkwood
- Liatris compacta - Ouachita blazing star
- Liquidambar styraciflua - Slender silhouette sweetgum
- Lobelia siphilitica - Great blue lobelia
- Lysimachia quadriflora

=== M ===
- Malus coronaria (Pyrus coronaria) - Sweet crabapple (Arkansas State Flower)
- Mespilus canescens - Stern's medlar
- Minuartia godfreyi - Godfrey's sandwort

=== N ===
- Neviusia alabamensis - Alabama snow-wreath

=== O ===
- Oenothera heterophylla ssp. orientalis - Alabama evening primrose
- Oenothera pilosella ssp. sessilis - Prairie evening primrose

=== P ===
- Pinus echinata - Shortleaf pine
- Platanus occidentalis - American sycamore
- Polymnia cossatotensis - Cossatot leafcup
- Prunus serotina - Black cherry
- Prunus virginiana - Chokecherry
- Prunus americana - Wild plum

=== Q ===
- Quercus acerifolia - Maple-leaved oak
- Quercus alba - White oak
- Quercus arkansana - Arkansas oak
- Quercus coccinea - Scarlet oak
- Quercus falcata - Southern red oak
- Quercus imbricaria - Shingle oak
- Quercus incana - Bluejack oak
- Quercus laurifolia - Swamp laurel oak
- Quercus lyrata - Overcup oak
- Quercus macrocarpa - Bur oak
- Quercus margaretta - Sand post oak
- Quercus marilandica - Blackjack oak
- Quercus michauxii - Swamp chestnut oak
- Quercus muehlenbergii - Chinkapin oak
- Quercus nigra - Water oak
- Quercus pagoda - Cherrybark oak

=== R ===
- Rhus aromatica - Aromatic sumac
- Rhus copallina - Winged sumac
- Rhus glabra - Smooth sumac

=== S ===
- Salix nigra - Black willow
- Sassafras albidum - Sassafras
- Schisandra glabra - Climbing magnolia
- Schoenolirion wrightii - Texas sunnybell
- Scutellaria bushii - Bush's skullcap
- Silene ovata - Ovate-leaf catchfly
- Silene regia - Royal catchfly
- Solidago ouachitensis - Ouachita goldenrod
- Streptanthus maculatus ssp. obtusifolius - Clasping jewelflower
- Streptanthus squamiformis - Pineoak jewelflower

=== T ===
- Thalictrum arkansanum - Arkansas meadow-rue
- Tradescantia longipes - Dwarf spiderwort
- Tradescantia ozarkana - Ozark spiderwort
- Trillium pusillum var. ozarkanum - Ozark least trillium
- Trillium viridescens - Ozark trillium

=== U ===
- Ulmus alata - Winged elm
- Ulmus americana - American elm
- Ulmus rubra - Slippery elm
- Ulmus thomasi - Rock elm

=== V ===
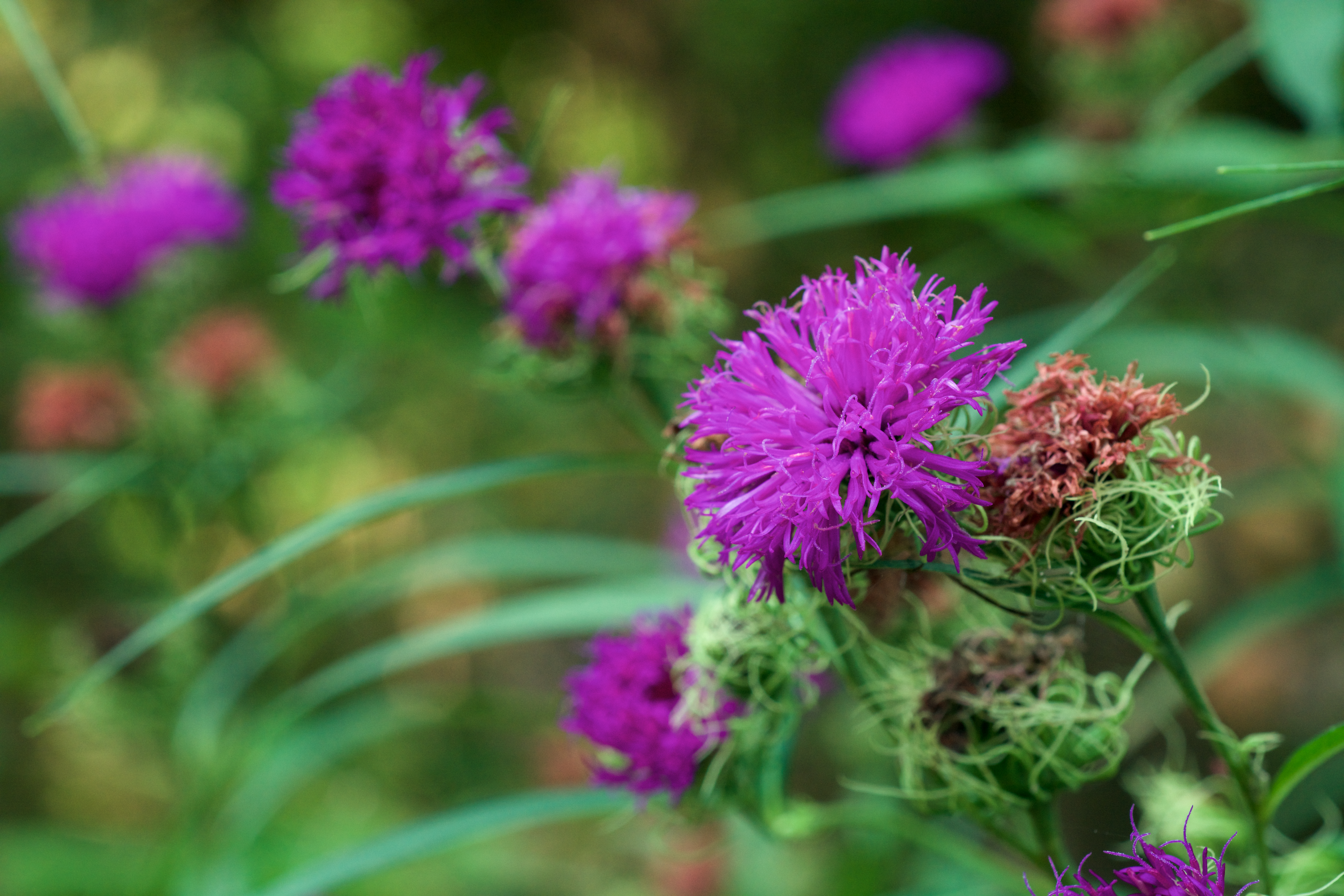
Vernonia arkansana

- Valerianella nuttallii - Nuttall corn-salad
- Valerianella palmeri - Palmer's corn-salad
- Valerianella ozarkana - Ozark corn-salad
- Vernonia arkansana - Arkansas ironweed
- Vernonia lettermannii - Narrowleaf ironweed
