= ESPB =

ESPB or SPB can refer to:

- École secondaire de Par-en-Bas, a school in Nova Scotia, Canada
- Illinois Endangered Species Protection Board, a group that lists threatened and endangered species for the U.S. state of Illinois
