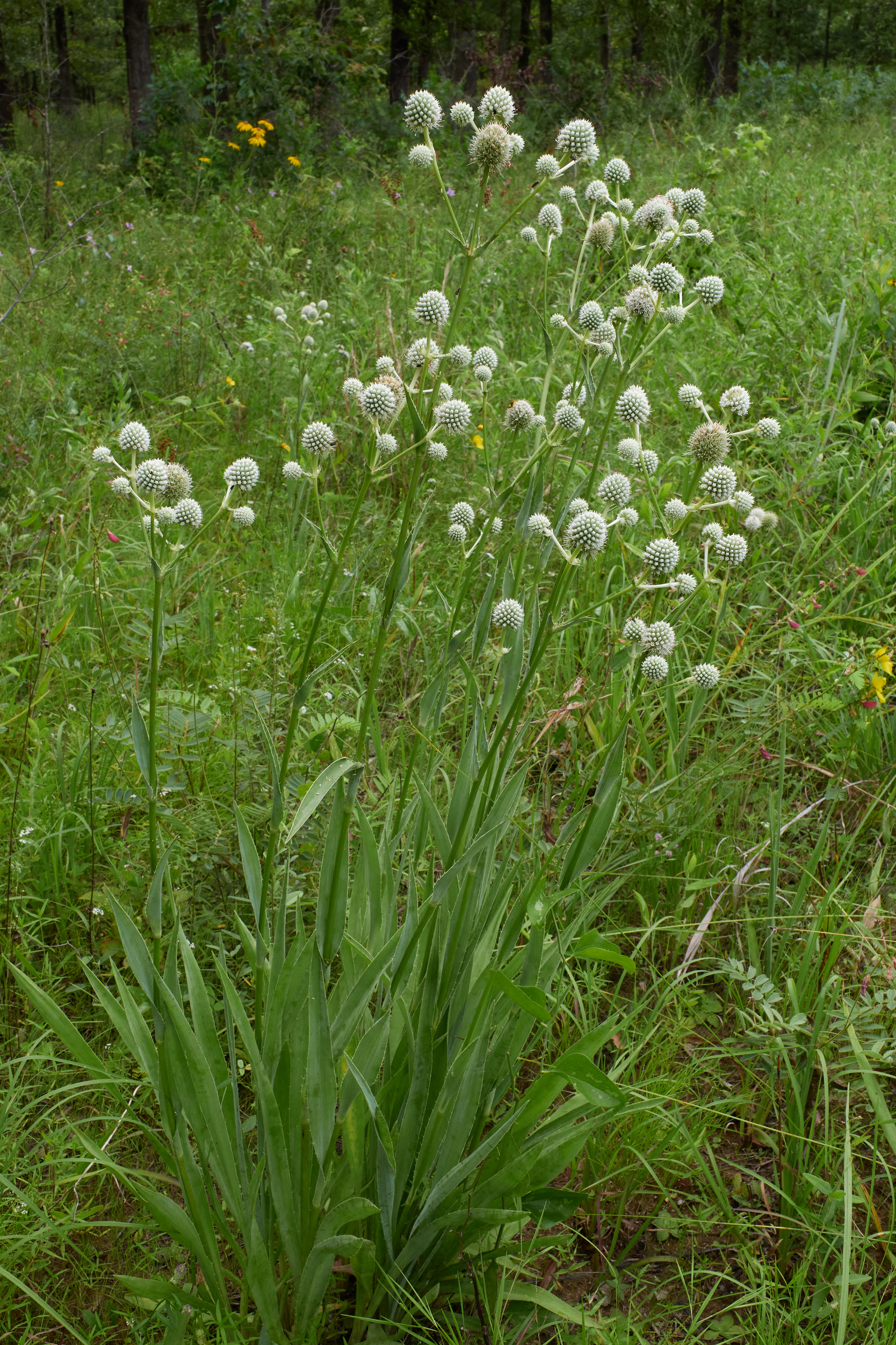

Conservation status
- Secure (NatureServe)

Scientific classification
- Kingdom: Plantae
- Clade: Tracheophytes
- Clade: Angiosperms
- Clade: Eudicots
- Clade: Asterids
- Order: Apiales
- Family: Apiaceae
- Genus: Eryngium
- Species: E. yuccifolium

Binomial name
- Eryngium yuccifolium Michx.

Synonyms
- Eryngium synchaetum J.M.Coult. & Rose

= Eryngium yuccifolium =

Species of flowering plant in the celery family

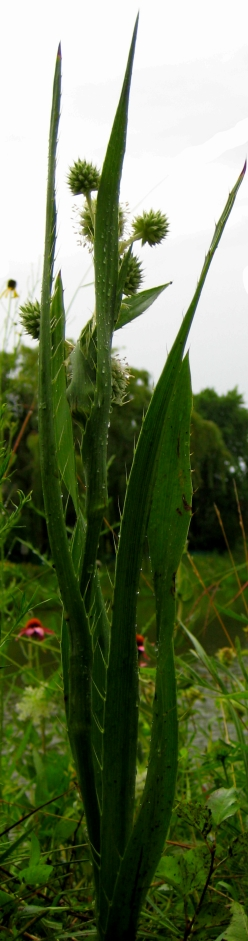
Whole plant showing yucca-like leaves

Eryngium yuccifolium, known as rattlesnake master, button eryngo, and button snake-root, is a perennial herb of the parsley family native to the tallgrass prairies of central and eastern North America. It grows from Minnesota east to Ohio and south to Texas and Florida, including a few spots in Connecticut, New Jersey, Maryland, and Delaware. There are two varieties found in the wild, the northern rattlesnake master (Eryngium yuccifolium var. yuccifolium) and the southern rattlesnake master (Eryngium yuccifolium var. synchaetum).

== Name ==
The common name "rattlesnake master" is attributed to early European pioneers erroneously believing the plant to be an antidote for rattlesnake venom based upon Native Americans' various medicinal uses of the plant. The species name yuccifolium "yucca-leaved" was given because its leaves resemble those of yuccas.

== Description ==
The leaves are stiff, long and narrow with a sharp tip, 15–100 cm (0–5 ft) long but only 1–3 cm (0.39–1.18 in) broad. They are bluish-green, and covered in a waxy coating. On the edges are regularly spaced bristles or spines. The root system consists of a central taproot surrounded by thick fleshy fibrous roots.

It grows up to 1.8 m (5.9 ft) tall, with 10–40 dense, ball-shaped umbels of flowers produced at the top of each stem. Each of these condensed umbels is 1–3 cm (0.5–1 in) in diameter, resembling flowerheads. Individual flowers in the umbels are small, 3–4 mm in diameter, with greenish-white or bluish-white petals and a faint honey-like scent. Underneath each flower is a spiny green bract, and underneath each flower cluster is a small star-like rosette of spiny bracts. The flowers are produced in July and August.

After the flowerbuds open, the pollen matures and is released two to three days before the stigmas become receptive. This encourages cross-pollination by making it unlikely that a given flower's pollen will fertilize the stigma of the same flower. Rattlesnake master has unusually high seed set (close to 90%).

== Distribution and habitat ==
Eryngium yuccifolium var. yuccifolium, the northern variety, is distributed widely throughout the eastern, midwestern, and southeastern United States. It grows in pine savannas, pine flatwoods over loamy or clay soils, wet to dry prairies, olivine barrens, diabase barrens and glades, and other open sites with at least periodic moisture.

Eryngium yuccifolium var. synchaetum, the southern variety, is endemic to the southeastern Coastal Plain, from southeast North Carolina to south Florida and west across the Gulf Coastal Plain. It is found in wet savannas, particularly those over calcareous clay soils.

== Ecology ==
In remnant natural areas, Eryngium yuccifolium is fairly intolerant of anthropogenic disturbance. It readily establishes when planted in prairie restorations.

The flowers attract many insects, including short and long-tongued bees, flies, beetles, and butterflies, but most numerous of all are wasps. It is a larval host to the rare rattlesnake-master borer moth (Papaipema eryngii).

E. yuccifolium is mostly self-pollinated, but is recognized to be of special value to native bees because it attracts large numbers of them for pollination.

Fire is known to facilitate the spread of E. yuccifolium, with establishment of its seedlings increasing because of fire. It can increase in overall abundance in response to disturbance from fire.

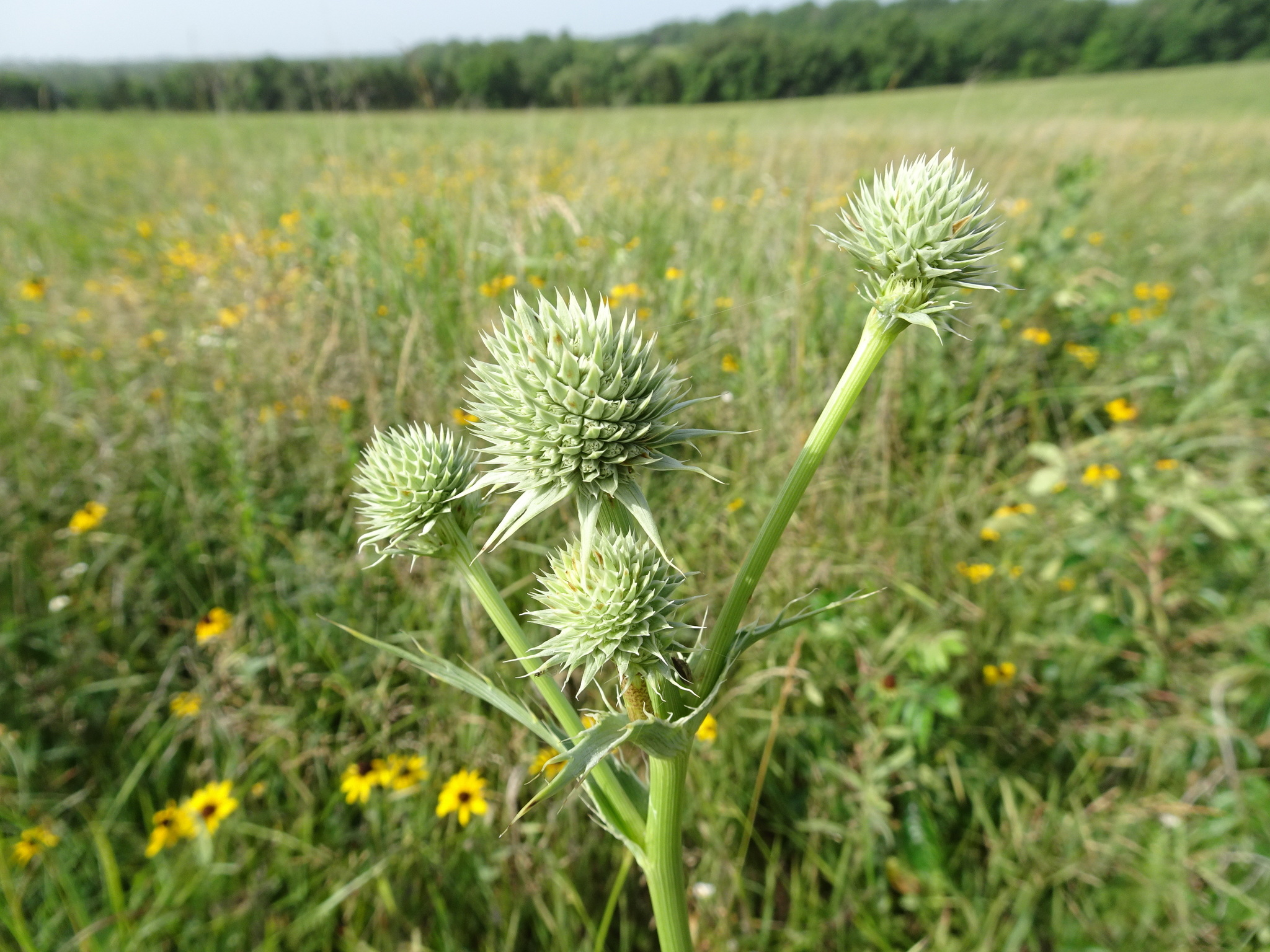
Douglas County, Kansas, 2020

== Cultivation ==
It is sold by native plant nurseries for prairie or native meadow restoration and for gardens and landscapes. It does best with full sun and well-drained soil, with a pH range of 5–7.5. It can die from root rot if the soil stays wet or moist for too long. Once planted it is best left undisturbed and never dug up and reset as with many perennials because it develops a large taproot and other thick, fleshy roots. It often self-sows a little to a good amount in gardens. When planted from seed, a period of cold-moist stratification is required.

== Uses ==
Fibers of rattlesnake master have been found as one of the primary materials used in the ancient shoe construction of midwestern Native Americans. The roots were used medicinally to treat respiratory problems, rheumatism, liver problems, induce vomiting, and treat rattlesnake bites. An infusion would be drunk to relive bladder problems and muscle pains.
