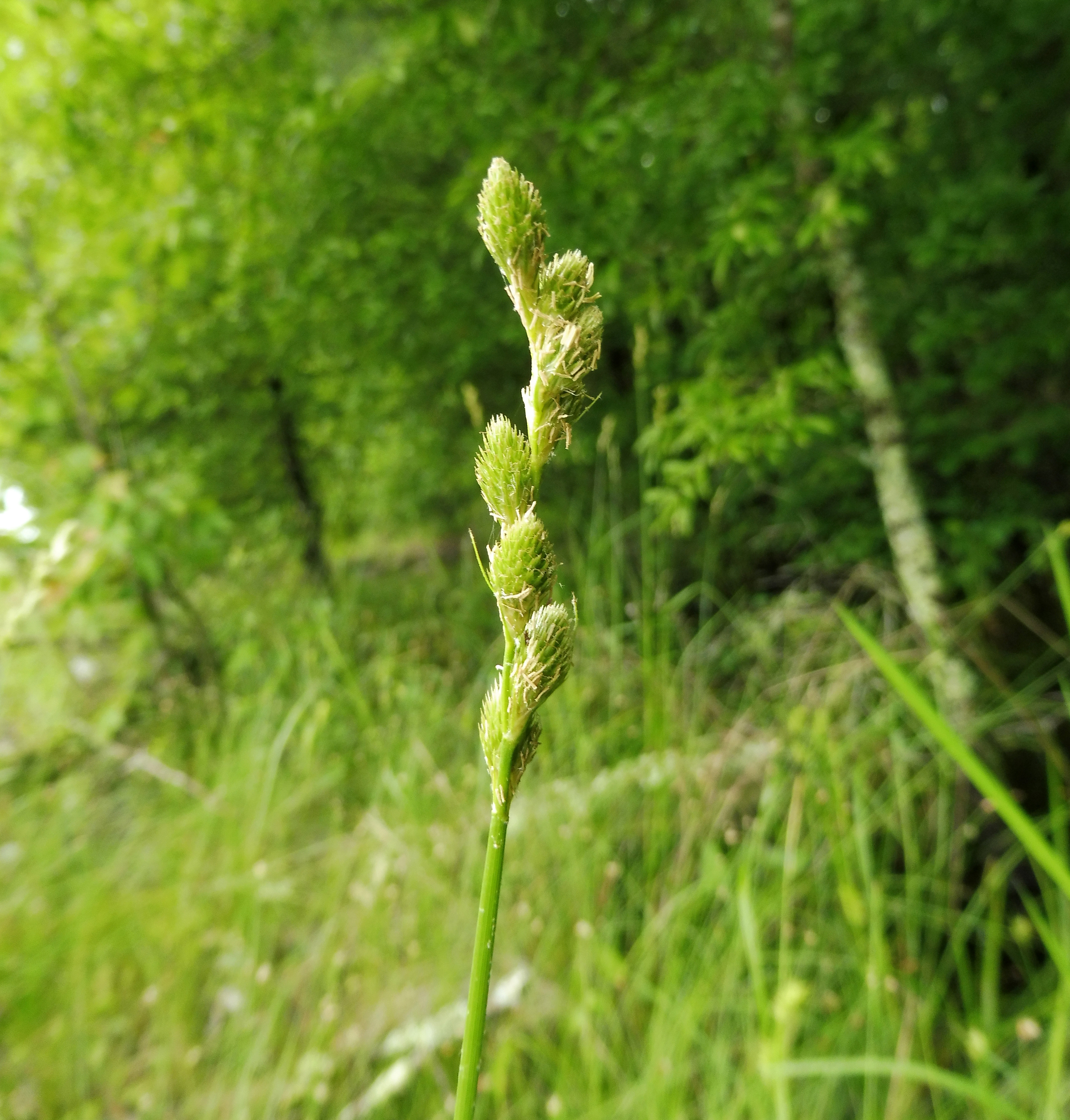

Scientific classification
- Kingdom: Plantae
- Clade: Tracheophytes
- Clade: Angiosperms
- Clade: Monocots
- Clade: Commelinids
- Order: Poales
- Family: Cyperaceae
- Genus: Carex
- Subgenus: Carex subg. Vignea
- Section: Carex sect. Ovales
- Species: C. alata

Binomial name
- Carex alata Torrey

= Carex alata =

Species of grass-like plant

Carex alata, commonly called broad-winged sedge, is a species of flowering plant in the sedge family. It is native to eastern North America, in Canada and the United States. It grows in wet, marshy areas. The species name alata is Latin for "winged", in reference to its winged perigynia.

== Description ==
Carex alata is a perennial that flowers in spring, fruiting in late spring and summer. It may go dormant in hot summer weather if soils are not kept consistently moist.
