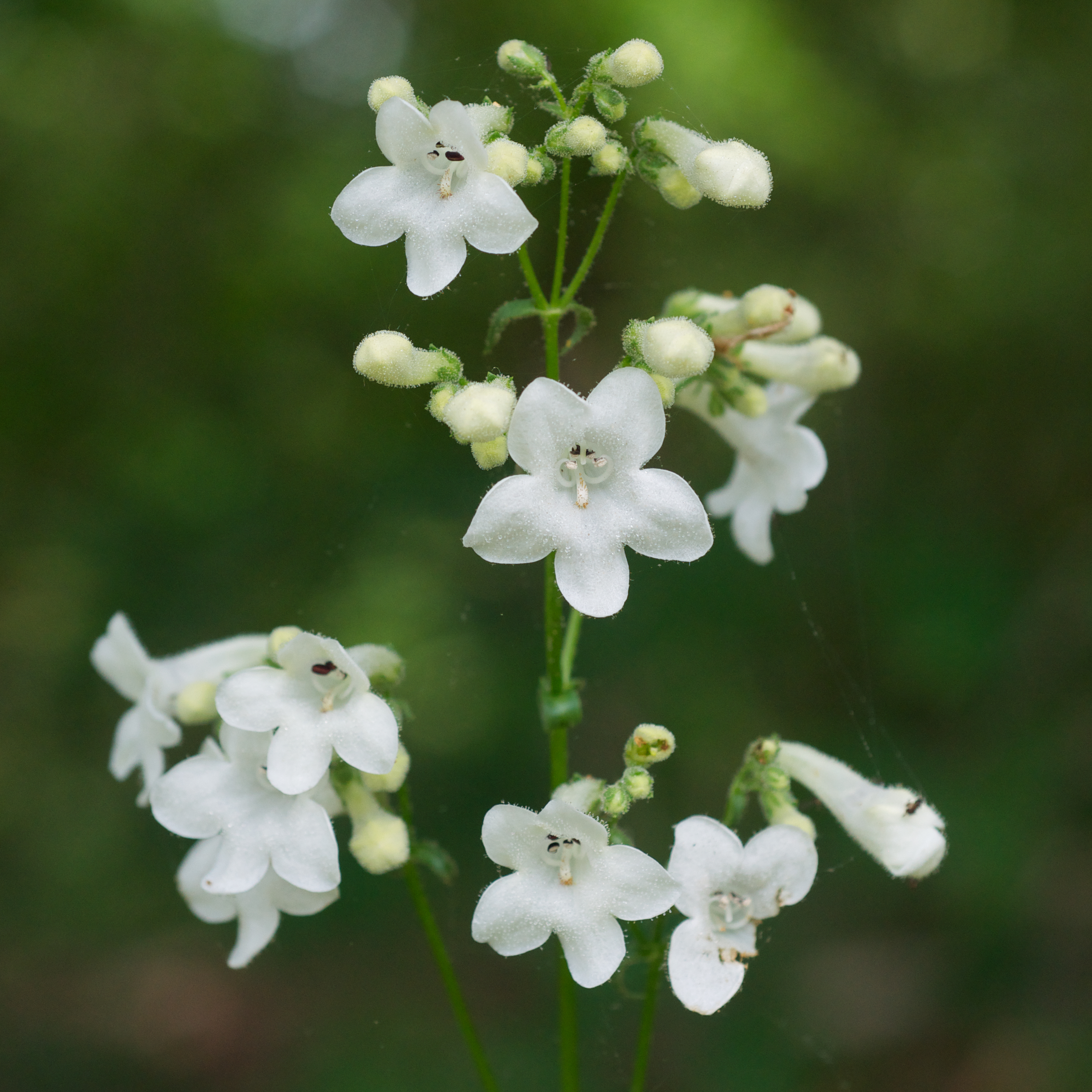

Conservation status
- Secure (NatureServe)

Scientific classification
- Kingdom: Plantae
- Clade: Tracheophytes
- Clade: Angiosperms
- Clade: Eudicots
- Clade: Asterids
- Order: Lamiales
- Family: Plantaginaceae
- Genus: Penstemon
- Species: P. tubaeflorus

Binomial name
- Penstemon tubaeflorus Nutt.

= Penstemon tubaeflorus =

Species of flowering plant

Penstemon tubaeflorus, common name white wand beardtongue, is a species of Penstemon found in the United States and the lower parts of Canada.
