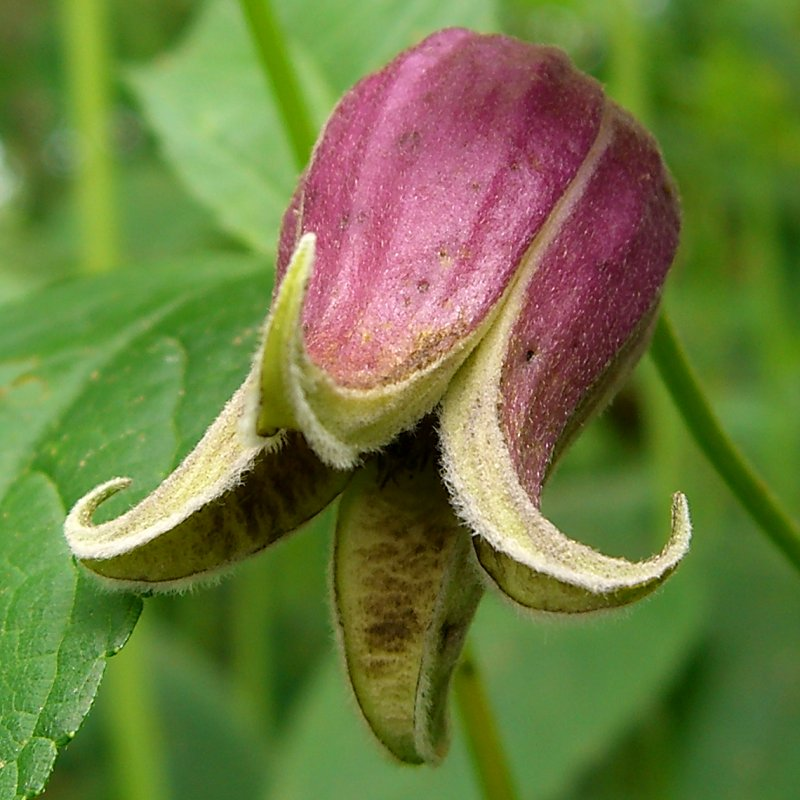
- Flower of leatherflower

Scientific classification
- Kingdom: Plantae
- Clade: Tracheophytes
- Clade: Angiosperms
- Clade: Eudicots
- Order: Ranunculales
- Family: Ranunculaceae
- Genus: Clematis
- Species: C. viorna

Binomial name
- Clematis viorna L.

= Clematis viorna =

Species of flowering plant

Clematis viorna, commonly known as vasevine or leatherflower, is a flowering vine native to the southeastern United States. It grows in wooded habitats and bears purple flowers in spring and summer.

== Description ==
Clematis viorna is a vine up to four meters long. The stems are almost completely free of hairs, or may have long or short soft hairs below the node. Leaves are usually cut into four to eight leaflets, with a terminal leaflet similar to a tendril. Some leaves may not be cut into leaflets. The leaflets are lance-shaped to oval-shaped, ranging from unlobed to bearing two or three lobes to further divided into two or three sub-leaflets, the leaflets at the base of the leaf being most deeply divided. The leaves range from 2 to 12 centimeters (0.79 to 4.72 in) in length and 1 to 5 centimeters (0.39 to 1.97 in) in breadth (occasionally as wide as 6 centimeters (2.4 in). They lack conspicuous netted veins, and bear a sparse to dense coating of long short hairs on the underside.

From one to seven flowers are borne in the leaf axils. The flowers range from bell-shaped to broadly-urn shaped. Like other Clematis, petals are absent; what appear to be petals are in fact colored sepals. They range in color from light purple to reddish-purple, lightening and becoming a creamy yellow towards the tip of the sepal.

== Taxonomy ==
The species was described by Linnaeus in Species Plantarum in 1753.

== Distribution and habitat ==
Leatherflower is found naturally from southeastern Pennsylvania and Delaware south to Georgia, and west across the Mississippi Valley to Missouri and Arkansas. It grows in mesic forests and woodlands, including wooded cliffs and the banks of streams, and in thickets. It flourishes on mafic substrates.

== Ecology ==
The flowers bloom in spring and summer.
