= Rubus missouricus =

Scientific classification
- Kingdom: Plantae
- Clade: Tracheophytes
- Clade: Angiosperms
- Clade: Eudicots
- Clade: Rosids
- Order: Rosales
- Family: Rosaceae
- Genus: Rubus
- Species: R. missouricus

Binomial name
- Rubus missouricus L.H.Bailey 1932

Synonyms
- Rubus clandestinus L.H.Bailey; Rubus jejunus L.H.Bailey; Rubus mediocris L.H.Bailey; Rubus offectus L.H.Bailey; Rubus schneideri L.H.Bailey; Rubus subsolanus L.H.Bailey

Species of fruit and plant

Rubus missouricus is a North American species of bristleberry in section Setosi of the genus Rubus, a member of the rose family. It is found in scattered locations in the north-central (Minnesota, Wisconsin, Michigan, Indiana, Illinois, Iowa, Missouri) and east central (Virginia, Maryland, West Virginia) parts of the United States. Nowhere is it very common.
