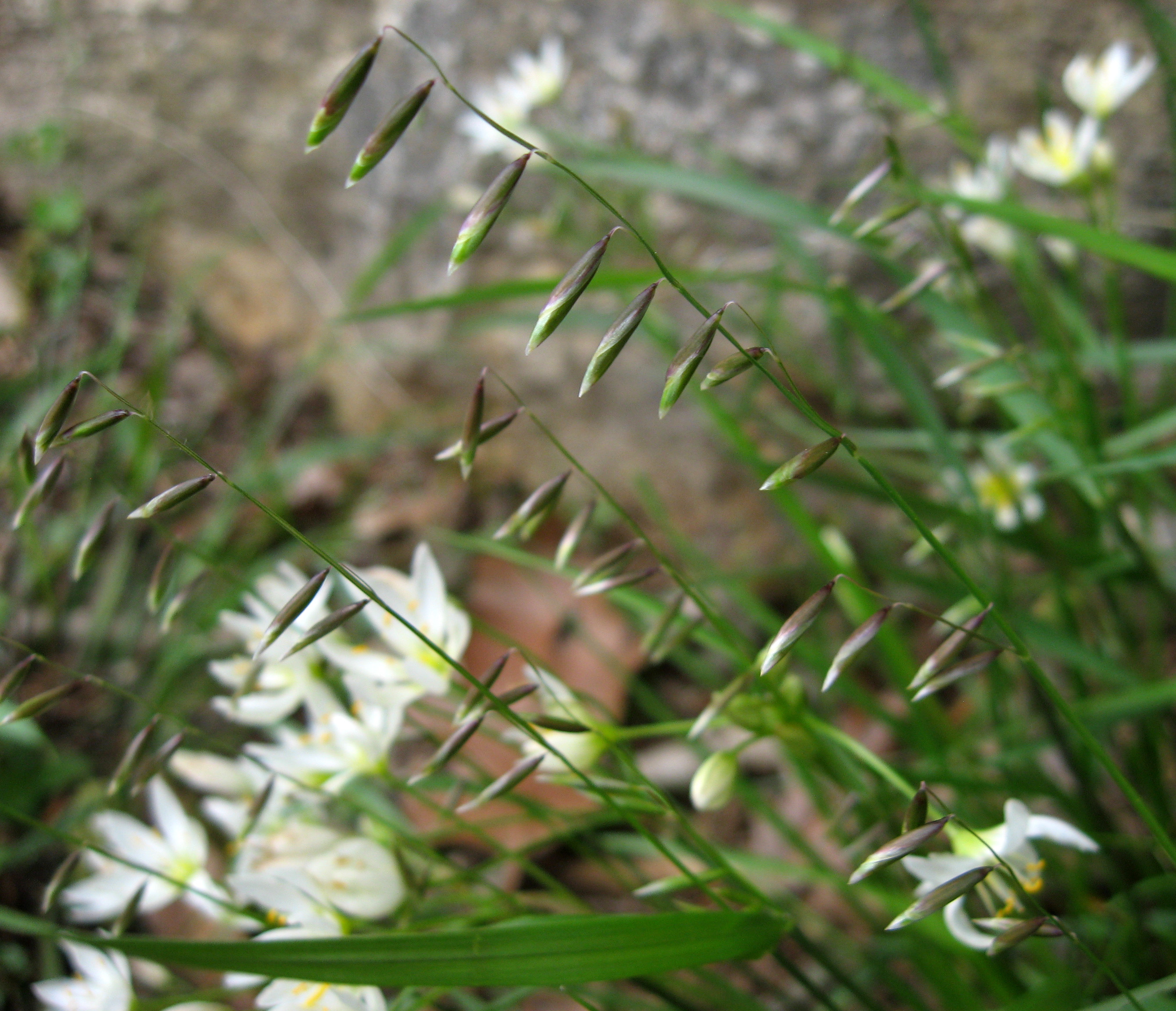
- Maturing florets

Scientific classification
- Kingdom: Plantae
- Clade: Tracheophytes
- Clade: Angiosperms
- Clade: Monocots
- Clade: Commelinids
- Order: Poales
- Family: Poaceae
- Subfamily: Pooideae
- Genus: Melica
- Species: M. mutica

Binomial name
- Melica mutica Walter.

= Melica mutica =

Species of grass

Melica mutica, the twoflower melicgrass, is a grass species in the family Poaceae that can be found in southeastern United States.

== Description ==
The species is perennial and caespitose with elongated rhizomes. Its culms are 45–100 centimetres (18–39 in) long. Leaf-sheaths are tubular and scaberulous while its eciliate membrane is 0.5–1 millimetre (0.020–0.039 in) long. The species also have conduplicated or flat leaf-blades which are 2–6 millimetres (0.079–0.236 in) wide and have scaberulous or smooth bottom which is also either glabrous or puberulous. The panicle is open, lanceolate, and 4–16 centimetres (1.6–6.3 in) long. The main panicle branches are widespread and almost racemose.

Its spikelets are cuneated, pendulous, solitary and are 7–11 millimetres (0.28–0.43 in) long. Fertile spikelets have filiformed pedicels. They also have 2 fertile florets which are diminished at the apex. Lemma have ribbed literal veins with rugulose and scaberulous bottom. Palea is ciliolate and have scaberulous keels. Rhachilla is extended while sterile florets are barren, cuneate and are clumped. They are 2 millimetres (0.079 in) long and have truncated sterile lemmas as well.

The species glumes are low and wide. Both the lower and upper glumes are keelless, oblong and are 6–9 millimetres (0.24–0.35 in) long. Flowers are fleshy, oblong, truncate, and grow together, the 3 anthers of which are 3 millimetres (0.12 in) in length. Fruits are caryopses, have an additional pericarp, and are 2–3 millimetres (0.079–0.118 in) long.
