= Papaipema eryngii =

Scientific classification
- Domain: Eukaryota
- Kingdom: Animalia
- Phylum: Arthropoda
- Class: Insecta
- Order: Lepidoptera
- Superfamily: Noctuoidea
- Family: Noctuidae
- Tribe: Apameini
- Genus: Papaipema
- Species: P. eryngii

Binomial name
- Papaipema eryngii Bird, 1917

Species of moth

Papaipema eryngii, the rattlesnake-master borer, is a species of cutworm or dart moth in the family Noctuidae. It is found in North America. It bores into the rattlesnake master, Eryngium yuccifolium, at the stalk, inverts and develops, killing the plant in the process. In order to mature, the moth needs a mature rattlesnake master or multiple young stalks.

== Ecology ==
The rattlesnake-master borer moth larvae bore into the stem of the plant; population estimates can be therefore based on the presence of borer holes found in the plant. Although the range of P. eryngii overlaps with that of other Papaipema species whose larvae also try to bore into the rattlesnake master, these larvae are unable to survive because they have not adapted to the defensive chemical response of the plant, unlike P. eryngii.

== Range ==
The range of the moth is in part restricted by its host plant. It is found in Arkansas, Illinois, Kansas, Kentucky, Missouri, and Oklahoma; the species is now extirpated in Iowa and North Carolina.

== Conservation ==
Papaipema eryngii is the only species of its genus to have been gone through the petition process for federal protection; the petition was declined in 2020 based on the number of P. eryngii populations and that the species was seen to have adequate numbers and resiliency to survive catastrophic events and to adapt to changing conditions.

P. eryngii is listed as endangered in the state of Illinois.
