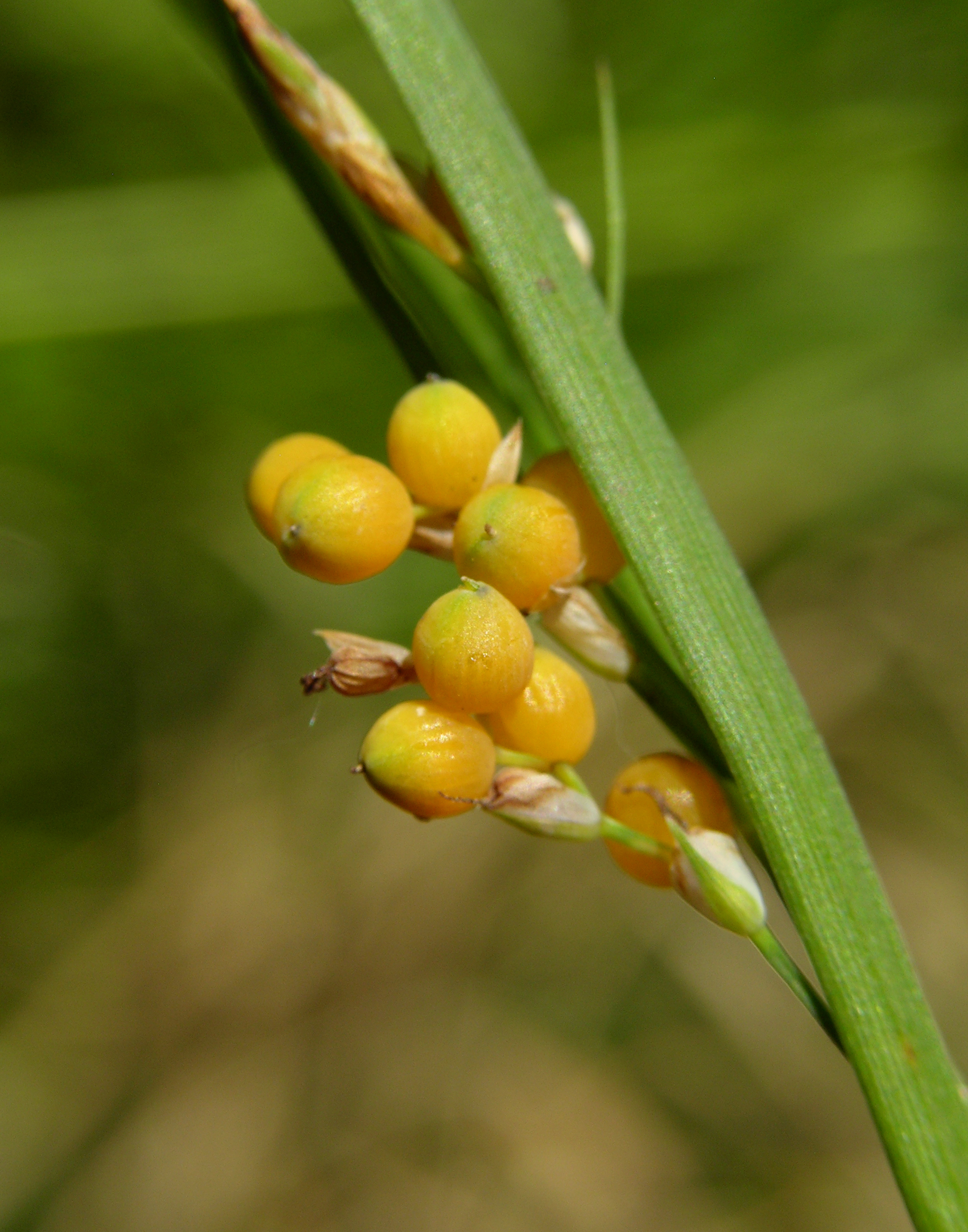

Scientific classification
- Kingdom: Plantae
- Clade: Tracheophytes
- Clade: Angiosperms
- Clade: Monocots
- Clade: Commelinids
- Order: Poales
- Family: Cyperaceae
- Genus: Carex
- Section: Carex sect. Bicolores
- Species: C. aurea

Binomial name
- Carex aurea Nutt.

= Carex aurea =

Species of grass-like plant

Carex aurea is a species of sedge known by the common name golden sedge. It is native to much of North America, including most of Canada and the western, upper Midwest, and northeastern United States. It grows in wet habitat, often on soils of a basic pH.

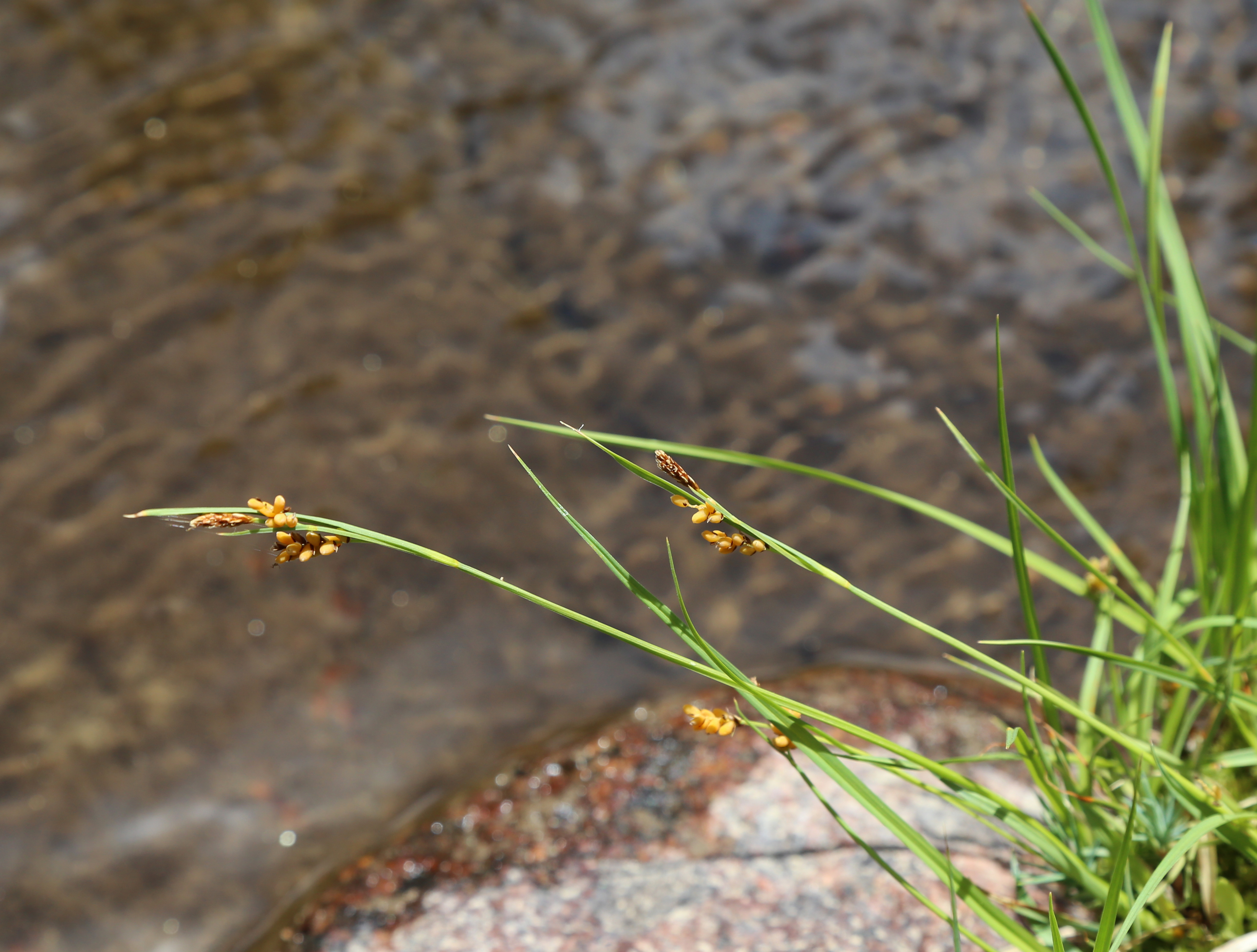
Carex aurea on stream bank

== Description ==
Carex aurea produces stems up to about 40 cm (16 in) tall. The inflorescence produces staminate and pistillate flowers, the latter yielding rounded fruits. The fruit is coated in a sac called a perigynium which is fleshy and green at full size and then turns bright orange just before it falls off.
