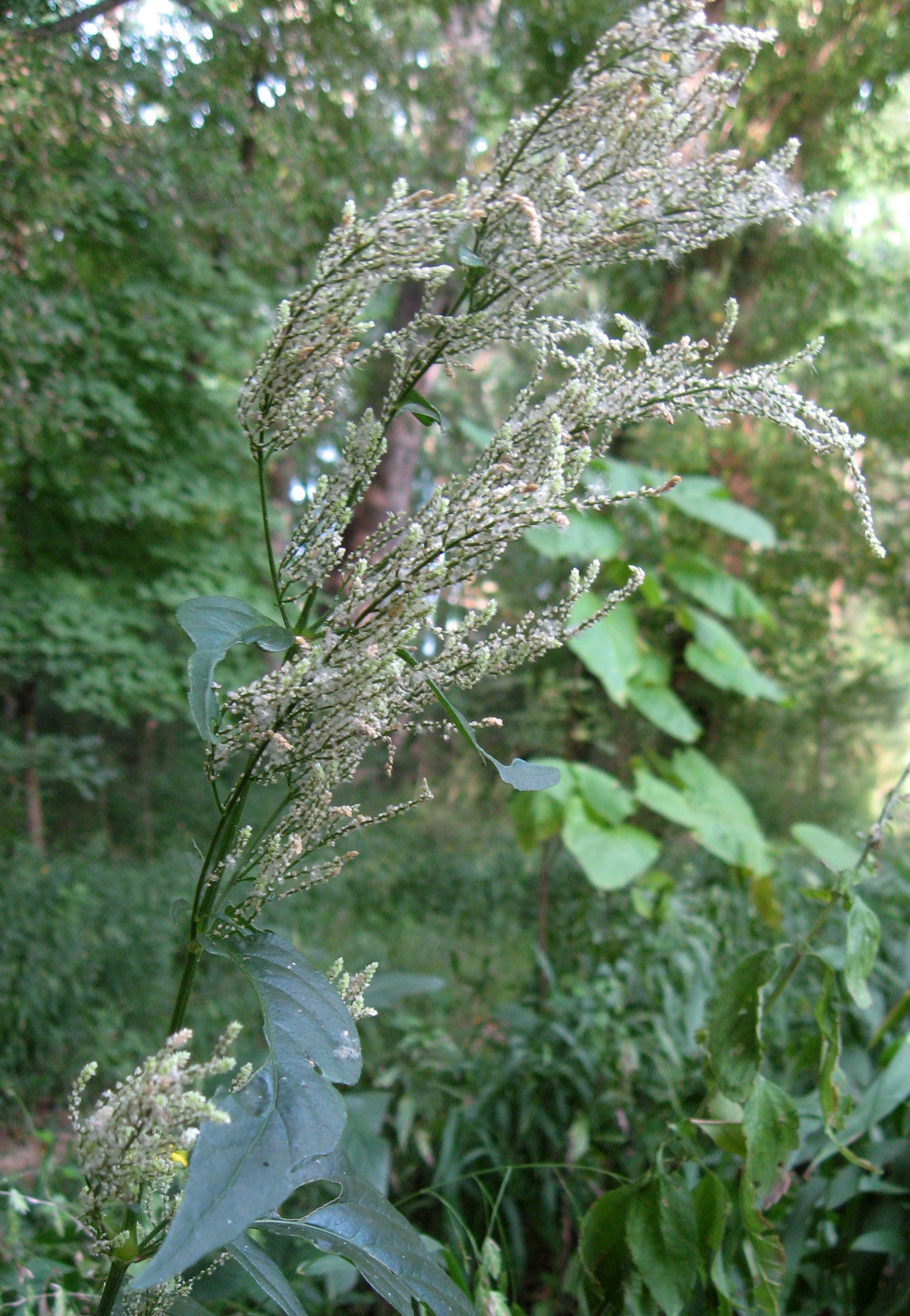

Scientific classification
- Kingdom: Plantae
- Clade: Tracheophytes
- Clade: Angiosperms
- Clade: Eudicots
- Order: Caryophyllales
- Family: Amaranthaceae
- Genus: Iresine
- Species: I. rhizomatosa

Binomial name
- Iresine rhizomatosa Standl.

= Iresine rhizomatosa =

Species of flowering plant

Iresine rhizomatosa is a species of plant in the family Amaranthaceae. It is native to the Americas. In the United States, it has a spotty distribution, being concentrated in the Ozark and Ouachita Mountains and along the coast. It is often found in thin woods over sandy alluvial soil, often along rivers or dunes. It is a rhizomatous perennial that produces white flowers in the fall. It is dioecious, with male and female flowers on separate individuals.
