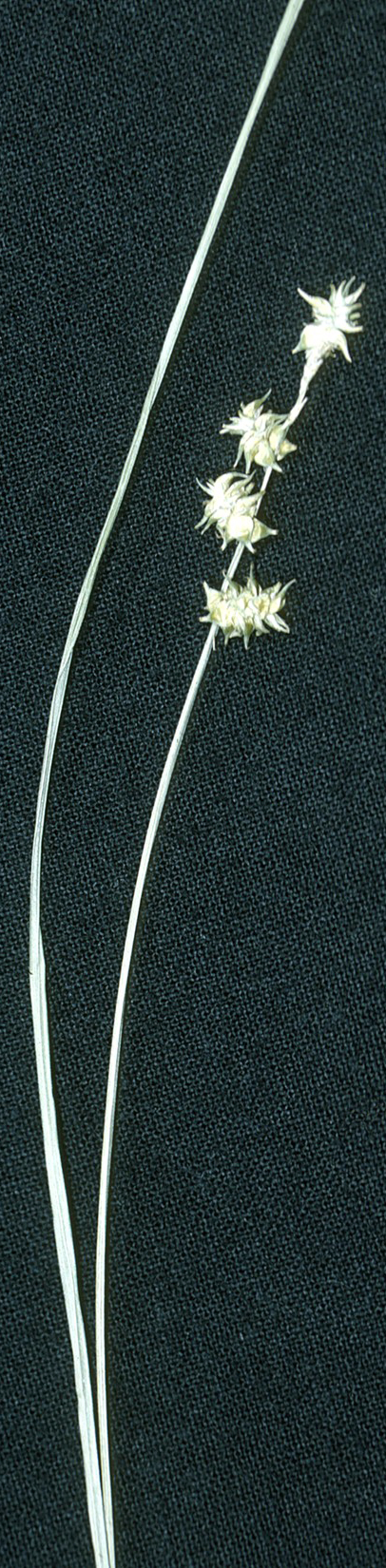

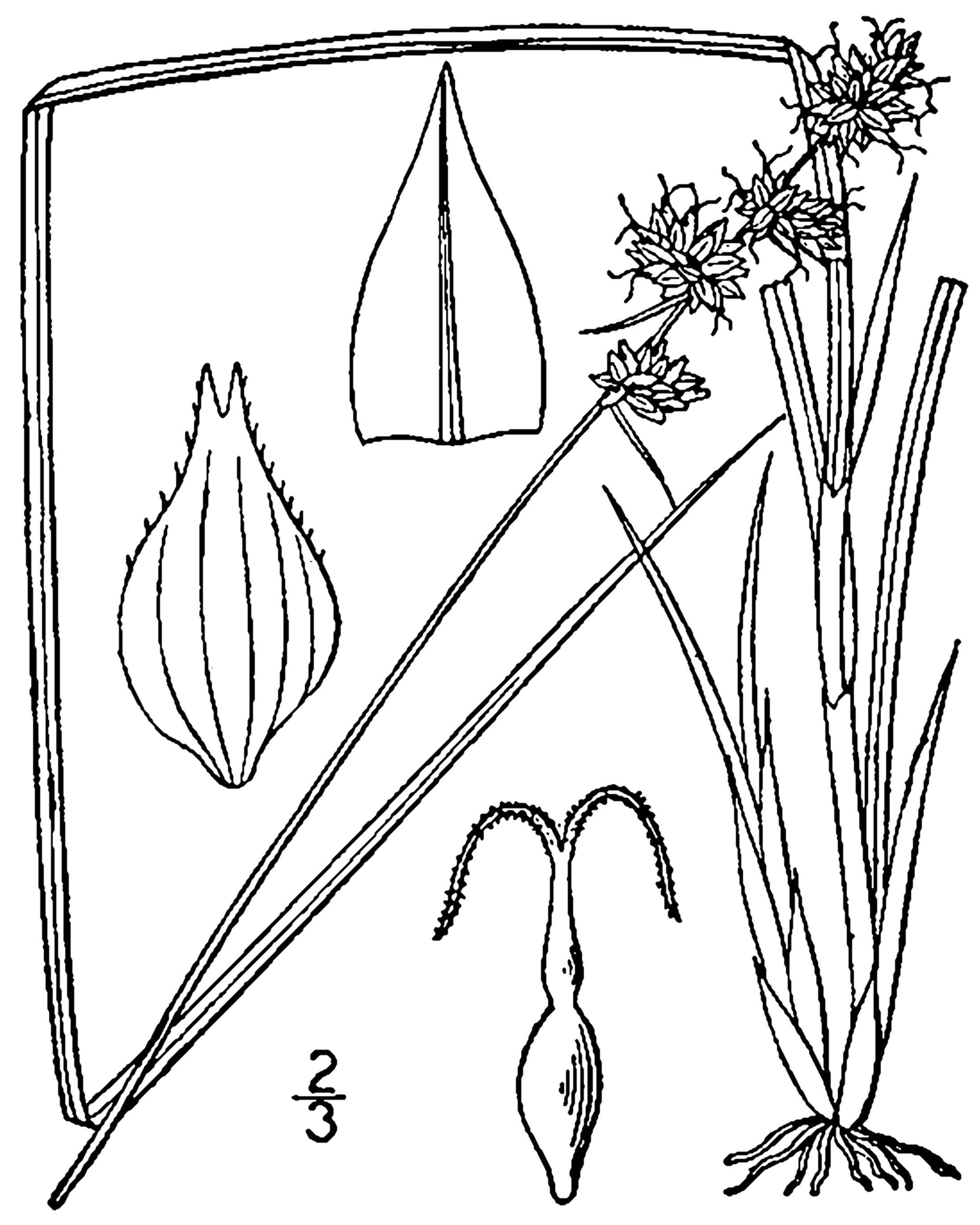
- Botanical illustration

Conservation status
- Least Concern (IUCN 3.1)

Scientific classification
- Kingdom: Plantae
- Clade: Tracheophytes
- Clade: Angiosperms
- Clade: Monocots
- Clade: Commelinids
- Order: Poales
- Family: Cyperaceae
- Genus: Carex
- Species: C. atlantica

Binomial name
- Carex atlantica L.H.Bailey

Synonyms
- List: Carex atlantica var. capillacea (L.H.Bailey) Cronquist; Carex atlantica var. incomperta (E.P.Bicknell) F.J.Herm.; Carex delicatula E.P.Bicknell; Carex echinata var. conferta (Chapm.) L.H.Bailey; Carex howei Mack.; Carex incomperta E.P.Bicknell; Carex interior var. capillacea L.H.Bailey; Carex mohriana Mack.; Carex scirpoides var. capillacea (L.H.Bailey) Fernald; Carex stellulata f. capillacea (L.H.Bailey) Kük.; Carex stellulata var. conferta Chapm.

= Carex atlantica =

Species of flowering plant

Carex atlantica, the prickly bog sedge, is a species of a flowering plant in the family Cyperaceae, native to eastern North America, and eastern Hispaniola. It is usually found growing in bogs or acidic seeps.

== Subtaxa ==
The following subspecies are currently accepted:

- Carex atlantica subsp. atlantica – Entire range, except Ontario, Québec, Vermont, and the Dominican Republic
- Carex atlantica subsp. capillacea (L.H.Bailey) Reznicek – Entire range, except West Virginia
