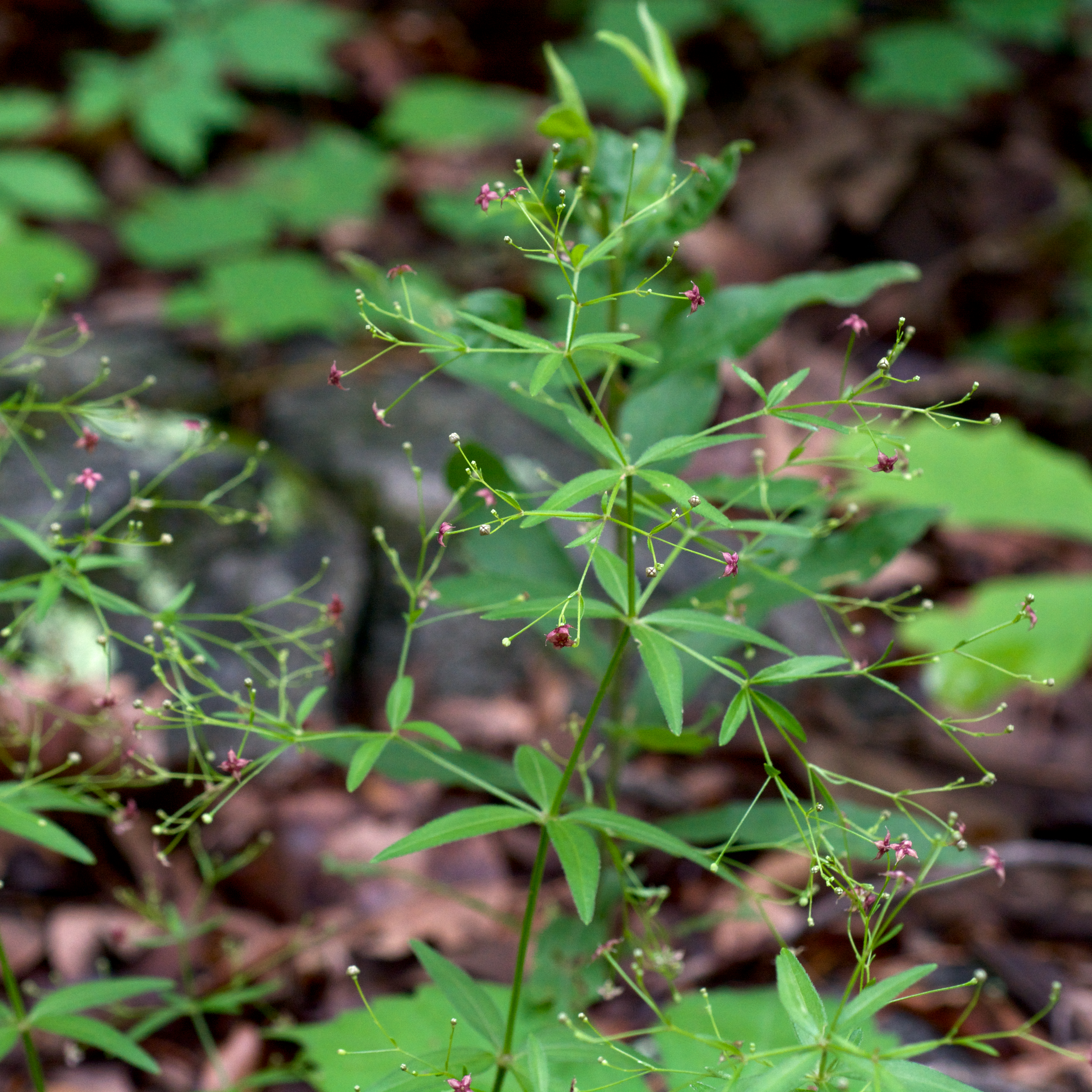

Scientific classification
- Kingdom: Plantae
- Clade: Tracheophytes
- Clade: Angiosperms
- Clade: Eudicots
- Clade: Asterids
- Order: Gentianales
- Family: Rubiaceae
- Genus: Galium
- Species: G. arkansanum

Binomial name
- Galium arkansanum A.Gray

= Galium arkansanum =

Arkansas bedstraw

Species of plant

Galium arkansanum, the Arkansas bedstraw, is a plant species in the Rubiaceae. It is native to the Ozark and Ouachita Mountains of Missouri, Arkansas and Oklahoma in the United States.
