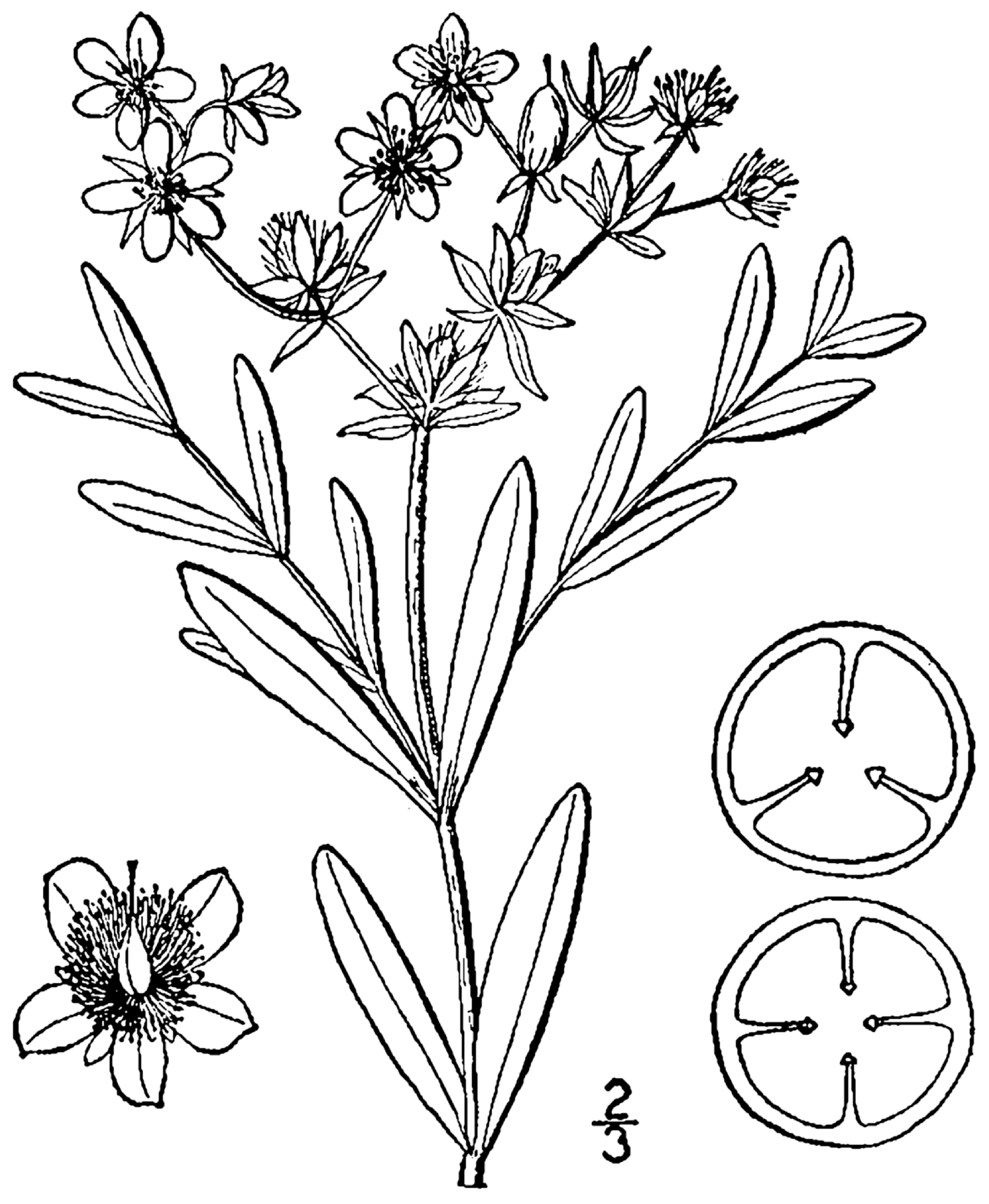

Scientific classification
- Kingdom: Plantae
- Clade: Tracheophytes
- Clade: Angiosperms
- Clade: Eudicots
- Clade: Rosids
- Order: Malpighiales
- Family: Hypericaceae
- Genus: Hypericum
- Section: H. sect. Myriandra
- Species: H. adpressum

Binomial name
- Hypericum adpressum W.P.C.Barton

= Hypericum adpressum =

Species of flowering plant

Hypericum adpressum, common names creeping St. Johnswort and bog St. Johnswort, is a flowering perennial plant found growing on wet ground in the United States.
