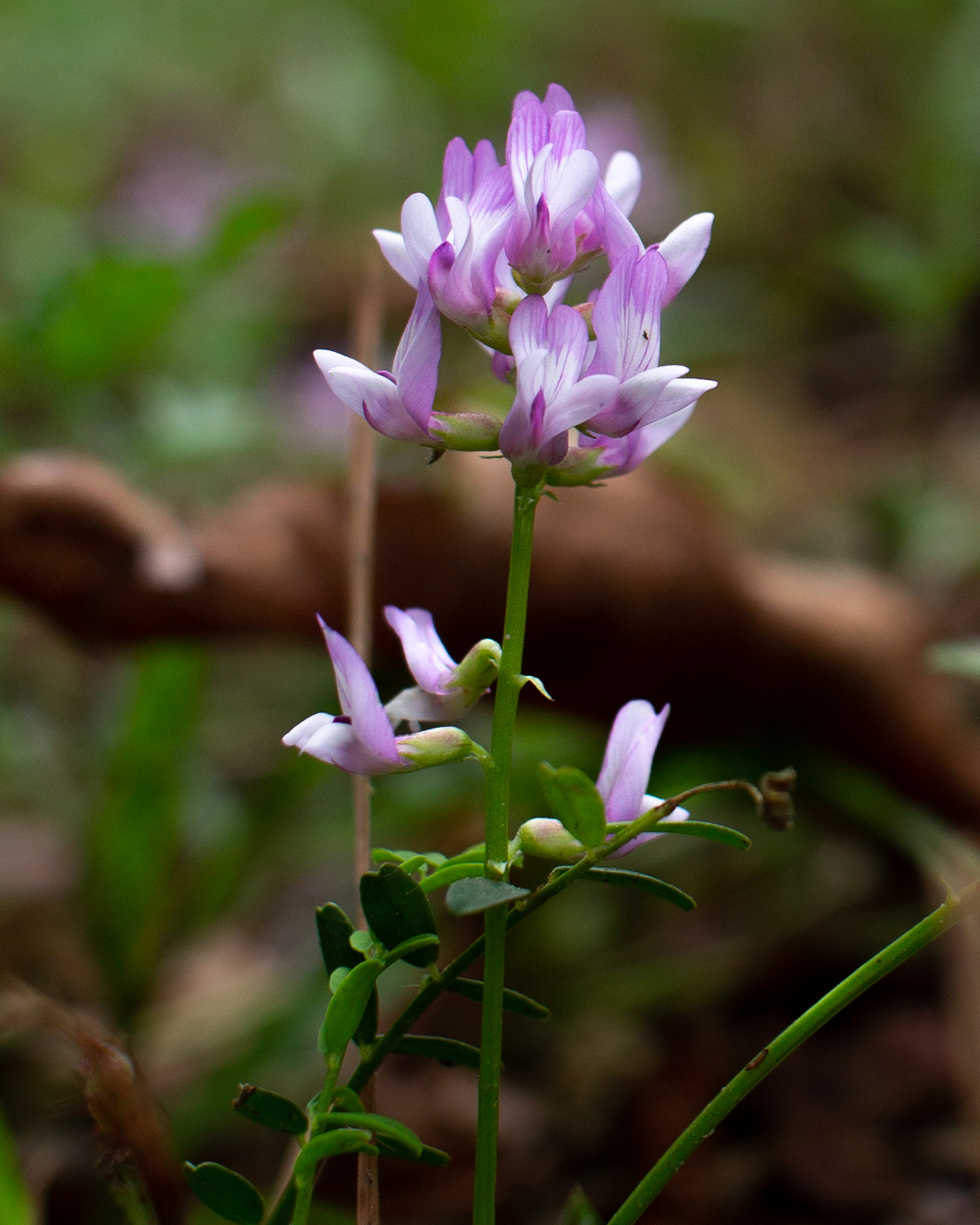

Conservation status
- Secure (NatureServe)

Scientific classification
- Kingdom: Plantae
- Clade: Tracheophytes
- Clade: Angiosperms
- Clade: Eudicots
- Clade: Rosids
- Order: Fabales
- Family: Fabaceae
- Subfamily: Faboideae
- Genus: Astragalus
- Species: A. distortus

Binomial name
- Astragalus distortus Torr. & A.Gray

= Astragalus distortus =

Species of legume

Astragalus distortus is a species of flowering plant in the legume family known by the common name Ozark milkvetch. It is found in the central United States. Missouri has a wide distribution of this plant, but is uncommon or absent in the northwestern and southeastern sections of the state. The species is subdivided into two varieties, neither of which is particularly common. There is no vine on the plant in Missouri, and it has small, purple inflorescences (though they are sometimes white). Identifying characteristics include its small size, non-vining habit, and its inflorescences. It is a perennial herb. Its habitats include prairies and savannas.
