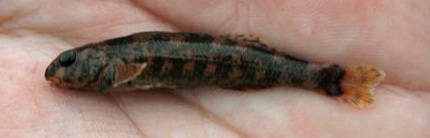
- Etheostoma histrio

Conservation status
- Least Concern (IUCN 3.1)

Scientific classification
- Kingdom: Animalia
- Phylum: Chordata
- Class: Actinopterygii
- Order: Perciformes
- Family: Percidae
- Genus: Etheostoma
- Species: E. histrio

Binomial name
- Etheostoma histrio D. S. Jordan & C. H. Gilbert, 1887

= Harlequin darter =

Species of fish

The harlequin darter (Etheostoma histrio) is a species of ray-finned fish, a darter from the subfamily Etheostomatinae, part of the family Percidae which includes the perches, ruffes and pike-perches. It is endemic to the eastern half of the United States.

== Description ==
This species can reach 7.7 cm (3.0 in) in total length, though most only reach about 5.3 cm (2.1 in). The harlequin darter displays a green coloration on its sides, with six or seven brown saddles present along the top of the body. The belly of this darter is generally a yellow or tan color with dark blotches present, and the base of the caudal peduncle and caudal fin show a B shape. The first dorsal fin is characterized by being clear with a red boundary. The other fins are mostly dark, with many dark blotches. Males and females of this species look similar except during the breeding season, when males display a much brighter green color than females. Nuptial tubercles in this species are absent. The name harlequin darter refers to mask-like pigmentation on the face, consisting of a suborbital bar and dark blotching on the head, breast, and body.

== Distribution ==
The harlequin darter was first recorded in the Ouachita River in Arkansas and the Poteau River in Oklahoma. Since then, knowledge of its geographic range has expanded to include the majority of the Southeast and the tributaries of the lower Mississippi River. This species is found from Illinois, south to Florida and as far west as Texas. The majority of the harlequin darter's population is found south of the Fall Line; however, the northernmost record of this species occurred within the Embarras River, which is a tributary of the Wabash River of Illinois. Within Tennessee, the harlequin darter only occurs in the western portion of the state, within the Mississippi River and western Tennessee River tributaries. The extent of the harlequin darter's range is believed to be underestimated due to its preferred habitat type. The harlequin darter prefers areas full of woody debris in large, fast-moving bodies of water, requiring special sampling methods and likely resulting in a high degree of sampling error. It has been removed from the Indiana list of endangered species after unknown populations were found. In addition, known populations within the Wabash River drainage in Indiana have been noticeably increasing. This species is only found in one watershed, the Escambia, in Florida. Due to the limited occurrence of this species in Florida, it is particularly vulnerable to catastrophic events within this limited range. It was further cut off from other nearby populations by the building of dams in Alabama. The harlequin darter is fairly widely distributed, but is largely uncommon within its range.

== Ecology ==
The diet of the harlequin darter consists of benthic invertebrates, including larvae from midges, caddisflies, mayflies, and blackflies. Ecological specialization is one of the top reasons darters have such an incredible amount of diversity. Within its range, the harlequin darter prefers moderate- to fast-flowing riffles with fairly high water quality conditions; but what sets it apart is its dependence on detritus and downed woody debris. It is one of the few darter species reliably found within the main channel of the Mississippi River, and it often avoids smaller streams. Agricultural runoff tends to accumulate heavily into these large water bodies, greatly increasing nitrate and phosphate levels, creating an unfavorable environment for these darters. Also, companies along these larger bodies of water tend to remove vegetation and woody debris in riparian zones, further negatively affecting the harlequin darter.

== Lifecycle ==
Harlequin darters spawn once in February or March. The female seeks out an appropriate nesting site as the male follows. Snags or downed woody debris usually serve as prime nesting habitats for this species. When the eggs are released, they attach to detritus within deep water at the nesting site. Sexual maturity of females occurs at one year of age. The fecundity of this species has a broad range, from 90 to 450 eggs being produced, depending on age of the female. The maximum lifespan of this species is four years. This species is believed to participate in a relatively high amount of seasonal movement. Late spring through fall are generally spent in smaller streams, and during the colder months, movement occurs into larger reservoirs and other large bodies of water. After spawning, the adults are thought to move away from large bodies of water into smaller streams, leaving behind the young of the year in the large rivers and reservoirs for the rest of that year. During sampling efforts, in areas where adults were reliably caught in the winter, only young of that year's harlequin darters were caught that May in the same water bodies. So dams and other barriers to movement may be negatively affecting the lifecycle of this species. It is probably further being negatively affected by removal of downed woody debris within the water bodies preferred for spawning beds.

== Management ==
Currently, management for this species is lacking in most areas. Sampling for this species is difficult, resulting in a lack of population data throughout its range. However, the harlequin darter is not considered a federally endangered or threatened species. Few states have management plans in place for this species. The Missouri Department of Conservation, one of the few that have developed best management practices for the harlequin darter, restricts the dates when work can be done near wetlands to protect harlequin darter breeding, leaves vegetation and woody debris in water bodies, puts up sediment controls such as silt fences, avoids the use of permanent dams that restrict movement, and avoids stream crossings by using culverts or detouring routes that cross streams where the harlequin darter resides. A biological status review conducted in Florida determined many of the same management problems, including woody debris removal, damming water bodies, turbidity, and sediment loads lead to the decrease in harlequin darter numbers. This review also listed oil and coal exploration as potential threats to the success of this species. However, no direct management plan has been formed for the Florida population of harlequin darters. This is notable, considering the harlequin darter is considered a species of special concern within Florida.

== Recommendations ==
The harlequin darter exhibits some degree of seasonal movement, going from large rivers into smaller tributaries for part of the year, so the removal of dams and other dispersal barriers would benefit this species. This species also relies heavily on woody, organic debris over sandy bottoms. Management for this species should include limiting removal of vegetation and downed woody debris in and around water bodies where this species is found. Furthermore, because this species relies on a habitat difficult to properly sample, extra sampling efforts should be undertaken within its range to determine the actual population numbers for this species. In addition, nonpoint source pollution and agricultural runoff may be negatively affecting this species. Using best management practices and streamside management zones could alleviate this problem and increase the health of water bodies, not only for the harlequin darter, but for most other aquatic species present, as well. Enforcing the use of silt fences around areas of construction would reduce the sedimentation. Also, encouraging landowners to use the conservation reserve program through the United States Department of Agriculture would not only reduce soil erosion and improve water quality, but would also benefit the human population by enhancing groundwater recharge and reducing potential flood damage.
