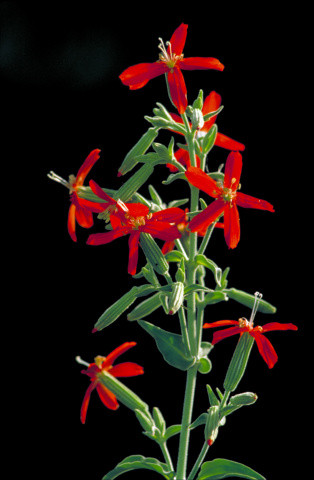

Conservation status
- Vulnerable (NatureServe)

Scientific classification
- Kingdom: Plantae
- Clade: Tracheophytes
- Clade: Angiosperms
- Clade: Eudicots
- Order: Caryophyllales
- Family: Caryophyllaceae
- Genus: Silene
- Species: S. regia

Binomial name
- Silene regia Sims

= Silene regia =

Species of flowering plant

Silene regia is a species of flowering plant in the family Caryophyllaceae known by the common name royal catchfly. It is native to the central United States. It is a perennial herb that grows from a fleshy taproot and has several upright stems growing up to 1.6 meters (5 ft 3 in) tall. The leaves are lance-shaped to oval and up to 12 centimeters (4.7 in) long, becoming smaller higher up the stem. The inflorescence is an array of flowers at the top of the stem. The elongate tubular calyx of sepals is up to 2.5 centimeters (0.98 in) long and has 10 longitudinal veins. The lobes of the bright red corolla are 1 to 2 centimeters (0.39 to 0.79 in) long.

The flowers are pollinated by the ruby-throated hummingbird. This plant is similar to the other two red-flowered eastern North American Silene, S. virginica and S. rotundifolia.

This plant is native to the tallgrass prairie of the American Midwest. It occurs in grassland and woodland. It has been found on roadsides and outcrops, and in pastures. It is found in open, sunny spots. It is located in the states of Kansas, Oklahoma, Arkansas, Missouri, Illinois, Indiana, Ohio, Kentucky, Tennessee, Georgia, Florida and Alabama. It has been extirpated from Kansas and Tennessee and is rare throughout most of the rest of its range. Silene regia is state-listed in Ohio as a threatened species. It may be most prevalent in Missouri. Populations of Silene regia in Missouri and Arkansas (western range) show higher genetic diversity than those in Indiana and Alabama (Eastern Range). There’s little gene flow among distant populations, showing that fragmentation has caused strong genetic differences.population size and geographic isolation strongly and directly influence the amount of genetic variation in this rare prairie species.

The main threat to the species is the loss of habitat to agricultural use. Its native prairie habitat has been reduced so that now the plant mainly grows on roadsides and rights-of-way. It is also threatened by fire suppression, which eliminates the normal fire regime that keeps the habitat open and sunny. Larger and woody vegetation moves into the habitat when fire is reduced, and the Silene cannot compete.
