= Carex arkansana =

Scientific classification
- Kingdom: Plantae
- Clade: Tracheophytes
- Clade: Angiosperms
- Clade: Monocots
- Clade: Commelinids
- Order: Poales
- Family: Cyperaceae
- Genus: Carex
- Species: C. arkansana

Binomial name
- Carex arkansana (L.H.Bailey) L.H.Bailey

Species of plant

Carex arkansana is a tussock-forming species of perennial sedge in the family Cyperaceae. It is native to central parts of the United States.

The sedge has no obvious rhizomes. It has 5 to 60 cm (2.0 to 23.6 in) long culms that are 1.4 to 2 mm (0.055 to 0.079 in) wide at the base thinning to 0.7 to 0.9 mm (0.028 to 0.035 in) at long projections that are wider than they are long. The leaf blade is usually 1 to 1.25 mm (0.039 to 0.049 in) in width. The inflorescences are composed of three to six spikes that are 1.5 to 4 cm (0.59 to 1.57 in) long and 7 to 12 mm (0.28 to 0.47 in) wide.

The species was first described by the botanist Liberty Hyde Bailey in 1896 as a part of the Botanical Gazette. It has one synonym; Carex rosea var. arkansana also described by Bailey.

The plant grows in temperate biomes in the central United States from Illinois in the north to Texas in the south.

== See also ==
- List of Carex species
