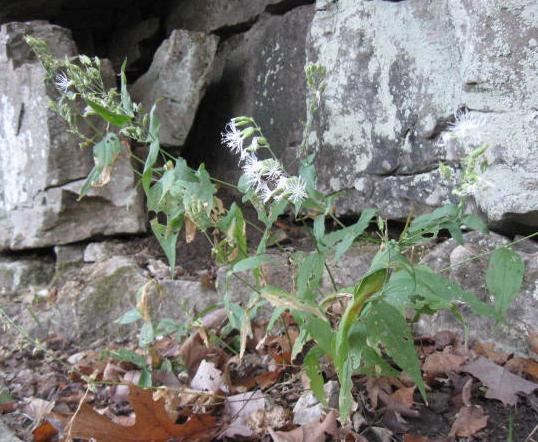
- Silene ovata in flower

Conservation status
- Vulnerable (NatureServe)

Scientific classification
- Kingdom: Plantae
- Clade: Tracheophytes
- Clade: Angiosperms
- Clade: Eudicots
- Order: Caryophyllales
- Family: Caryophyllaceae
- Genus: Silene
- Species: S. ovata

Binomial name
- Silene ovata Pursh.

= Silene ovata =

Species of plant

Silene ovata, the Blue Ridge catchfly or ovate-leaved catchfly, is a herbaceous plant in the family Caryophyllaceae. It is a perennial plant growing up to 1.5 m (4 ft 11 in) tall, that has numerous white flowers, each finely fringed with a tube. It has large opposite leaves without petioles, which are 5–12 cm (2.0–4.7 in) long and taper to a long point, and 2–5 cm (0.79–1.97 in) wide.

== Flowering ==
Jones lists the blooming season as from June to September.

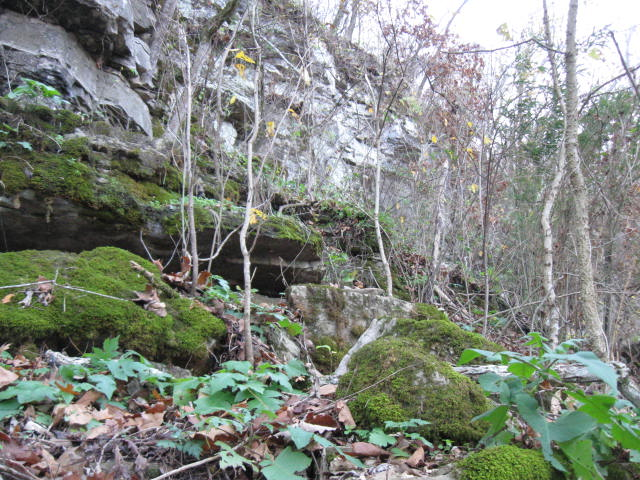
Habitat for ovate-leaved catchfly on the Sylamore District of the Ozark National Forest. Plants are in the middle of the photo, but occur on the adjoining bluffs and lower talus.

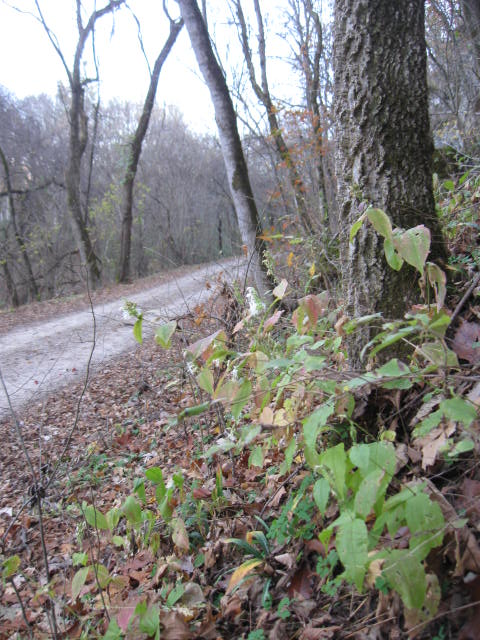
Roadside habitat and ovate-leaved catchfly plant at the same location as other photos

== Range ==
While unknown in Florida, it occurs in most of the southeastern United States from Georgia, eight widely scattered Alabama counties, to Mississippi and Arkansas (where it occurs only in eight counties in the Ozark region), north into southern Illinois and Indiana, Kentucky, and Virginia. The plants have a limited distribution range wide as indicated by their global G3 status.

== Habitat ==
A flora of Kentucky lists the species as occurring in "dry to mesic forests" while the flora of North Carolina lists the habitat as "rich woods."

== Chromosome count ==
2n = 48.

== Conservation status ==
Silene ovata is listed as G3 on the NatureServe conservation status, meaning it is vulnerable and globally rare. Typically G3 species have 21 to 100 occurrences globally, or have 3,000 to 10,000 individuals globally.

- Alabama S2.
- Arkansas S3, Threatened.
- Georgia
- Illinois
- Indiana
- Kentucky S3, Threatened.
- North Carolina
- Tennessee
- South Carolina
- Virginia
