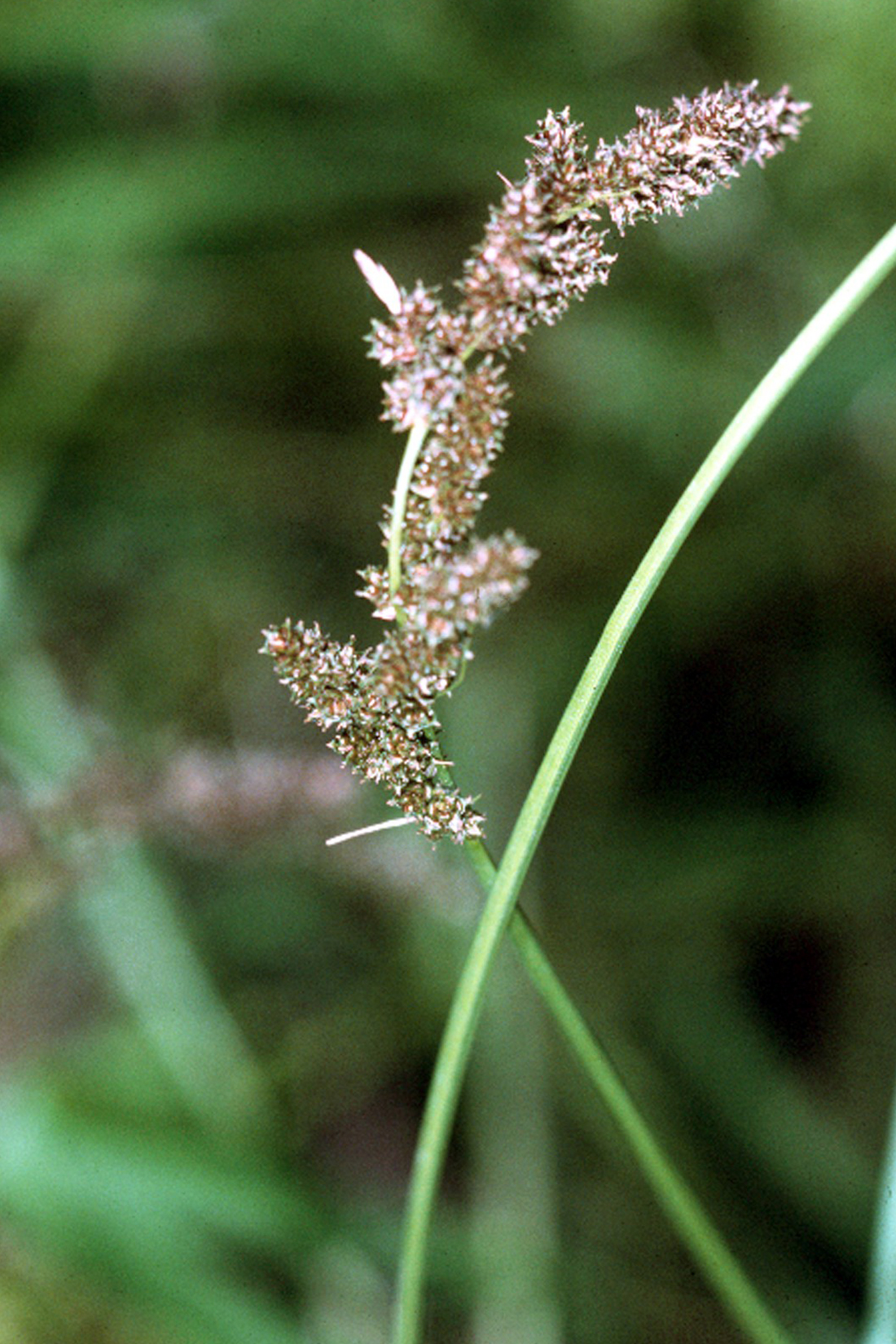
- Inflorescence
- Botanical illustration

Conservation status
- Vulnerable (NatureServe)

Scientific classification
- Kingdom: Plantae
- Clade: Tracheophytes
- Clade: Angiosperms
- Clade: Monocots
- Clade: Commelinids
- Order: Poales
- Family: Cyperaceae
- Genus: Carex
- Species: C. decomposita

Binomial name
- Carex decomposita Muhl.

Synonyms
- Carex paniculata var. decomposita (Muhl.) Dewey

= Carex decomposita =

Species of plant

Carex decomposita, the cypressknee sedge, is a species of flowering plant in the family Cyperaceae. It is native to low-lying wetlands of the south-central and eastern United States. A rhizomatous perennial from 5 to 120 cm (2 to 47 in) tall, as its common name suggests it is typically found growing around the bases (and knees) of cypress (Taxodium) trees or buttonbush (Cephalanthus occidentalis) shrubs at elevations from 0 to 300 m (0 to 1,000 ft).
