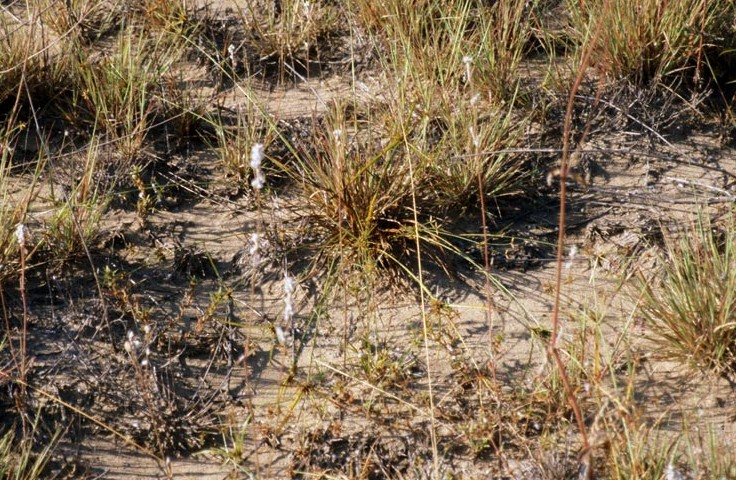

Conservation status
- Vulnerable (NatureServe)

Scientific classification
- Kingdom: Plantae
- Clade: Tracheophytes
- Clade: Angiosperms
- Clade: Monocots
- Clade: Commelinids
- Order: Poales
- Family: Cyperaceae
- Genus: Cyperus
- Species: C. grayoides

Binomial name
- Cyperus grayoides Mohlenbr.

= Cyperus grayoides =

Mohlenbrock's umbrella sedge

Species of plant

Cyperus grayoides is a species of sedge known as Illinois flatsedge and Mohlenbrock's umbrella sedge. It is endemic to the United States, where its distribution extends from Illinois through Missouri and Arkansas to Texas and Louisiana.

This perennial herb grows from a network of tuberous rhizomes, producing clumps of triangular stems up to 35 to 48 centimeters tall. The gray-green leaves are up to 25 centimeters long. The inflorescence is a cluster of several rounded spikes containing many spikelets.

This plant grows in sandy habitat such as dunes and sandy prairies. It can occasionally be seen on roadsides. It is adapted to the periodic disturbance which occurs due to wind and erosion in habitat such as dunes.

This plant is often common where it occurs. However, its habitat is threatened by development and degradation. The loss of a normal fire regime is a threat because it is an important vector of natural disturbance that the plant relies on. Grazing and sand mining are also threats.
