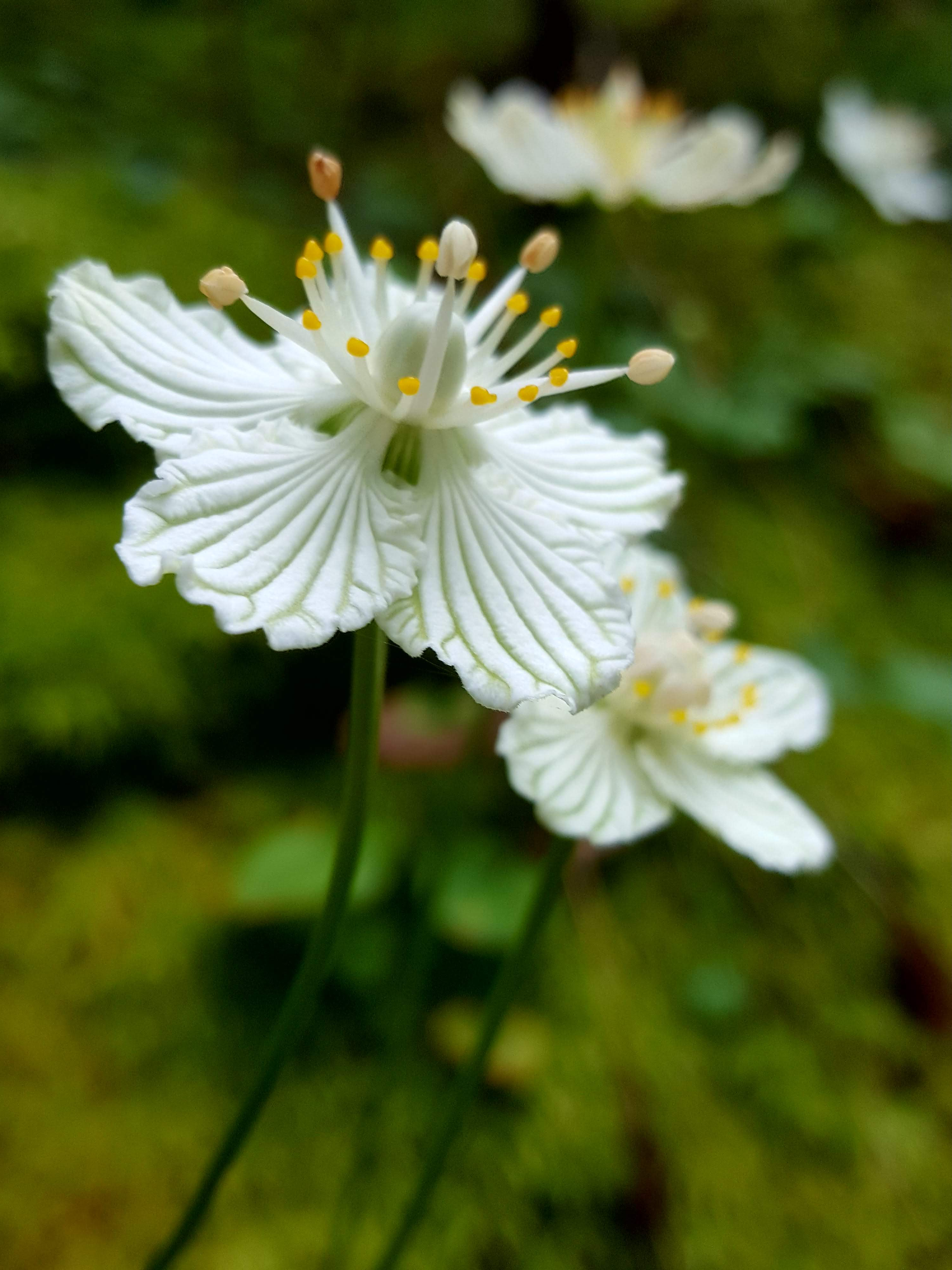

Conservation status
- Vulnerable (NatureServe)

Scientific classification
- Kingdom: Plantae
- Clade: Tracheophytes
- Clade: Angiosperms
- Clade: Eudicots
- Clade: Rosids
- Order: Celastrales
- Family: Celastraceae
- Genus: Parnassia
- Species: P. caroliniana

Binomial name
- Parnassia caroliniana Michx. 1803

Synonyms
- Parnassia floridana Rydb.

= Parnassia caroliniana =

Species of flowering plant

Parnassia caroliniana is a species of flowering plant in the Celastraceae known by the common name Carolina grass of Parnassus. It is native to the southeastern United States, where it occurs in North Carolina and South Carolina, with an isolated population in the Florida Panhandle.

This rhizomatous perennial herb grows up to 65 centimeters (26 inches) tall. The basal leaves have rounded to oval blades borne on long petioles and leaves on the stem are heart-shaped and clasp the stem at their bases. The inflorescence is a solitary flower with five deeply veined white petals which may exceed 2 centimeters (0.8 inches) in length. At the center are five stamens with yellow anthers and five three-parted staminodes. The fruit is a capsule, which dehisces to drop seeds. Unlike Parnassia grandifolia, the pistil of P. caroliniana is white and the staminodes are apiculate, while the petals broaden at points closer to their base than is seen in P. grandifolia.

Parnassia caroliniana grows in moist areas in a variety of habitat types, including flatwoods, savannas, bogs, and the ecotones between pocosins and savannas or swamps and savannas. On the coastal plain the plant can be found on sandy calcareous substrates with peat. Common pine tree associates include longleaf pine and slash pine, while the plant prefers grassy areas with an open canopy. Today these may be found near pine plantations. Other plants in the habitat may include Andropogon virginicus, A. glomeratus, Aristida stricta, Arundinaria tecta, Centella asiatica, Ctenium aromaticum, Dichromena sp., Erigeron vernus, Eryngium integrifolium, Eupatorium rotundifolium, E. leucolepis, E. pilosum, Fothergilla gardenii, Gaylussacia frondosa, Gentiana pennelliana, Helenium pinnatifidum, Ilex glabra, Lorinseria areolata, Lyonia lucida, Pinus serotina, Platanthera ciliaris, P. cristata, Pteridium aquilinum, Ptilimnium capillaceum, Pycnanthemum flexuosum, Rhexia alifanus, Sarracenia flava, S. purpurea, Taxodium ascendens and Vaccinium crassifolium.

Flowering occurs from the end of September through the beginning of November. Hoverflies, other Diptera and beetles are attracted to the flowers.

The main threats to the species come from activities related to timber, such as logging, planting of seedlings, and ditching. Once trees are established, fire suppression is practiced in the area. This prevents a natural fire regime that would normally keep the forests and woodlands clear of brush and maintain an open canopy. The land is also drained, making it too dry to support the plant. Land is also lost in the conversion to residential and commercial development.

This plant is being conserved at Moores Creek National Battlefield in North Carolina, where wetland rehabilitation is in progress.
