= R. lutea =

R. lutea may refer to:

- Reseda lutea, a herbaceous plant
- Retama lutea, a flowering bush
- Rhagonycha lutea, a soldier beetle
- Rhexia lutea, a dicotyledonous plant
- Rhingia lutea, a hoverfly with a long snout
- Rhipidarctia lutea, a Congolese moth
- Rosa lutea, a rose native to Georgia
- Roscoea lutea, a perennial plant
- Russula lutea, an edible mushroom
