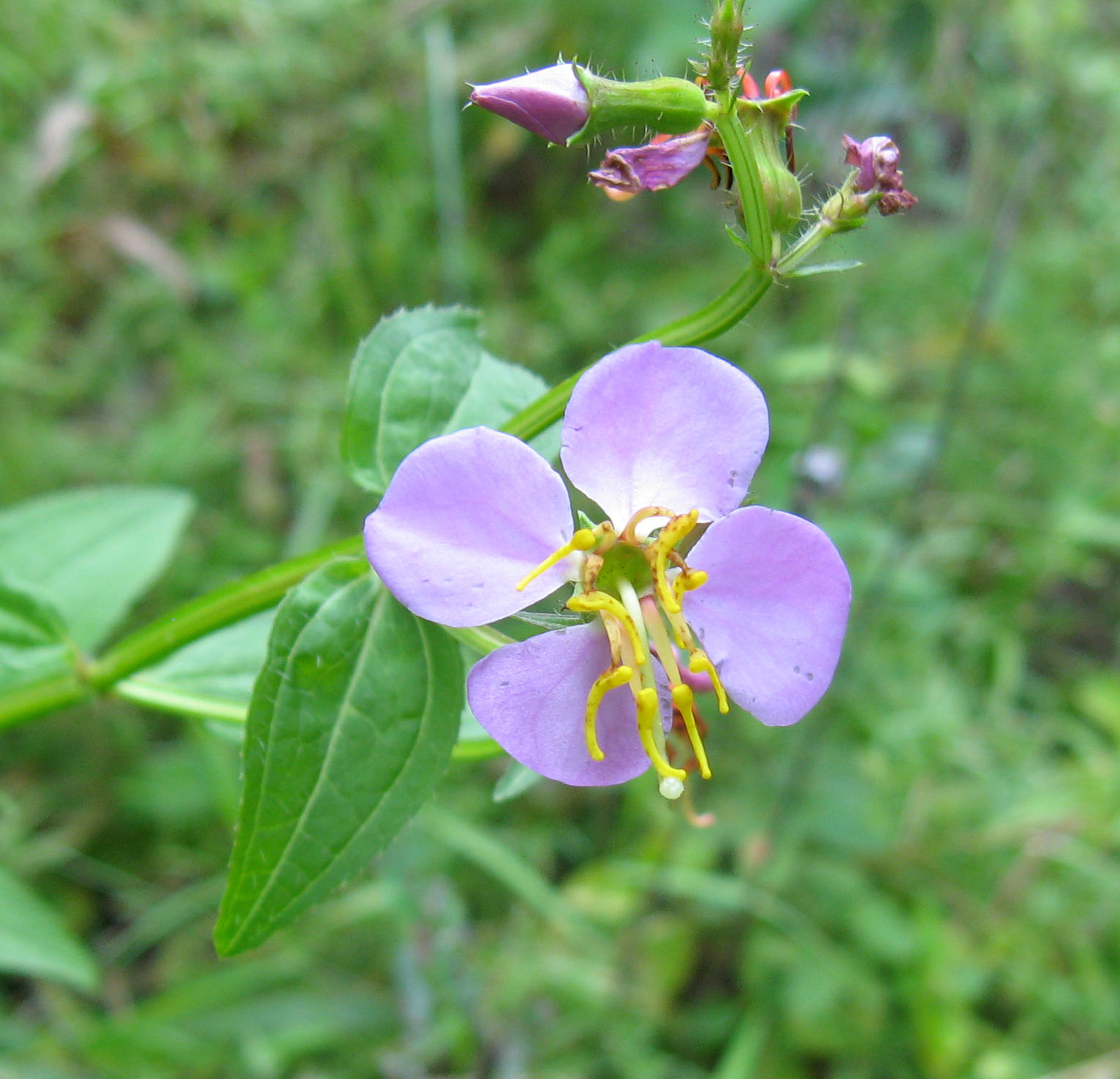

Conservation status
- Least Concern (IUCN 3.1)

Scientific classification
- Kingdom: Plantae
- Clade: Embryophytes
- Clade: Tracheophytes
- Clade: Angiosperms
- Clade: Eudicots
- Clade: Rosids
- Order: Myrtales
- Family: Melastomataceae
- Genus: Rhexia
- Species: R. virginica

Binomial name
- Rhexia virginica L.

= Rhexia virginica =

Species of flowering plant

Rhexia virginica, the handsome Harry or Virginia meadow-beauty, is a species of flowering plant in the family Melastomataceae. It is native to much of eastern North America, and is often found in moist, often acidic soils in open areas.

== Description ==
This species is a perennial herb that is easily identified by its distinctly angled stems. It produces purple-pink flowers in the summer that use buzz pollination for reproduction.

The leaves of R. virginica are oppositely arranged, and may be elliptic or ovate in shape. They may reach a length of 7 centimeters (approximately 2.75 inches) and a width of 2.6 centimeters (approximately 1 inch). Stems may reach up to 9 decimeters (approximately 35 inches) in height.

== Distribution and habitat ==
R. virginica has been found in eastern US from Florida to Maine, and north to Ontario and Nova Scotia.

It has been observed in habitat types such as savannas, flatwoods, and wet ditches.

== Gallery ==
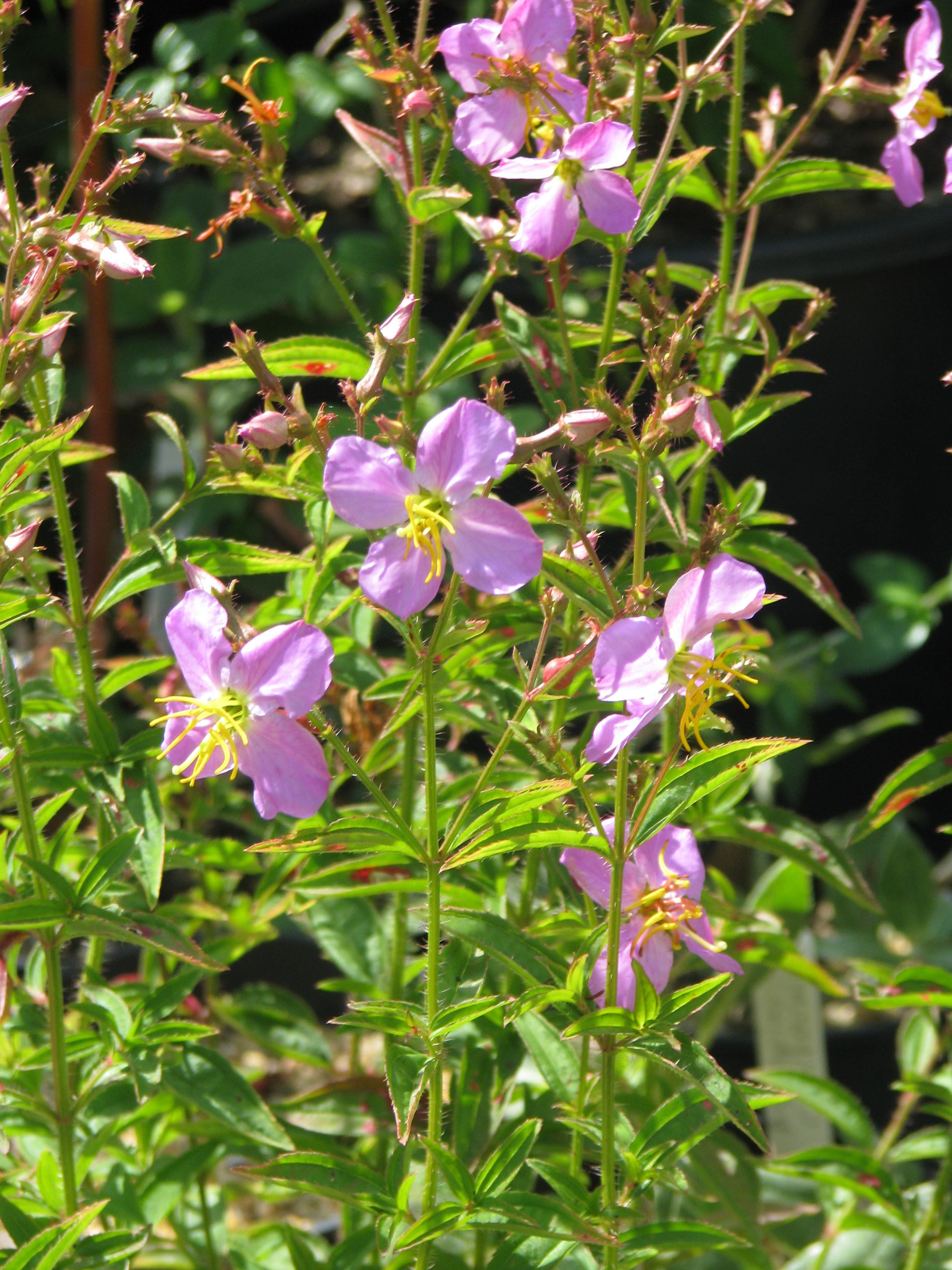

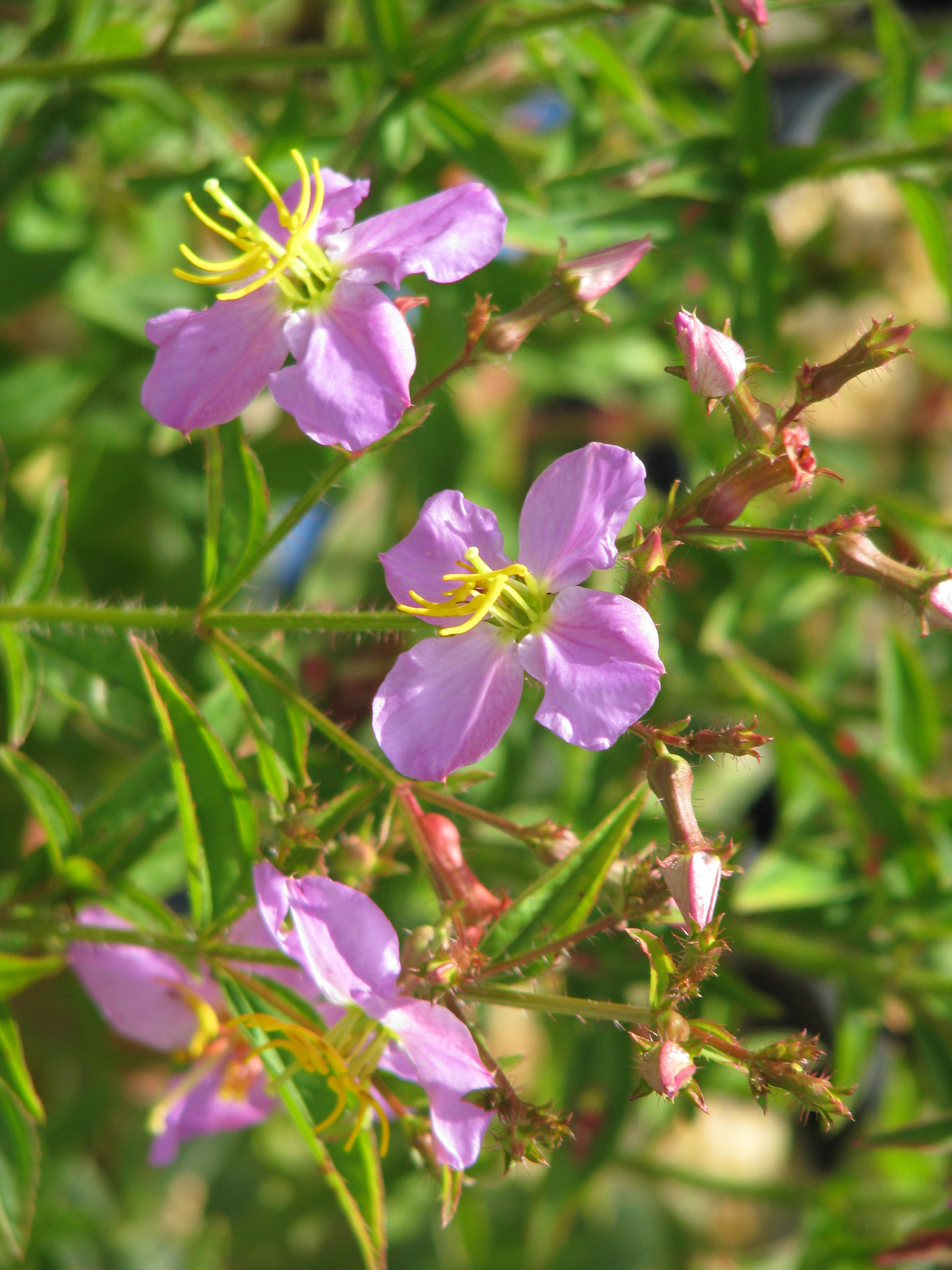

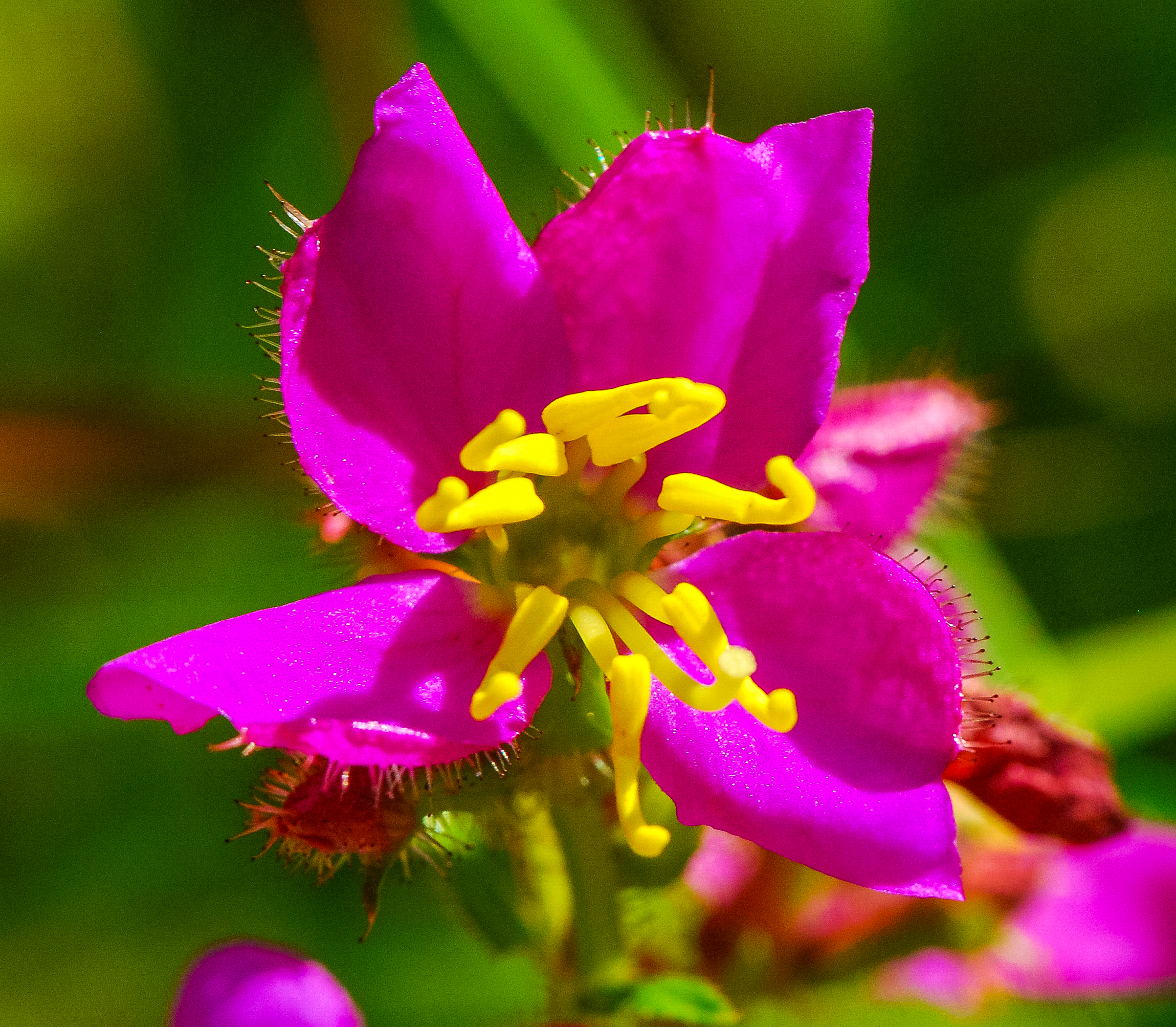

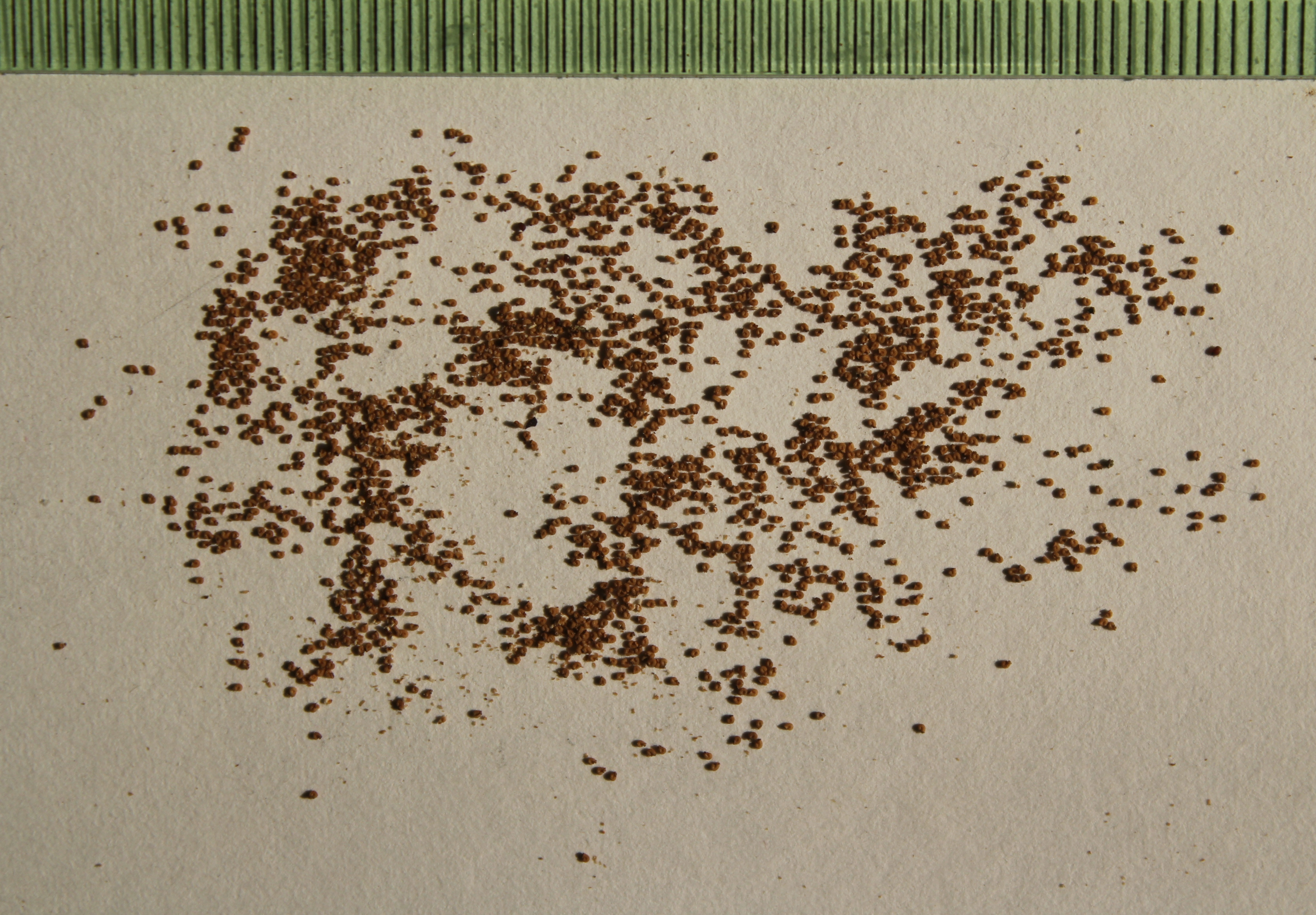
Seeds

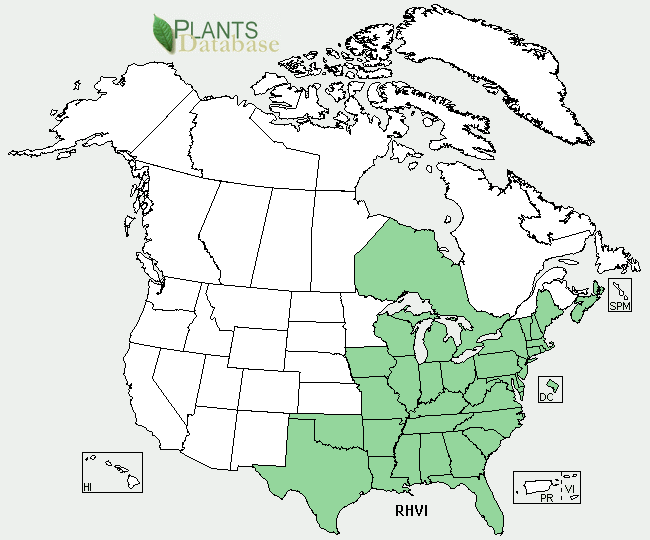
Distribution map
