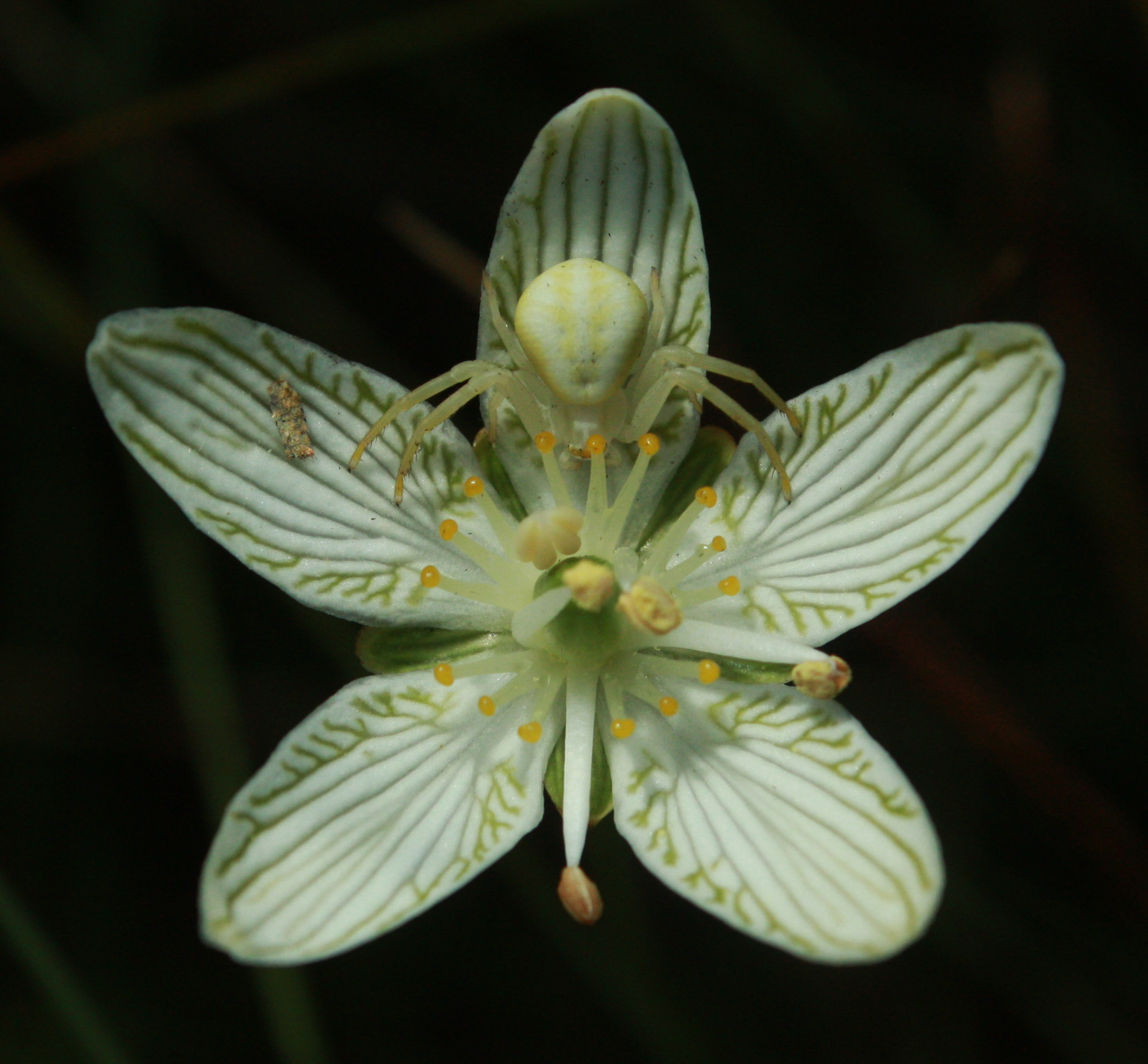
- Parnassia glauca flower with a crab spider in Quebec, Canada.

Scientific classification
- Kingdom: Plantae
- Clade: Tracheophytes
- Clade: Angiosperms
- Clade: Eudicots
- Clade: Rosids
- Order: Celastrales
- Family: Celastraceae
- Genus: Parnassia
- Species: P. glauca

Binomial name
- Parnassia glauca Raf.

Synonyms
- Parnassia americana Muhl.

= Parnassia glauca =

Species of plant

Parnassia glauca, also known as fen grass of Parnassus, is a flowering herb of the genus Parnassia.

== Distribution and habitat ==
The native distribution of P. glauca includes the northeastern United States and southeastern Canada. Natural habitats for this plant include fens, wetland edges, and the shores and floodplains of rivers and lakes. It is typically found in basic soils (soils that have a high pH).

== Description ==
The flower of P. glauca is 5-merous, with five petals and five sepals. Five sterile stamens are also present, with each divided into three prongs near its base, giving the flower the appearance of having 15 sterile stamens. A small yellow spherical structure, mimicking a drop of nectar, tops each sterile stamen branch. Each of the five white petals features green veins that may serve as guides for pollinators. Leaves are simple, with entire margins, and are found only at the base of the plant. The fruit is a dry capsule that splits open upon ripening.
