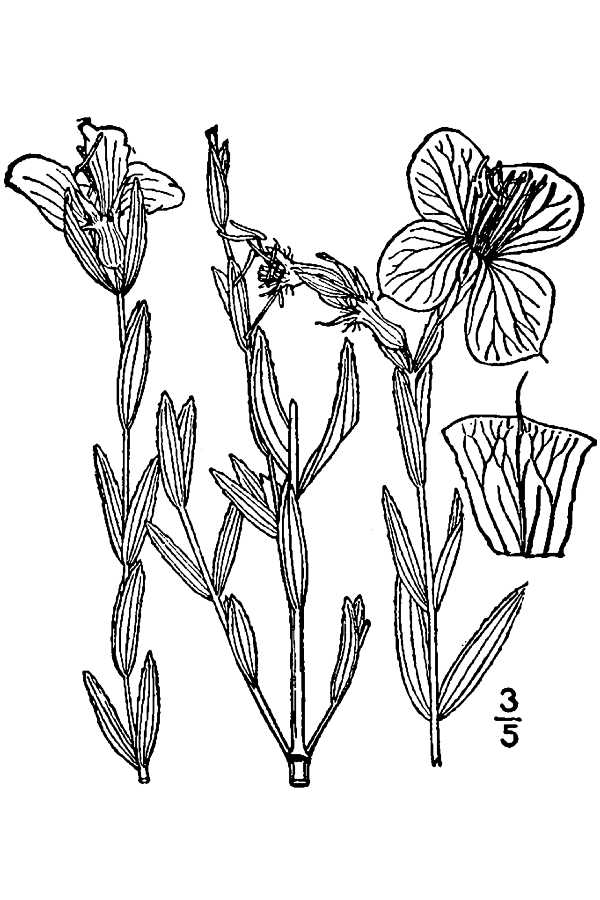
- 1913 illustration

Conservation status
- Vulnerable (NatureServe)

Scientific classification
- Kingdom: Plantae
- Clade: Tracheophytes
- Clade: Angiosperms
- Clade: Eudicots
- Clade: Rosids
- Order: Myrtales
- Family: Melastomataceae
- Genus: Rhexia
- Species: R. aristosa

Binomial name
- Rhexia aristosa Britton

= Rhexia aristosa =

Species of flowering plant

Rhexia aristosa Britton is a species of flowering plants known by the common name Awned Meadow Beauty. R. aristosa Britton was named after the man who described it, Nathaniel Lord Britton an American botanist, was sent a species of R. aristosa by Rev. J.E. Peters and collected by E.H. Kilmer and J.C. Gifford. R. aristosa Britton is a perennial herbaceous plant in the family Melastomataceae, native to the southeastern United States. Rhexia features four flower petals that vary from pink to lavender, erect stems, narrow leaves, and eight curved stamens. The species generally grows in wetland environments, including Carolina bays, depression meadows, pond margins, and wet pine savannas. Rhexia is found in scattered populations across parts of the Atlantic and Gulf Coastal Plains. The plant reproduces through both seeds and vegetative growth, and its pollination is primarily associated with bumblebees. Because it depends on specialized wetland habitats, Rhexia aristosa is vulnerable to habitat alteration and other environmental disturbances.

== Taxonomy ==
The awned meadowbeauty (Rhexia aristosa Britton) is a flowering plant in the family Melastomataceae and the genus Rhexia. Its taxonomic classification, as recorded by the Integrated Information System (ITIS), places in the kingdom Plantae, subkingdom Viridiplantae, infrakingdom Streptophyta, superdivision Embryophyta, division Tracheophyta, subdivision Spermatophytina, class Magnoliopsida, superorder Rosanae, order Myrtales, and family Melastomataceae. The species is classified within the genus Rhexia, commonly known as meadowbeauties. ITIS recognizes Rhexia aristosa Britton as an accepted species name and lists both awned meadowbeauty and awnpetal meadowbeauty as English common names.

== Description ==
Rhexia aristosa Britton or awned meadow beauty is a 40-70cm tall perennial herb. There are four petals per flower, and the petals appear a purple or pinkish color. The center of the flower features eight stamens with curved yellow anthers. Along the stem, but mainly concentrated around the neck, of the awned meadow beauty there are yellowish hairs that are stiff and thin. The leaves along the plant are 2.54 cm long and 1.27 cm wide. Leaves are lanceolate like and come to a spear-like point. The plant's seeds are small, about 0.7mm in size, and have irregular concentric ridges. It flowers in the late summer from June until August.

== Distribution and habitat ==
Rhexia aristosa occurs throughout parts of the southeastern United States. The plants populations range from New Jersey south to Alabama. The species has been recorded in Alabama, Delaware, Georgia, North Carolina, New Jersey, and South Carolina. The plant is most often associated with wet environments, such as Carolina bays, wet meadows, pond edges, cypress flats, and open, damp woodlands. It can also grow in environments such as vernal pools and shallow ponds. It generally thrives in moist, sandy soil, especially in habitats that are in close proximity to rivers and other waterways. The size of its populations can drastically vary depending on the location of the plant. In North Carolina, plants are often spread out, with fewer than 1,000 recorded at a one site. However, some locations in South Carolina and New Jersey have much larger populations, sometimes reaching around 50,000 plants. Changes in local water conditions is one factor that affects where the species grow and how abundant it is.

== Reproduction, ecology, and uses ==
Rhexia aristosa is a perennial herb that reproduces both sexually, through seeds, and vegetatively, through underground rhizomes and the sprouting of tubers. Its flowering period generally occurs from June through September. The flowers are primarily associated with bee pollination and have curved, bright yellow anthers that release pollen through small openings at their tips. In a process known as buzz pollination, bees grasp the anthers and vibrate their flight muscles, causing pollen to be released. After flowering, the plant develops urn-shaped floral tubes which form and contain numerous small seeds. The seeds are released through a small pore opening at the top. Seeds may be dispersed by gravity, water, and waterfowl. These seeds can remain in the soil for years, and only grow when fresh soil is exposed. When the plant reproduces asexually it does so via rhizomes, which spread underground producing new roots and flowering buds and by growing from tuber. Germination can occur when disturbances, such as fire or receding water levels, expose bare soil and create ideal conditions for growth.Rhexia aristosa is considered economically unimportant.It is primarily valued for its ability to support pollinators, support wildlife by providing food and shelter for small animals in wetland environments, its natural beauty, and contribution to plant diversity.

== Threats and cnservation ==
Rhexia aristosa faces a variety of threats including habitat loss and changes in wetland conditions. The draining and filling of wetlands, excessive groundwater removal for agricultural and urban use, and turning habitats into pine plantations are threats to the species survival. Fire suppression is another concern because wildfires help maintain suitable habitats and create open areas where seeds can germinate.The bays are also altered during logging operations. Additionally, when developing land it is crucial that ditching and draining the land is avoided, and that the soil is not compacted, or Rhexia aristosa's habitat is further damaged.

This species has a global conservation rank of G3G4, meaning it lies between the vulnerable and apparently secure classifications. In the state of Georgia, it is classified as S2, meaning it is imperiled and at risk. Population size can also fluctuate depending on water levels.

Rhexia aristosa is considered critically imperiled in 3 of the six states it is found in, with those being New Jersey, Delaware, and Alabama. In the remaining three states, the plant is imperiled in Georgia, and vulnerable in North and South Carolina. Out of 90 ranked populations, only 44 of them scored an A or a B, which have good viability, and 4-12 were ranked as having received proper protections.Additionally, the quantity of Rhexia aristosa found above ground does not indicate the health of the local population. Population seems to be trending downward, with the long-term pattern showing a population loss of 30-50%, and with Georgia only finding 11 populations of Rhexia aristosa out of the expected 30.

Conservation efforts focus on protecting wetland habitats and maintaining the environmental conditions needed for the species to survive. Some suggested conservation measures include preventing wetland drainage, limiting groundwater withdrawals, and allowing appropriate fores to spread. Protecting surrounding vegetation and soil disturbances also will contribute to the conservation of habitats where Rhexia aristosa thrives.

== Adaptations ==
One of its primary adaptations of the species to help handle habitats prone to wildfire and flooding is that its seeds can remain underground for years. The seeds will only sprout after wildfire or receding water levels, often caused by flooding, leave large sections of fresh soil exposed while being undamaged by flooding or fire.This also allows for Rhexia aristosa to grow without competition with woody plants which are unable to survive the flooding.

== Distribution and habitat ==
Rhexia aristosa occurs throughout parts of the southeastern United States. The plants populations range from New Jersey south to Alabama. The species has been recorded in Alabama, Delaware, Georgia, North Carolina, New Jersey, and South Carolina. The plant is most often associated with wet environments, such as Carolina bays, wet meadows, pond edges, cypress flats, and open, damp woodlands. It can also grow in environments such as vernal pools and shallow ponds. It can be found in ponds caused by limesink or depressions, as well as in Carolina bays and wet savannah habitats. In Alabama it was reported in Barbour Choctaw and Henry County. It generally thrives in moist, sandy soil, especially in habitats that are in close proximity to rivers and other waterways. The size of its populations can drastically vary depending on the location of the plant. In North Carolina, plants are often spread out, with fewer than 1,000 recorded at a one site. However, some locations in South Carolina and New Jersey have much larger populations, sometimes reaching around 50,000 plants. Changes in local water conditions is one factor that affects where the species grow and how abundant it is.

== Phylogenetic and related species ==
Other species found within the Rhexia genus are R. nuttalli that occurs in wet pine flatwoods and bogs in southeast Georgia, R. parviflora which is found in the margins of limesink ponds in southwest Georgia, R. salicifolia which lives in the drawdown zones of sandhill depression ponds in the coastal plain, and other similar species include R. cubensis found in the West Indies, R. marina found in Maryland, and R. nashii found in the southeastern United States. The genus Rhexia is believed to be a closely related to the genus Arthorostemma due to molecular evidence. Rhexia aristosa is considered a series B Rhexia due to the curve of its anthers, as well as their length. Rhexia aristosa was one of seven species of Rhexia to be classified as exclusively haploid, with six others being classified as either polyploids or as containing several cytotypes. The awned meadowbeauty is known to hybrid breed with other members of its genus; for example, R. aristosa with R. virginica.
