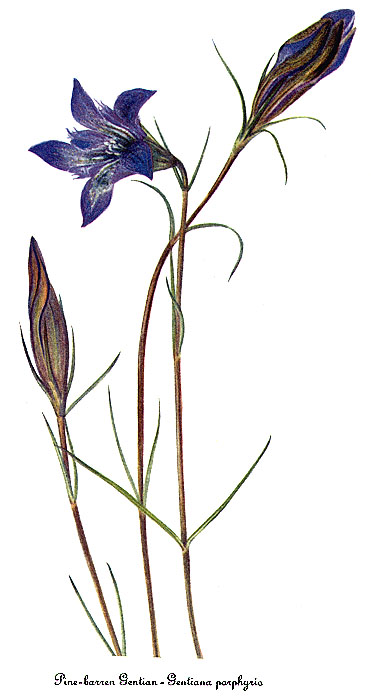
- Watercolor painting

Scientific classification
- Kingdom: Plantae
- Clade: Tracheophytes
- Clade: Angiosperms
- Clade: Eudicots
- Clade: Asterids
- Order: Gentianales
- Family: Gentianaceae
- Genus: Gentiana
- Species: G. autumnalis

Binomial name
- Gentiana autumnalis L.

= Gentiana autumnalis =

Species of plant

Gentiana autumnalis, the pine barren gentian, is a 1–2 ft (30–61 cm) tall species of flowering plant in the family Gentianaceae. It is native to eastern North America coastal pinebarrens from New Jersey to South Carolina.

== Taxonomy ==
There are two subspecies recognised:

- Gentiana autumnalis subsp. autumnalis L.
- Gentiana autumnalis subsp. pennelliana (Fernald) Halda - wiregrass gentian

== Threats ==
Fire suppression, invasive weeds, and the altering of natural water flows all pose threats to rare native populations of G. autumnalis.
