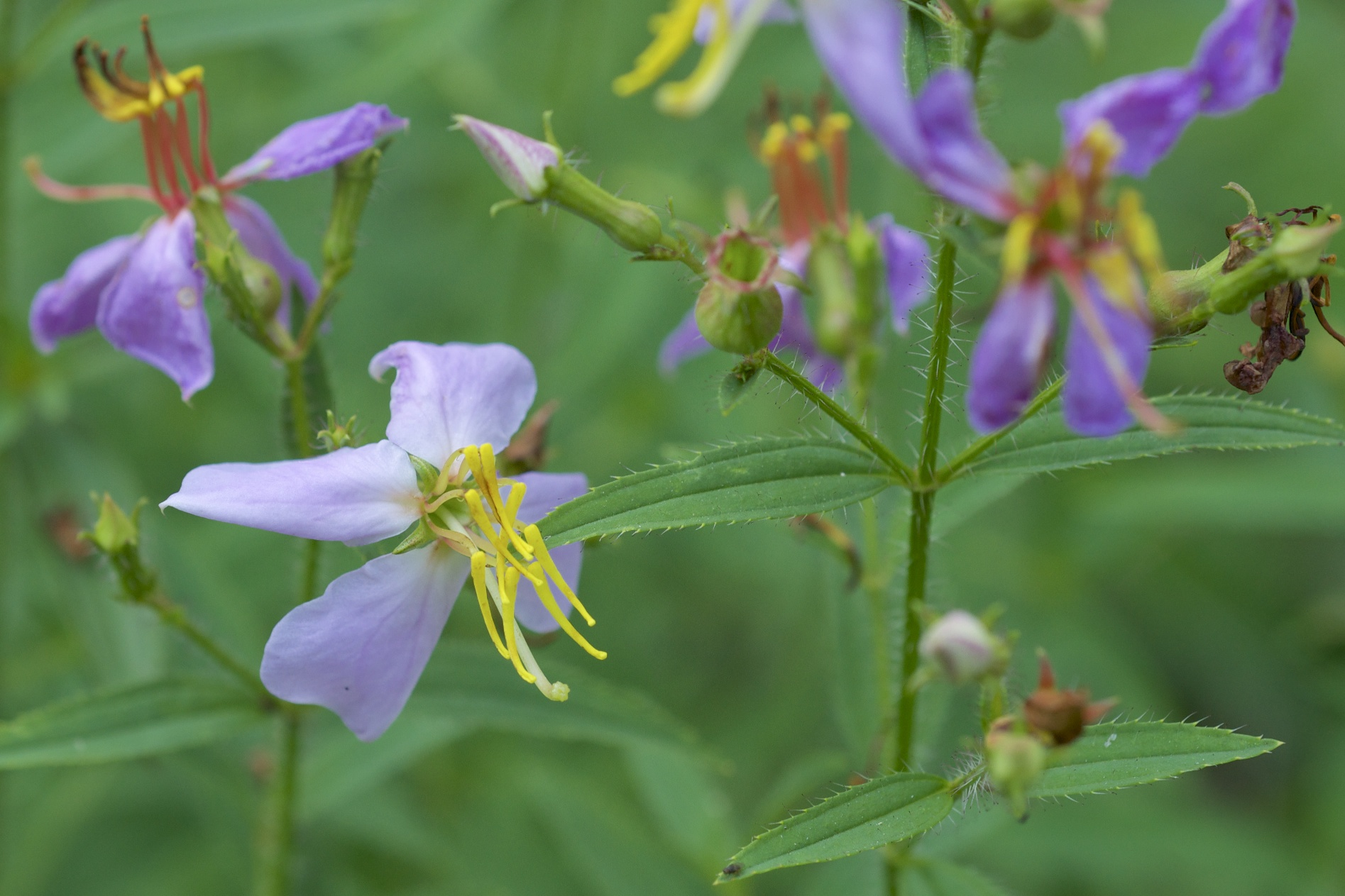

Conservation status
- Secure (NatureServe)

Scientific classification
- Kingdom: Plantae
- Clade: Embryophytes
- Clade: Tracheophytes
- Clade: Angiosperms
- Clade: Eudicots
- Clade: Rosids
- Order: Myrtales
- Family: Melastomataceae
- Genus: Rhexia
- Species: R. mariana

Binomial name
- Rhexia mariana L.

= Rhexia mariana =

Species of flowering plant

Rhexia mariana is a species of flowering plant in the Melastomataceae family known by the common names pale meadow beauty or Maryland meadowbeauty. It is native to the eastern and lower midwestern United States.

This species is a colonial perennial herb producing stems up to 2.5 feet (0.76 m) tall. The oppositely arranged leaves have elongated, toothed blades. The flower is 1 to 2 inches (25 to 51 mm) wide. It is pink, purple, or white with yellow or orange anthers. The fruit is a red urn-shaped capsule containing brownish seeds.

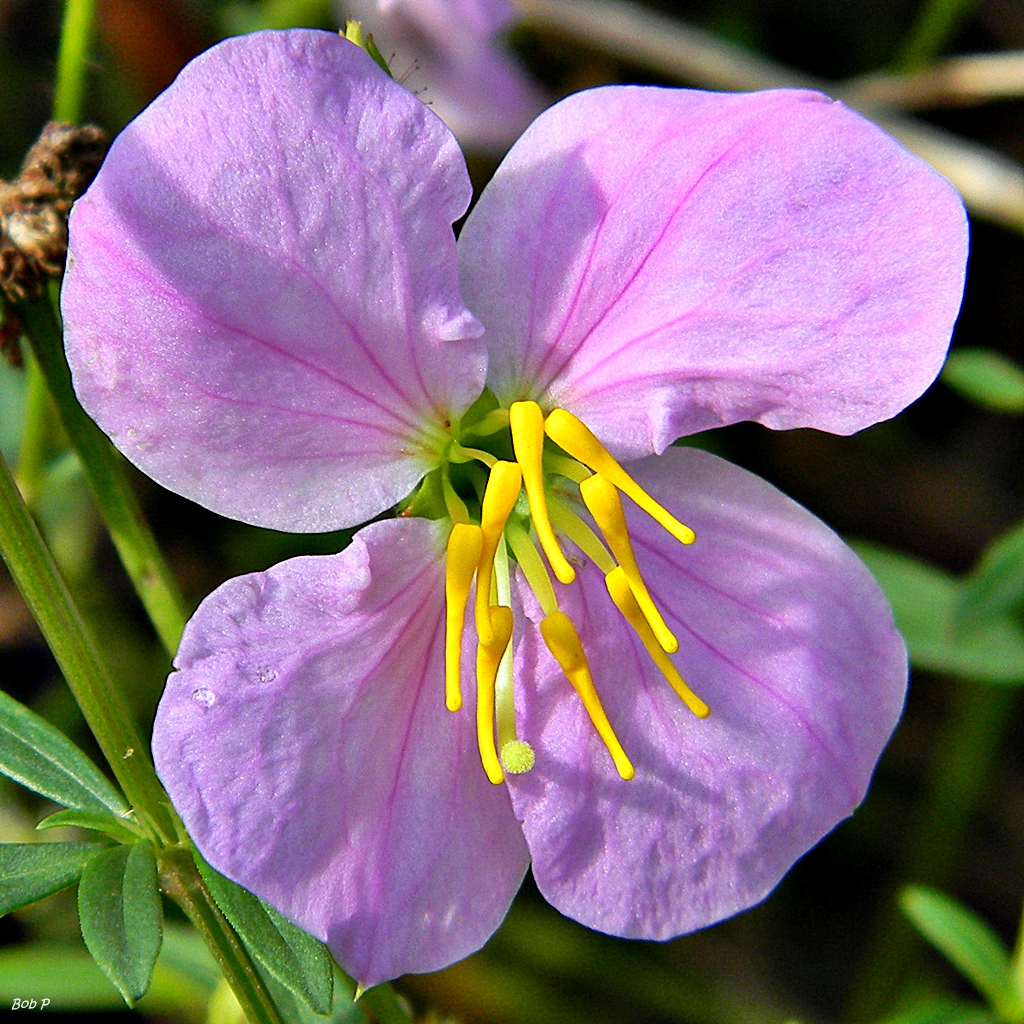
Rhexia mariana flower

This species is used in landscaping and sometimes as a roadside planting.

== Description ==
Rhexia mariana has distinct, symmetrical flowers that can be any color from white to shades of lavender. Rhexia mariana has anthers 4–11 mm long. These anthers are often yellow or orange. Depending on the conditions in which they are grown, leaf size varies widely. Rhexia mariana has anthers 4–11 mm long. The leaves are opposite and lanceolate to lance-oblong. Usually only one vein is visible per leaf, but they actually each have three. Rhexia mariana var. exalbida, sometimes only has one vein per leaf. Leaf edges are serrate, with hairs present. The stem of Rhexia mariana is square and pubescent.

== Taxonomy ==
Rhexia mariana was first described by Linnaeus in Species Plantarum in 1753. Rhexia mariana has 8 subspecies, including Rhexia mariana var. portoricensis, Rhexia mariana var. exalbida, and Rhexia mariana var. interior. This plant is one of 5115 known species in the Melastomataceae family. Rhexia mariana has a few common names, including the Pale Meadow Beauty or the Maryland Meadow Beauty.

== Distribution and habitat ==
Rhexia mariana can be found in marshy, wet areas, with full sun. It prefers a moist soil that is either loamy or sandy. The Rhexia mariana var. exalbida can be found in drier soils than other variants, making it one of the more aggressively spreading varieties. Rhexia mariana prefers acidic soil, with a pH of 6 or lower. While it does not do well in the shade, Rhexia mariana is a great wildflower for beginner gardeners with full sun and moist, acidic soils. This North American wildflower can be found from New York all the way south to Florida and west to Texas.

== Biology ==
Rhexia mariana is a perennial plant. Each flower is perfect, containing both male and female parts. Bees are the main pollinators, their buzzing is what triggers the plant to eject pollen. The roots of this plant often grow laterally. Once the plant has flowered, their roots begin to grow faster than prior to flowering, producing numerous new roots. Unlike other plants in the Rhexia genus, Rhexia mariana has stomata on both sides of the leaves.

== Conservation status ==
The species Rhexia mariana is not considered threatened or endangered globally. The global rank is G5 (secure), but it is threatened in some states. In Maryland, Rhexia mariana ranges from imperiled to critically imperiled, depending on the area of the state. In Massachusetts, the only New England state in which the plant still occurs, Rhexia mariana is considered endangered.

== Threats to the species ==
=== Development ===
Rhexia mariana often grows in locations that are under human developmental pressure, such as lake and pond-side. This means that as development occurs, the amount of habitat for the species is shrinking. In areas like Cape Cod, Massachusetts, US, where human populations have seen steady growth since the 1825, many plant species, including many Rhexia mariana populations have been extirpated.

=== Water level fluctuation ===
Occasional flooding is important for Rhexia mariana to thrive along pond and lake shores. The occasional flood keeps the shore line uninhabitable for upland species, reducing competition for Rhexia mariana and other wetland plants. However, the water level must fluctuate, receding back for periods of time, in order for aquatic species not to take hold and outgrow Rhexia mariana. Human water consumption has depleted the water table in some places, disrupting regular fluctuation patterns.

== Germination ==
In order for Rhexia mariana seeds to germinate they must be exposed to light. They germinate in the 20/35C temperature regime in the New England states. Additionally, Rhexia mariana seeds were found to be the only seeds from the Melastomataceae family in the temperate region to experience physiological dormancy. In only a square meter worth of ground covered in Rhexia mariana there is the potential for over 900,000 seeds to grow and disperse.

== Control ==
Rhexia mariana is a common weed in many blueberry fields in North Carolina. Flumioxazin, an herbicide, has been found to be quite effective in killing Rhexia mariana, without harming crops such as blueberries. Rhexia mariana has roots that grow in the same soil zone as blueberries, making them an important target for weed control in these agricultural fields.

== Host plant ==
Rhexia mariana can be host to species such as the corn earworm (Heliothis zea) and the tobacco budworm (Heliothis virescens).

== Ecology ==
Rhexia mariana is insect pollinated and is recorded to have been visited in northern Florida by Augochloropsis metallica and Nomia nortoni.
