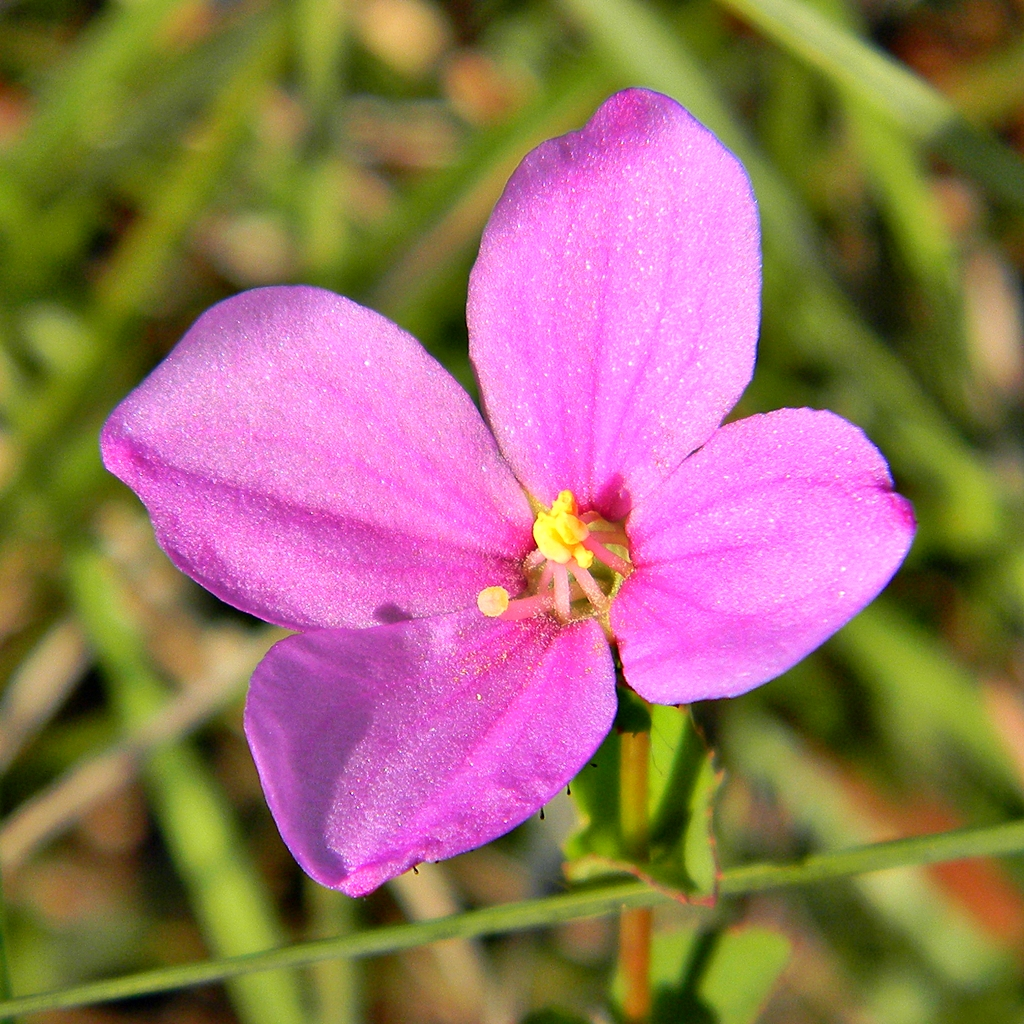
- Close-up of flower

Scientific classification
- Kingdom: Plantae
- Clade: Tracheophytes
- Clade: Angiosperms
- Clade: Eudicots
- Clade: Rosids
- Order: Myrtales
- Family: Melastomataceae
- Genus: Rhexia
- Species: R. nuttallii

Binomial name
- Rhexia nuttallii C.W.James

Synonyms
- Rhexia serrulata Nutt.

= Rhexia nuttallii =

Species of plant

Rhexia nuttallii, commonly known as Nuttall's meadowbeauty, is a flowering plant species in the Melastomataceae family, native to Georgia and Florida in the United States. This perennial, which grows up to 35 cm (14 in), thrives in wet areas including pine woodlands, depressions, flatwoods, and along pond edges. It was named in honor of Thomas Nuttall.
