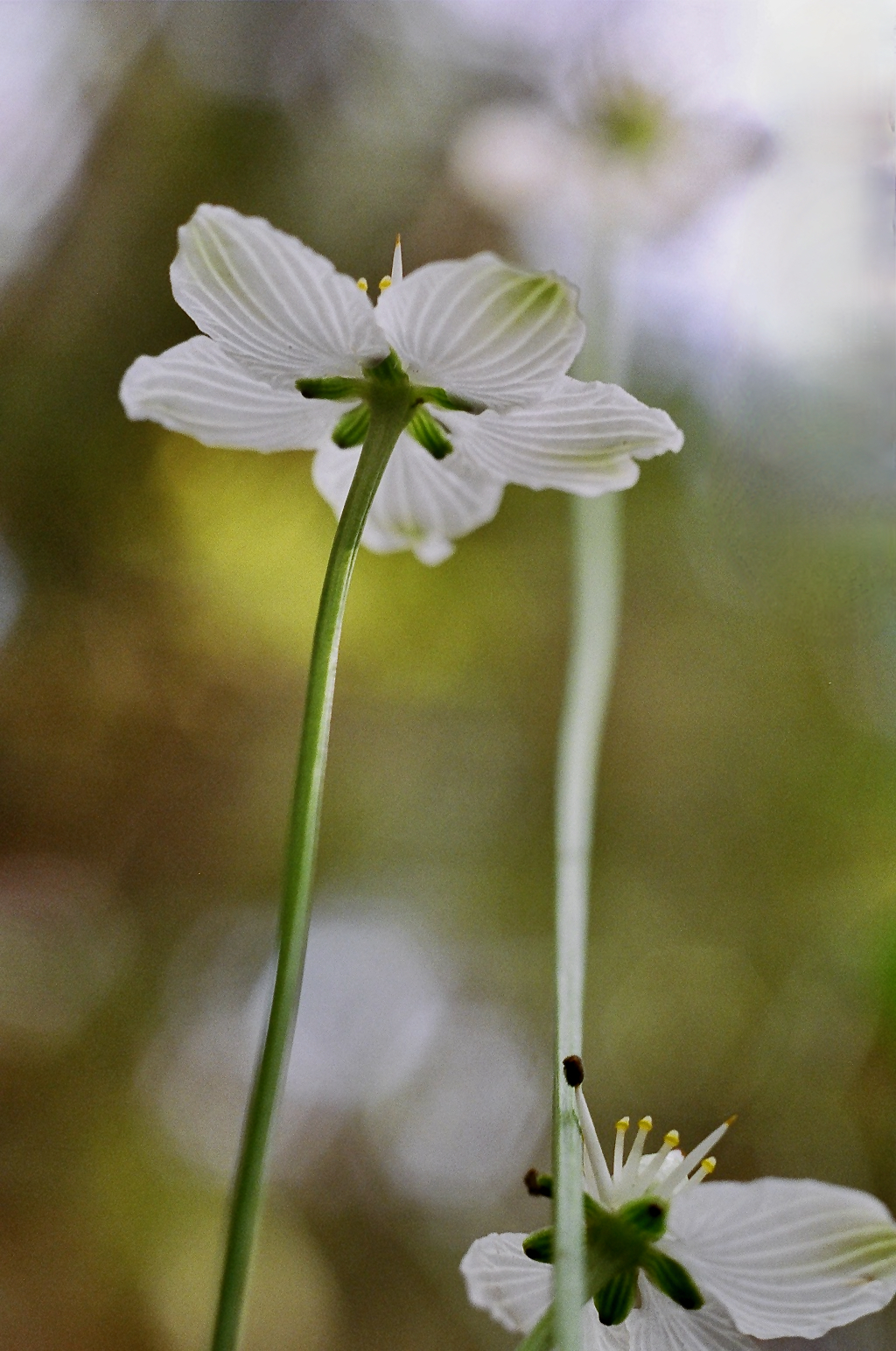

Scientific classification
- Kingdom: Plantae
- Clade: Embryophytes
- Clade: Tracheophytes
- Clade: Angiosperms
- Clade: Eudicots
- Clade: Rosids
- Order: Celastrales
- Family: Celastraceae
- Genus: Parnassia
- Species: P. asarifolia

Binomial name
- Parnassia asarifolia Vent.

= Parnassia asarifolia =

Species of plant

Paranassia asarifolia, commonly known as kidneyleaf-grass-of-Parnassus or Appalachian-grass-of-Parnassus is a small, perennial wildflower in the family Celastraceae native to the southeastern United States. It occurs mainly in the southern Appalachian region, where it grows in cool, wet habitats such as mountain bogs, fens, seeps, and wet woodlands on acidic soils..

The species is distinguished by its basal rosette of kidney-shaped leaves and a single white, veined flower borne on an erect stem. Flowering occurs from mid-summer to early autumn, followed by capsule fruit development. Like other members of the genus Parnassia, its flowers have sterile staminodes that likely aid in insect pollination.

Parnassia asarifolia is a long-lived perennial that reproduces by seed and depends on stable wetland conditions. Although it is considered relatively secure overall, it is rare or endangered in some states that it grows in. It has no documented medicinal uses but is sometimes cultivated in native gardens within its range.

== Description ==
This species is a perennial, wildflower herb that grows on an erect, green stem that is between 18-50 centimeters long and a single white flower at the top. Its flowers bloom from July-October and fruits from September-November.

Most leaves are basal and arranged in a rosette, each attached to a 6-17 centimeter petiole. The larger leafs can be broadly reniform to reniform-orbiculate, typically wider than long with a cordate base and rounded apex. When they are present, cauline leaves occur on the middle to lower portion of the stem.

During fruiting, the flowers have sepals that bend backward, or are reflexed. These sepals are small, oblong to slightly egg-shaped with narrow, translucent margins. The petals are much larger than the sepals, approximately 10-18 mm long and 7-11 mm wide, and are oval to elliptic shaped with visible green, translucent veins. Each of the five petals narrows into a short claw-like shape where it attaches to the flower. A distinguishing characteristic is the set of five staminodes, or nonfunctional stamen, that are shorter than the five stamens. It also has one pistil with a single, superior white-greenish ovary and four stigmas.

== Distribution and habitat ==
Paranassia asarifolia is distributed across the southern Appalachian region and surrounding areas in Alabama, Arkansas, Georgia, Kentucky, Maryland, North Carolina, South Carolina, Tennessee, Texas, Virginia, West Virginia. It is found in boggy or swampy areas such as fens, wet woods, rocky banks, and mountain bogs, and it is commonly in acidic soil in loam or sand in full sun to partial shade between 700-4900 feet of elevation.

== Uses ==
There is no documentation of this species having a medicinal use, but it is said to be used in landscaping for native gardens in regions that it is indigenous to.

== Cultivation ==
Since P. asarifolia is such a specialized species, gardeners will sometimes grow it in bog or wet-garden settings. It does best in consistently moist to wet soil, specifically loam or sand, and acidic conditions. This reflects its adaptation to bogs, seeps, and wet woodlands. It requires partial (direct sunlight only part of the day, 2-6 hours) to full sun (6+ hours of direct sunlight a day). It also relies on stable hydrology to survive, as it is sensitive to drying or changes in soil moisture.

== Conservation status ==
Paranassia asarifolia considered endangered in Kentucky and Maryland and uncommon throughout its range. According to NatureServe, it is overall considered "Apparently Secure" in the United States but is considered either imperiled or critically imperiled in seven states. Threats to the species include extensive risks from human activities such as the transformation of land use, the breakup of natural habitats into smaller, isolated areas, and current forest management strategies. It is not recognized as an at-risk species under the Endangered Species Act or by the Committee on the Status of Endangered Wildlife in Canada.

Regional accounts also support how uncommon it is, including a report documenting its notably rare and scattered presence in Arkansas.

== Etymology ==
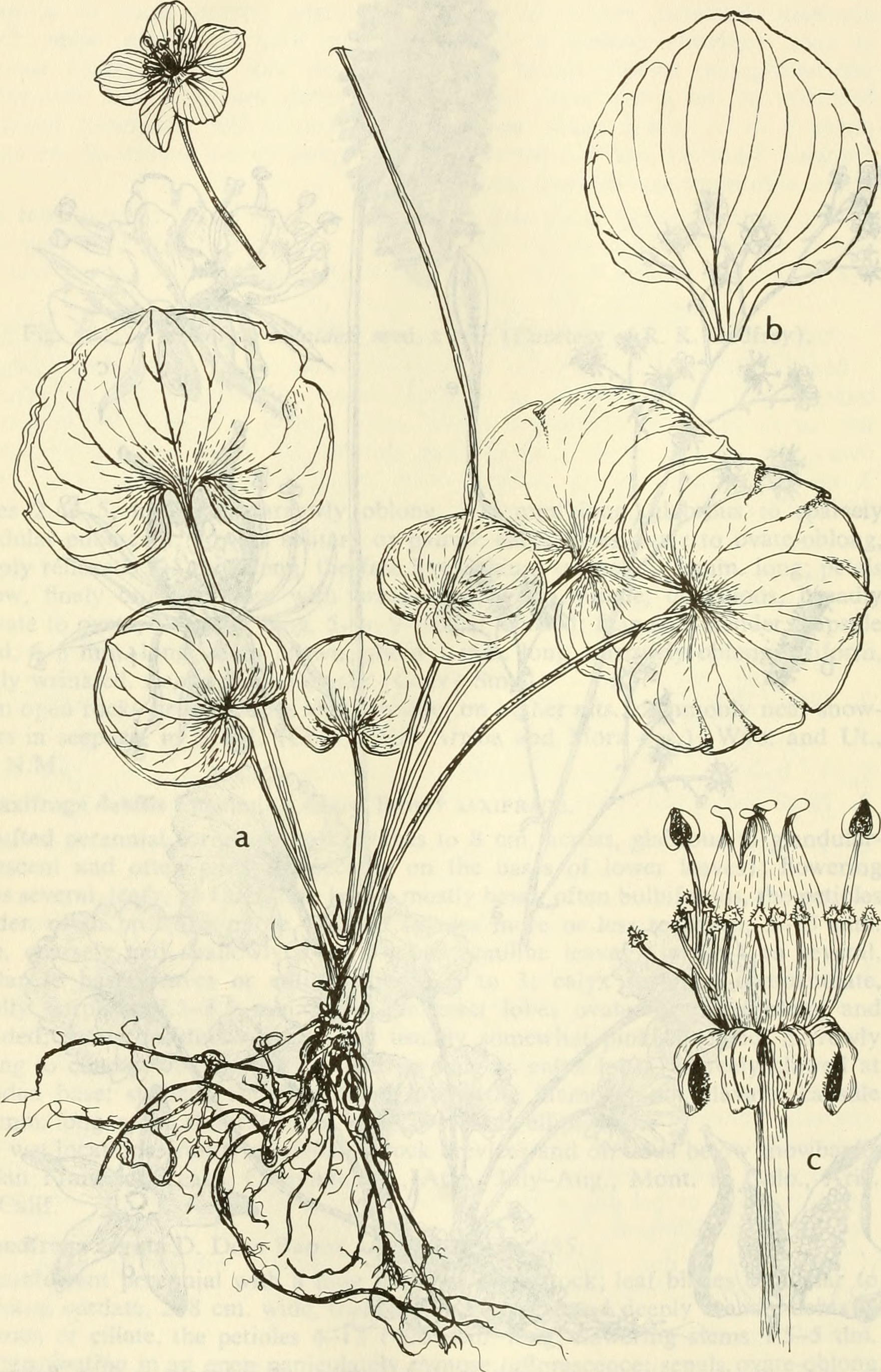
Botanical illustration of Parnassia asarifolia showing the whole plant, leaf, flower, and fruit.

The genus name Parnassia refers to Mount Parnassus in Greece, and asarifolia comes from the Latin-derived terms Asarum, meaning wild ginger, and folia, meaning leaf. This refers to the plant’s kidney-shaped leaves, which resemble those of wild ginger. The common name, kidneyleaf grass-of-Parnassus, is also a misnomer, as the plant is not a true grass.

== Similar species ==
Parnassia asarifolia has similar species that come from the same genus Parnassia, have overlapping ranges and habitats, and also have morphological similarities.

Parnassia grandifolia, known as big-leaf-grass-of-Parnassus also grows in wet areas but is generally associated with calcareous, or higher pH, soils rather than the acidic soils favored by P. asarifolia. This species has more leaves that are often longer than they are wide, unlike P. asarifolia.

Parnassia caroliniana, or Carolina grass-of-Parnassus is a rare perennial that grows in wet prairies and seepage slopes in Florida and parts of the Carolinas. Like P. asarifolia, it has kidney-shaped basal leaves and white flowers with five veined petals, but has a more limited range.

== Life history ==
Parnassia asarifolia is a perennial that comes back each year from the same rootstock. Flowering occurs from mid-summer to early fall (July–October), followed by the development of capsule fruits from September to November. The species reproduces exclusively by seed and is long-lived in its specialized wetland habitats, such as bogs and seeps.

== Ecology ==
This species occurs in wetland habitats that stay moist year-round and thrives in acidic (pH < 6.0) soil. It is a perennial herb and produces solitary white flowers with green veins. Since it is a long-lived species in specialized habitats, P. asarifolia is sensitive to changes in hydrology and habitat disturbance. Its populations are typically localized and sparse, which reflects its dependence on stable, acidic, saturated soil. Although its specific pollinators are not documented, other members of the genus Parnassia generally rely on insect pollination as they are attracted from the fake nectar droplets on the sterile staminodes, which suggests that P. asarifolia would be pollinated similarly.

== Research focus ==
There is not much research done on P. asarifolia, but the species has attracted attention mainly for its scarcity and specialized wetland habitats. Surveys of regional populations, including the rediscovery of a population in Hot Spring County, Arkansas, show how restricted and potentially vulnerable its occurrences can be. Broader taxonomic studies within the genus Parnassia have provided distinctions among species. However, there is more of a research focus on other species of the genus such as Chinese Parnassia species.
