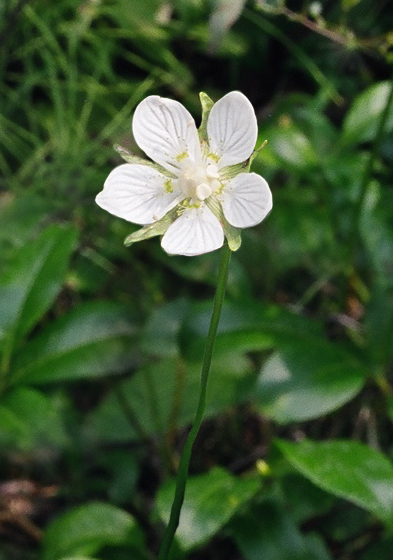
- Parnassia palustris

Scientific classification
- Kingdom: Plantae
- Clade: Tracheophytes
- Clade: Angiosperms
- Clade: Eudicots
- Clade: Rosids
- Order: Celastrales
- Family: Celastraceae
- Subfamily: Parnassioideae
- Genus: Parnassia; L.

Species
- About 50–70

Synonyms
- Enneadynamis Bubani

= Parnassia =

Genus of flowering plants

The genus Parnassia, also known as grass of Parnassus or bog-stars, are flowering plants now placed in the family Celastraceae, formerly classified in Parnassiaceae or Saxifragaceae. The plants occur in arctic and alpine habitats, as well as in dune systems and fens, swamps, wet meadows, open seepage areas, moist woods, and across the Northern Hemisphere. It is actually not a grass, but an herbaceous dicot. The stalk of the plant can reach up to 200 millimeters (8 in), the leaves up to 100 mm (4 in) and the petals can be up to 36 mm (1.4 in) wide. The flower has five white petals with light green venation. There are five stamens alternating with 5 much divided staminodes tipped with drop-like false nectaries which (along with the visual cue of veins) attract pollinating flies and bees.

Some species are often found in wet calcareous habitats with low fertility, low canopy cover, and high plant diversity. Parnassia glauca is considered to be an indicator species of fens in New York State. Such habitats are often becoming rare, and so species of Parnassia may have high conservation value. For example Parnassia palustris is threatened and legally protected in Michigan while Parnassia caroliniana is considered imperiled in North Carolina.

== Culture ==
Parnassus flowers are the symbol of the Clan MacLea, also known as the highland Livingstone clan, and said to be the favorite flower of St. Moluag, the Irish missionary whose staff the clan chiefs hold. Three Grass of Parnassus flowers appear on the Flag of Cumberland, a British county, since that flower grows on Cumberland's lofty fells.

== Species ==
55 species are accepted.

- Parnassia alpicola Makino
- Parnassia amoena Diels
- Parnassia asarifolia Vent.
- Parnassia bifolia Nekr.
- Parnassia cabulica Planch. ex C.B.Clarke
- Parnassia cacuminum Hand.-Mazz.
- Parnassia caroliniana Michx.
- Parnassia chinensis Franch.
- Parnassia cirrata Piper
- Parnassia cooperi W.E.Evans
- Parnassia crassifolia Franch.
- Parnassia davidii Franch.
- Parnassia delavayi Franch.
- Parnassia epunctulata J.T.Pan
- Parnassia esquirolii H.Lév.
- Parnassia faberi Oliv.
- Parnassia farreri W.E.Evans
- Parnassia filchneri Ulbr.
- Parnassia fimbriata K.D.Koenig
- Parnassia foliosa Hook.f. & Thomson
- Parnassia gansuensis T.C.Ku
- Parnassia glauca Raf.
- Parnassia grandifolia DC.
- Parnassia guilinensis G.Z.Li & S.C.Tang
- Parnassia kotzebuei Cham. ex Spreng.
- Parnassia kumaonica Nekr.
- Parnassia labiata C.P.Tsien
- Parnassia laxmannii Pall. ex Schult.
- Parnassia longipetala Hand.-Mazz.
- Parnassia lutea Batalin
- Parnassia monochorifolia Franch.
- Parnassia mysorensis B.Heyne ex Wight & Arn.
- Parnassia noemiae Franch.
- Parnassia nubicola Wall. ex Royle
- Parnassia obovata Hand.-Mazz.
- Parnassia omeiensis T.C.Ku
- Parnassia oreophila Hance
- Parnassia palustris L. (syn. Parnassia californica (A.Gray) Greene)
- Parnassia parviflora DC.
- Parnassia perciliata Diels
- Parnassia procul H.Turner & Veldkamp
- Parnassia pseudoalpicola (Vorosch. & Makarov) A.E.Kozhevn. & Kozhevnikova
- Parnassia pusilla Wall.
- Parnassia rhombipetala B.L.Chai
- Parnassia scaposa Mattf.
- Parnassia simianshanensis M.X.Ren, J.Zhang & Z.Y.Liu
- Parnassia submysorensis J.T.Pan
- Parnassia tenella Hook.f. & Thomson
- Parnassia townsendii B.L.Rob.
- Parnassia trinervis Drude
- Parnassia wightiana Wall. ex Wight & Arn.
- Parnassia xinganensis C.Z.Gao & G.Z.Li
- Parnassia yui C.P.Tsien
- Parnassia yunnanensis Franch.
- Parnassia zhengyuana M.X.Ren & J.Zhang

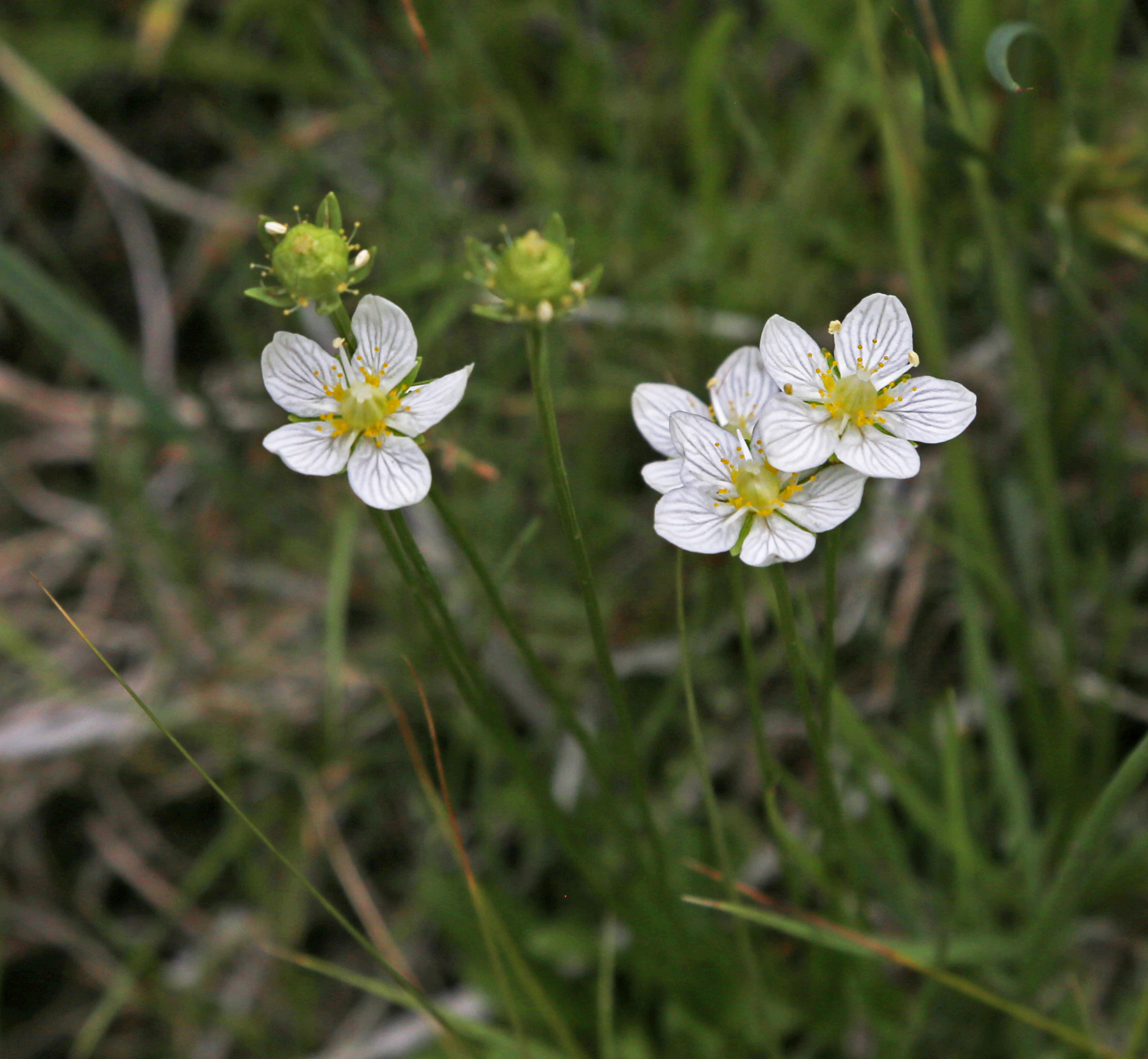
Parnassia parviflora
