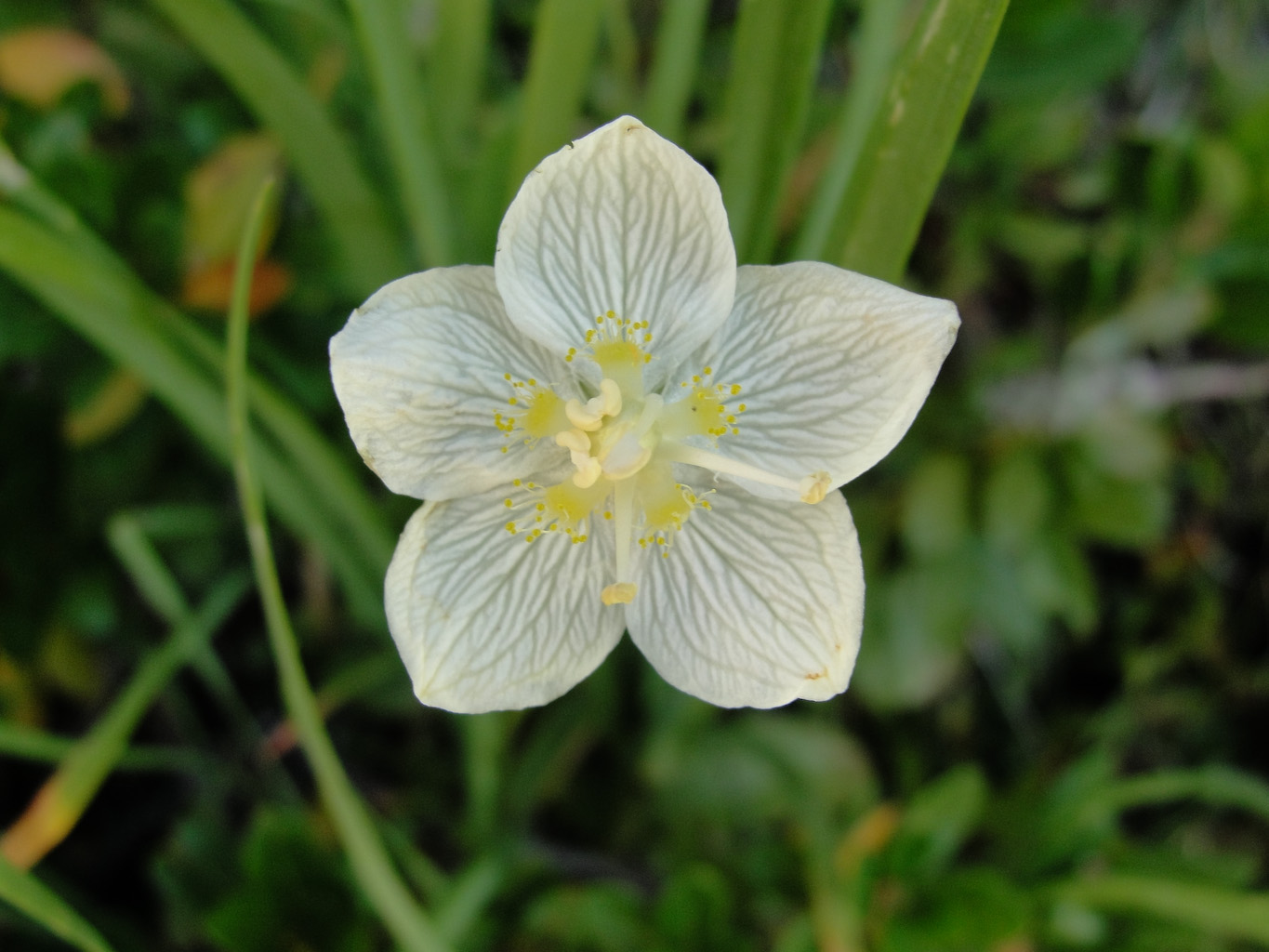

Scientific classification
- Kingdom: Plantae
- Clade: Tracheophytes
- Clade: Angiosperms
- Clade: Eudicots
- Clade: Rosids
- Order: Celastrales
- Family: Celastraceae
- Genus: Parnassia
- Species: P. californica

Binomial name
- Parnassia californica (A.Gray) Greene

= Parnassia californica =

Species of flowering plant

Parnassia californica is a species of flowering plant in the family Celastraceae known by the common name California grass of Parnassus. It is native to the mountains of Oregon, California, and Nevada, where it grows in moist areas such as meadows and streambanks.

It is a perennial herb producing an erect flowering stem from a patch of basal leaves. The leaf is up to 14 centimeters long with an oval or spoon-shaped blade at the end of a long petiole. The inflorescence may be nearly half a meter tall and consists of a mostly naked peduncle with one bract midway up.

The single flower has five small sepals behind five veined white petals each 1 to 2 centimeters long. At the center of the flower are five stamens and five staminodes with fringes of many hairlike, sphere-tipped lobes.

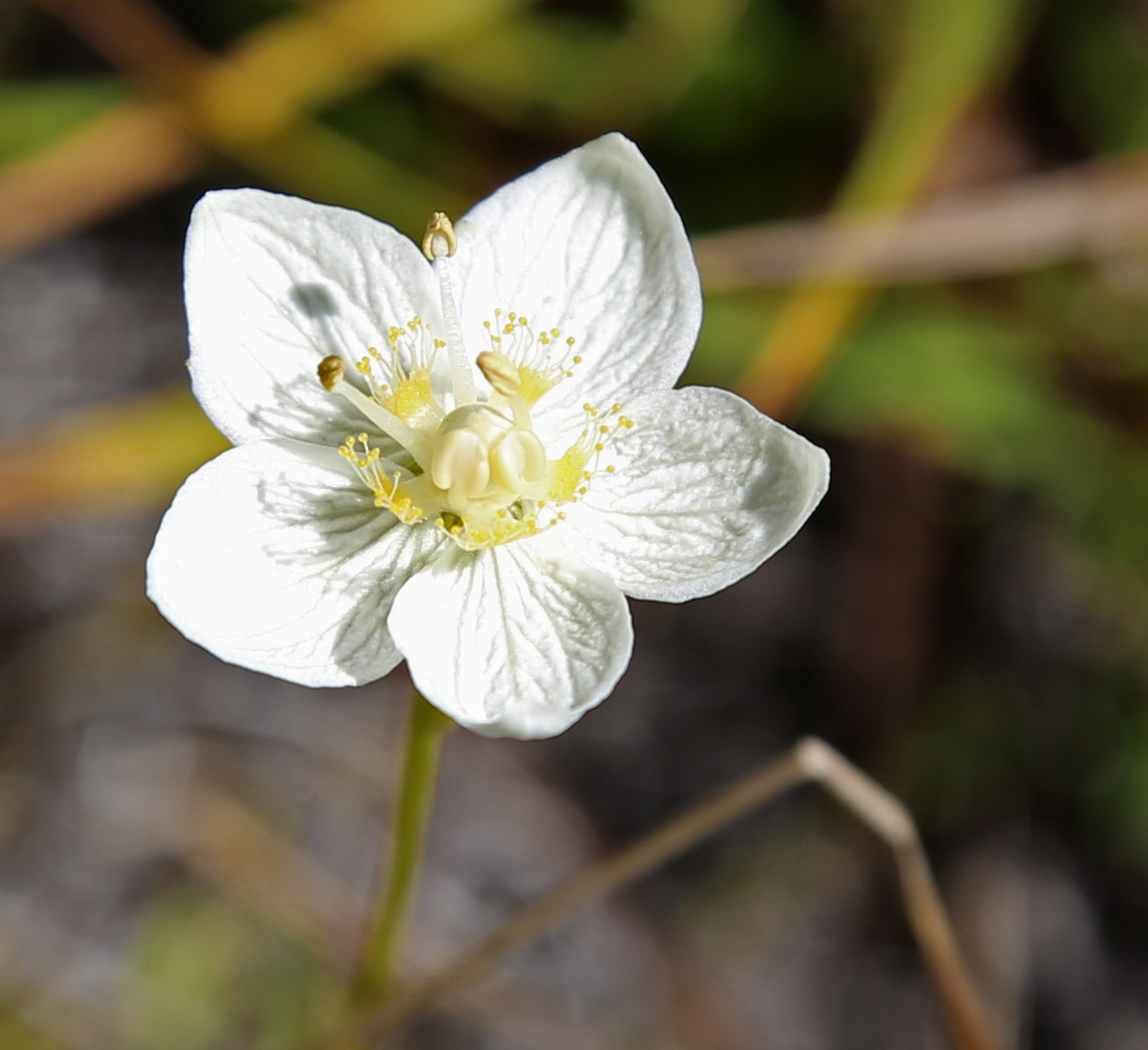
Parnassia californica flower detail
