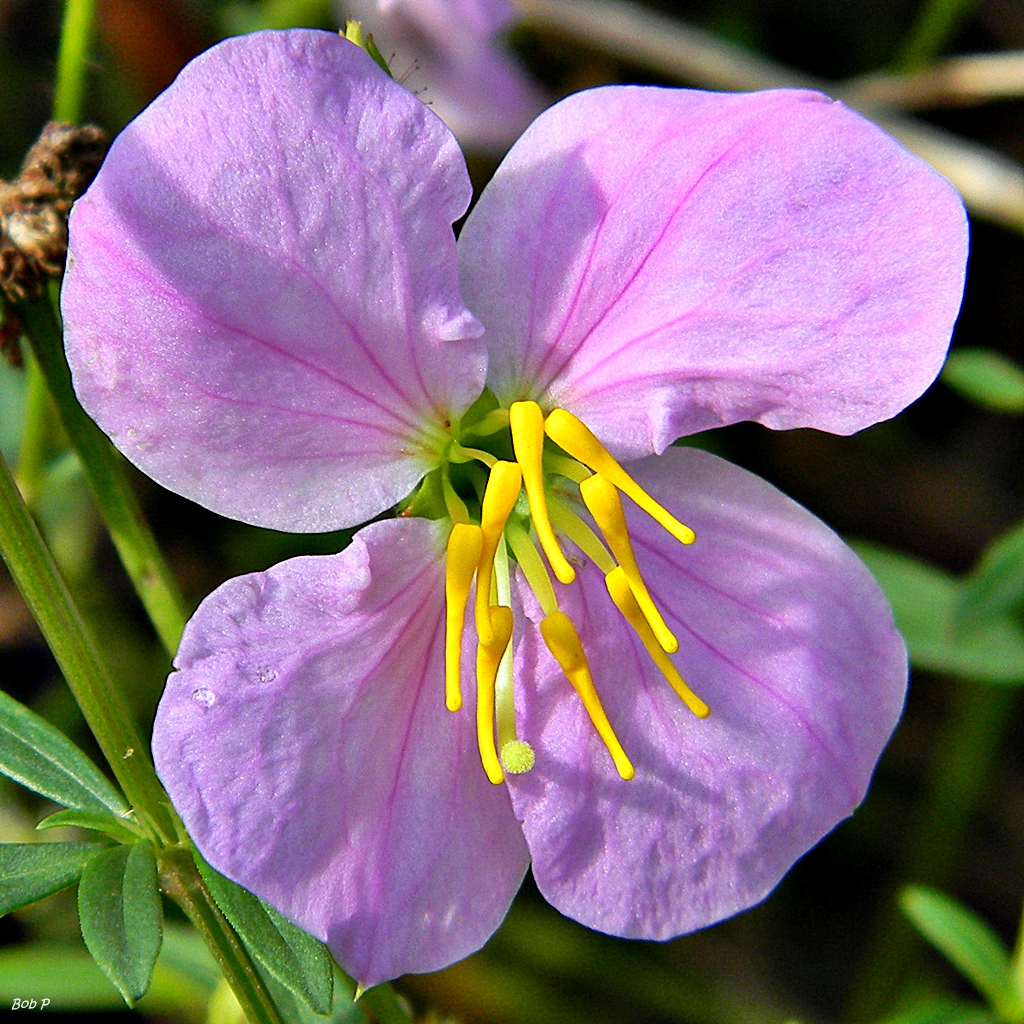
- Rhexia mariana

Scientific classification
- Kingdom: Plantae
- Clade: Embryophytes
- Clade: Tracheophytes
- Clade: Angiosperms
- Clade: Eudicots
- Clade: Rosids
- Order: Myrtales
- Family: Melastomataceae
- Genus: Rhexia; L.

= Rhexia =

Genus of flowering plants

Rhexia is a genus of flowering plants in the family Melastomataceae. Rhexia species are commonly called "meadow beauty" and 11 to 13 species of Rhexia have been recognized depending on different taxonomic treatments.

== Distribution ==
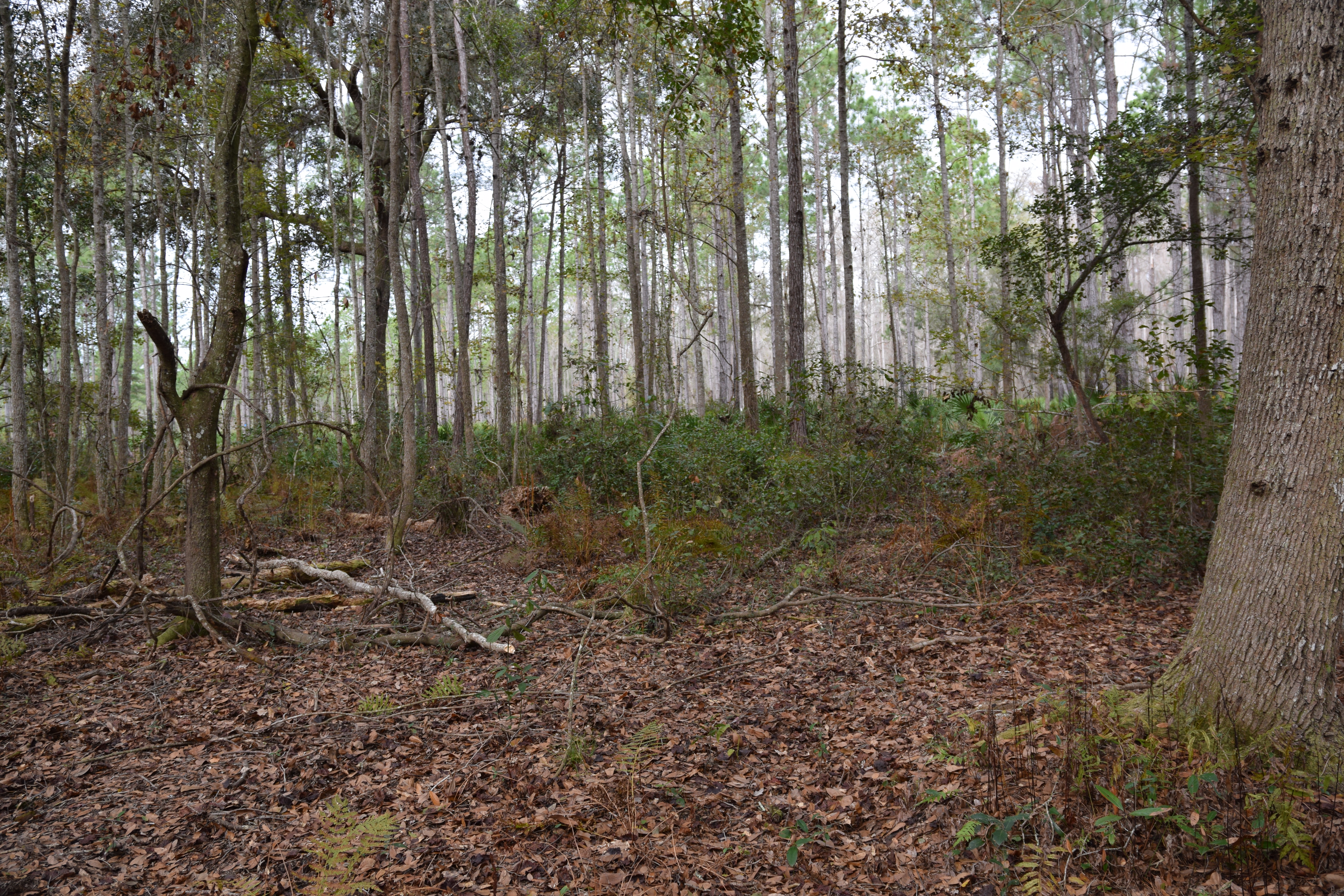
Natural habitat of Rhexia sp., Gainesville, Florida

Unlike other members of the same family showing pantropical distribution, Rhexia is mainly distributed in temperate region of southeastern part of North America; from Nova Scotia to Florida and the West Indies (Cuba, Hispaniola, and Puerto Rico) and west to eastern Texas. The species of Rhexia are frequently found in wet meadows, coastal plain marshes, sandy wetlands and lake edges, pine woods, and road-side swales. Most Rhexia species successfully establish on open areas disturbed by recurrent burning or reclamation.

== Description ==
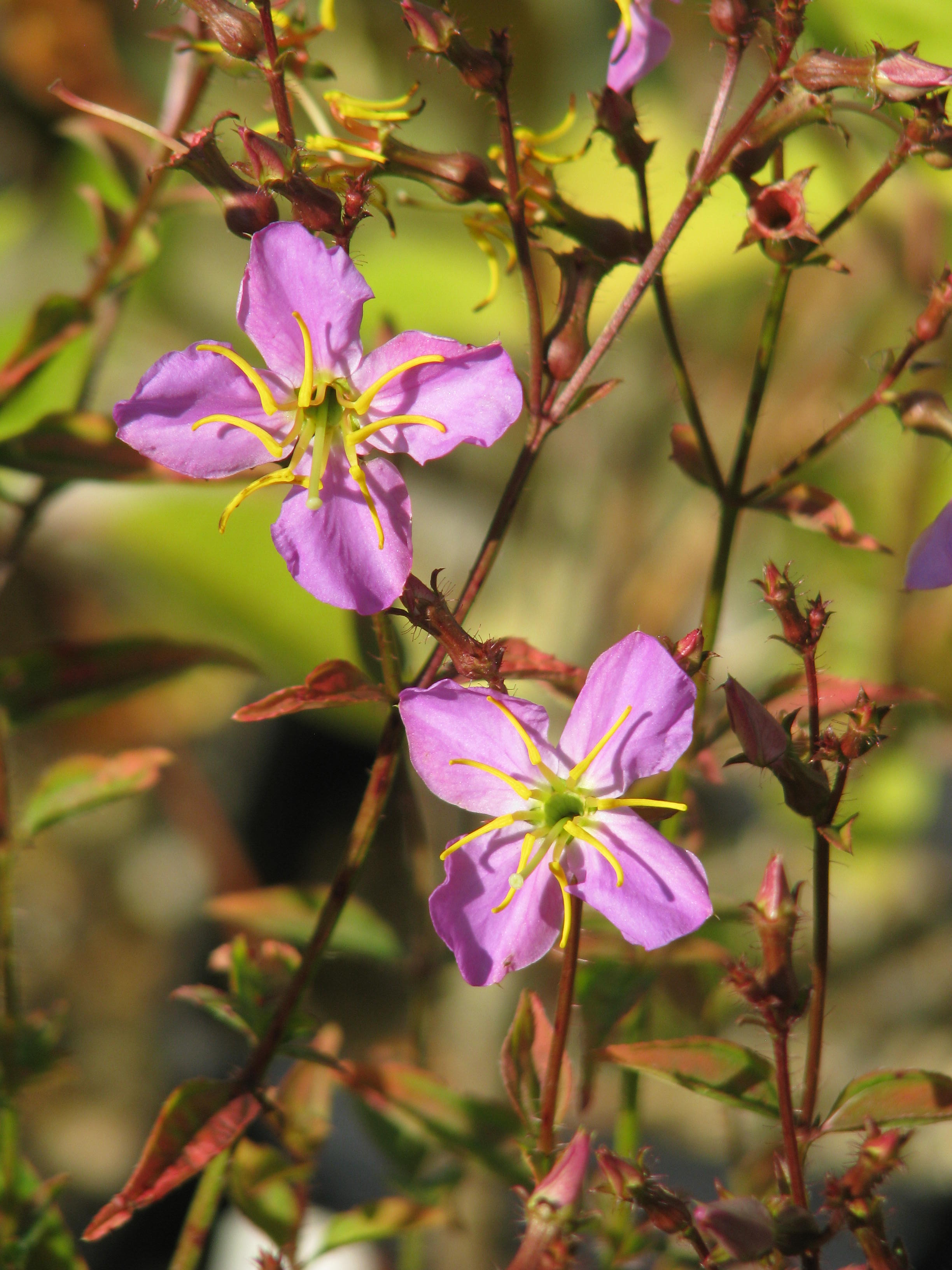
Rhexia mariana

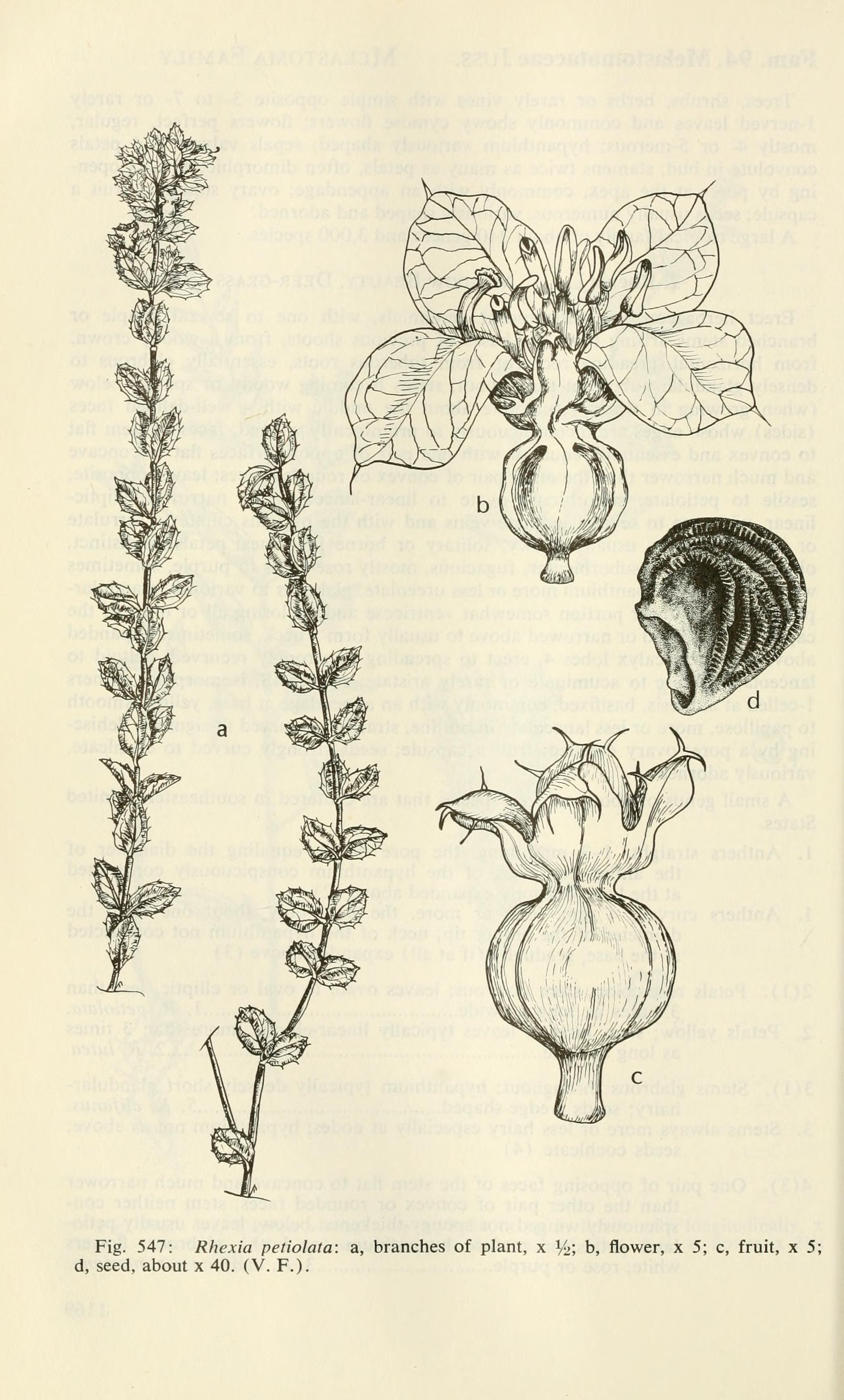
Illustration of Rhexia petiolata

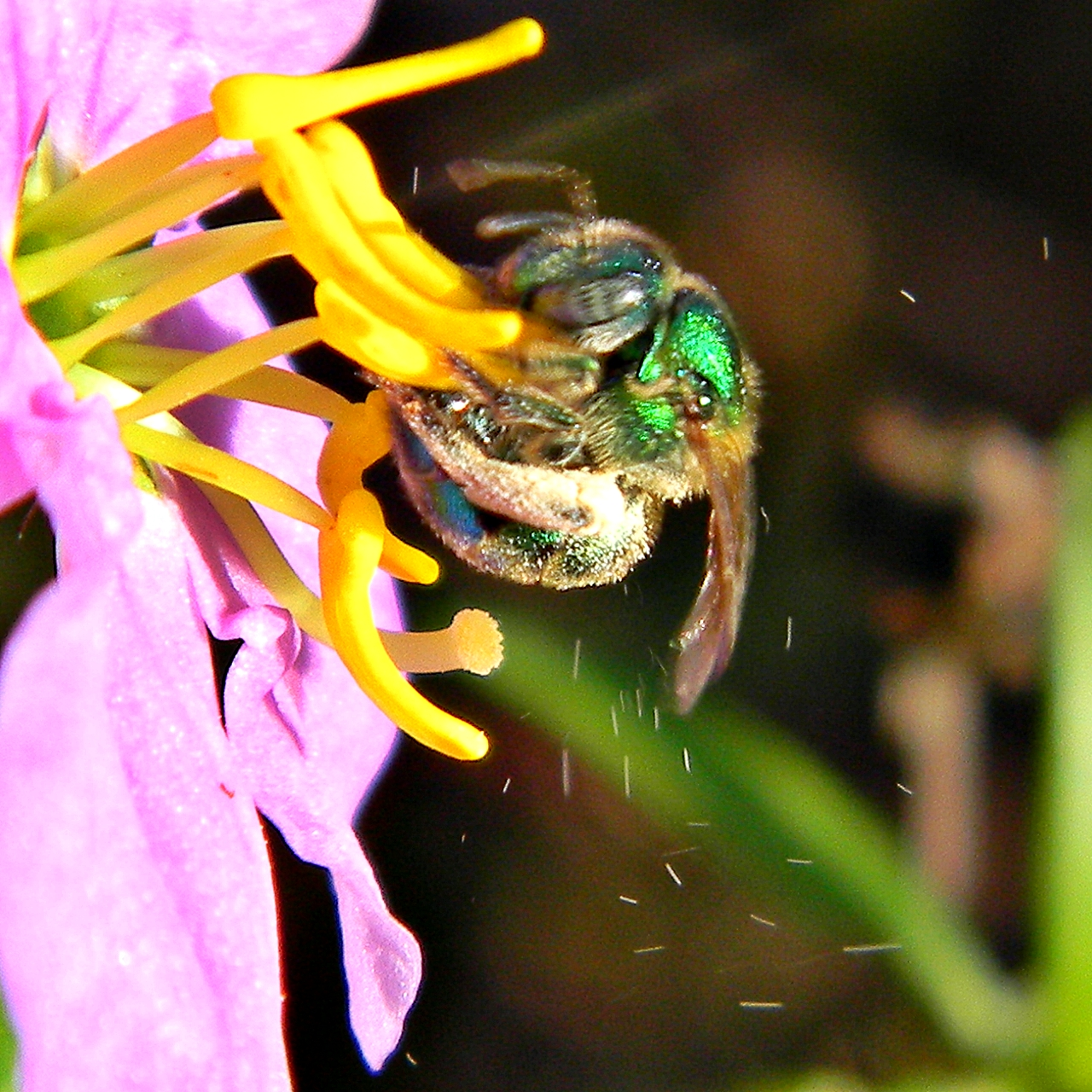
Buzz pollination

Rhexia species are herbaceous perennials. Opposite leaves are simple, ovate to lanceolate and have the typical acrodromous venation (prominent arcuate nerves) characteristic of the Melastomataceae. Stems have four faces; one set is broader and convex, the other set is narrower, concave. Flowers are actinomorphic (radially symmetrical), 2–3 cm in diameter, pink-purple to white, (yellow in R. lutea), petals 4, sepals 4, stamens 8. Bright yellow anthers are long and curved counterclockwise. Seeds are cochleate (noncochleate in R. alifanus).

== Pollination ==
The Melastomataceae is a large tropical plant family characterized by buzz pollination. Like other members of the family, it appears that flowers of Rhexia species are buzz pollinated. For example, Rhexia virginica is buzz pollinated by bumblebees and shows two representative features of the buzz pollination syndrome; bright yellow anthers and flower color changes after anthesis.

== Taxonomy ==
Taxonomic treatments of Rhexia suggested by James (1956) and Kral and Bostick (1969) have been broadly used. Both James (1956) and Kral and Bostick (1969) recognized two main groups (series A and series B) within Rhexia based on morphological characters of anthers. Species in series A have 2 mm long straight, ascending anthers and three species (R. petiolata, R. nuttallii, and R. lutea) belong to this group. Eight members of series B show 4–11 mm long descending, curved anthers (R. alifanus, R. mariana, R. virginica, R. salicifolia, R. cubensis, R. aristosa, R. parviflora and R. nashii). Recently, new infrageneric classification of Rhexia was suggested by Nesome (2012) based mainly on stem morphology. Nesom (2012) recognized 13 species within Rhexia by treating two tetraploid R. mariana var. ventricosa and R. mariana var. interior as specific rank based on allopatric distribution and distinct stem morphology of these entities. The Nesome's classification divides Rhexia into four sections: (1) Sect. RHEXIA (R. aristosa, R. salicifolia, R. virginica, R. interior, R. ventricosa, R. mariana, R. cubensis, R. nashii, R. parviflora; (2) Sect. CYMBORHEXIA (R. alifanus); (3) Sect. BREVIANTHERA (R. petiolata, R. nuttallii; and (4) Sect. LUTEORHEXIA (R. lutea).

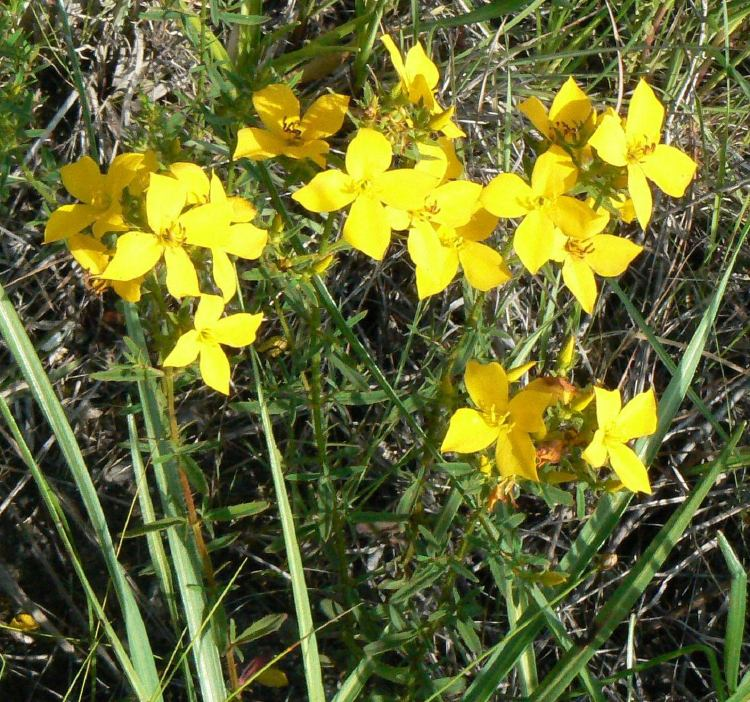
Rhexia lutea

== Molecular phylogeny ==
Ionta et al. (2007) reconstructed phylogeny of Rhexia species based on molecular data (nuclear ribosomal DNA and chloroplast DNA sequence) and morphological data. The analyses supported a phylogenetic tree with three major clades: (1) R. petiolata clade (R. alifanus, R. nuttallii, R. petiolata); (2) R. mariana clade (R. mariana); and (3) R.virginica clade (R.virginica, R. aristosa). Remaining species showed incongruence between nuclear ribosomal DNA tree and chloroplast DNA tree (R. lutea, R. nashii, R. salicifolia) and/or multiple alleles of ncpGS (R. cubensis, R. lutea, R. nashii, R. parviflora, and R. salicifolia) implying putative hybrid origin of these species.

== Species list ==
This infrageneric classification of Rhexia is based on Nesom (2012).

Section RHEXIA

• Rhexia aristosa Britton

• Rhexia salicifolia Kral & Bostick

• Rhexia virginica L.

• Rhexia mariana L.

• Rhexia cubensis Griseb.

• Rhexia nashii Small

• Rhexia parviflora Chapm.

Section CYMBORHEXIA

• Rhexia alifanus Walter

Section BREVIANTHERA

• Rhexia nuttallii C.W. James

• Rhexia petiolata Walter

Section. LUTEORHEXIA

• Rhexia lutea Walter
