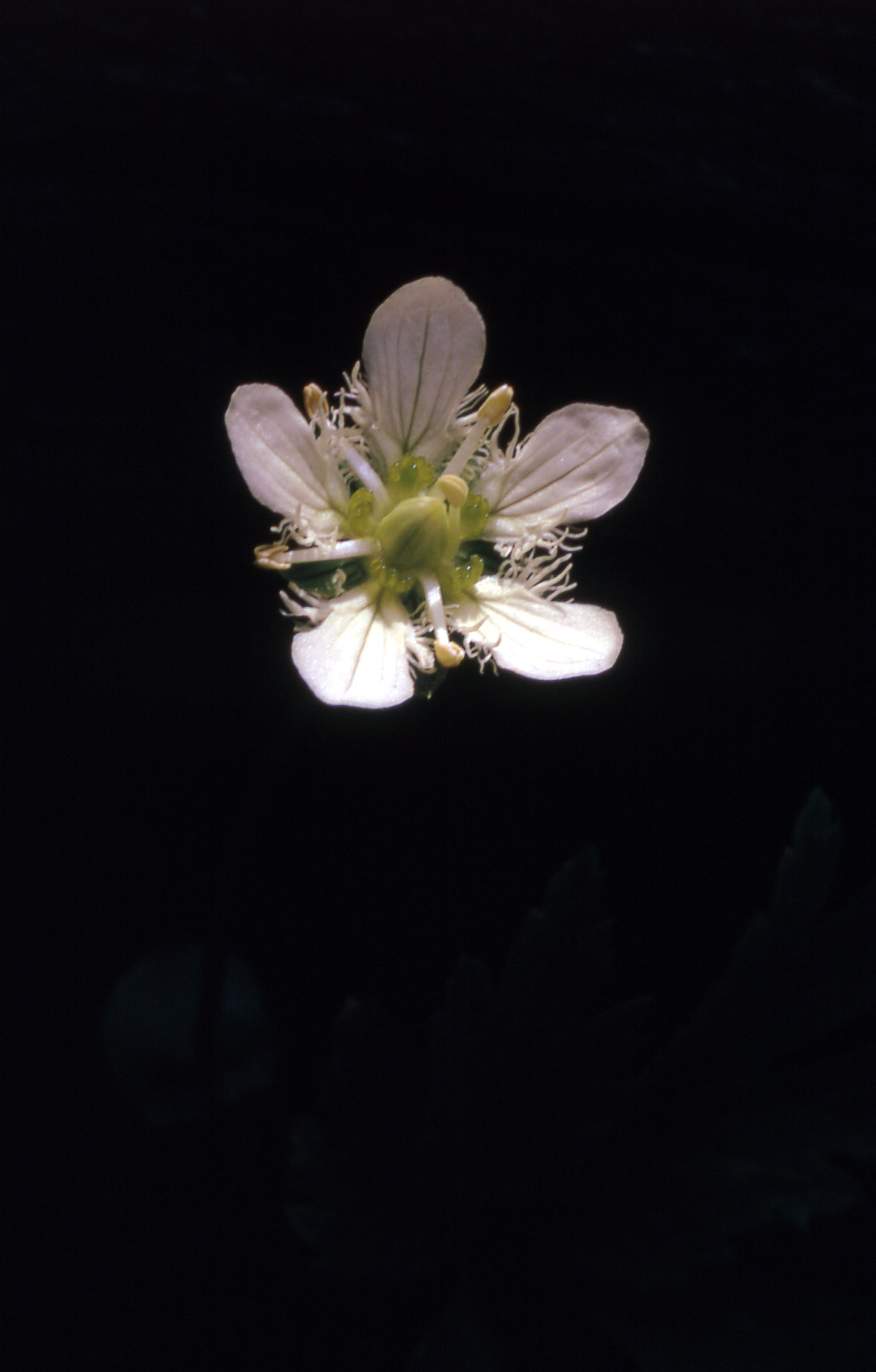

Conservation status
- Apparently Secure (NatureServe)

- Least Concern (IUCN 3.1)

Scientific classification
- Kingdom: Plantae
- Clade: Tracheophytes
- Clade: Angiosperms
- Clade: Eudicots
- Clade: Rosids
- Order: Celastrales
- Family: Celastraceae
- Genus: Parnassia
- Species: P. fimbriata

Binomial name
- Parnassia fimbriata K.D.Koenig

Synonyms
- Parnassia rivularis Osterh.

= Parnassia fimbriata =

Species of flowering plant

Parnassia fimbriata is a species of flowering plant in the family Celastraceae known by the common name fringed grass of Parnassus. It was first described by Charles Konig. It is native to western North America from Alaska and northwestern Canada to the southern Rocky Mountains, where it is a plant of alpine and subalpine environments, usually in wet areas. Despite the common name, this is not a true grass.

== Description ==
It is a perennial herb producing an erect flowering stem from a patch of basal leaves. The leaf has a rounded blade at the end of a long petiole, the leaf reaching a total of up to 16 centimeters long. The inflorescence may be up to 40 centimeters tall and consists of a mostly naked peduncle with one clasping bract midway up.

The single flower has five small jagged sepals behind five veined, fringed white petals each roughly a centimeter long. At the center of the flower are five stamens and five staminodes with edges of many narrow, round-tipped lobes.
