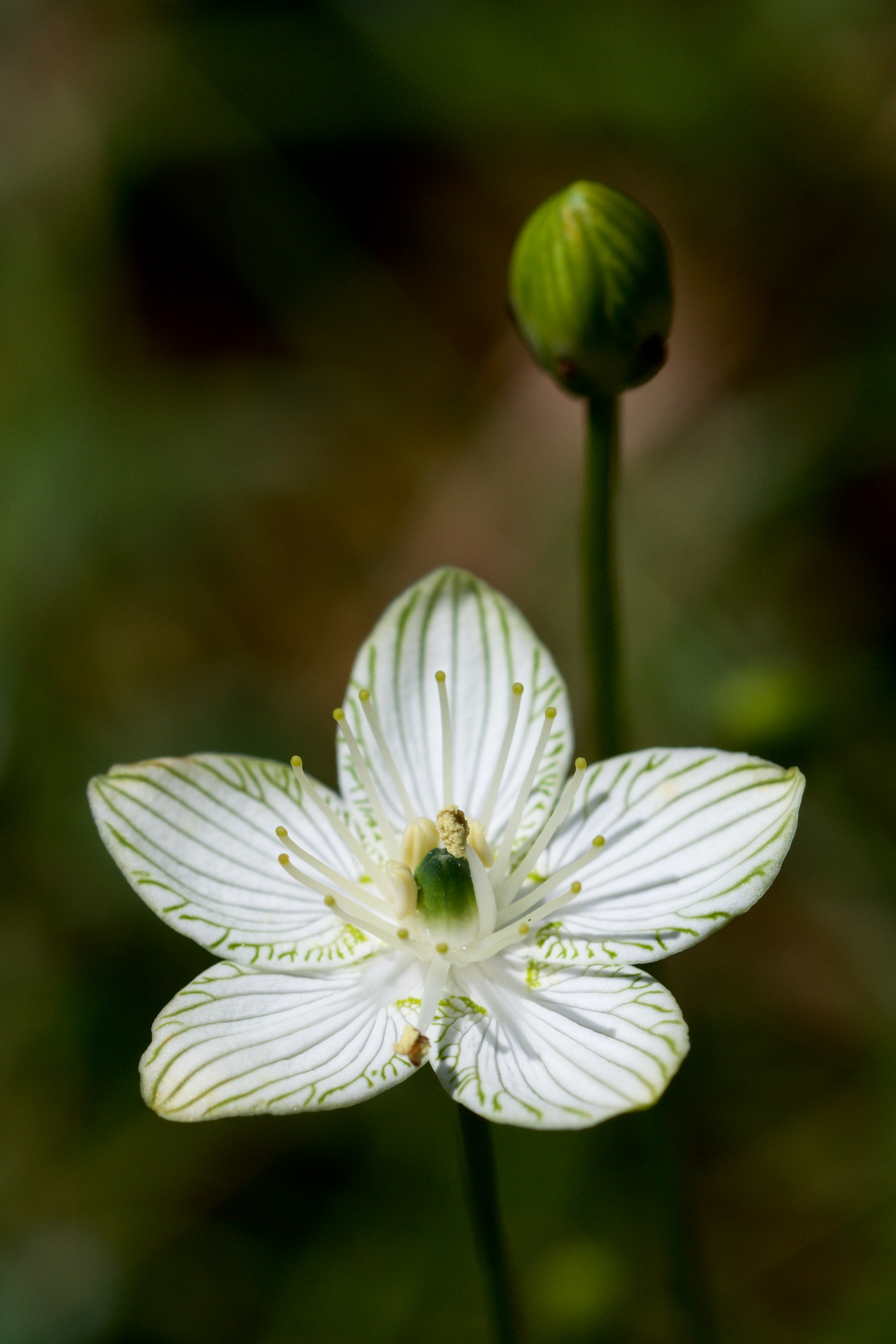

Conservation status
- Vulnerable (NatureServe)

Scientific classification
- Kingdom: Plantae
- Clade: Tracheophytes
- Clade: Angiosperms
- Clade: Eudicots
- Clade: Rosids
- Order: Celastrales
- Family: Celastraceae
- Genus: Parnassia
- Species: P. grandifolia

Binomial name
- Parnassia grandifolia DC.

= Parnassia grandifolia =

Species of flowering plant

Parnassia grandifolia, also known as bigleaf grass of Parnassus, is a flowering herbaceous plant of the family Celastraceae.

It is native to the southeastern United States, where it has a spotty distribution. Its primary habitat is open wet areas over calcareous soil, such as fens and gravelly seeps. However, in the Gulf Coastal Plain it is found in bogs and areas of wet savanna.

Parnassia grandifolia is uncommon throughout its range, often having a low number of individuals at a given site. It is considered an indicator of high quality seepage communities, and does not tolerate habitat degradation. Its specialized wetland habitat has been destroyed in many areas due to development and agriculture. As a result, this species is considered vulnerable.

It is a rosette forming perennial that produces white flowers in late summer and fall.
