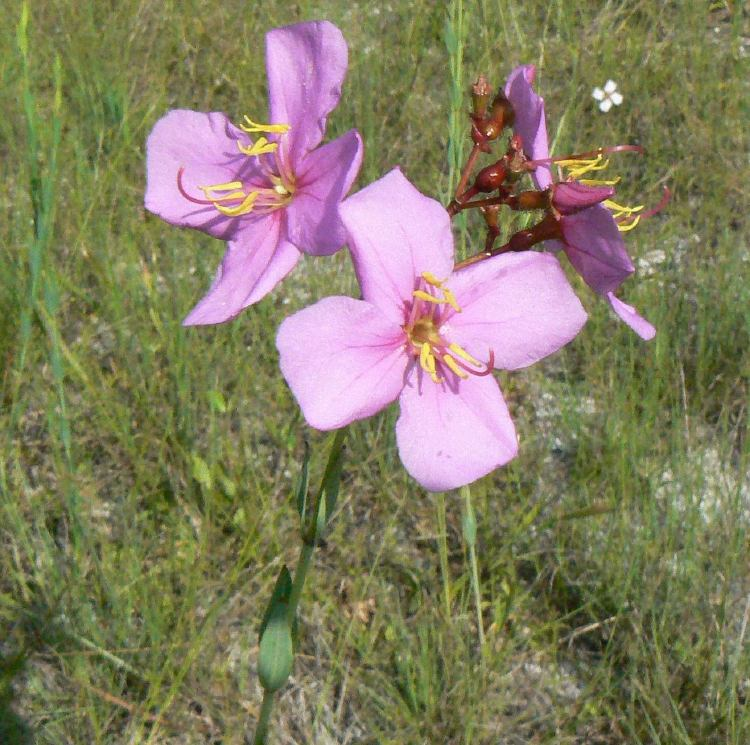

Scientific classification
- Kingdom: Plantae
- Clade: Tracheophytes
- Clade: Angiosperms
- Clade: Eudicots
- Clade: Rosids
- Order: Myrtales
- Family: Melastomataceae
- Genus: Rhexia
- Species: R. alifanus

Binomial name
- Rhexia alifanus Walter

= Rhexia alifanus =

Species of flowering plant

Rhexia alifanus, commonly referred to as savannah meadowbeauty, is a flowering plant in the Rhexia genus. A perennial, it has pink blossoms. It is indigenous to areas of the southeastern United States west to Texas.
