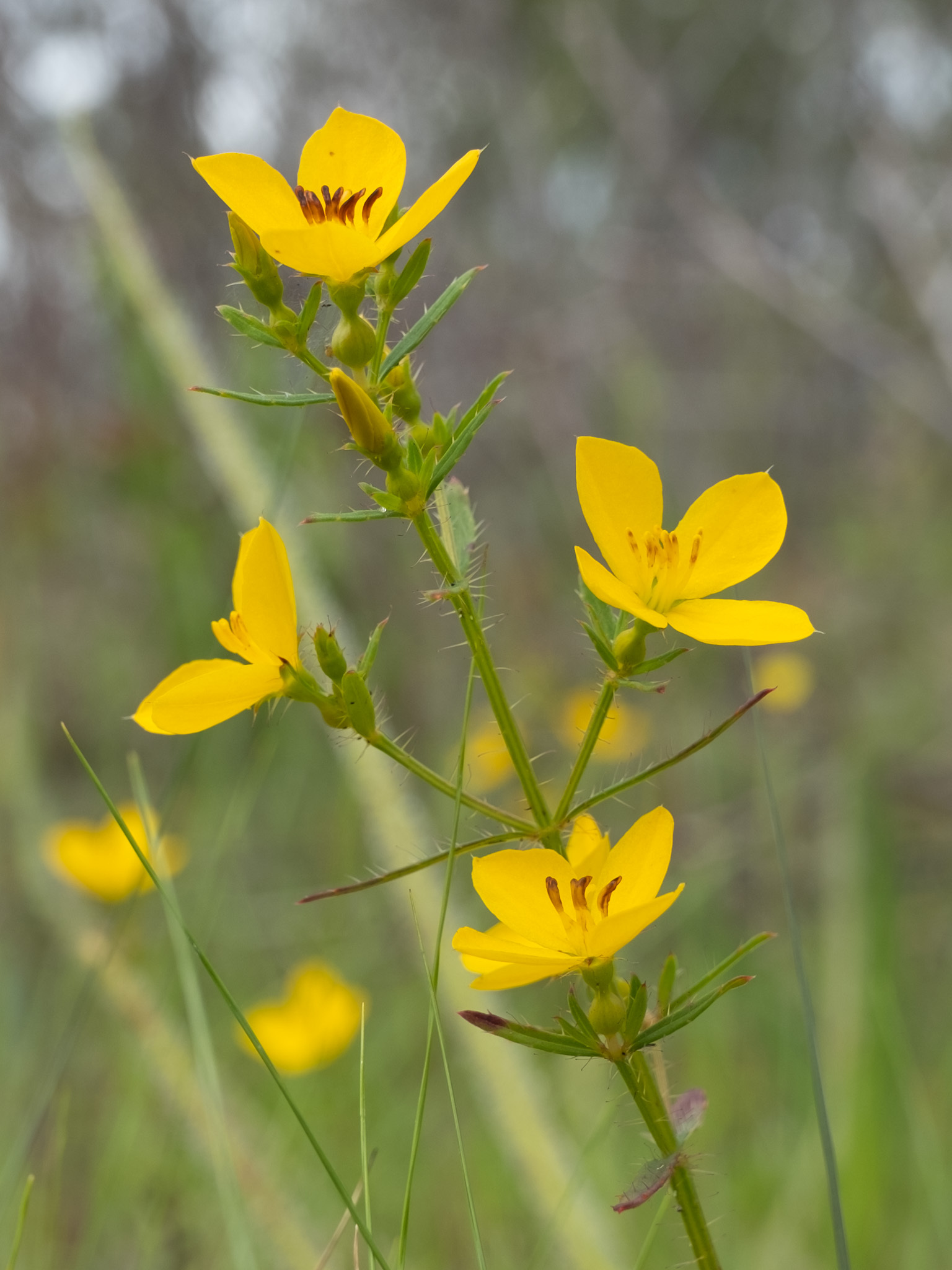

Scientific classification
- Kingdom: Plantae
- Clade: Embryophytes
- Clade: Tracheophytes
- Clade: Spermatophytes
- Clade: Angiosperms
- Clade: Eudicots
- Clade: Rosids
- Order: Myrtales
- Family: Melastomataceae
- Genus: Rhexia
- Species: R. lutea

Binomial name
- Rhexia lutea Walter

= Rhexia lutea =

Species of flowering plant

Rhexia lutea, common name yellow meadow beauty, is a flowering plant in the Melastomataceae family. Rhexia lutea grows in the southeastern United States. It primarily flowers in savannah and pinelands.

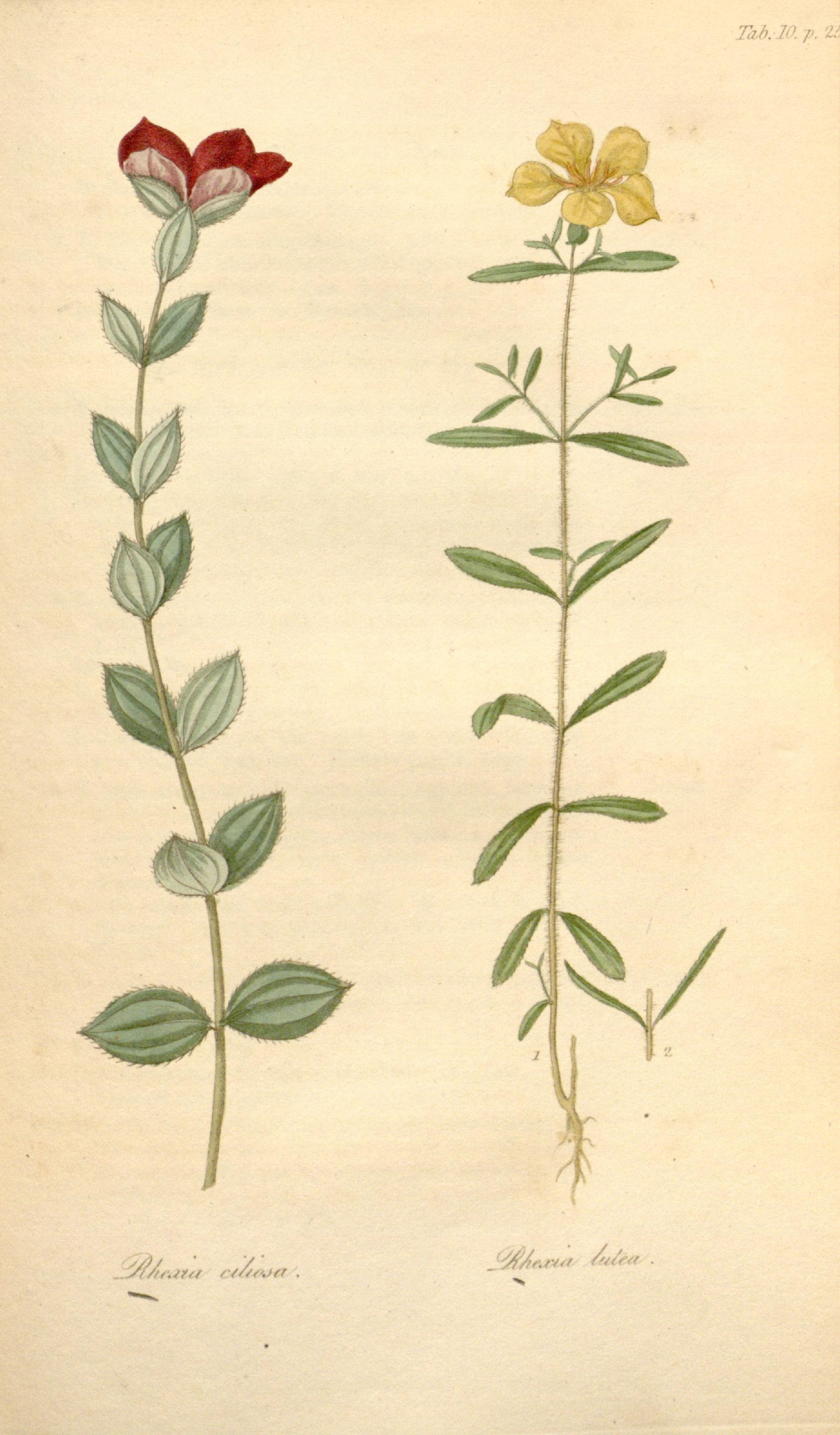
Rhexia cilosa (Rhexia petiolata) and Rhexia lutea illustrations

It is the only member of the genus Rhexia to have yellow flowering. It has straight stamens.
