= Gentiana autumnalis subsp. pennelliana =

Scientific classification
- Kingdom: Plantae
- Clade: Tracheophytes
- Clade: Angiosperms
- Clade: Eudicots
- Clade: Asterids
- Order: Gentianales
- Family: Gentianaceae
- Genus: Gentiana
- Species: G. autumnalis
- Subspecies: G. a. subsp. pennelliana

Trinomial name
- Gentiana autumnalis subsp. pennelliana Fernald 1940

Synonyms
- List: Dasystephana tenuifolia (Raf.) Pennell; Diploma tenuifolia Raf.; Gentiana pennelliana Fernald; Gentiana tenuifolia (Raf.) Fernald; Gentiana angustifolia var. floridana Griseb.; Gentiana frigida var. drummondii Griseb.

Species of plant

Gentiana autumnalis subsp. pennelliana, is a rare subspecies of flowering plant in the gentian family Gentianaceae. It is commonly known as wiregrass gentian or pine barren gentian and grows in sections of the Florida panhandle.

== Taxonomy ==
Gentiana autumnalis subsp. pennelliana was first described as a separate species by Merritt Lyndon Fernald in 1940 and was named after American botanist Francis Whittier Pennell.

== Description ==
Gentiana autumnalis subsp. pennelliana is a perennial herb, which grows at approximately 20 cm (7.9 in) in height. The leaves are linear elliptic, 3–4 cm (1.2–1.6 in) long and widely spaced along the stem. The distinctive white tubular flowers, which are sometimes fringed with purple, are solitary and terminal, with a 7 cm (2.8 in) long flare at the opening with five entire lobes, alternating with five shorter fringed membranes.

== Distribution ==
This subspecies is endemic to parts of the Florida panhandle, where it occurs naturally in pine flatwoods, wet prairies and seepage slopes. It is adapted to fires and flowers in November to December, prolifically when stimulated by fires.
