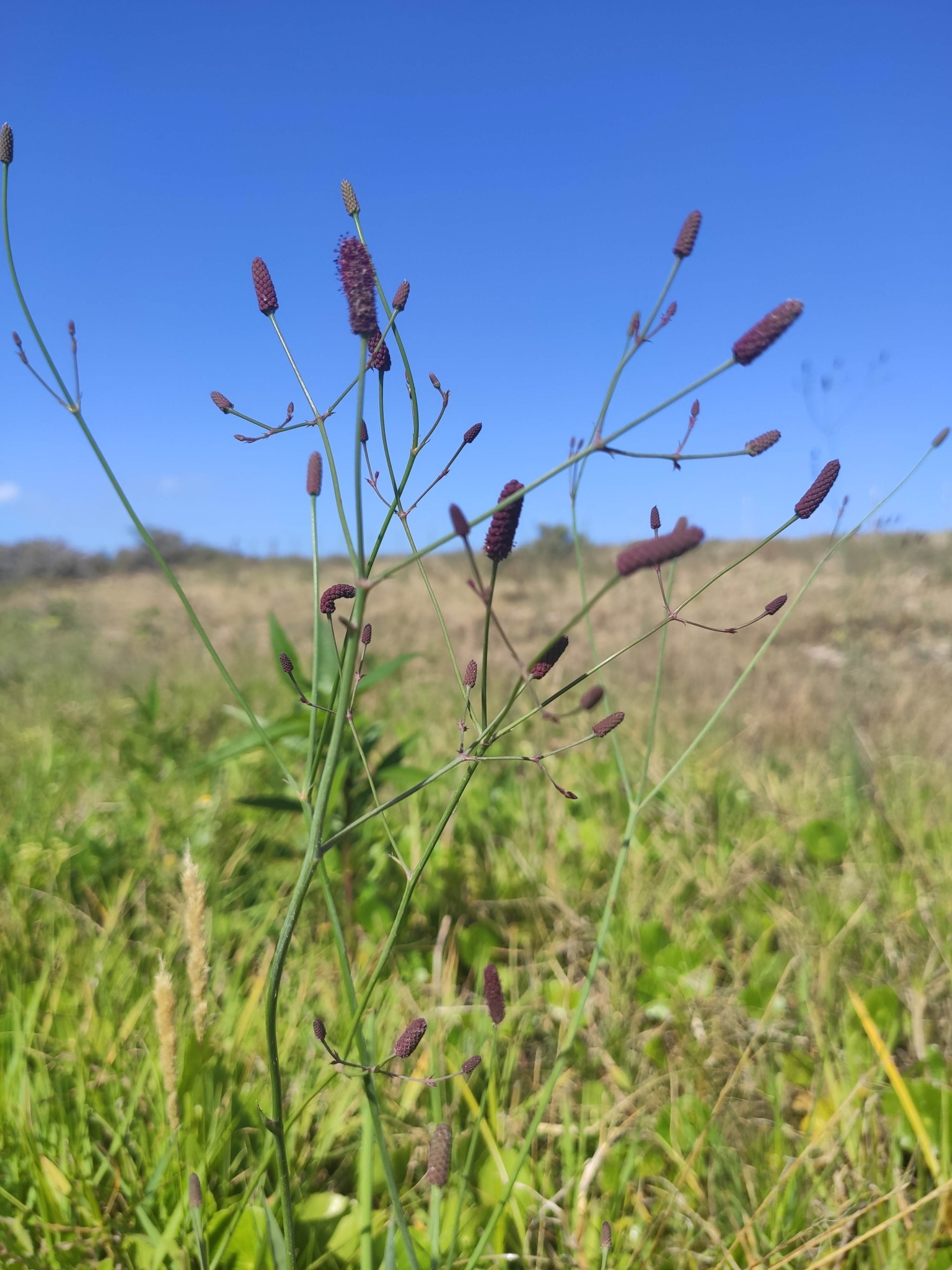

Scientific classification
- Kingdom: Plantae
- Clade: Tracheophytes
- Clade: Angiosperms
- Clade: Eudicots
- Clade: Asterids
- Order: Apiales
- Family: Apiaceae
- Genus: Eryngium
- Species: E. ebracteatum

Binomial name
- Eryngium ebracteatum Lam.

= Eryngium ebracteatum =

Species of plant

Eryngium ebracteatum Lam., the burnet-flowered sea holly, is a herbaceous perennial native to damp grasslands in South America. The species is occasionally cultivated as an ornamental plant.

== Etymology ==
The specific epithet 'ebracteatum' is derived from the Latin 'e' without and 'bracteatus' bracts. This is notable as the most frequently cultivated Old World Eryngiums such as E. alpinum and E. planum are known for their conspicuous bristly or spiny bracts.

== Taxonomy ==
Eryngium ebracteatum was described in 1797 by the French naturalist Jean-Baptiste Lamark (Lam.). This species is a member of the subgenus Monocotyloidea which includes most New World species. Within Monocotyloidea E. ebracteatum is part of a group of South American species with inconspicuous involucral bracts. Its closest relatives are the Argentinian species E. incantatum Lucena, Novara & Cuezzo. and Brazilian species E. balansae H.Wolff.

== Morphology ==
Eryngium ebracteatum is an evergreen herbaceous perennial growing to a height of 1.5 meters. The species has grey-green lance shaped leaves which in contrast to other South American Eryngium are almost or entirely spineless. The inflorescences, which are cone shaped and deep-red are held on wiry branching stems, due to the absence of bracts and reddish color they are often confused with sanguisorba L. species such as S. tenuifolia Fisch. ex Link. and S. officinalis L. E. ebracteatum has underground storage organs and long taproots with little branching. The glaucous leaves of this plant are a result of a covering of epicuticular waxes, the particular arrangement of these wax crystals makes the leaves ultrahydrophobic. In plants this adaptation is known as the lotus effect, and it thought to aid in the removal of dust and soil particles from the leaves which may contain pathogens or reduce photosynthesis.

== Distribution and habitat ==
Eryngium ebracteatum is widely distributed in South and Central America, including Brazil, Costa Rica, Paraguay, Uruguay and Venezuela. It is native to undegraded frequently flooding pampas as well as humid mesophytic meadows, the species is found at elevations of 130 to 1600 meters.

== Conservation ==
The conservation status of E. ebracteatum has not been locally evaluated within Colombia, nor has its global threat level been assessed. Despite this, it is known to have a wide distribution across South America so is resilient to local threats. In contrast, its habitat is at risk due to invasive species, especially herbaceous perennials in the Asteraceae, Poaceae and Fabaceae families. These plants have often been imported for the horticultural trade and then spread to natural environments.

== Cultivation ==
The most frequently cultivated species of the genus Eryngium are in the subgenus Eryngium (native to rocky and coastal areas). The New World grassland species are cultivated less often but are gaining popularity due to their fit within the naturalistic planting movement. In cultivation, Eryngium ebracteatum requires full sun and moderately fertile soil. Despite being native to wet areas, it is prone to root and crown rot if it receives a combination of low temperatures and waterlogged soil. Most specimens of Eryngium ebracteatum cultivated are of the variety 'poterioides'.
