= Eupithecia limbata =

Scientific classification
- Domain: Eukaryota
- Kingdom: Animalia
- Phylum: Arthropoda
- Class: Insecta
- Order: Lepidoptera
- Family: Geometridae
- Genus: Eupithecia
- Species: E. limbata

Binomial name
- Eupithecia limbata Staudinger, 1879

Synonyms
- Eupithecia irritaria Staudinger, 1892; Eupithecia kueppersi Vojnits, 1973; Tephroclystia tomillata Chretien, 1904; Eupithecia occidens Wehrli, 1927

Species of moth

Eupithecia limbata is a moth in the family Geometridae. It is found in Italy, France, Slovenia, North Macedonia, Greece and Bulgaria. It is also found in Iran.

The larvae feed on Eryngium amethystinum.

== Subspecies ==
- Eupithecia limbata limbata
- Eupithecia limbata tomillata (Chretien, 1904)
