= Eryngium castrense =

Scientific classification
- Kingdom: Plantae
- Clade: Tracheophytes
- Clade: Angiosperms
- Clade: Eudicots
- Clade: Asterids
- Order: Apiales
- Family: Apiaceae
- Genus: Eryngium
- Species: E. castrense

Binomial name
- Eryngium castrense Jeps.

Species of flowering plant in the celery family

Eryngium castrense is a species of flowering plant in the family Apiaceae known by the common name Great Valley eryngo, or Great Valley button celery. This plant is endemic to California, where it grows in wet areas such as vernal pools and ponds in the central part of the state. This is a heavily branched, spiny perennial herb reaching maximum heights of around half a meter. It produces light green to grayish green hairless stems with occasional lobed, oval-shaped leaves. At the tops of the stems are flower heads 1–1.5 centimeters (0.4–0.6 in) wide and rounded or egg-shaped. At the base of each head is an array of 7 to 9 spiny, pointed bracts up to three centimeters long, and sometimes a few smaller bractlets above. The rounded flower head contains many small white to light purple flowers.
