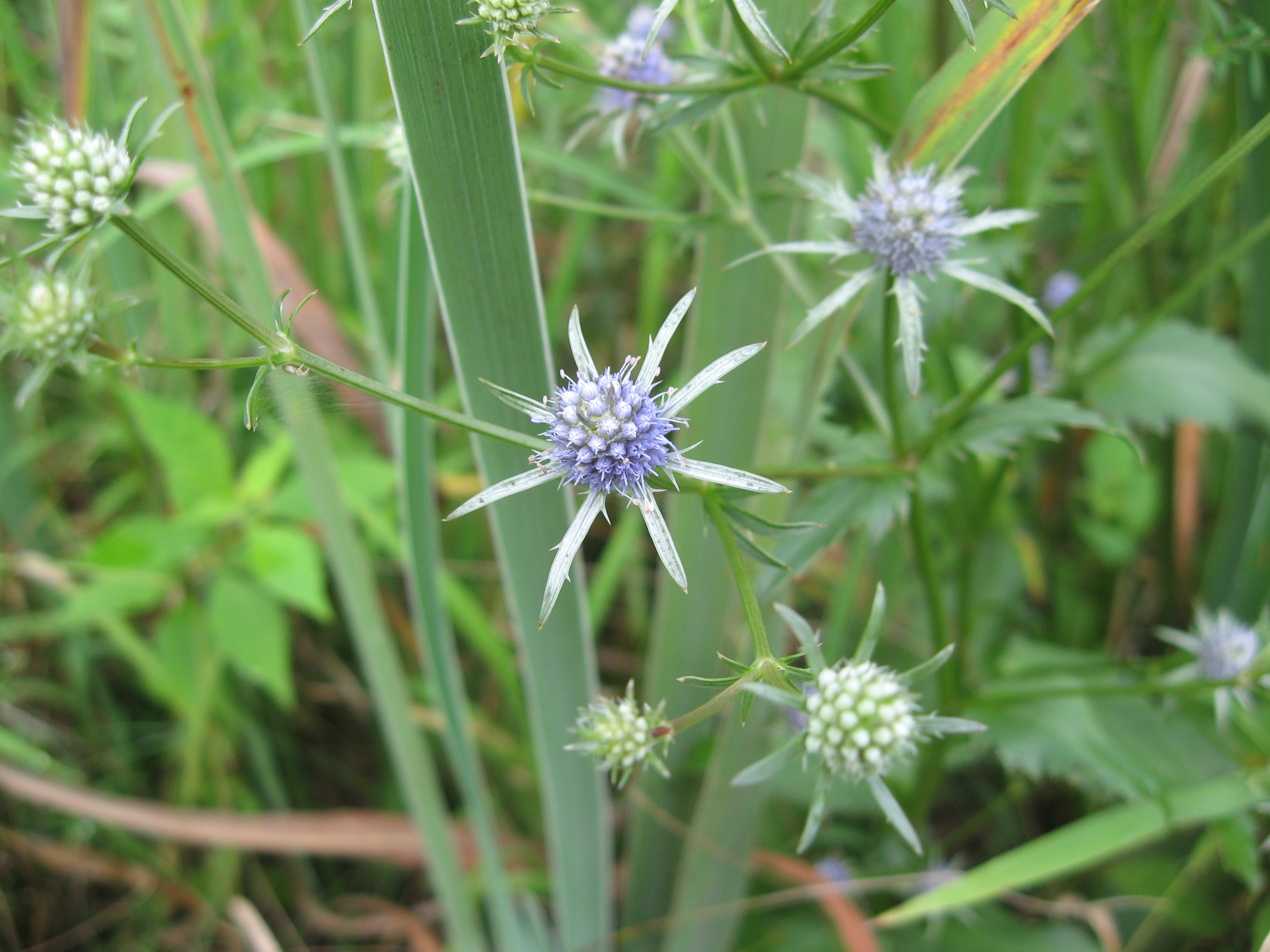

Scientific classification
- Kingdom: Plantae
- Clade: Tracheophytes
- Clade: Angiosperms
- Clade: Eudicots
- Clade: Asterids
- Order: Apiales
- Family: Apiaceae
- Genus: Eryngium
- Species: E. integrifolium

Binomial name
- Eryngium integrifolium Walter

= Eryngium integrifolium =

Species of flowering plant in the celery family

Eryngium integrifolium, also known as blueflower eryngo, savanna eryngo, or blue-flowered coyote thistle, is a flowering plant in the family Apiaceae. It is native to the Southeastern United States where it is found it meadows, savannas, and flatwoods often in wet, nutrient-poor conditions. It produces dense heads of blue flowers in late summer through fall.
