= Eryngium baldwinii =

Scientific classification
- Kingdom: Plantae
- Clade: Tracheophytes
- Clade: Angiosperms
- Clade: Eudicots
- Clade: Asterids
- Order: Apiales
- Family: Apiaceae
- Genus: Eryngium
- Species: E. baldwinii

Binomial name
- Eryngium baldwinii Spreng.

Species of plant

Eryngium baldwinii is a biennial aromatic herb in the Eryngium genus. Its common name is Baldwin's eryngo. It is named for William Baldwin. A ground cover it grows in the Southeastern United States.

Ethnobotanist Dan Austin reports that it was used as breath freshener with aphrodisiac qualities and in an edible form was known as "kissing comfits". It is in the family Apiaceae along with parsley, celery, and carrot. Several other species of Eryngium are related.

== Description ==
Eryngium baldwinii can grow to become a spread out groundcover with hazy appearing, dark to light blue flowers. These flowers are approximately 8 millimeters long and 4 millimeters wide. The leaves of E. baldwinii may be any of the following shapes: oblong, ovate, lanceolate, entire, cleft, dentate, or pinnatifid. They are approximately 2.5 centimeters wide and 7 centimeters long.

== Distribution and habitat ==
E. baldwinii grows in much of Florida, as well as parts of Alabama and Georgia. It prefers lots of sun and moist to wet soil. As such, it has been observed growing in habitat types such as fresh to brackish marshes, bogs, and wet pine flatwoods.
