= Eryngium jaliscense =

Scientific classification
- Kingdom: Plantae
- Clade: Tracheophytes
- Clade: Angiosperms
- Clade: Eudicots
- Clade: Asterids
- Order: Apiales
- Family: Apiaceae
- Genus: Eryngium
- Species: E. jaliscense

Binomial name
- Eryngium jaliscense Mathias and Constance

Species of flowering plant in the celery family

Eryngium jaliscense is a plant species native to the Mexican State of Jalisco. It grows in scattered populations in pine forests and other shaded slopes at elevations of 1,200–1,600 m (3,900–5,200 ft).

Eryngium jaliscense is a perennial with a single stem up to 140 cm (55 in) tall. Leaves are long and linear, tapering toward the tip and with long hairs along the margins. Basal leaves are up to 55 cm (22 in) long but less than 1 cm (0.39 in) across. Leaves along the stem are similar but not as long. Flowers are whitish, grouped into heads, the heads arranged like a cyme.
