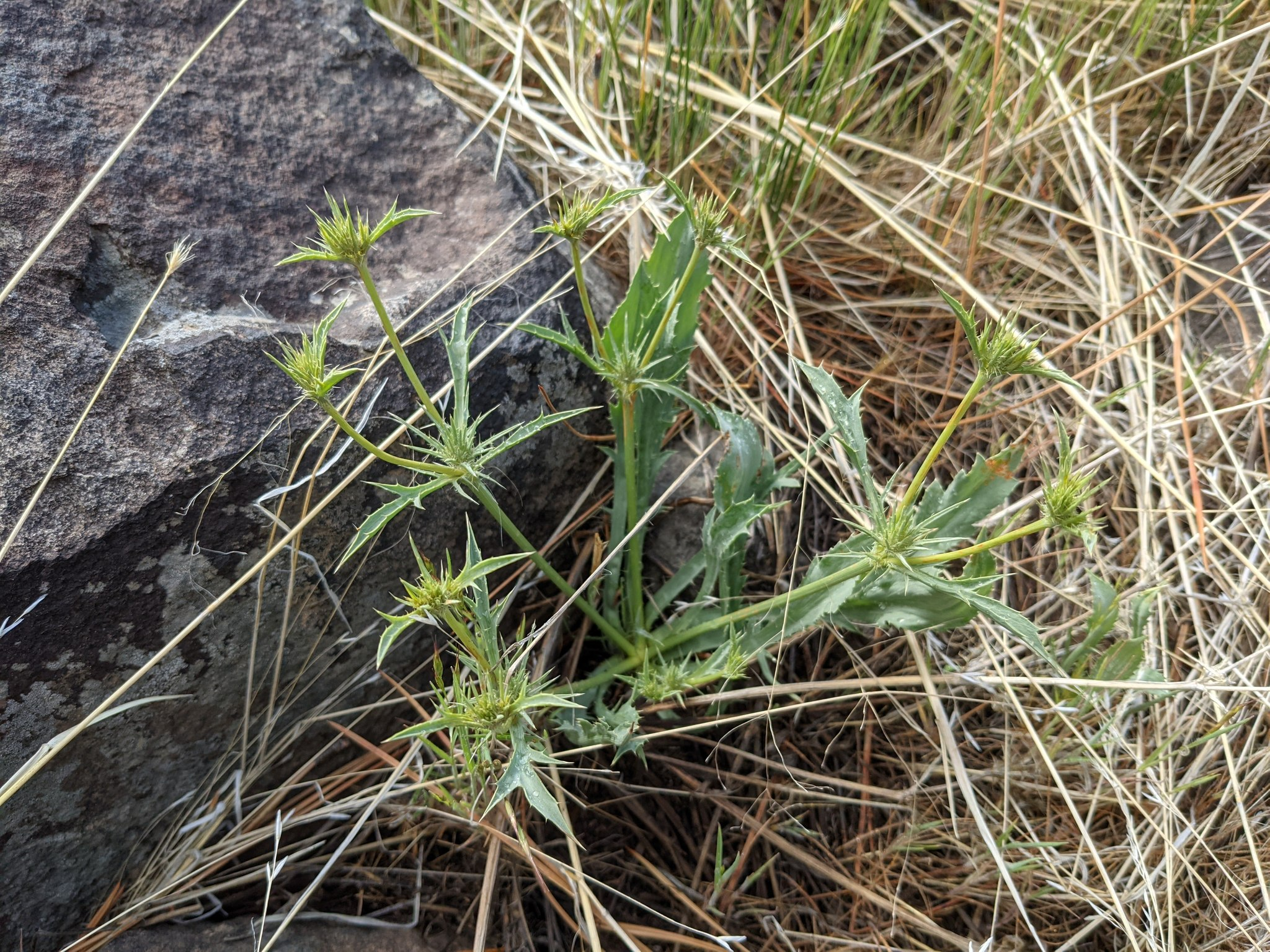

Conservation status
- Vulnerable (NatureServe)

Scientific classification
- Kingdom: Plantae
- Clade: Embryophytes
- Clade: Tracheophytes
- Clade: Spermatophytes
- Clade: Angiosperms
- Clade: Eudicots
- Clade: Asterids
- Order: Apiales
- Family: Apiaceae
- Genus: Eryngium
- Species: E. mathiasiae

Binomial name
- Eryngium mathiasiae M.Y.Sheikh

= Eryngium mathiasiae =

Species of flowering plant in the celery family

Eryngium mathiasiae is a species of flowering plant in the family Apiaceae known by the common name Mathias' eryngo, or Mathias' button celery.

The plant was named for American botanist Mildred Esther Mathias of California.

It is endemic to the Modoc Plateau of northeastern California, where it grows in the vernal pools of the local river drainages, and other wet areas such as ditches.

== Description ==
Eryngium mathiasiae is an erect perennial herb 30 to 40 centimeters (12 to 16 in) tall. There is a basal rosette of long lance-shaped leaves, the blades up to 17 centimeters (6.7 in) long and lined with sharp-pointed serrations or lobes, borne on petioles several centimeters in length.

The inflorescence is an array of flower heads, each surrounded by sharp, spined bracts. The greenish flower heads bloom in small, white petals.

== Taxonomy ==
Eryngium mathiasiae was described as a species and named in 1983 by Muhammad Yusuf Sheikh. It is part of the genus Eryngium which is classified in the Apiaceae family and has no subspecies or botanical synonyms.
