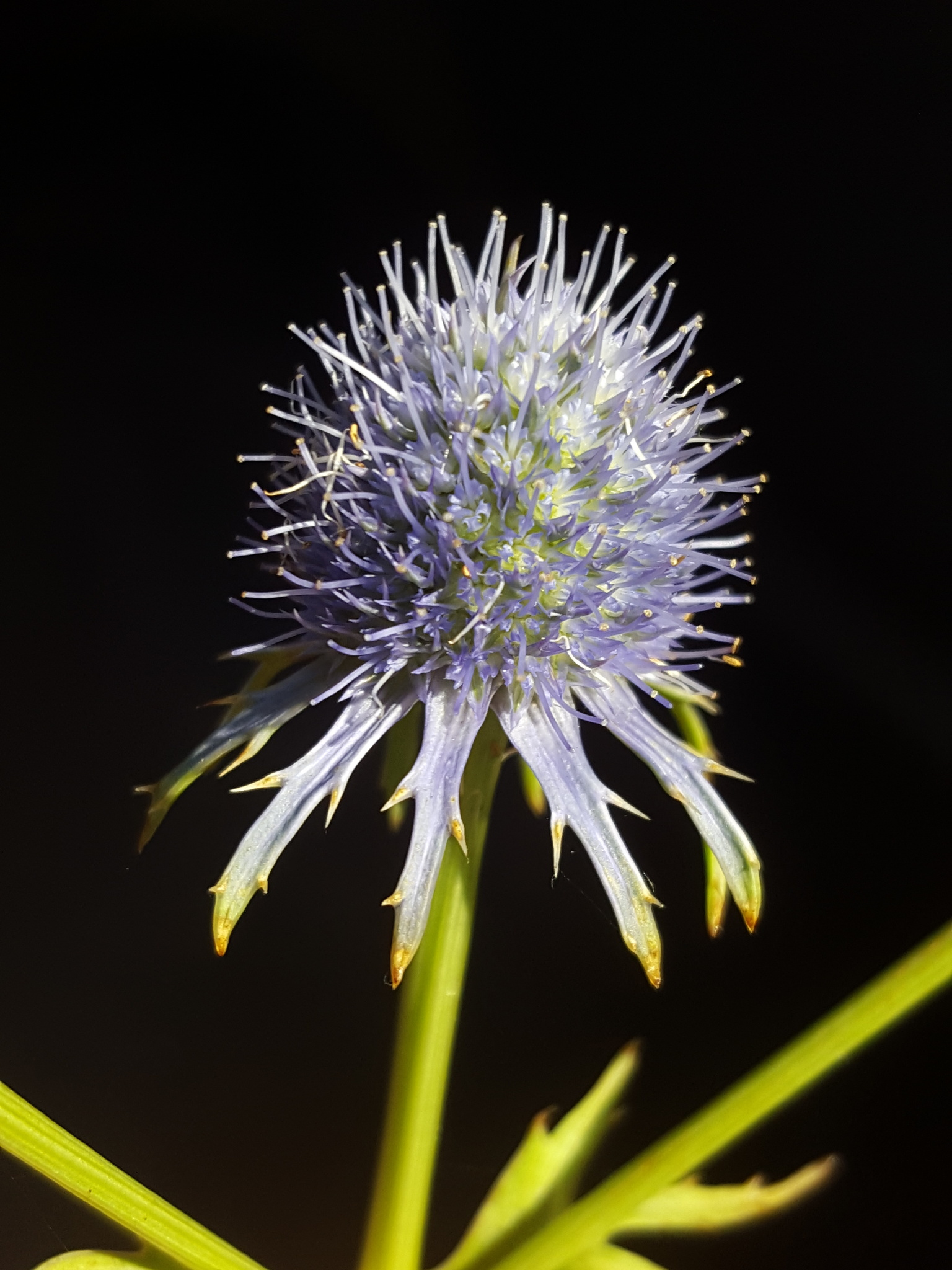
- Eryngium aquaticum

Conservation status
- Apparently Secure (NatureServe)

Scientific classification
- Kingdom: Plantae
- Clade: Tracheophytes
- Clade: Angiosperms
- Clade: Eudicots
- Clade: Asterids
- Order: Apiales
- Family: Apiaceae
- Genus: Eryngium
- Species: E. aquaticum

Binomial name
- Eryngium aquaticum L.

Synonyms
- Eryngium aquaticum Michx. nom. illeg.; Eryngium floridanum J.M.Coult. & Rose; Eryngium foetidum Walter nom. illeg.; Eryngium plukenetii Elliott; Eryngium praealtum A.Gray; Eryngium virginianum Elliott; Eryngium virginianum Lam.

= Eryngium aquaticum =

Rattlesnakemaster

Species of flowering plant in the celery family

Eryngium aquaticum is a species of flowering plant in the family Apiaceae known by the common name rattlesnakemaster, marsh rattlesnake master, corn-snakeroot, bitter snakeroot, and marsh eryngo. This plant is native to eastern North America.

This biennial or perennial herb grows up to 2 meters (6 ft 7 in) tall. The ribbed, erect stem branches toward the top. There are alternately arranged leaves which are lance-shaped and toothed on the edges. The basal leaves may be up to 90 centimeters (35 in) long by 9 cm (3.5 in) wide. The inflorescence contains white to blue flower heads with spiny, blue-tinged bracts.

In the wild this plant grows in wet soils, such as those by bogs, marshes, and ditches. It tolerates saturated soils and periodic flooding.

This plant had a number of medicinal uses for Native American groups. The Cherokee people used it for nausea. The Choctaw people used it as a remedy for snakebite and gonorrhea, and the Delaware people used it for intestinal worms. Many groups made it into tea to treat gastrointestinal complaints. The Koasati attributed magical powers to the plant.

This plant is used in flower arranging and as an ornamental garden plant. However, most plants sold under the name E. aquaticum are actually specimens of Eryngium yuccifolium.
