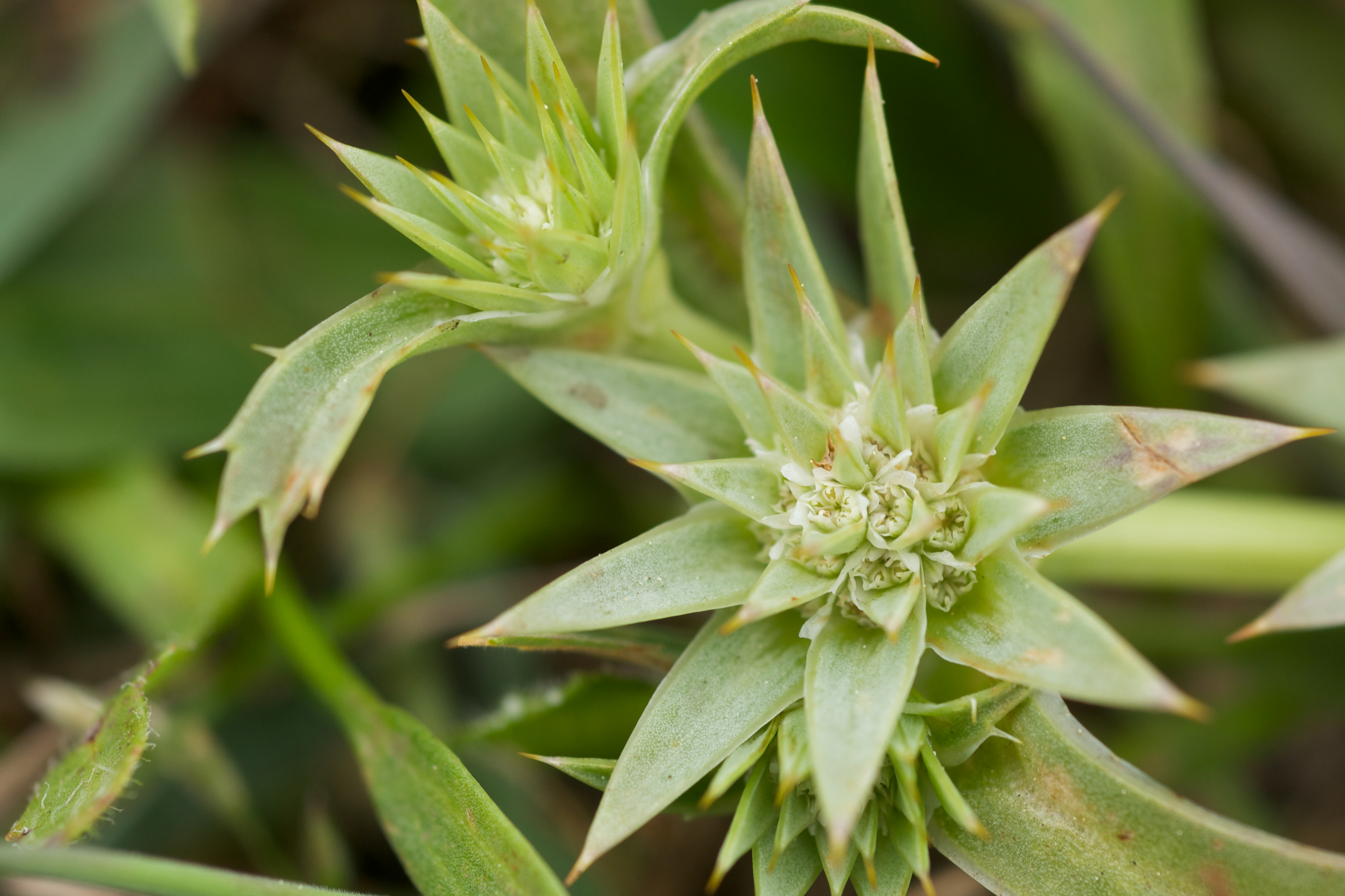

Scientific classification
- Kingdom: Plantae
- Clade: Tracheophytes
- Clade: Angiosperms
- Clade: Eudicots
- Clade: Asterids
- Order: Apiales
- Family: Apiaceae
- Genus: Eryngium
- Species: E. armatum

Binomial name
- Eryngium armatum (S.Wats.) J.M.Coult. & Rose

= Eryngium armatum =

Species of flowering plant in the celery family

Eryngium armatum, known by the common names coastal eryngo and prickly coyote thistle, is a species of flowering plant in the family Apiaceae.

It is endemic to the coastline of northern and central California, where it grows along beaches and coastal bluffs. Many populations are in the San Francisco Bay Area.

== Description ==
Eryngium armatum is a low perennial herb growing patches of thick green to yellow-green leaves, each long and straight, sometimes with serrated or toothed edges.

Atop stout stems are inflorescences of spiky flower heads each nearly a centimeter wide. Each is surrounded by seven or eight long, sharp-pointed bracts about two centimeters long, and sometimes more layers of bractlets on top. The tiny white to purplish flowers are tucked between the layers of bracts.
