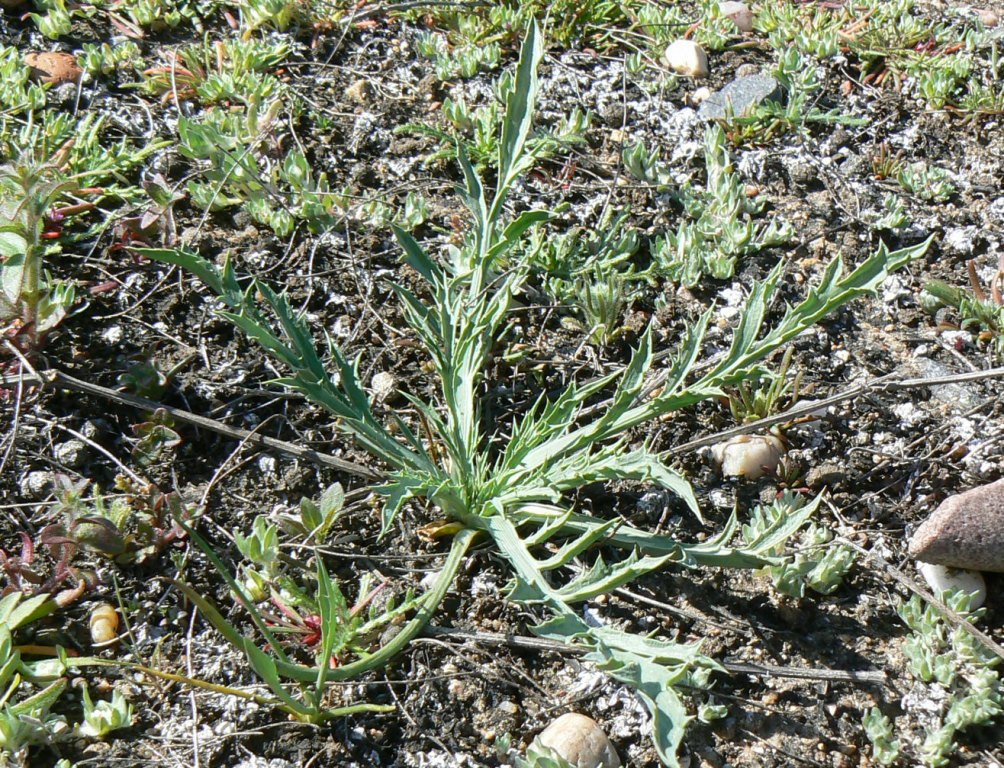
- var. parishii

Conservation status
- Secure (NatureServe)

Scientific classification
- Kingdom: Plantae
- Clade: Tracheophytes
- Clade: Angiosperms
- Clade: Eudicots
- Clade: Asterids
- Order: Apiales
- Family: Apiaceae
- Genus: Eryngium
- Species: E. aristulatum

Binomial name
- Eryngium aristulatum Jeps.

= Eryngium aristulatum =

Species of flowering plant in the celery family

Eryngium aristulatum, known by the common names California eryngo and Jepson's button celery, is a species of flowering plant in the family Apiaceae.

== Distribution ==
This plant is native to California and Baja California where it grows in wet places, such as vernal pools and flooded meadows. It is found in coast redwood forest, California mixed evergreen forest, California foothill oak woodland, yellow pine forest, chaparral, coastal sage scrub, coastal salt marsh, and wetland-riparian habitats.

== Description ==
Eryngium aristulatum is a perennial herb with erect, rounded, naked stems, occasionally branching and reaching anywhere from 10 centimetres (3.9 in) to nearly 1 metre (3.3 ft) in height.

Leaves appear near the base and at nodes along the stem and are long and serrated to toothed.

The inflorescence holds rounded flowers with five to eight long, straight, spiky bracts which often have spiny edges and may grow nearly 3 centimeters long. The flower contains white petals and white or purple styles. The blooming period is June through August.

=== Varieties ===
Named varieties include:

- Eryngium aristulatum var. aristulatum – California eryngo, Jepson's button celery; primarily found in San Francisco Bay Area.
- Eryngium aristulatum var. hooveri – Hoover's button celery, Hoover's eryngo; native to the Southern California Coast Ranges; a state listed Critically endangered species.
- Eryngium aristulatum var. parishii – San Diego button celery, San Diego eryngo; primarily found in vernal pools of Coastal sage scrub habitats within San Diego County; a state and federally listed Endangered species.
