= Eryngium vaseyi =

Conservation status
- Secure (NatureServe)

Scientific classification
- Kingdom: Plantae
- Clade: Tracheophytes
- Clade: Angiosperms
- Clade: Eudicots
- Clade: Asterids
- Order: Apiales
- Family: Apiaceae
- Genus: Eryngium
- Species: E. vaseyi

Binomial name
- Eryngium vaseyi J.M.Coult. & Rose

Species of flowering plant in the celery family

Eryngium vaseyi is a species of flowering plant in the family Apiaceae. It is endemic to California. The specific epithet vaseyi honors the American plant collector George Richard Vasey (not to be confused with his father George Vasey), who made extensive collections in the region in 1880 and 1881. The species is commonly called Vasey's coyote-thistle.

== Description ==
Eryngium vaseyi is a decumbent to upright perennial herb with spreading branches up to half a meter long. The lance-shaped to oblong leaves may be up to 24 centimeters (9.4 in) long. The edges are deeply cut into narrow, sharp-pointed lobes. The inflorescence is an array of somewhat rounded flower heads surrounded by several narrow, pointed bracts with spiny edges. The head blooms in whitish petals.

== Taxonomy ==
Eryngium vaseyi was named and described by the American botanists John Merle Coulter and Joseph Nelson Rose in 1888. The type specimen was collected by George Richard Vasey along the San Antonio River in Monterey County, California, in 1880. As of January 2025, Eryngium vaseyi J.M.Coult. & Rose is a widely accepted name.

== Distribution and habitat ==
Eryngium vaseyi is endemic to California, where it is known from vernal pools and similar wet habitat in the Central Valley and certain areas of the Central Coast Ranges and southern California coast.

== Bibliography ==
- Coulter, John M.; Rose, J. N. (1888). "Some notes on western Umbelliferae II". Botanical Gazette. 13 (6): 141–146. doi:10.1086/326284.
