= Eryngium pinnatisectum =

Conservation status
- Imperiled (NatureServe)

Scientific classification
- Kingdom: Plantae
- Clade: Tracheophytes
- Clade: Angiosperms
- Clade: Eudicots
- Clade: Asterids
- Order: Apiales
- Family: Apiaceae
- Genus: Eryngium
- Species: E. pinnatisectum

Binomial name
- Eryngium pinnatisectum Jeps.

Species of flowering plant in the celery family

Eryngium pinnatisectum is an uncommon species of flowering plant in the family Apiaceae, known by the common names Tuolumne eryngo and Tuolumne button celery.

== Distribution ==
The annual or perennial herb is endemic to central California, within areas of Sacramento County, Amador County, Calaveras County, and Tuolumne County.

It is known from the eastern Central Valley, and adjacent lower Sierra Nevada foothills.

It is a plant of wetlands, in vernal pools, foothill oak woodland (Cismontane woodland), yellow pine forest (Lower montane coniferous forest), freshwater wetlands, and wetland-riparian habitats.

== Description ==
Eryngium pinnatisectum is an erect perennial herb growing up to 0.5 metres (1.6 ft) tall. It has a thick, hairless pale green branching stem.

The greenish-white leaves are long and very narrow, lance-shaped with several sharp lobes, reaching 30 centimeters long.

The inflorescence is an array of spherical flower heads, each surrounded by sharp-pointed, narrow bracts with thickened edges. The pale greenish flowers in the globelike head bloom in white petals. The blooming period is May to August.

Conservation

The plant is a California Native Plant Society–listed Endangered species.
