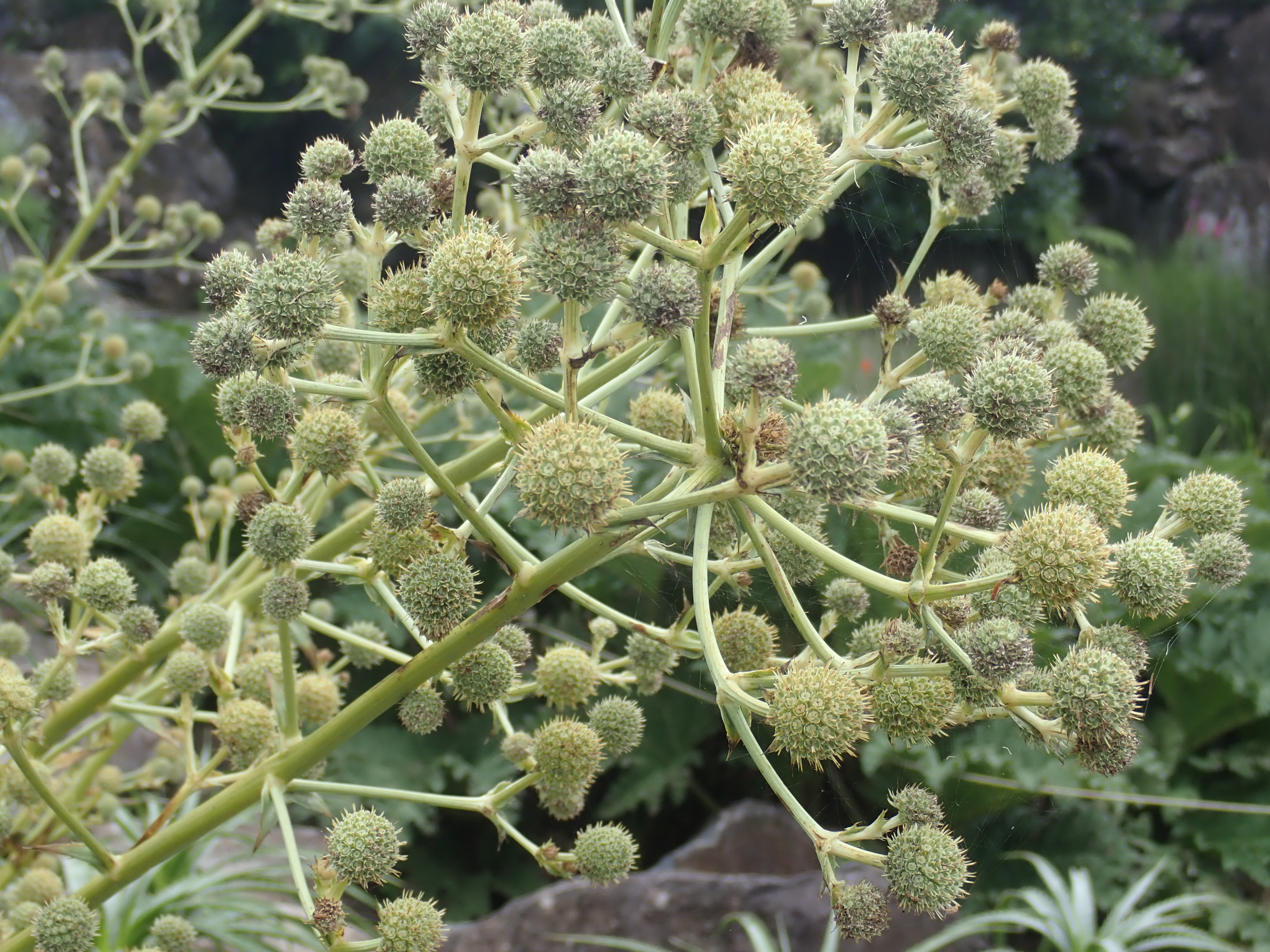
- Mount Tomah Botanical Garden

Scientific classification
- Kingdom: Plantae
- Clade: Tracheophytes
- Clade: Angiosperms
- Clade: Eudicots
- Clade: Asterids
- Order: Apiales
- Family: Apiaceae
- Genus: Eryngium
- Species: E. paniculatum

Binomial name
- Eryngium paniculatum Cav. & Dombey ex F.Delaroche

Synonyms
- Eryngium paniculatum var. chilense DC. Eryngium paniculatum f. junior Urb. Eryngium paniculatum var. litorale G.Kunkel; Eryngium subulatum Vell.

= Eryngium paniculatum =

Species of flowering plant

Eryngium paniculatum is a flowering plant in the carrot family. It is native to Argentina, Brazil, and Chile. It was first described by Antonio José Cavanilles and Joseph Dombey in 1808.

Plants of the World Online accepts this as the species name, while GBIF declares it a synonym of Eryngium humboldtii.
