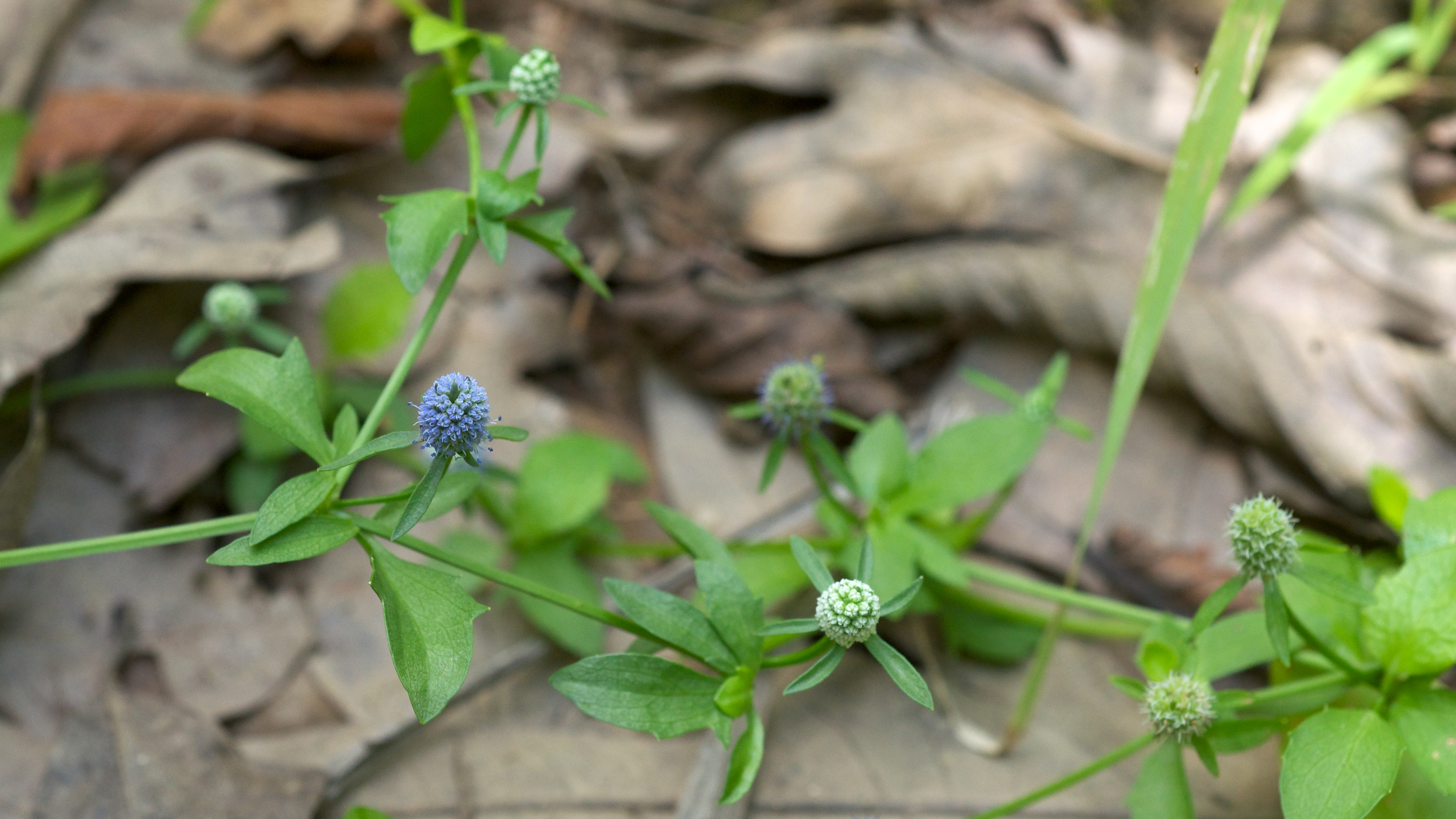

Scientific classification
- Kingdom: Plantae
- Clade: Tracheophytes
- Clade: Angiosperms
- Clade: Eudicots
- Clade: Asterids
- Order: Apiales
- Family: Apiaceae
- Genus: Eryngium
- Species: E. prostratum

Binomial name
- Eryngium prostratum (Nutt. ex. DC.)

= Eryngium prostratum =

Species of flowering plant

Eryngium prostratum, commonly called creeping eryngo, is a species of plant in the family Apiaceae that is native to the southeastern United States.

It is a perennial that produces blue flowers in the summer through frost on herbaceous stems.
