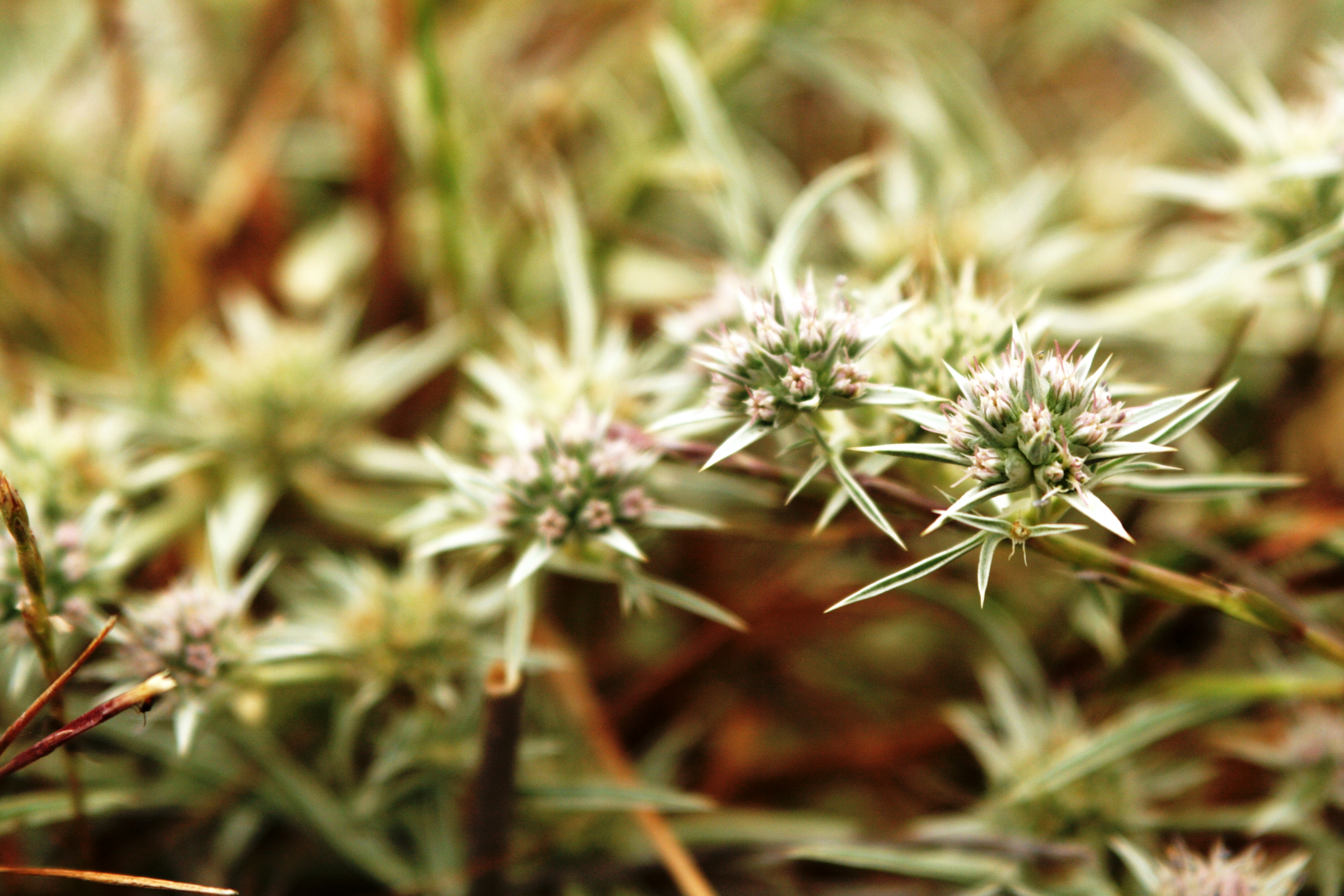

Conservation status
- Critically Imperiled (NatureServe)

Scientific classification
- Kingdom: Plantae
- Clade: Tracheophytes
- Clade: Angiosperms
- Clade: Eudicots
- Clade: Asterids
- Order: Apiales
- Family: Apiaceae
- Genus: Eryngium
- Species: E. pendletonense

Binomial name
- Eryngium pendletonense K.L.Marsden & M.G.Simpson, 1999

= Eryngium pendletonense =

Species of flowering plant in the celery family

Eryngium pendletonense (sometimes spelled E. pendletonensis) is a rare species of flowering plant in the carrot family known by the common name Pendleton button-celery. It is endemic to northern San Diego County, California, where it is known from four occurrences along the coastline between Oceanside and the Orange County border, including land within Camp Pendleton. It grows on vernally moist coastal grassland and coastal sage scrub habitat with clay soils. It was first described as a species in 1999.

This is a squat perennial herb with spreading stems up to 20 centimeters (7.9 in) long with a basal rosette of leaves at the base. The leaves are long and very narrow with abrupt, pointed lobes extending out nearly perpendicular. The leaves may extend out from the base of the plant up to 25 centimeters (9.8 in). Plants may be colonial, with two or more plants growing in a bundle that appears to be one plant at first glance. The inflorescence is a cyme of up to 19 flowers with sharp triangular or lance-shaped bracts around the base. Each flower has white petals measuring 1 millimeter long and sepals which are slightly larger.

This rare plant is threatened by introduced plant species, changes in the hydrology of the habitat, and military activity at Camp Pendleton.
