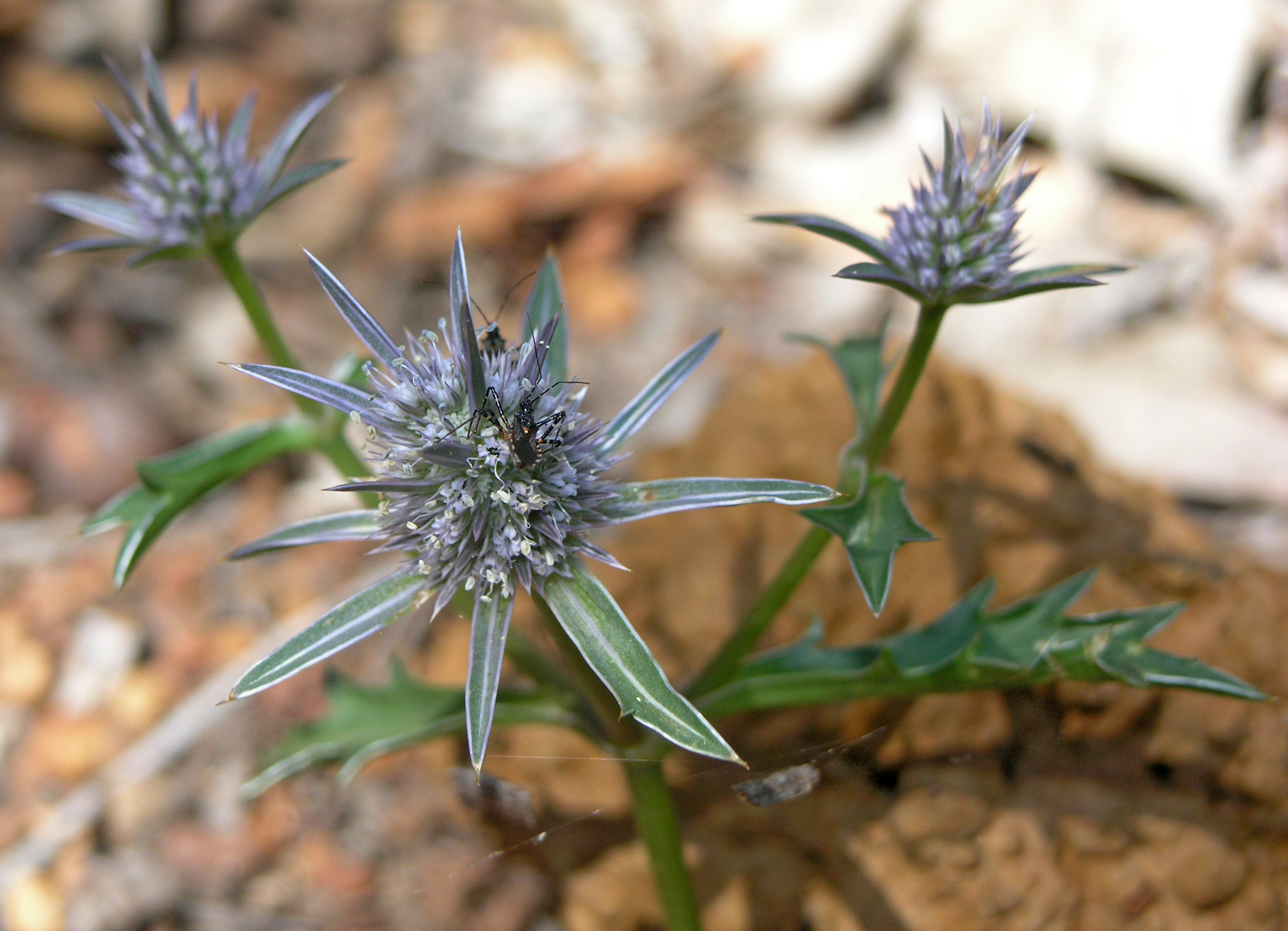
- Flowering at Jarrahdale, Western Australia

Scientific classification
- Kingdom: Plantae
- Clade: Tracheophytes
- Clade: Angiosperms
- Clade: Eudicots
- Clade: Asterids
- Order: Apiales
- Family: Apiaceae
- Genus: Eryngium
- Species: E. pinnatifidum

Binomial name
- Eryngium pinnatifidum Bunge

= Eryngium pinnatifidum =

Species of flowering plant in the celery family

Eryngium pinnatifidum, commonly known as blue devils, is a species of plant in the family Apiaceae. It is endemic to the south-west of Western Australia. It grows up to 50 cm (20 in) in height and produces blue or white flowers between August and November (late winter to late spring) in its native range.

The species was first formally described by botanist Alexander von Bunge, his description published in 1845 in Plantae Preissianae.
