= Eryngium ombrophilum =

Scientific classification
- Kingdom: Plantae
- Clade: Tracheophytes
- Clade: Angiosperms
- Clade: Eudicots
- Clade: Asterids
- Order: Apiales
- Family: Apiaceae
- Genus: Eryngium
- Species: E. ombrophilum

Binomial name
- Eryngium ombrophilum Dusén & H.Wolff

Species of flowering plant in the celery family

Eryngium ombrophilum is a plant species native to Brazil, the type specimen collected there from the State of Paraná.

Eryngium ombrophilum is a perennial semelparous herb. Leaves are thin but firm and rigid. Prophylls 5, lanceolate, the margins spiny and bristly, about 1 cm (0.3 inches) long. Flower head ovoid to cylindrical, 15 mm (0.6 inches) long and 6 mm (0.24 inches) in diameter. Flowers yellow-green.
