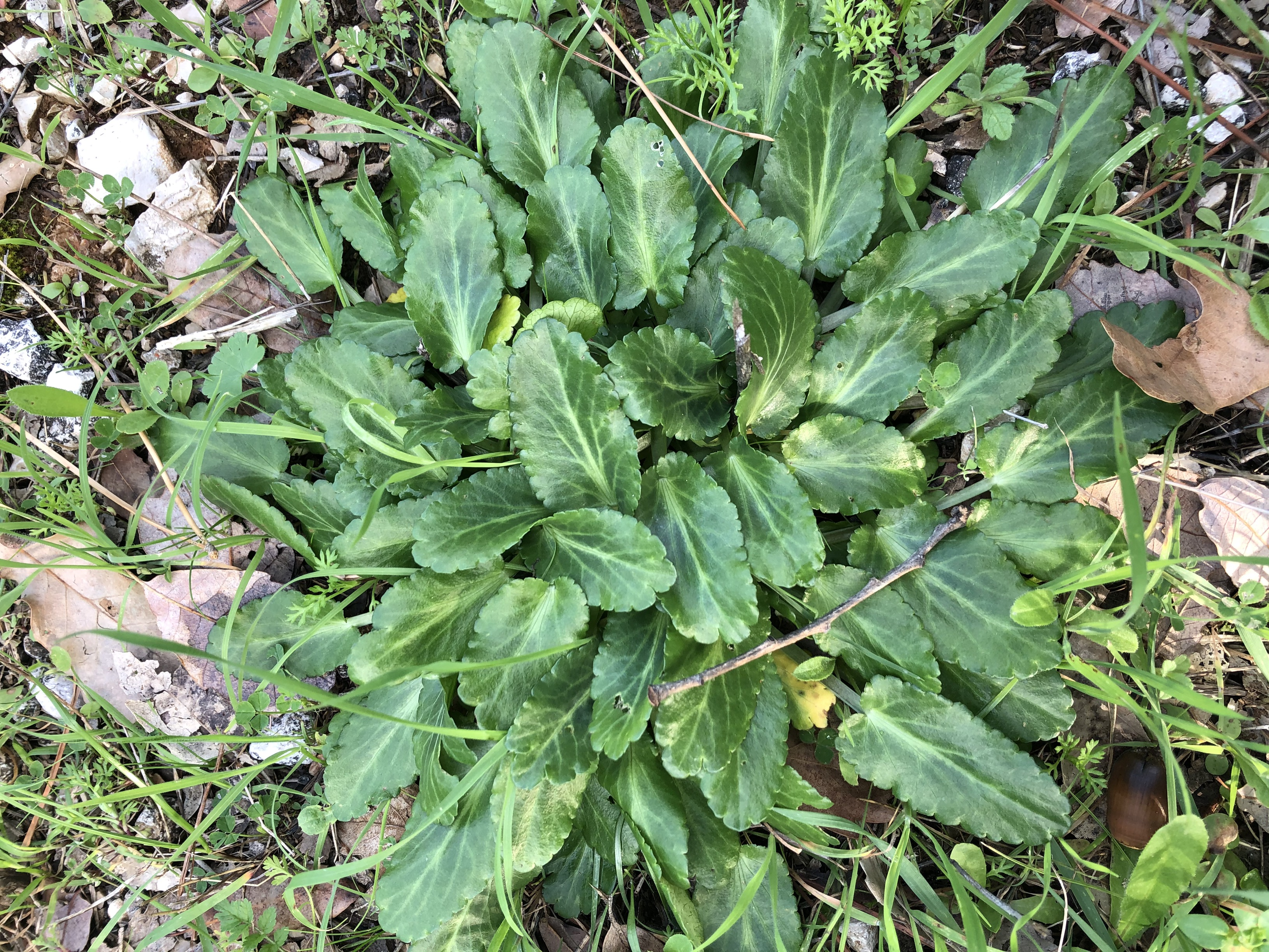

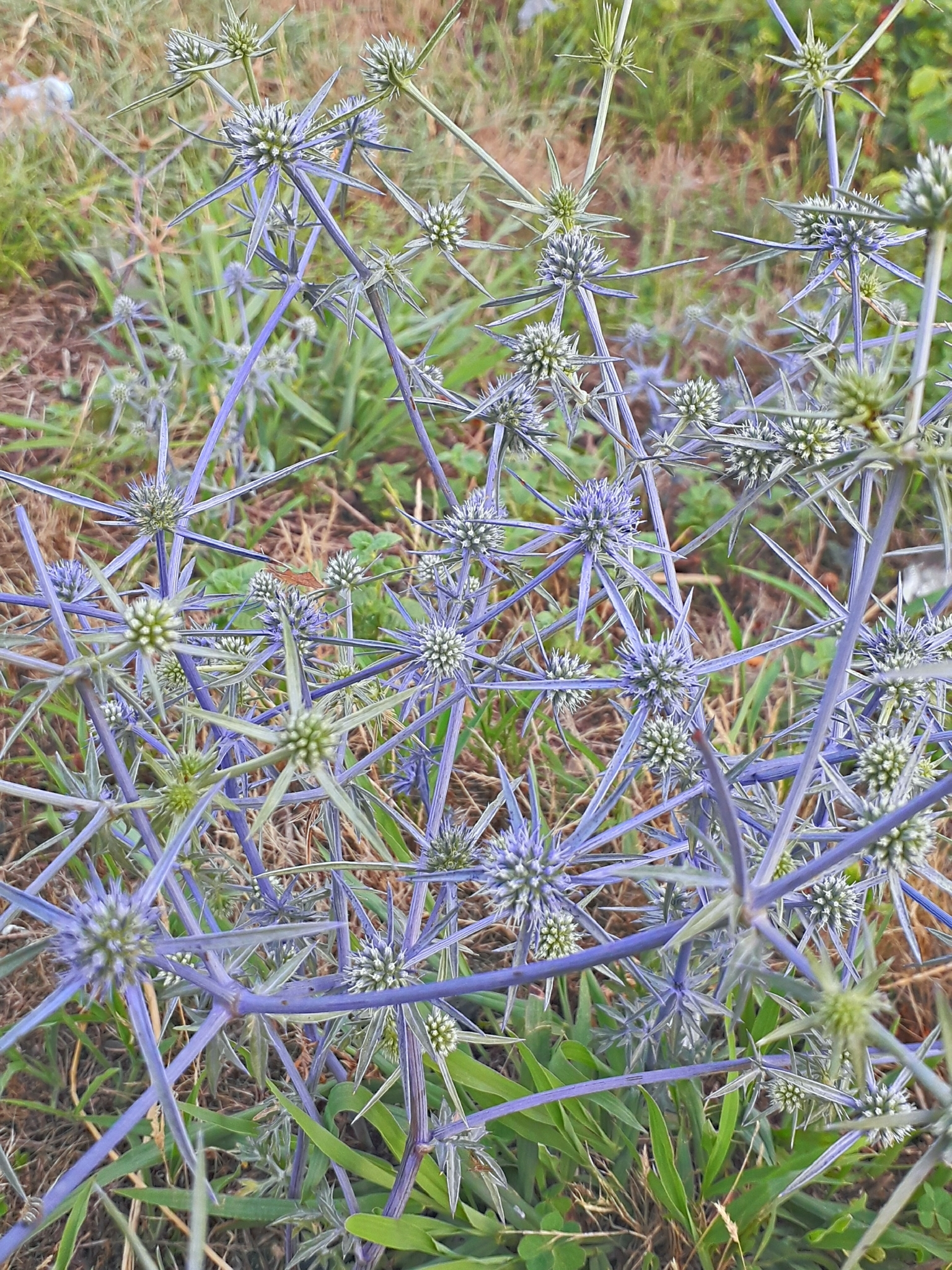
- Eryngnium creticum flowers

Scientific classification
- Kingdom: Plantae
- Clade: Tracheophytes
- Clade: Angiosperms
- Clade: Eudicots
- Clade: Asterids
- Order: Apiales
- Family: Apiaceae
- Genus: Eryngium
- Species: E. creticum

Binomial name
- Eryngium creticum Lam.

= Eryngium creticum =

Species of flowering plant in the carrot family

Eryngium creticum, or the field eryngo, is a species of flowering plant in the family Apiaceae, native to the Northern and Eastern Mediterranean, eastwards to Iran. It is known in Lebanon as قرصعنة.

== Description and Habitat ==
An Eryngo with widely-spreading diffuse display of blue flowers on slender blue branches. The groundmost leaves spread out in a circle and are fairly simple (0-2 smaller lobes may be present), and wither by flowering, the leaves above being of a different kind with more complex, broadish, toothier lobing.

It is easily confused with a number of similar Eryngo—each flowerhead is surrounded by 5(6) slender spine-leaves, and within the head each small flower is attended by a 3-part spine; inflorescence stems are not channeled and the flowers in a head are numerous.

It naturally likes field and path edges, rocky and waste places, and similar habitats.

== Distribution ==
It is native to the Northern and Eastern Mediterranean, eastwards to Iran, and naturalised in some further countries—native in Albania, Bulgaria, Cyprus, East Aegean Is., Egypt, Greece, Iran, Iraq, Italy, Kriti, Lebanon-Syria, NW. Balkan Pen., Palestine, Sinai, Türkiye, Türkiye-in-Europe, and introduced into France.

== Biology ==
It is pollinated by bees, beetles and flies, and tolerates poor soil. It is self-fertile and requires minimal water. The plant is found from October to April and blooms from April to August.

== Etymology ==
The name creticum refers to the island of Crete.

== Uses ==
The plant is used medicinally. Its stems are used to make an anti-tussive tea that is also used for kidney inflammation. It is also used as a remedy for scorpion stings in Jordan and to treat hypoglycemia.
