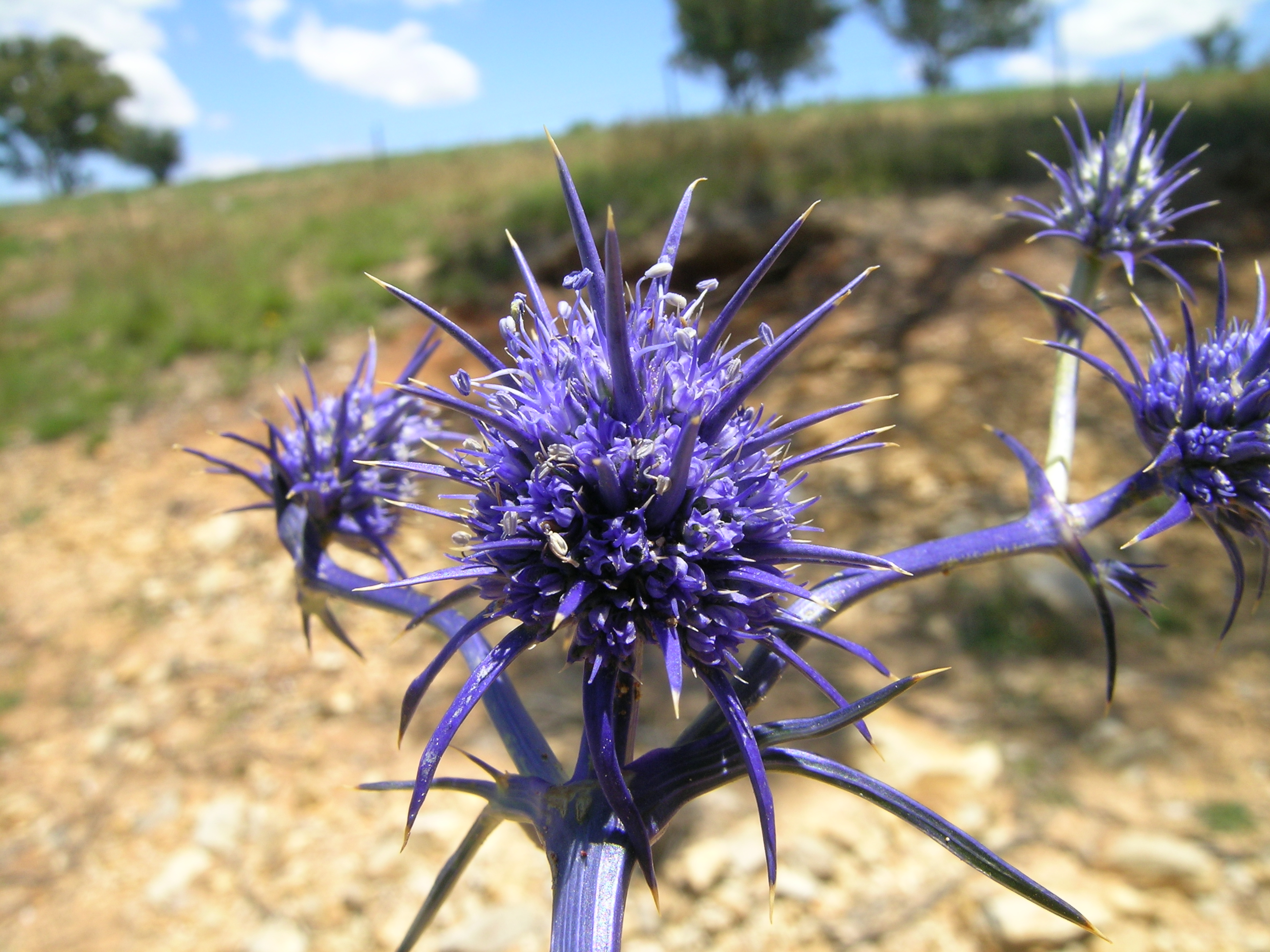

Scientific classification
- Kingdom: Plantae
- Clade: Tracheophytes
- Clade: Angiosperms
- Clade: Eudicots
- Clade: Asterids
- Order: Apiales
- Family: Apiaceae
- Genus: Eryngium
- Species: E. ovinum

Binomial name
- Eryngium ovinum A.Cunn.

= Eryngium ovinum =

Species of flowering plant in the celery family

Eryngium ovinum, commonly known as the blue devil, is a plant species native to Australia.
