= Eryngium racemosum =

Conservation status
- Critically Imperiled (NatureServe)

Scientific classification
- Kingdom: Plantae
- Clade: Tracheophytes
- Clade: Angiosperms
- Clade: Eudicots
- Clade: Asterids
- Order: Apiales
- Family: Apiaceae
- Genus: Eryngium
- Species: E. racemosum

Binomial name
- Eryngium racemosum Jeps.

Species of flowering plant in the celery family

Eryngium racemosum is a rare species of flowering plant in the family Apiaceae known by the common name delta eryngo, or delta button celery.

== Distribution ==
It is endemic to California, where it is known from the Sacramento–San Joaquin River Delta region of the Central Valley up to the rise of the Sierra Nevada foothills. It is a plant of vernally wet and flooded areas near the waterways of the valley, habitat which has been altered and in some areas eliminated by human activity. It is also a member of the flora in the rare alkali sink habitat of the delta. The plant has no federal listing but it is listed as an endangered species on the California state level.

There are 26 reported occurrences of the plant, but several of these have been extirpated. Threats to the species include habitat destruction via alteration of water regimes and water diversion, changes to waterways by dredging and other maintenance activities, conversion of land to agriculture, and non-native plant species. The plant relies on the seasonal flooding that would occur naturally in the delta; this flooding is strictly contained and prevented today.

== Description ==
Eryngium racemosum is a mostly prostrate perennial herb with a slender, branching stem spreading to a maximum length near 0.5 meters (1 ft 8 in). The stem may root at nodes that come in contact with moist soil. The serrated or lobed leaves have blades a few centimeters long and are borne on longer petioles. The inflorescence is a raceme of rounded or oval flower heads, each surrounded by five long, narrow, spiny bracts. The flowers in the head bloom in white or purple-tinged petals in June through September.
