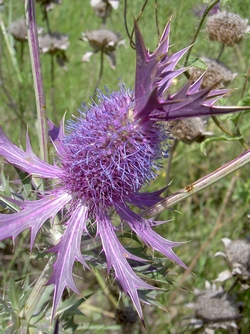

Scientific classification
- Kingdom: Plantae
- Clade: Tracheophytes
- Clade: Angiosperms
- Clade: Eudicots
- Clade: Asterids
- Order: Apiales
- Family: Apiaceae
- Genus: Eryngium
- Species: E. leavenworthii

Binomial name
- Eryngium leavenworthii Torr. & A.Gray

= Eryngium leavenworthii =

Species of flowering plant in the celery family

Eryngium leavenworthii, also known as Leavenworth's eryngo, is an annual plant in the family Apiaceae that is native to the central United States. It can reach heights up to 3 feet. It inhabits dry rocky prairies, roadside fields, open woodlands and waste areas. The plant is mostly found in areas with limestone or chalk soils. Its flowers appear between July and September, although in some areas the flowers may bloom as late as November. The flower ranges in length from 1.5 to 3 inches (38 to 76 mm) and in width approximately 0.5 inches (13 mm). It is frequently mistaken for thistle. The flowers sit atop elongated stems on spiked leaves and form cones of purple or wine colored, tightly clustered blossoms that resemble small fuzzy pineapples. It was named after, Melines Conklin Leavenworth (1796–1862) who is credited with its discovery.
