= Eryngium spinosepalum =

Conservation status
- Imperiled (NatureServe)

Scientific classification
- Kingdom: Plantae
- Clade: Tracheophytes
- Clade: Angiosperms
- Clade: Eudicots
- Clade: Asterids
- Order: Apiales
- Family: Apiaceae
- Genus: Eryngium
- Species: E. spinosepalum

Binomial name
- Eryngium spinosepalum Mathias

Species of flowering plant in the celery family

Eryngium spinosepalum, known by the common names spinysepal eryngo and spiny-sepaled button celery, is an uncommon species of flowering plant in the family Apiaceae.

== Distribution ==
The annual or perennial herb is endemic to California, where it is native to the eastern San Joaquin Valley (southern Central Valley) and adjacent lower Sierra Nevada foothills.

It is a plant of vernal pools, moist grasslands, swales, and similar wetland habitats. It grows at elevations of 100–1,270 metres (330–4,170 ft).

== Description ==
Eryngium spinosepalum is an erect perennial herb growing up to about 75 centimetres (30 in) tall with a thick, hairless branching stem.

The leaves are widely lance-shaped to oblong, edged with sharp, pointed lobes, and up to 35 centimetres (14 in) in length.

The inflorescence is an array of spherical flower heads each up to 2 centimetres (0.79 in) wide and surrounded by several narrow, pointed bracts which may be edged in spines. The heads bloom in white petals, during April and May.
