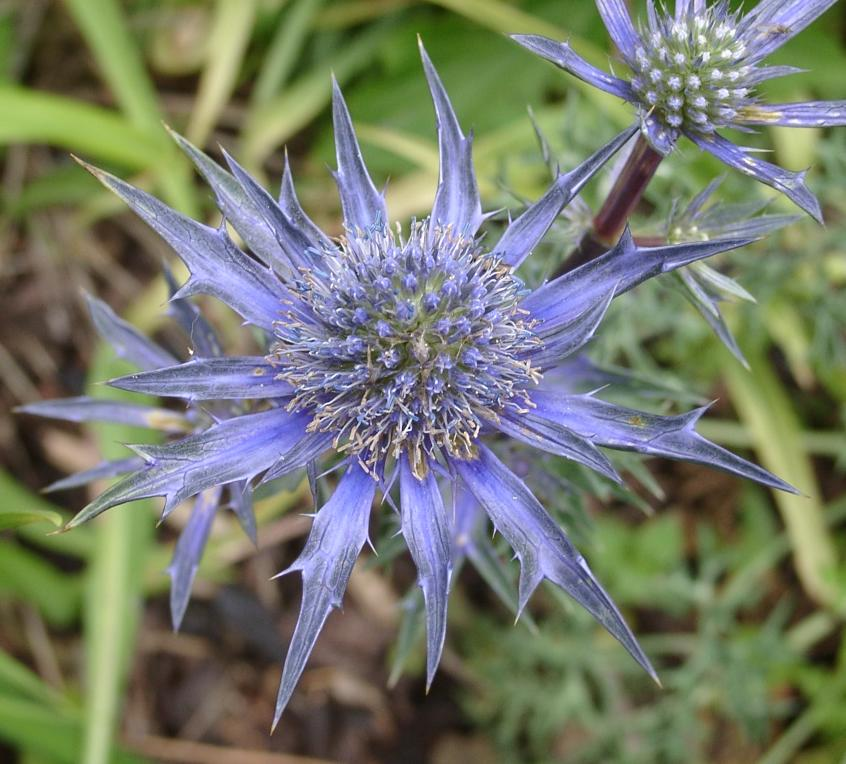
- Eryngium bourgatii

Scientific classification
- Kingdom: Plantae
- Clade: Embryophytes
- Clade: Tracheophytes
- Clade: Angiosperms
- Clade: Eudicots
- Clade: Asterids
- Order: Apiales
- Family: Apiaceae
- Subfamily: Apioideae
- Tribe: Saniculeae
- Genus: Eryngium; Tourn. ex L.

Diversity
- About 250 species

Synonyms
- Atirsita Raf.; Klonion Raf.; Reilia Steud.; Strebanthus Raf.

= Eryngium =

Genus of flowering plants in the celery family

Eryngium is a genus of flowering plants in the family Apiaceae. There are about 250 species. The genus has a cosmopolitan distribution, with centres of diversity in the western Mediterranean, South America and Mexico. Common names include eryngo and sea holly (though not to be confused with true hollies, of the genus Ilex). Less commonly known as sea thistle, although they are not true thistles (family Asteraceae).

These are annual and perennial herbs with hairless and usually spiny leaves. The dome-shaped umbels of steely blue or white flowers have whorls of spiny basal bracts. European and Asian species tend to be native to dry, rocky and coastal areas, and the American species are native to often damp grasslands.

In the language of flowers, they represent admiration.

== Systematics ==
=== Taxonomic history ===
The genus name Eryngium was established by Linnaeus in 1753 where he mentioned eight species, including two from America (E. aquaticum, E. foetidum). Linnaeus, in Genera Plantarum (1754), cited his source of the name Eryngium as being from Joseph Tournefort's Institutiones rei herbariae (1700). The name itself has an Ancient Greek origin as eryggion (ερυγγιον).

Prior to the nomenclatural establishment of Eryngium by Linnaeus, plants that can be recognised as belonging to the genus were mentioned by Theophrastus (371–287 BC), Pedanius Dioscorides (40–90 AD), Otto Brunfels (1532) and Leonhart Fuchs (1543). Early mentions of American species were made by Francisco Hernández de Toledo (1651) and Leonard Plukenet (1692).

After Linnaeus, a major treatment of the genus was made by Jean-Baptiste Lamarck (1798) who mentioned 25 species, and Antonio José Cavanilles (1800, 1801) who described at least seven species, six of which were from America. The first monograph of the genus was by François-Étienne de La Roche (1808), which covers 50 species. In the 19th century further European and Asian species were described by Pierre Edmond Boissier and Augustin Pyramus de Candolle, and American species by Adelbert von Chamisso, Joseph Decaisne, William Jackson Hooker, August Grisebach, Willis Linn Jepson and Rodolfo Amando Philippi. In 1913 Karl F.A.H. Wolff published a major revision of the genus, discussing 196 species which he allocated to 34 sections while also recognising a division between Old World (Europe and Asia) and New World (America and Australia) species. The understanding of American species was further enhanced by Mildred E. Mathias (1906–1995) and Lincoln Constance (1909–2001) who published a synopsis of North American species (Mathias & Constance 1941) and described a total of 18 species from North and South America.

More recently, Arno Wörz has made a major contribution to the understanding of the genus with his revision of European, Asian and African species (Wörz 2011) and his checklist of all species (Wörz 1999).

=== Evolutionary history ===
It is likely that the genus originated in Eurasia, with a radiation from west to east in subgenus Eryngium, and the western Mediterranean being a primary centre of diversity. The American species are probably derived from a more recent intensive evolution and radiation, possibly from a single trans-Atlantic dispersal and subsequent landfall in southeastern South America where there is a primary diversity centre in southern Brazil and a younger secondary one in Mexico. It is likely that the sword-leaved structure seen in many American species occurred only once in the evolution of the genus. The palmate leaf patterns seen in Eurasian species do not occur in any American species.

=== Classification ===
Wörz (2011) divided the genus into six subgenera, with one subgenus divided into 10 sections:

- subgenus Lessonia
- subgenus Monocotyloidea
- subgenus Semiaquatica
- subgenus Ilicifolia
- subgenus Foetida
- subgenus Eryngium
  - section Alpina
  - section Amethystina
  - section Astrantiifolia
  - section Bourgatiorum
  - section Bungeorum
  - section Eryngium
  - section Gigantophylla
  - section Palmito
  - section Plana
  - section Thorifolia

== Selected species ==
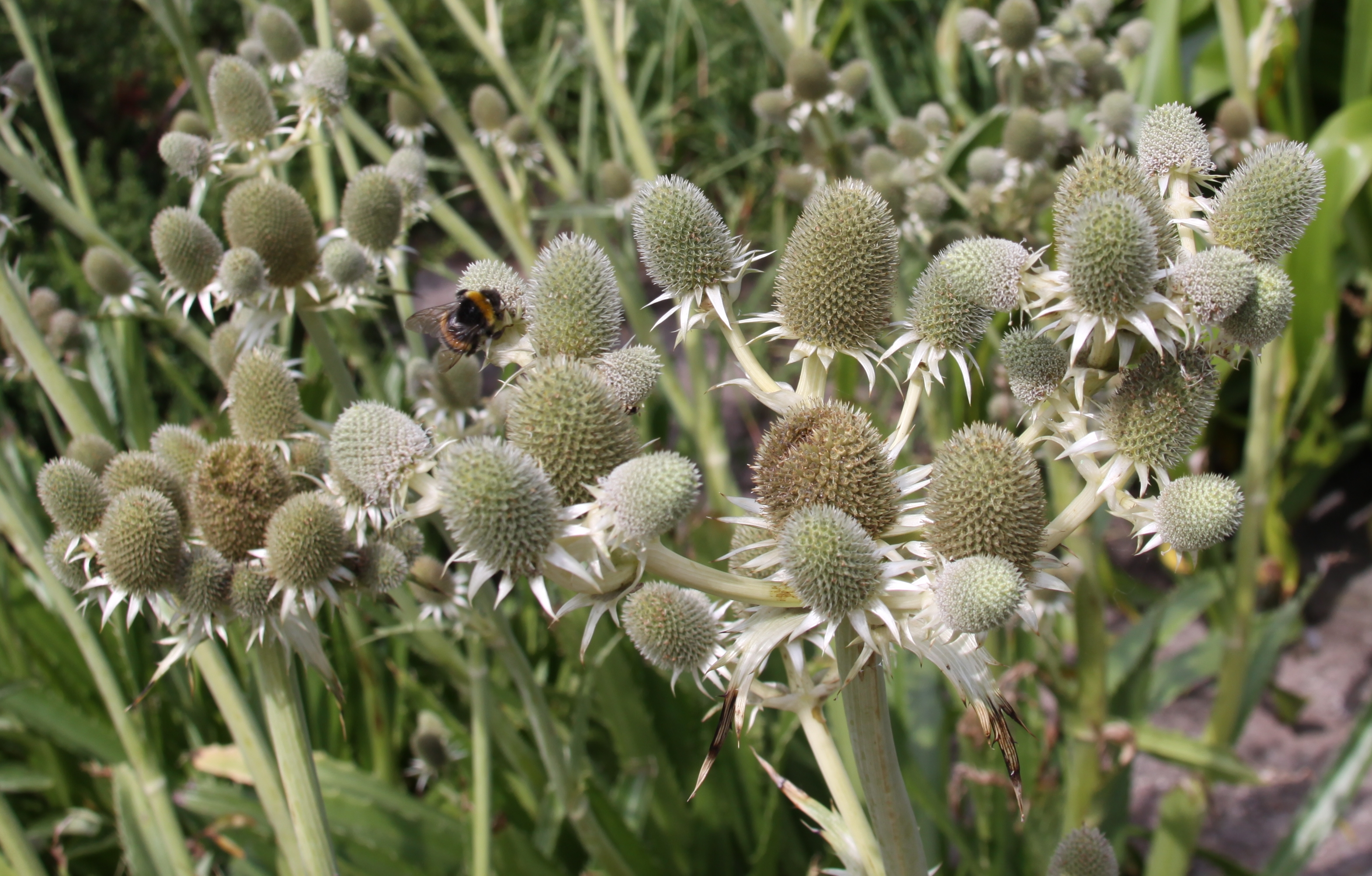
Eryngium agavifolium

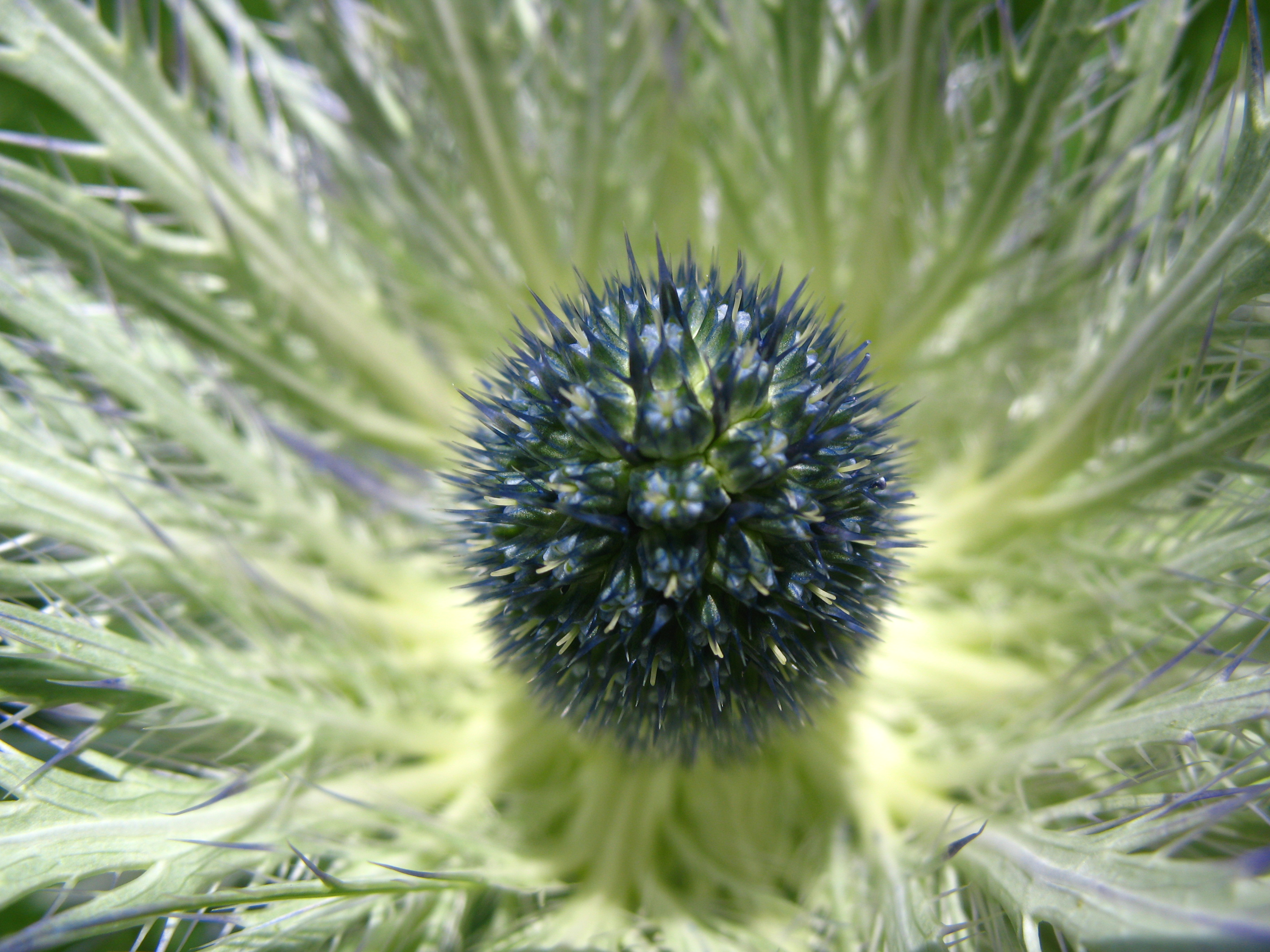
Eryngium alpinum

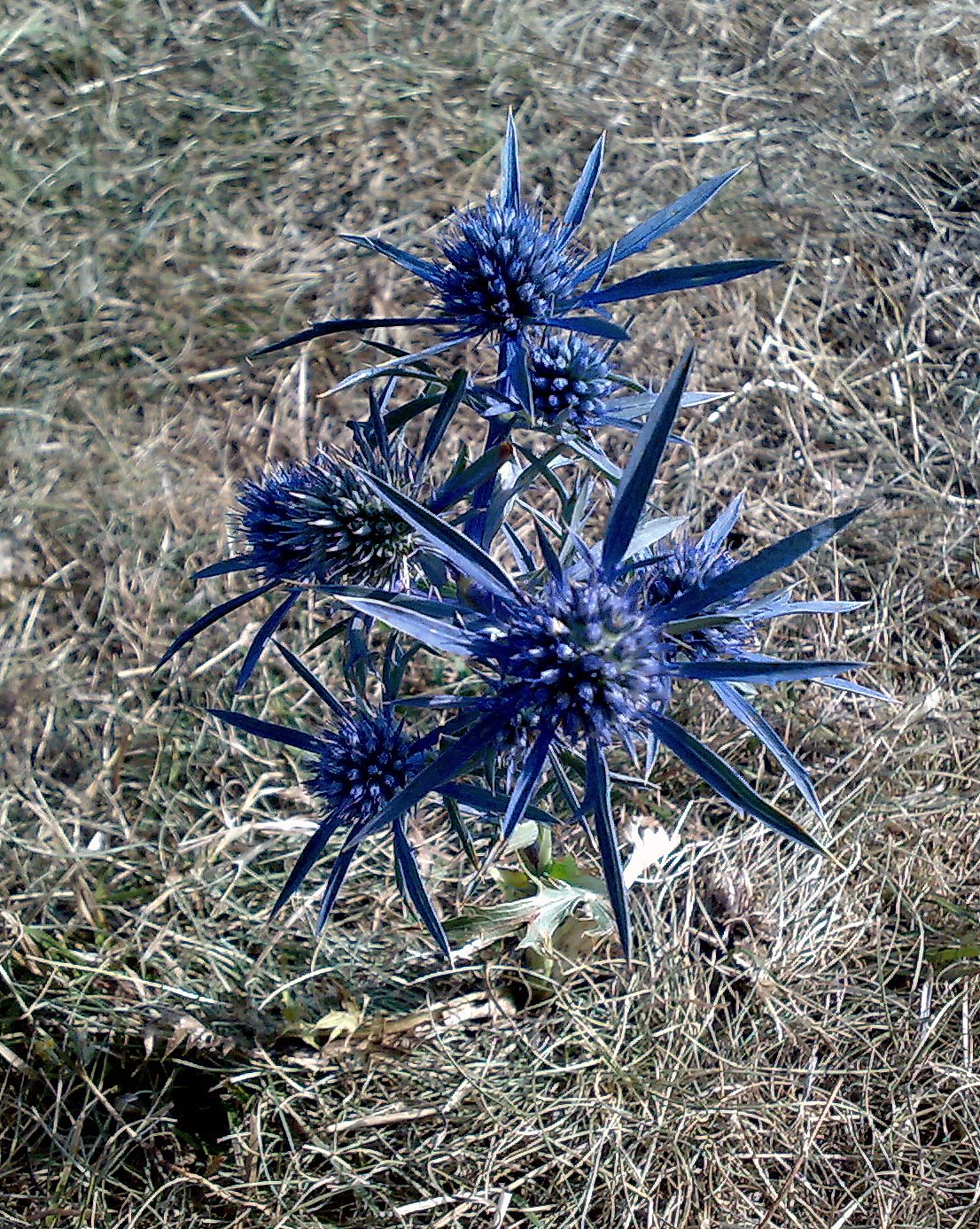
Eryngium amethystinum

Species include:

- Eryngium agavifolium – agave-leaved eryngo
- Eryngium alismifolium – Modoc eryngo
- Eryngium alpinum – alpine eryngo
- Eryngium amethystinum – amethyst eryngo
- Eryngium aquaticum – rattlesnake master
- Eryngium aristulatum – California eryngo
- Eryngium armatum – coastal eryngo
- Eryngium aromaticum – fragrant eryngo
- Eryngium articulatum – beethistle
- Eryngium baldwinii – Baldwin's eryngo
- Eryngium billardieri – Billardier's eryngo
- Eryngium bourgatii Gouan – Bourgati's eryngo
- Eryngium caeruleum – sky-blue eryngo
- Eryngium campestre – field eryngo
- Eryngium carlinae – gravatá
- Eryngium castrense – Great Valley eryngo
- Eryngium constancei – Loch Lomond eryngo
- Eryngium creticum
- Eryngium cuneifolium – wedgeleaf eryngo, snakeroot
- Eryngium cymosum
- Eryngium diffusum – spreading eryngo
- Eryngium divaricatum – ballast eryngo
- Eryngium ebracteatum – burnet-flowered eryngo
- Eryngium eburneum
- Eryngium foetidum – false coriander, stinkweed, culantro, spiritweeed
- Eryngium giganteum – giant sea holly, Miss Willmott's ghost
- Eryngium gracile
- Eryngium guatemalense
- Eryngium heterophyllum – Mexican thistle, Wright's eryngo
- Eryngium hookeri – Hooker's eryngo
- Eryngium horridum
- Eryngium humboldtii – Humboldt's eryngo
- Eryngium humile
- Eryngium integrifolium – blueflower eryngo
- Eryngium jaliscense
- Eryngium leavenworthii – Leavenworth's eryngo
- Eryngium lemmonii – Chiricahua Mountain eryngo
- Eryngium longifolium
- Eryngium maritimum – sea holly, seaside eryngo
- Eryngium mathiasiae – Mathias's eryngo
- Eryngium nasturtiifolium – hierba del sapo
- Eryngium ombrophilum
- Eryngium ovinum – blue devil
- Eryngium paludosum – long eryngo
- Eryngium pandanifolium – pandan-leaved eryngo
- Eryngium paniculatum
- Eryngium pendletonense – Pendleton button-celery, Pendleton's eryngo
- Eryngium petiolatum – rushleaf eryngo, Oregon coyote thistle
- Eryngium phyteumae – Huachuca Mountain eryngo
- Eryngium pinnatifidum – blue devils
- Eryngium pinnatisectum – Tuolumne eryngo
- Eryngium planum – blue eryngo, plains eryngo
- Eryngium prostratum – creeping eryngo
- Eryngium proteiflorum – protea-flowered eryngo
- Eryngium racemosum – delta eryngo
- Eryngium rostratum – blue devil
- Eryngium serbicum – Serbian eryngo
- Eryngium serra
- Eryngium sparganophyllum – Arizona eryngo
- Eryngium spinalba
- Eryngium spinosepalum – spinysepal eryngo
- Eryngium tricuspidatum
- Eryngium variifolium – Moroccan eryngo
- Eryngium vaseyi – coyote thistle
- Eryngium venustum
- Eryngium vesiculosum – prickfoot
- Eryngium yuccifolium – rattlesnake master, button snakeroot, button eryngo

== Uses ==
=== Horticulture ===
Eryngos are grown as ornamental plants in gardens. The most widely grown species are E. agavifolium, E. alpinum, E. bourgatii, E. giganteum, E. pandanifolium, E. planum, E. variifolium and E. yuccifolium. Two hybrids have also been selected for garden use, one being E. × olivierianum (syn. E. x zabelii), of which there are several cultivars such as 'Big Blue', and the other is E. × tripartitum. The species with the most cultivars is E. planum. Overall, around 250 cultivars have been named in the genus. Some species and cultivars have gained the Royal Horticultural Society's Award of Garden Merit.

=== Medicine and food ===
Many species of Eryngium have been used as medicine and food. Eryngium campestre is used as a folk medicine in Turkey. In Iran, Eryngium (Boghnagh فارسی- بوقناق) is used as herbal tea to lower blood sugar. Eryngium creticum is a herbal remedy for scorpion stings in Jordan. Eryngium elegans is used in Argentina and Eryngium foetidum in Latin America and South-East Asia. Native American peoples used many species for varied purposes. Cultures worldwide have used Eryngium extracts as anti-inflammatory agents. Eryngium yields an essential oil and contains many kinds of terpenoids, saponins, flavonoids, coumarins, and steroids.

The roots, particularly those of Eryngium maritimum, have been used as vegetables or sweetmeats. Young shoots and leaves are sometimes used as vegetables like asparagus. Eryngium foetidum is used as a culinary herb in tropical parts of the Americas and Asia. It tastes similar to coriander or cilantro, and is sometimes mistaken for it. It may be called spiny coriander or culantro, or by its Vietnamese name of ngo gai.

== Bibliography ==
- MBG (2022). "Eryngium × zabelii 'Big Blue'". Planf finder.
