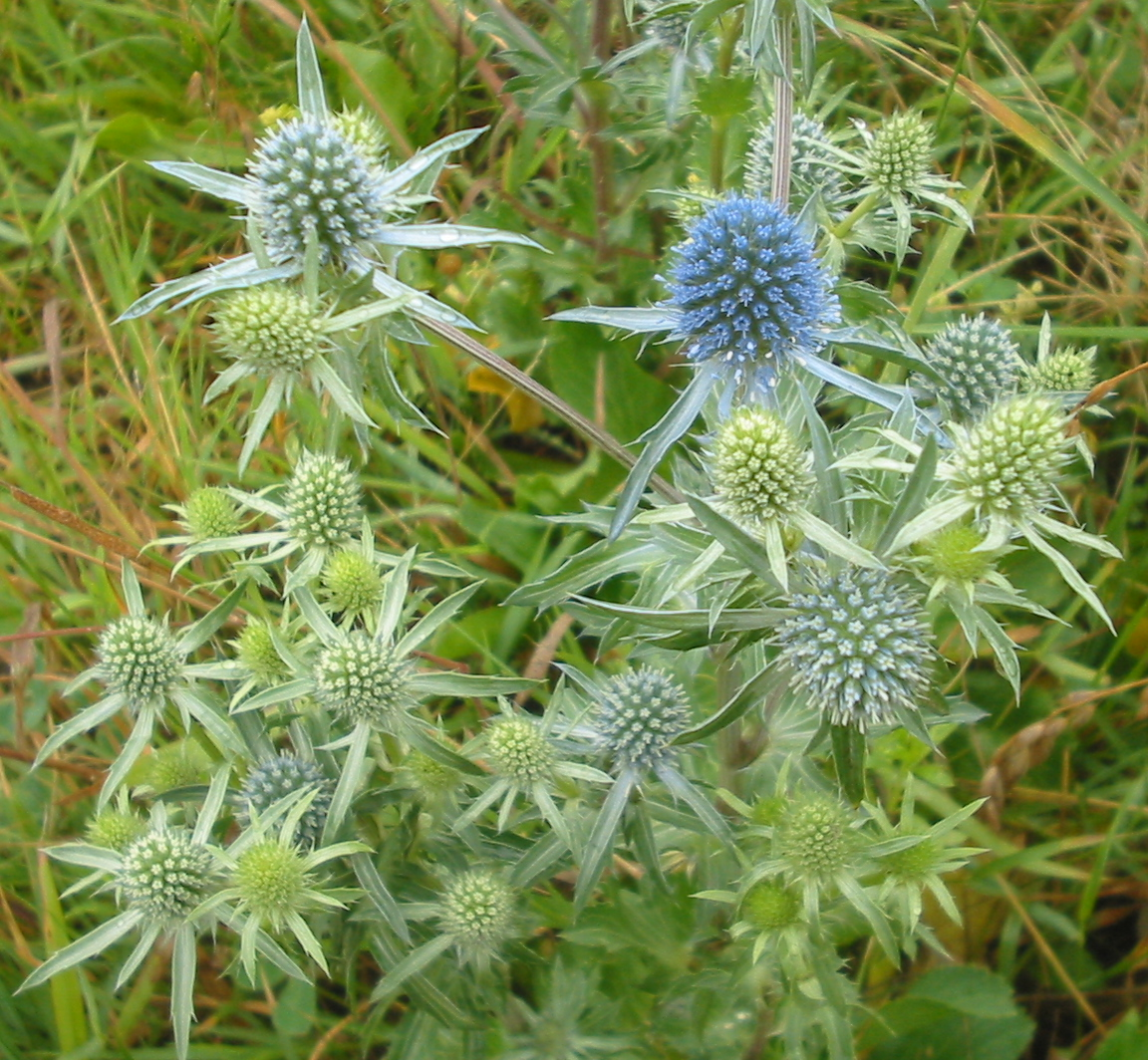

Scientific classification
- Kingdom: Plantae
- Clade: Tracheophytes
- Clade: Angiosperms
- Clade: Eudicots
- Clade: Asterids
- Order: Apiales
- Family: Apiaceae
- Genus: Eryngium
- Species: E. planum

Binomial name
- Eryngium planum L.

= Eryngium planum =

Species of flowering plant in the celery family

Eryngium planum, the blue eryngo or flat sea holly, is a species of flowering plant in the family Apiaceae, native to the area that includes central and southeastern Europe and Central Asia. It is a thistle-like herbaceous perennial growing to 50 cm (20 in) with branched silvery-blue stems, and numerous small blue conical flowerheads surrounded by spiky bracts in summer.

== Herbal ==
Eryngium planum is used in European folk medicine as a diuretic, a stimulant, and an appetizer owing to its essential oils, and bioactive compounds, and in this usage it may be known as Eryngii plani herba or Eryngii plani radix.

== Analysis ==
The groups of bioactive compounds present in E. planum are phenolic acids, triterpenoid saponins, flavonoids, coumarins, and essential oils. The wide range of compounds is reflected in the wide range of uses.

Qualitative and quantitative determinations of the phenolic acids by reverse phase high-performance liquid chromatography (RP HPLC) show relatively small amounts of rosmarinic, chlorogenic, and caffeic acids in the basal leaves and the roots of intact plants, and greater concentrations in E. planum from in vitro cultures. Qualitative and quantitative analyses of the essential oil compounds performed by gas chromatography with a flame ionization detector linked to a mass spectrometer (GC-FID-MS) show the main components of stalk leaf oil, and rosette leaf oil, as monoterpenes (limonene, and α- and β-pinene), sesquiterpenes, and hydrocarbons. (Z)-Falcarinol was found as the major component of root essential oil.

== Gallery ==
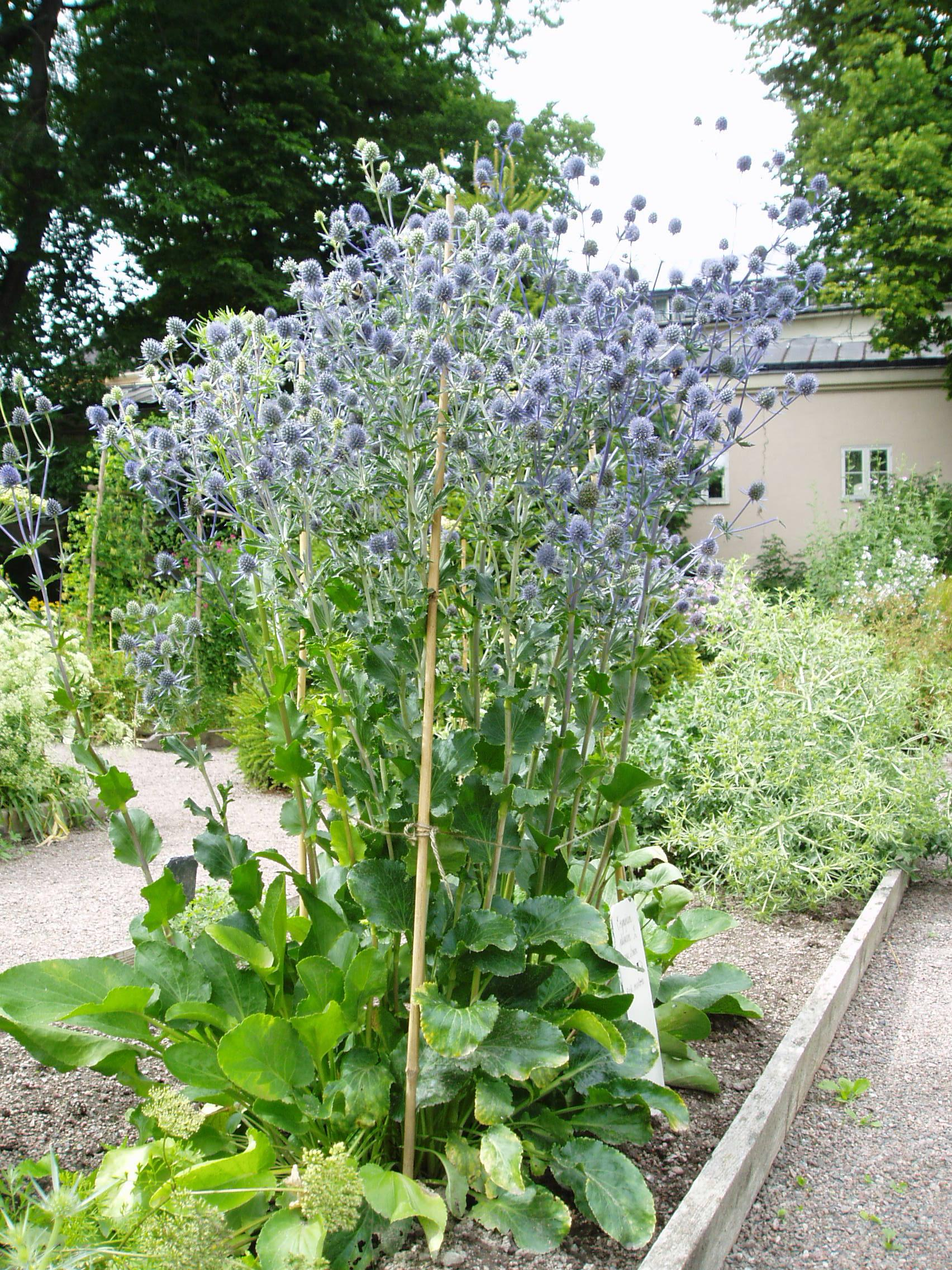
Cultivated specimen, showing basal leaf rosette, cauline leaves and profusion of spiny, blue umbels
