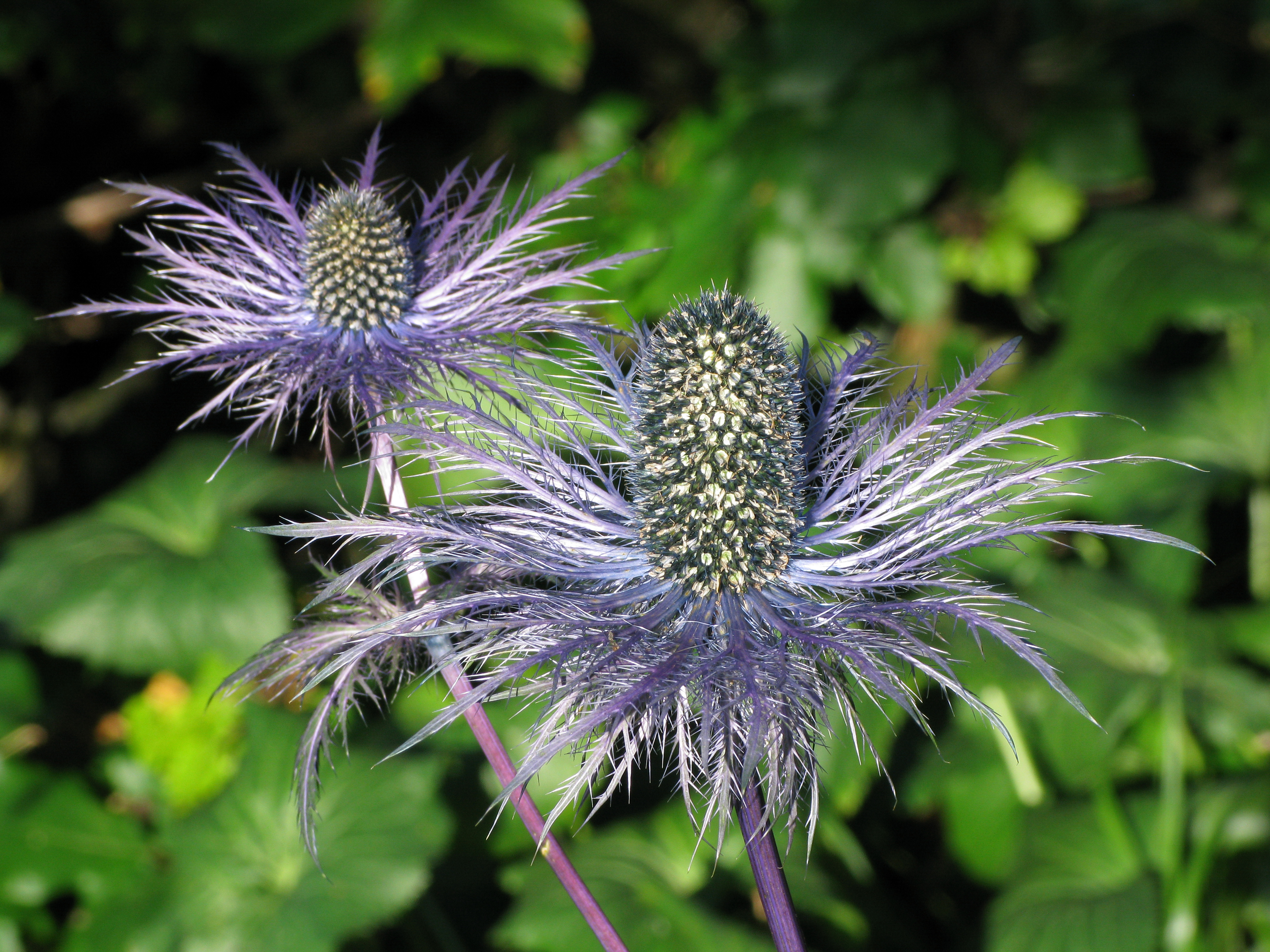

Conservation status
- Near Threatened (IUCN 3.1)

Scientific classification
- Kingdom: Plantae
- Clade: Embryophytes
- Clade: Tracheophytes
- Clade: Spermatophytes
- Clade: Angiosperms
- Clade: Eudicots
- Clade: Asterids
- Order: Apiales
- Family: Apiaceae
- Genus: Eryngium
- Species: E. alpinum

Binomial name
- Eryngium alpinum L.

= Eryngium alpinum =

Species of flowering plant in the celery family

Eryngium alpinum, the alpine sea holly, alpine eryngo or queen of the Alps, is a herbaceous perennial plant in the family Apiaceae.

== Description ==
Eryngium alpinum is a hemicryptophyte, its overwintering buds are situated just below the soil surface and the floral axis more or less erect with a few leaves. The roots are deep and robust.

The stems are solitary and erect, usually with three branches on the apex and with longitudinal purple stripes. This plant generally reaches about 30–70 centimetres (12–28 in) in height, with a maximum of 100 centimetres (39 in). The basal leaves are oval or heart-shaped, 10–15 centimetres (3.9–5.9 in) wide and 13–17 centimetres (5.1–6.7 in) long, with toothed hedges and a long petiole. The cauline leaves are sessile and progressively more divided.

The inflorescences are dense umbels at the top of the main branches. They are bright green at the bases and the stiff, bristly bracts are blue. They are about 4 cm long and 2 cm diameter and the bracts are up to 25 centimetres (9.8 in) long. The flowers inside are about 2 mm long. The peripheral flowers are sterile and the internal flowers are hermaphroditic. Both types are actinomorphic and pentamerous, with five petals. Flowering occurs in July through September. The flowers are -insect-pollinated. The fruit is a spiny achene about half a centimeter wide.

== Distribution and habitat ==
This plant is native to Austria, Liechtenstein, Croatia, France, Switzerland, Italy, and Slovenia. It grows in subalpine scrub, rocky areas and wet pastures, preferably in limestone, at an altitude of 1,500–2,000 metres (4,900–6,600 ft) above sea level.

== Cultivation ==
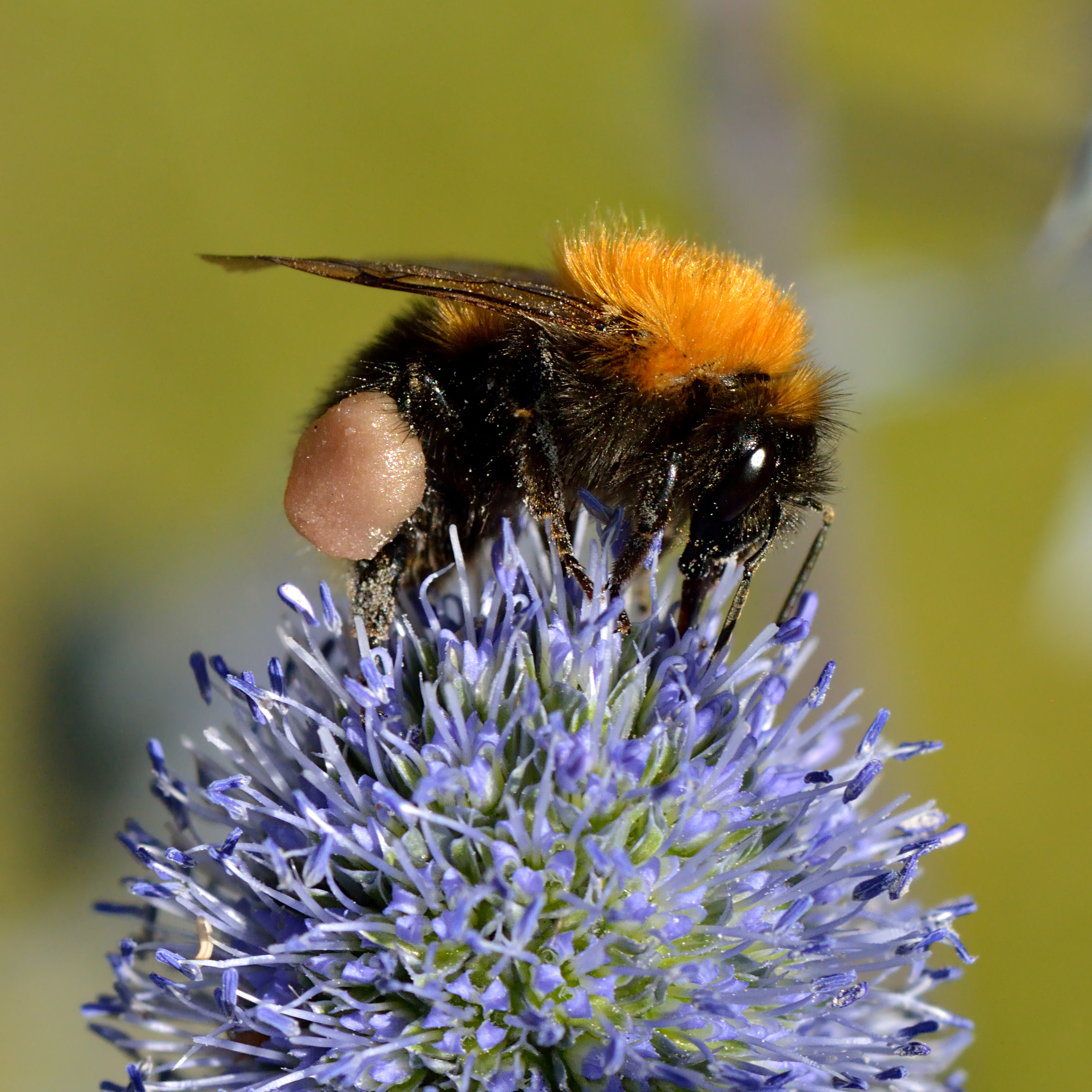
Flowers of Eryngium alpinum attract honeybees and bumblebees; here with tree bumblebee

Eryngium alpinum is cultivated as an ornamental plant for its blue and purple flowerheads. It requires dry, well-drained soil and full sun.

== Conservation ==
Wild populations of the species are in decline due to overcollection for ornamental use and habitat degradation from recreational activity and grazing. Numerous local extinctions of subpopulations have occurred.

== Gallery ==
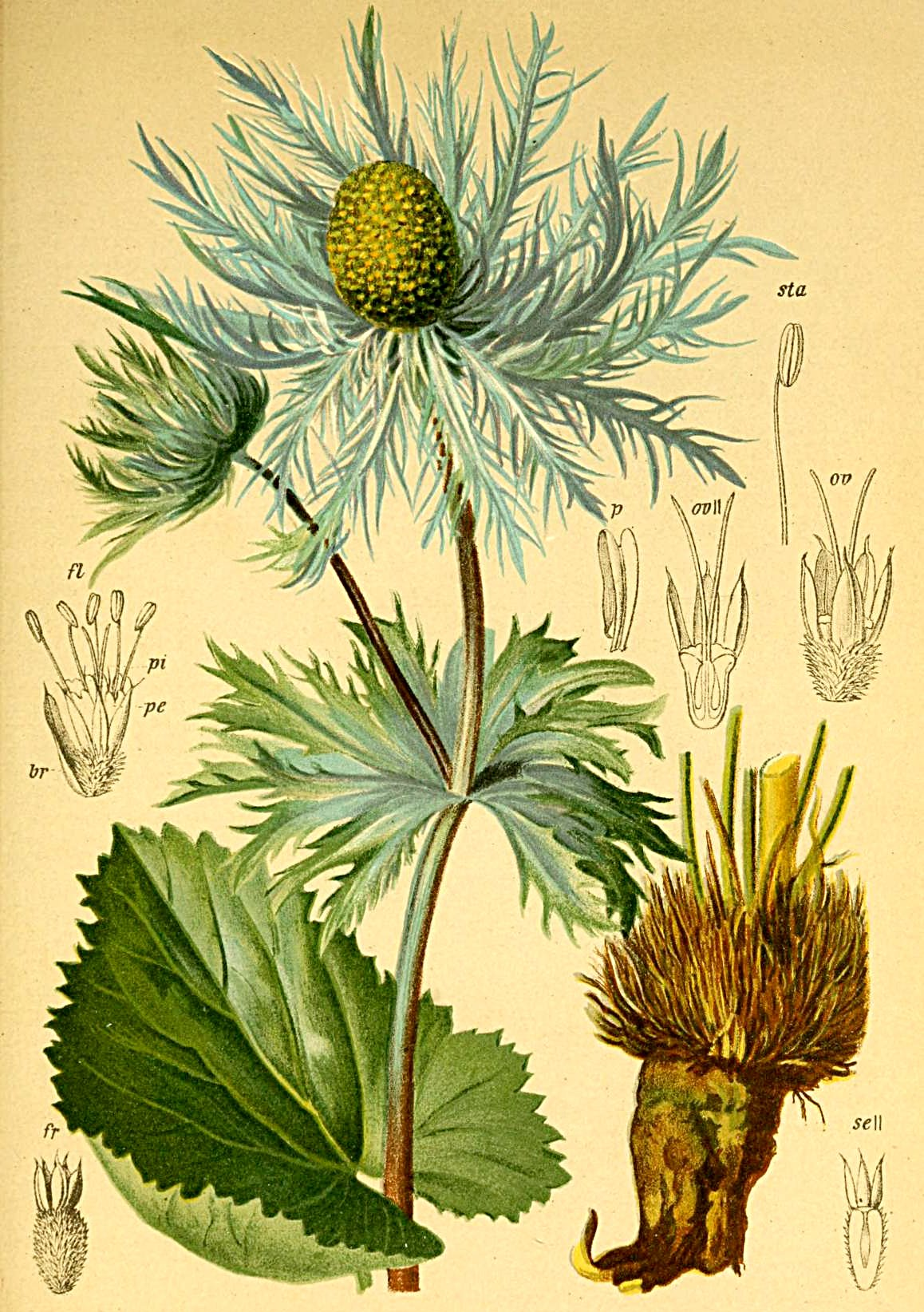
Eryngium alpinum from Atlas der Alenflora, 1882

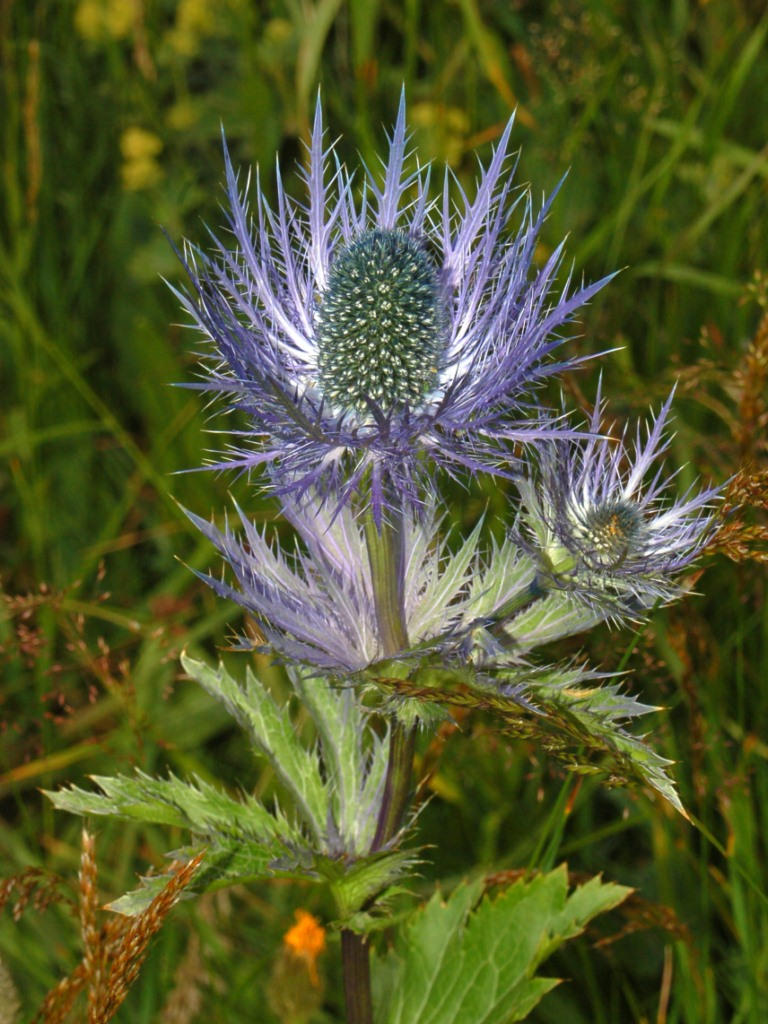
Form

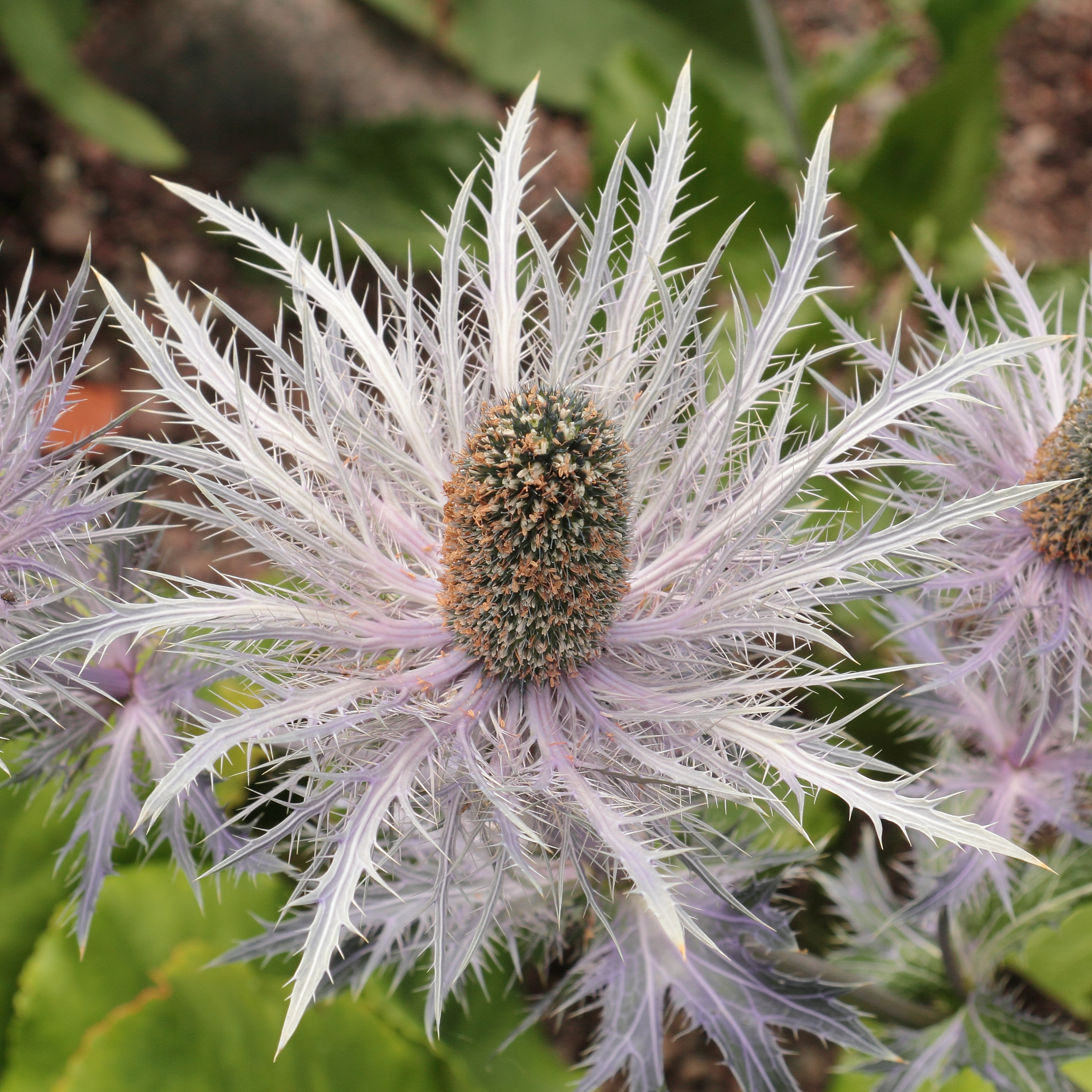
Cultivar

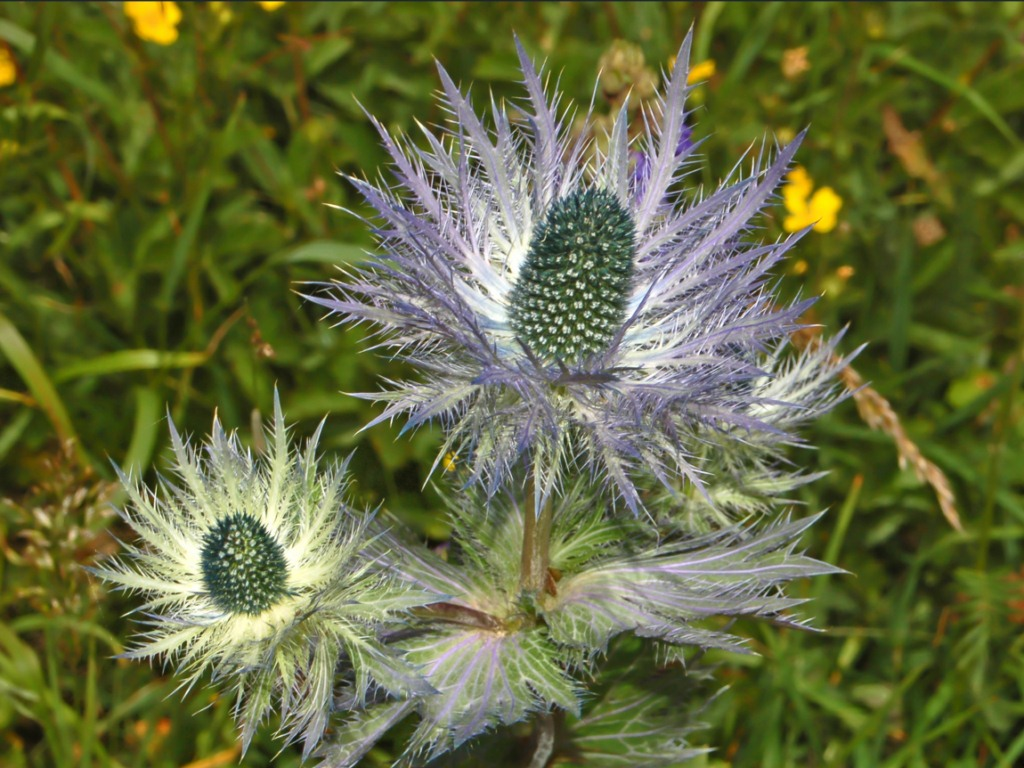
Inflorescences
