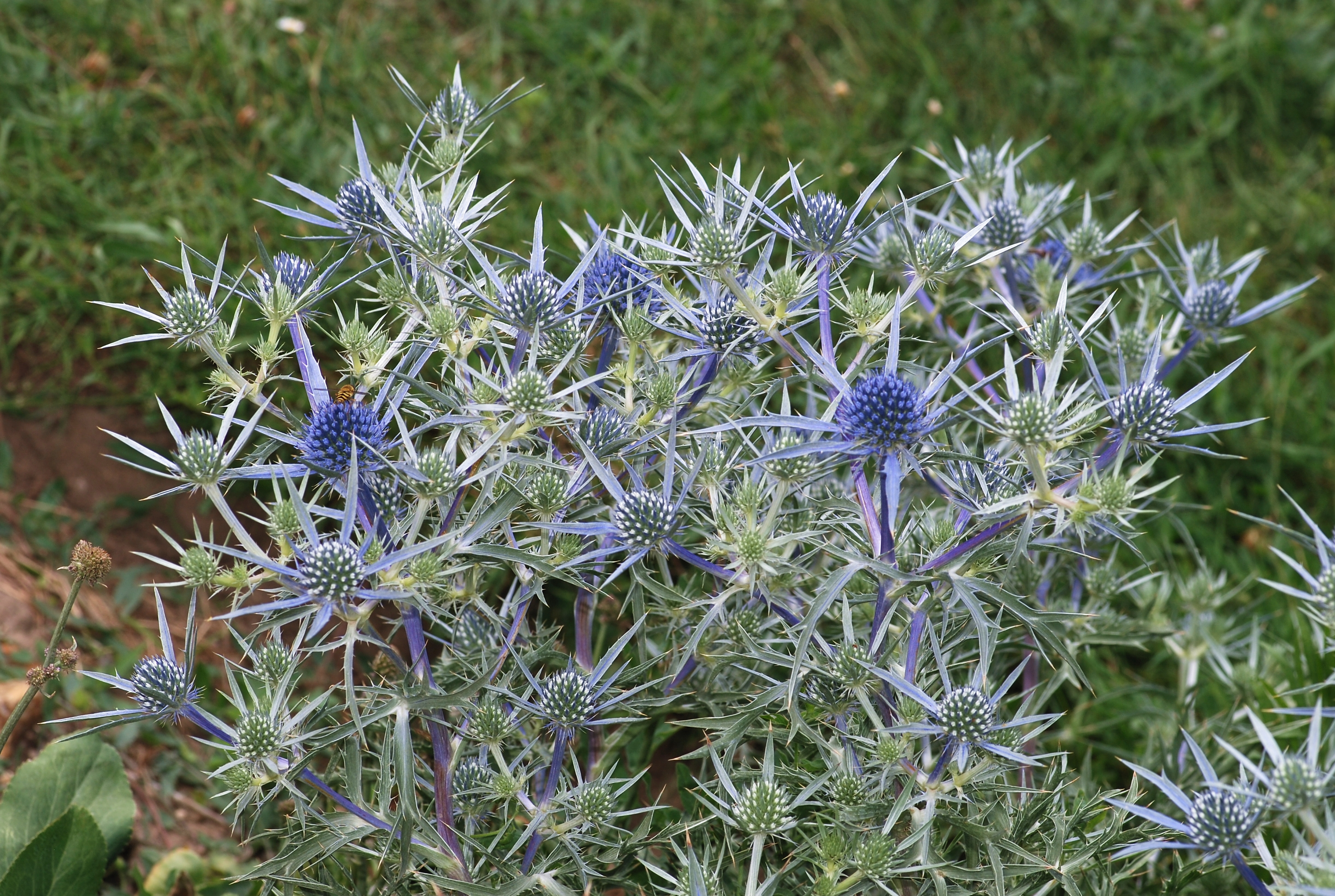

Scientific classification
- Kingdom: Plantae
- Clade: Tracheophytes
- Clade: Angiosperms
- Clade: Eudicots
- Clade: Asterids
- Order: Apiales
- Family: Apiaceae
- Genus: Eryngium
- Species: E. amethystinum

Binomial name
- Eryngium amethystinum L.

= Eryngium amethystinum =

Species of flowering plant in the celery family

Eryngium amethystinum, the amethyst eryngo, Italian eryngo or amethyst sea holly, is a clump-forming, perennial, tap-rooted herb. Its stem is 30 to 50 cm (12 to 20 in) long and is light blue to purple in colour. It has a basal circle of obovate, pinnate, spiny, leathery, mid-green leaves. It flowers in mid to late summer with cylindrical umbels, 2–3 cm long atop silvery blue bracts and branching stems. The plant is native to the eastern Mediterranean and prefers dry places and soils that are rich in calcium.
