= List of Eryngium species =

Eryngium is a genus of plants in the family Apiaceae. As of October 2026, Plants of the World Online accepted about 250 species.

== A ==
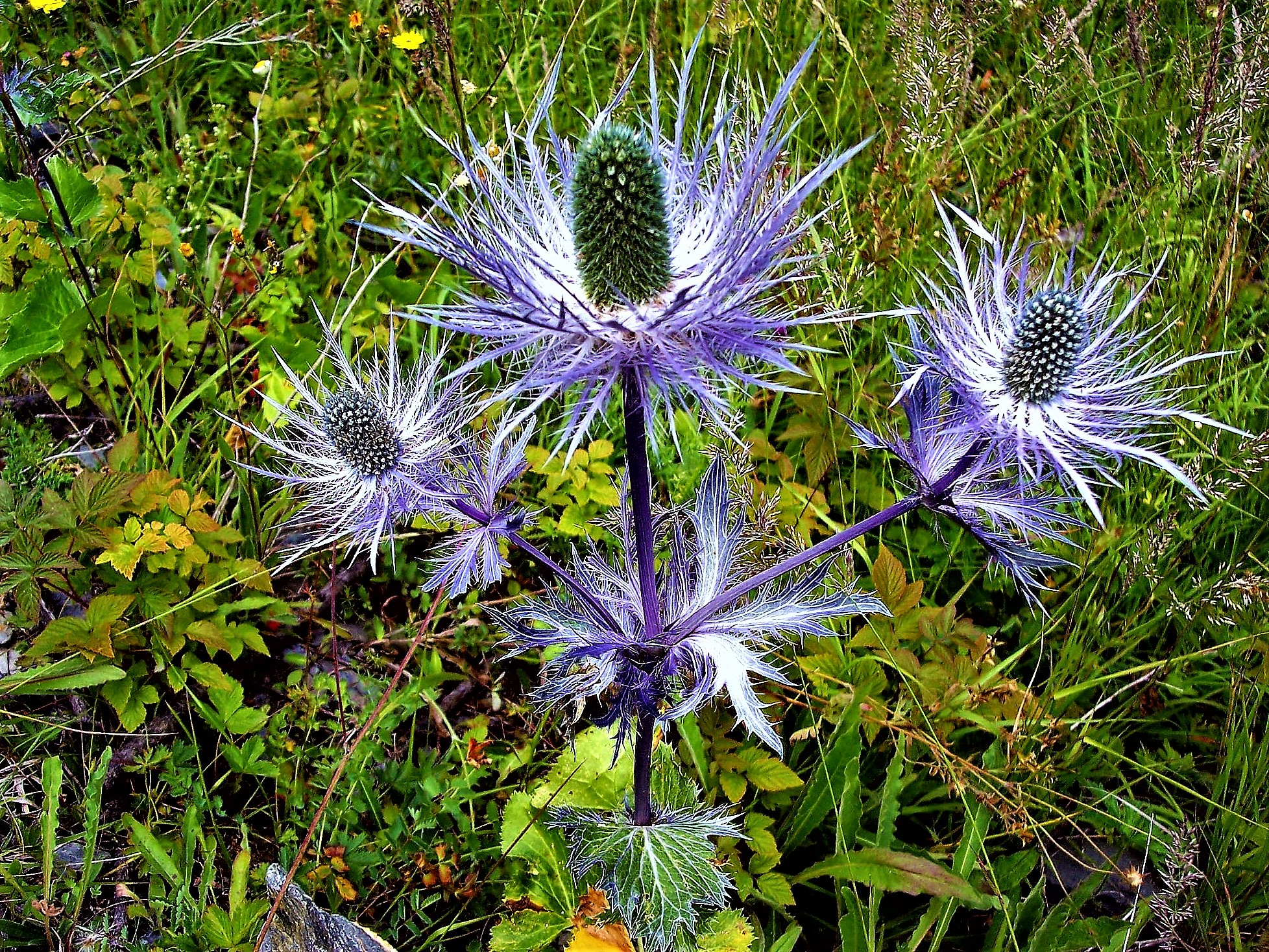
Eryngium alpinum

- Eryngium absconditum Esquivel Mattos & C.I.Calviño
- Eryngium agavifolium Griseb.
- Eryngium alismifolium Greene
- Eryngium aloifolium Mart. ex Urb.
- Eryngium alpinum L.
- Eryngium altamaha Kees, Weakley & D.B.Poind.
- Eryngium alternatum J.M.Coult. & Rose
- Eryngium amethystinum L.
- Eryngium amorginum Rech.f.
- Eryngium andicola H.Wolff
- Eryngium anomalum Hook. & Arn.
- Eryngium antiatlanticum Jury
- Eryngium aquaticum L.
- Eryngium aquifolium Cav.
- Eryngium arenosum C.I.Calviño & G.A.Levin
- Eryngium argyreum Maire
- Eryngium aristulatum Jeps.
- Eryngium armatum (S.Watson) J.M.Coult. & Rose
- Eryngium aromaticum Baldwin
- Eryngium articulatum Hook.
- Eryngium atacamense A.Padin & C.I.Calviño
- Eryngium atlanticum Batt. & Pit.

== B ==
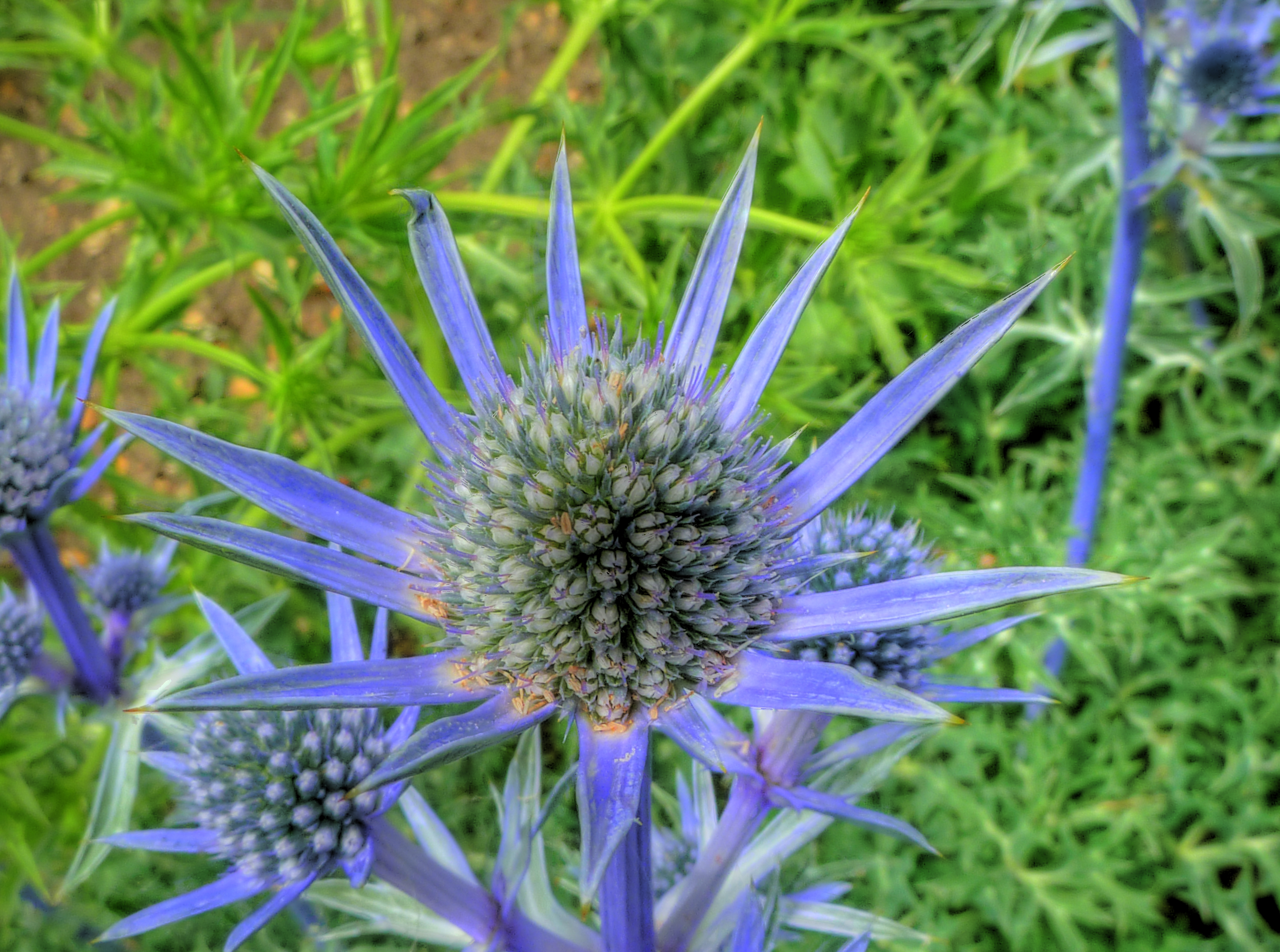
Eryngium bourgatii

- Eryngium babadaghense G.E.Genç, Akalın & Wörz
- Eryngium balansae H.Wolff
- Eryngium baldwinii Spreng.
- Eryngium beckii M.Mend.
- Eryngium beecheyanum Hook. & Arn.
- Eryngium bicentenarium M.Mend. & I.G.Vargas
- Eryngium billardierei F.Delaroche
- Eryngium bithynicum Boiss.
- Eryngium bolivianum M.Mend.
- Eryngium bonplandii F.Delaroche
- Eryngium bornmuelleri Nábělek
- Eryngium bourgatii Gouan
- Eryngium brasiliense Constance
- Eryngium buchtienii H.Wolff
- Eryngium bungei Boiss.
- Eryngium bupleuroides Hook. & Arn.

== C ==
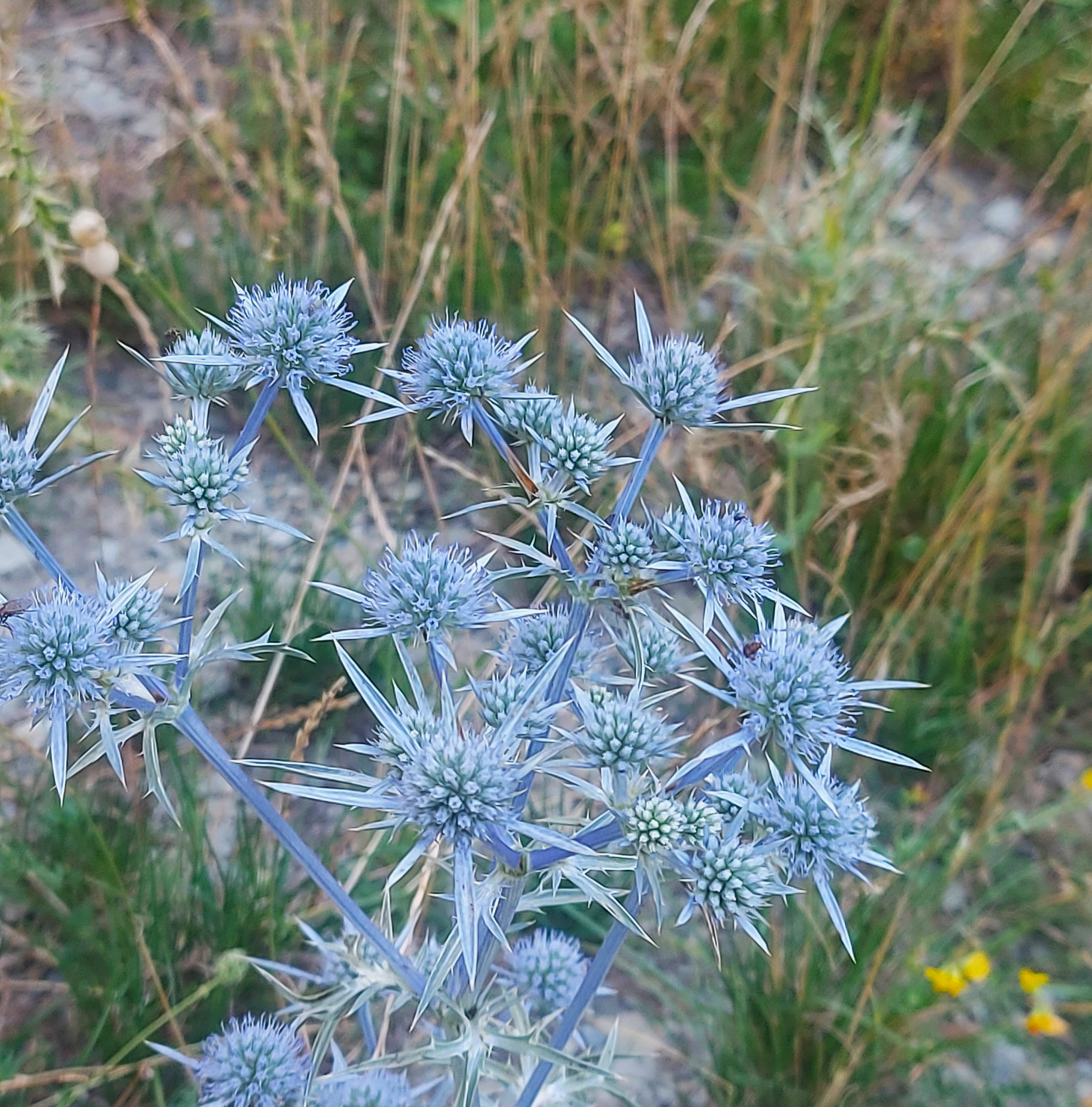
Eryngium creticum

- Eryngium caeruleum M.Bieb.
- Eryngium caespitiferum Font Quer & Pau
- Eryngium calaster Standl.
- Eryngium campestre L.
- Eryngium canaliculatum Cham. & Schltdl.
- Eryngium cardosii Clos
- Eryngium carlinae F.Delaroche
- Eryngium carlinoides Boiss.
- Eryngium castrense Jeps.
- Eryngium cerradense P.Esquivel Mattos & C.I.Calviño
- Eryngium cervantesii F.Delaroche
- Eryngium chamissonis Urb.
- Eryngium × chevalieri Sennen
- Eryngium chubutense Neger ex Dusén
- Eryngium ciliatum Cham. & Schltdl.
- Eryngium columnare Hemsl.
- Eryngium comosum F.Delaroche
- Eryngium constancei M.Y.Sheikh
- Eryngium coquimbanum Phil. ex Urb.
- Eryngium corallinum Mathias & Constance
- Eryngium corniculatum Lam.
- Eryngium coronatum Hook. & Arn.
- Eryngium crassifolium A.Padin & C.I.Calviño
- Eryngium crassisquamosum Hemsl.
- Eryngium creticum Lam.
- Eryngium cuneifolium Small
- Eryngium cylindricum Larrañaga
- Eryngium cymosum F.Delaroche

== D ==
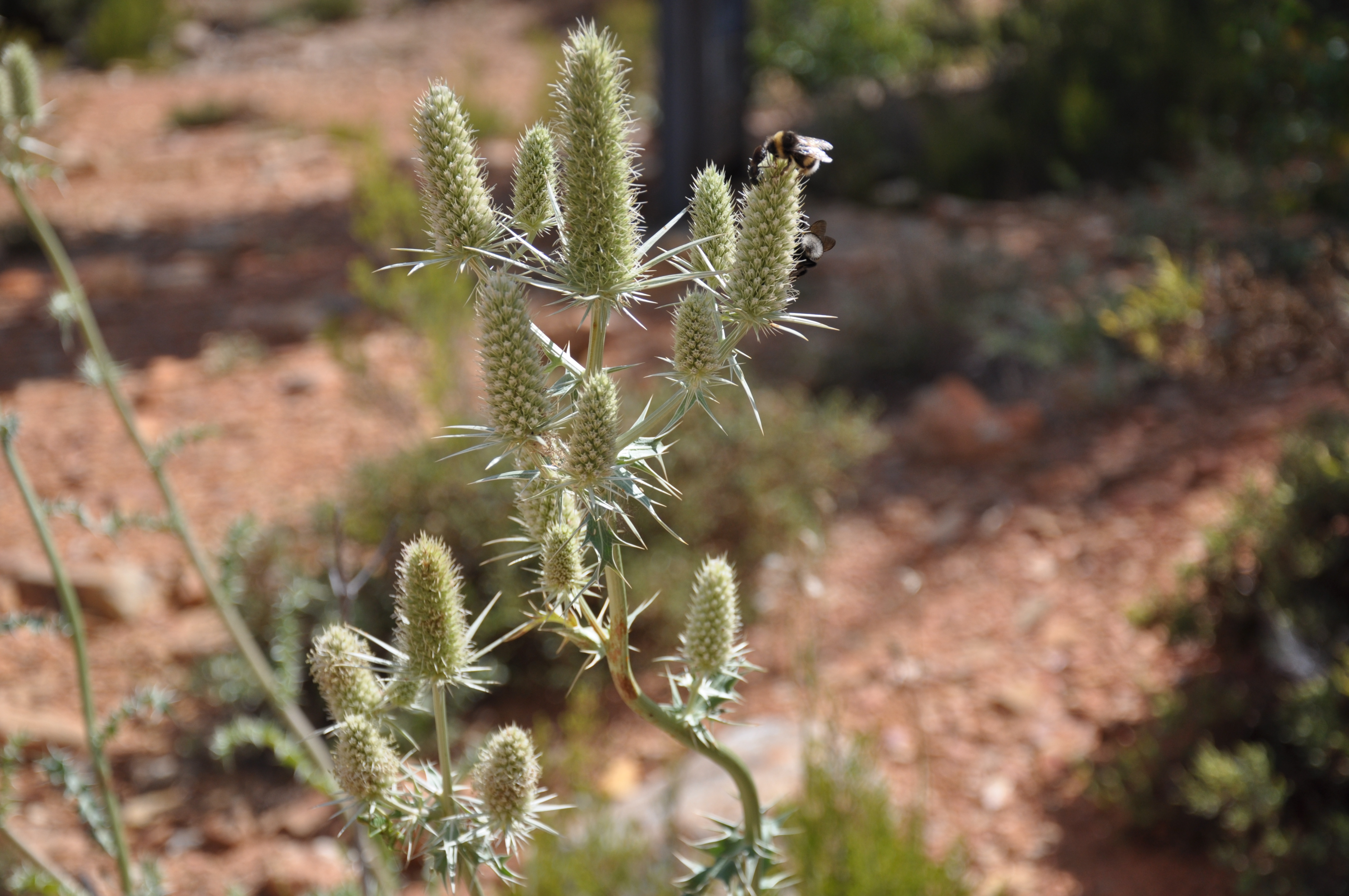
Eryngium duriaei

- Eryngium davisii Kit Tan & Yıldız
- Eryngium deppeanum Schltdl. & Cham.
- Eryngium depressum Hook. & Arn.
- Eryngium desertorum Zohary
- Eryngium dichotomum Desf.
- Eryngium diffusum Torr.
- Eryngium dilatatum Lam.
- Eryngium divaricatum Hook. & Arn.
- Eryngium dorae C.Norman
- Eryngium duriaei J.Gay ex Boiss.
- Eryngium dusenii H.Wolff

== E ==
- Eryngium ebracteatum Lam.
- Eryngium eburneum Decne. ex Hérincq
- Eryngium echinatum Urb.
- Eryngium ekmanii H.Wolff
- Eryngium elegans Cham. & Schltdl.
- Eryngium eriophorum Cham. & Schltdl.
- Eryngium erzincanicum Yıld.
- Eryngium eurycephalum Malme
- Eryngium expansum F.Muell.

== F ==
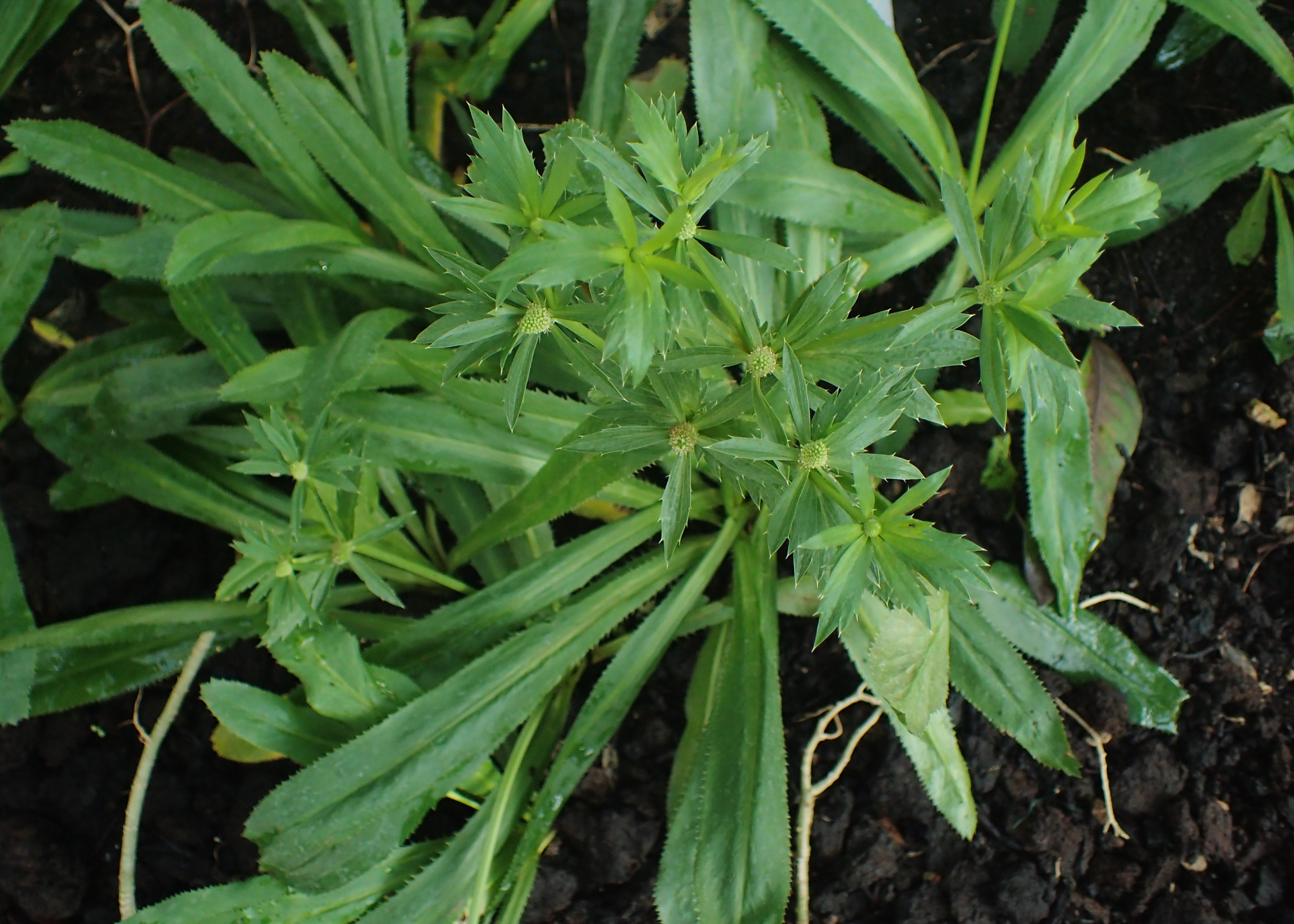
Eryngium foetidum

- Eryngium falcatum F.Delaroche
- Eryngium falcifolium Irgang
- Eryngium × fernandezianum Skottsb.
- Eryngium ferrisiae Constance
- Eryngium floribundum Cham. & Schltdl.
- Eryngium fluitans M.E.Jones
- Eryngium fluminense Urb.
- Eryngium foetidum L.
- Eryngium foliosum Scheele
- Eryngium fontanum A.E.Holland & E.J.Thomps.

== G ==
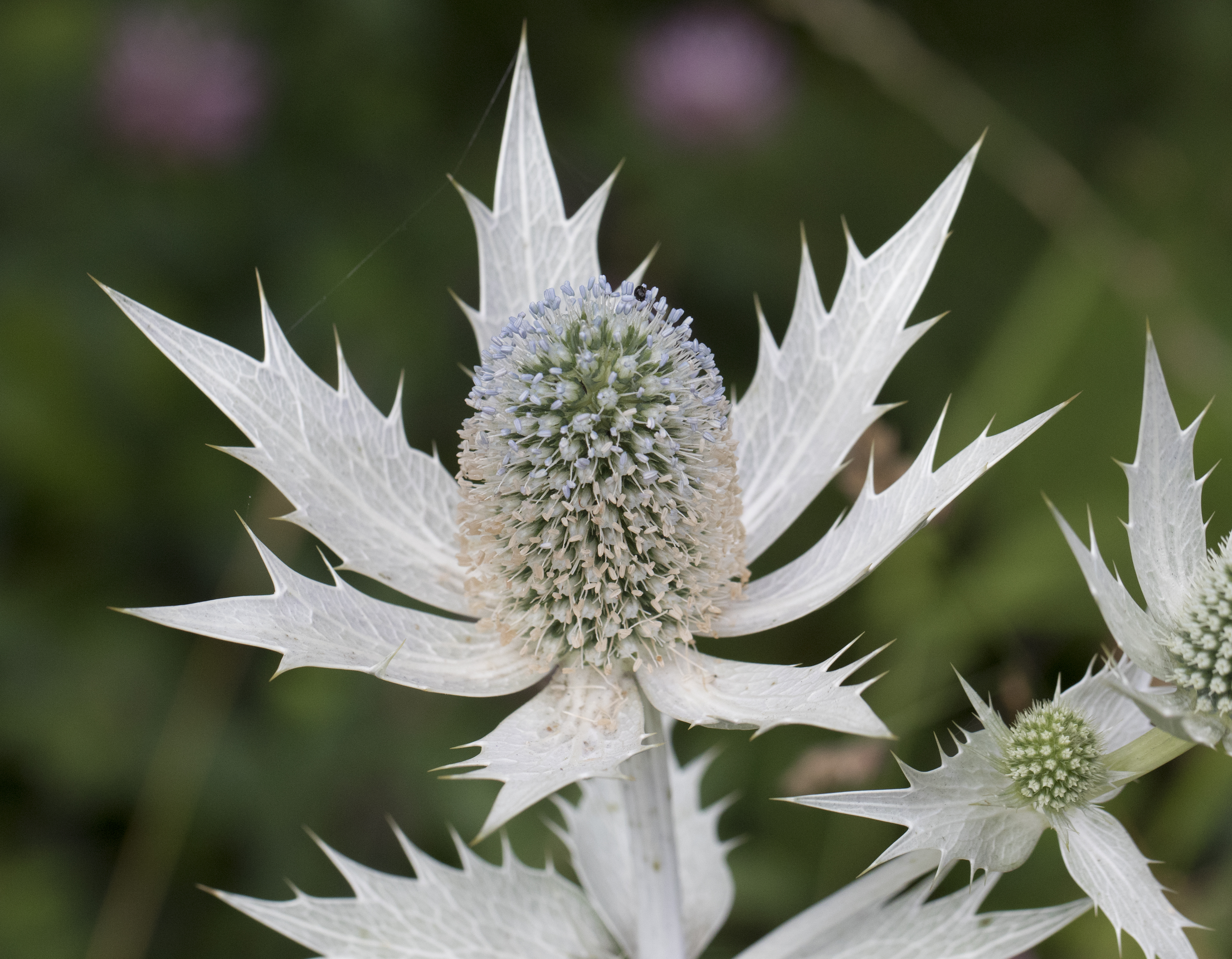
Eryngium giganteum

- Eryngium galeottii Hemsl.
- Eryngium galioides Lam.
- Eryngium gentryi Constance & Bye
- Eryngium ghiesbreghtii Decne.
- Eryngium giganteum M.Bieb.
- Eryngium glaciale Boiss.
- Eryngium glaziovianum Urb.
- Eryngium globosum Hemsl.
- Eryngium glomeratum Lam.
- Eryngium glossophyllum H.Wolff
- Eryngium goulartii Urb.
- Eryngium goyazense Urb.
- Eryngium gracile F.Delaroche
- Eryngium gramineum F.Delaroche
- Eryngium grossii Font Quer
- Eryngium guatemalense Hemsl.

== H ==
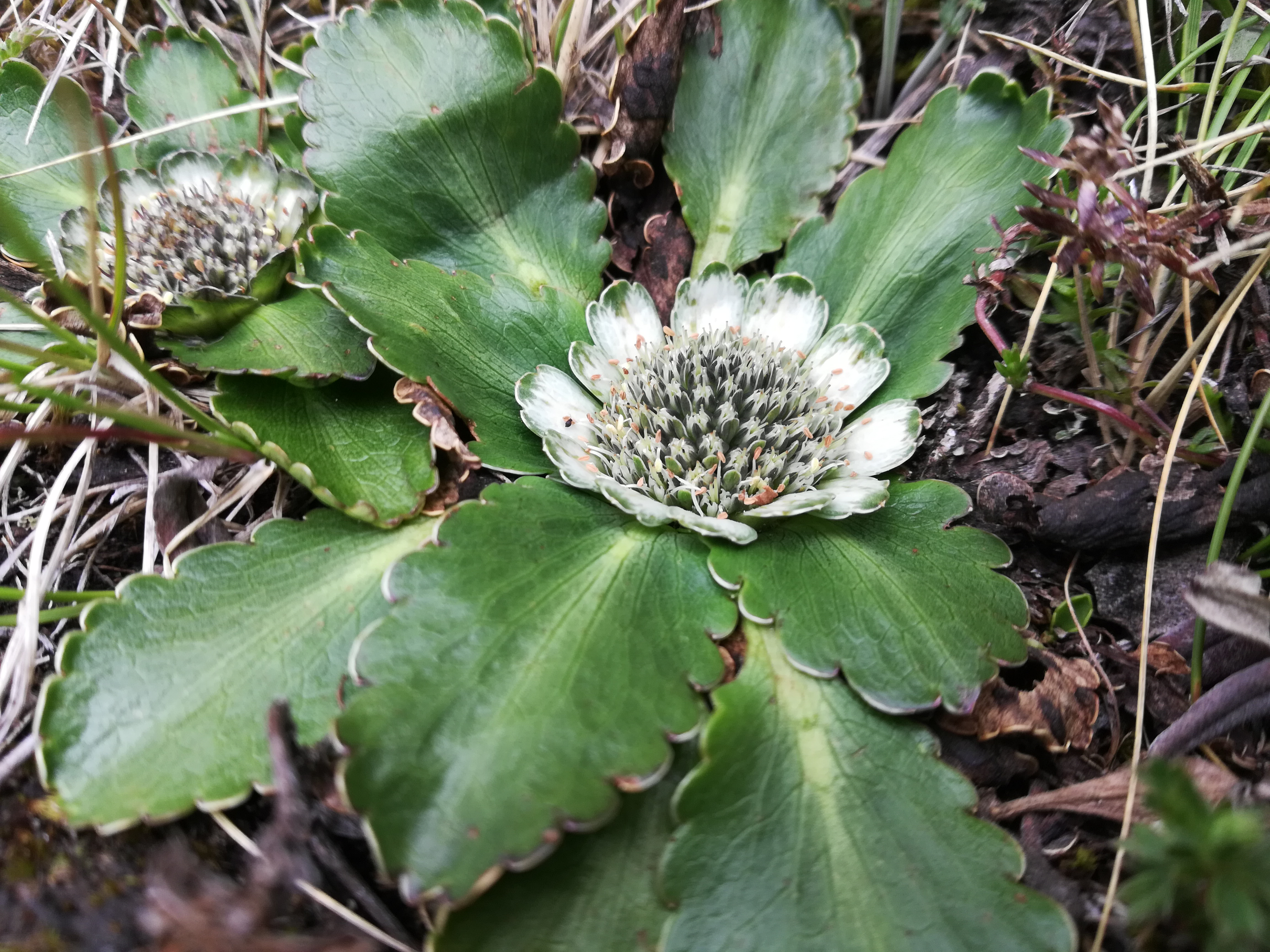
Eryngium humile

- Eryngium haenkei C.Presl ex DC.
- Eryngium hainesii C.C.Towns.
- Eryngium hassleri H.Wolff
- Eryngium heldreichii Boiss.
- Eryngium hemisphaericum Urb.
- Eryngium hemsleyanum H.Wolff
- Eryngium × heteracanthum Teyber
- Eryngium heterophyllum Engelm.
- Eryngium hookeri Walp.
- Eryngium horridum Malme
- Eryngium humboldtii F.Delaroche
- Eryngium humifusum Clos
- Eryngium humile Cav.
- Eryngium huteri Porta & Rigo

== I ==
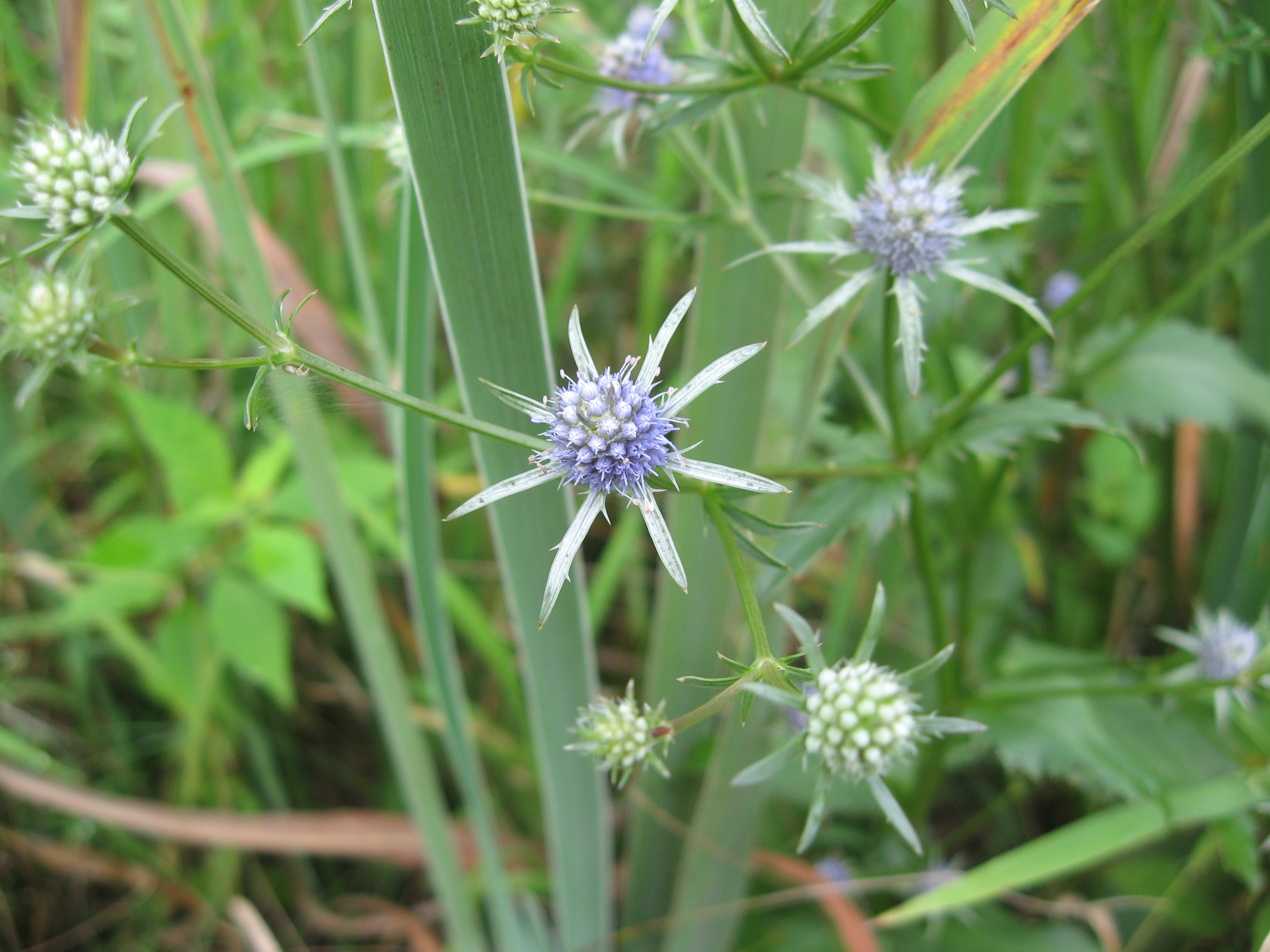
Eryngium integrifolium

- Eryngium ilex P.H.Davis
- Eryngium ilicifolium Desf.
- Eryngium inaccessum Skottsb.
- Eryngium incantatum Lucena, Novara & Cuezzo
- Eryngium integrifolium Walter
- Eryngium iranicum Mozaff.
- Eryngium irgangii D.B.Lucas
- Eryngium irwinii Constance
- Eryngium isauricum Contandr. & Quézel

== J ==
- Eryngium jaliscense Mathias & Constance
- Eryngium jepsonii J.M. Coult. & Rose
- Eryngium junceum Cham. & Schltdl.
- Eryngium juncifolium (Urb.) Mathias & Constance

== K ==
- Eryngium × kalotaszegense J.Papp & Ujvárosi
- Eryngium karatavicum Iljin
- Eryngium koehneanum Urb.
- Eryngium kotschyi Boiss.

== L ==
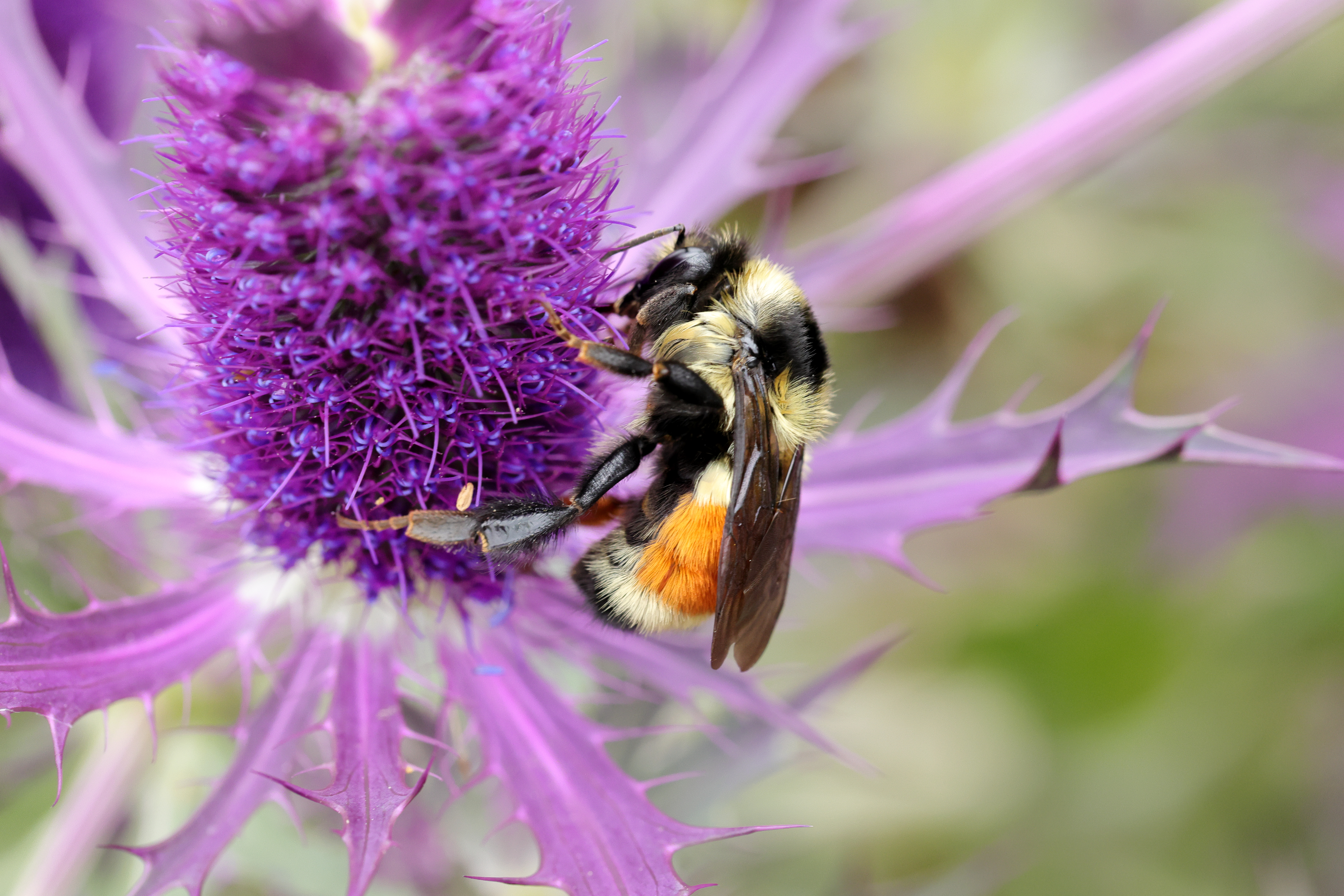
Eryngium leavenworthii

- Eryngium lacustre Pohl ex Urb.
- Eryngium lanceolatum (H.Wolff) Kees, Weakley & D.B.Poind.
- Eryngium leavenworthii Torr. & A.Gray
- Eryngium lemmonii J.M.Coult. & Rose
- Eryngium leptophyllum H.Wolff
- Eryngium longifolium Cav.
- Eryngium lorentzii H.Wolff
- Eryngium ludovicianum Morong
- Eryngium luzulifolium Cham. & Schltdl.

== M ==
- Eryngium macracanthum Phil.
- Eryngium macrocalyx Schrenk ex Fisch. & C.A.Mey.
- Eryngium madrense S.Watson
- Eryngium malmeanum H.Wolff
- Eryngium marginatum Pohl ex Urb.
- Eryngium maritimum L.
- Eryngium marocanum Pit.
- Eryngium mathiasiae M.Y.Sheikh
- Eryngium megapotamicum Malme
- Eryngium mesopotamicum T.M.Pedersen
- Eryngium mexiae Constance
- Eryngium × microcephalum Sieber
- Eryngium mississippiense Kees, Weakley & D.B.Poind.
- Eryngium × mohamedanii Font Quer & Pau
- Eryngium molleri Gand.
- Eryngium moluccanum Steenis
- Eryngium monocephalum Cav.
- Eryngium montanum J.M.Coult. & Rose
- Eryngium montereyense D.W.Taylor & R.E.Preston
- Eryngium multicapitatum Morong

== N ==
- Eryngium nasturtiifolium Juss. ex F.Delaroche
- Eryngium neei M.Mend.
- Eryngium noeanum Boiss.
- Eryngium nudicaule Lam.

== O ==
- Eryngium octophyllum Korovin
- Eryngium ombrophilum Dusén & H.Wolff
- Eryngium ovinum A.Cunn.

== P ==
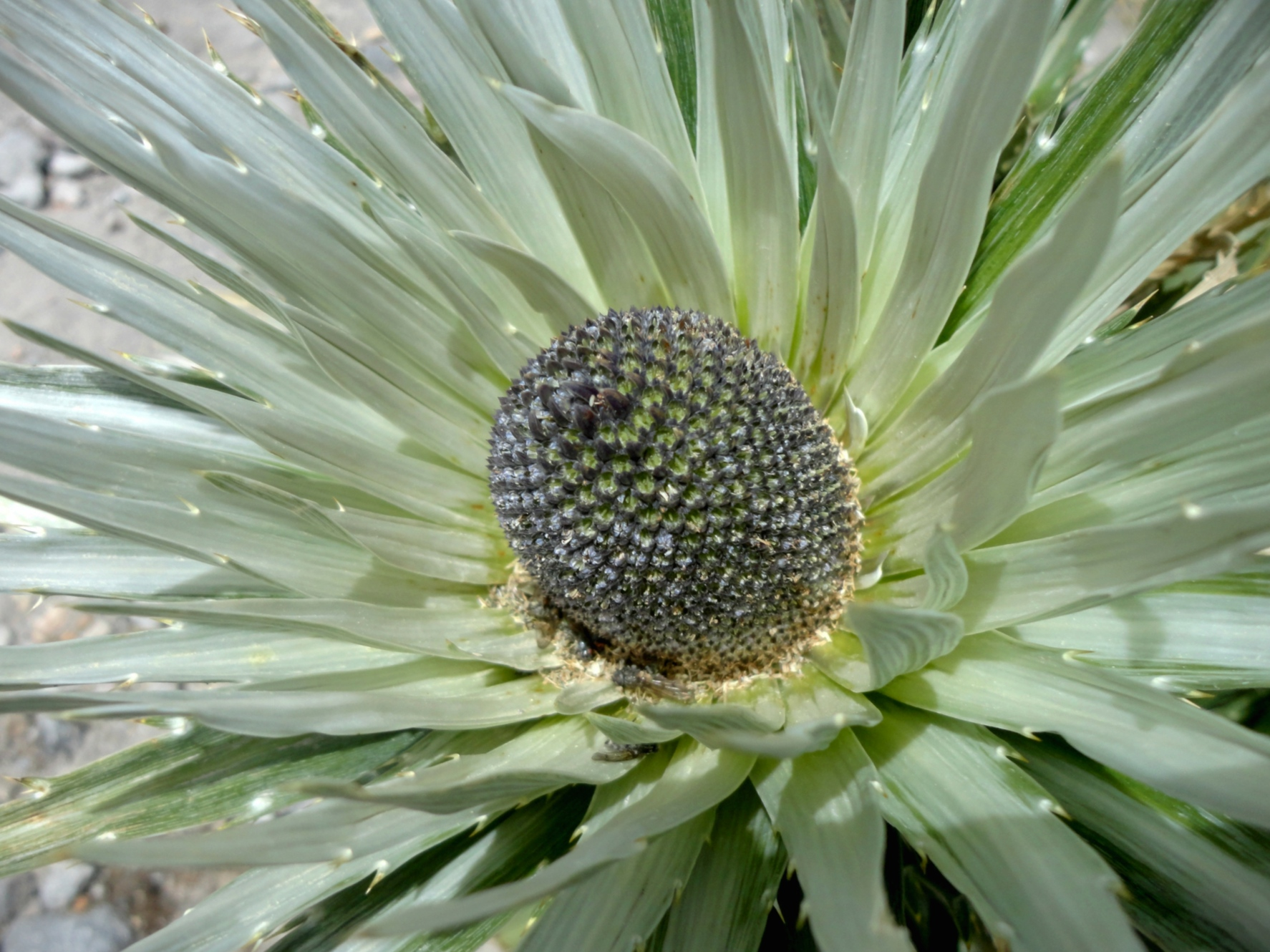
Eryngium proteiflorum

- Eryngium palmatum Pančić & Vis.
- Eryngium palmeri Hemsl.
- Eryngium palmito Boiss. & Heldr.
- Eryngium paludosum (C.Moore) P.W.Michael
- Eryngium pandanifolium Cham. & Schltdl.
- Eryngium paniculatum Cav. & Dombey ex F.Delaroche
- Eryngium paraguariense Urb.
- Eryngium pectinatum C.Presl ex DC.
- Eryngium pendletonense K.L.Marsden & M.G.Simpson
- Eryngium petiolatum Hook.
- Eryngium phyteumae F.Delaroche
- Eryngium pilularioides Hemsl. & Rose
- Eryngium pinnatifidum Bunge
- Eryngium pinnatisectum Jeps.
- Eryngium plantagineum F.Muell.
- Eryngium plantaginifolium H.Wolff
- Eryngium planum L.
- Eryngium pohlianum Urb.
- Eryngium polycephalum Hausskn. ex H.Wolff
- Eryngium pringlei Hemsl. & Rose
- Eryngium pristis Cham. & Schltdl.
- Eryngium proliferum Brade
- Eryngium prostratum Nutt. ex DC.
- Eryngium proteiflorum F.Delaroche
- Eryngium pseudojunceum Clos
- Eryngium pseudothorifolium Contandr. & Quézel
- Eryngium pugae I.García, Mart.-Ram. & Ocampo
- Eryngium pulchellum Phil.
- Eryngium purpusii Hemsl. & Rose
- Eryngium pusillum L.
- Eryngium pyramidale Boiss. & Hausskn.

== R ==
- Eryngium racemosum Jeps.
- Eryngium ramboanum Mathias & Constance
- Eryngium rauhianum Mathias & Constance
- Eryngium raulinii Mathias & Constance
- Eryngium regnellii Malme
- Eryngium riparium Larrañaga
- Eryngium rochei Constance
- Eryngium × rocheri P.Fourn.
- Eryngium rojasii H.Wolff
- Eryngium rosei Hemsl.
- Eryngium rostratum Cav.

== S ==
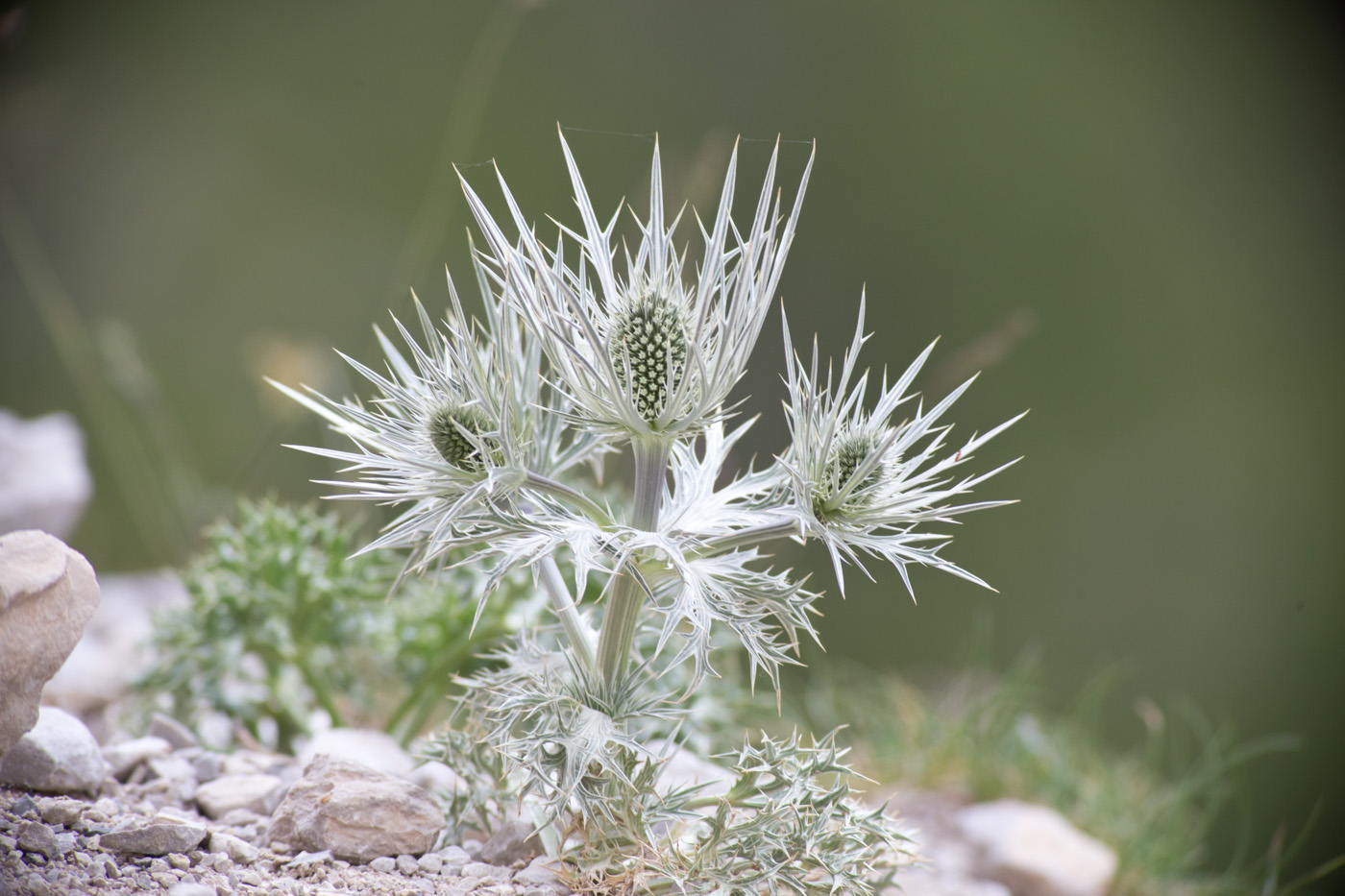
Eryngium spinalba

- Eryngium sanguisorba Cham. & Schltdl.
- Eryngium sarcophyllum Hook. & Arn.
- Eryngium scaposum Turcz.
- Eryngium scirpinum Cham.
- Eryngium sellowii H.Wolff
- Eryngium serbicum Pančić
- Eryngium serra Cham. & Schltdl.
- Eryngium serratum Cav.
- Eryngium smithii Mathias & Constance
- Eryngium sparganioides Clos
- Eryngium sparganophyllum Hemsl.
- Eryngium spinalba Vill.
- Eryngium spinosepalum Mathias
- Eryngium stenophyllum Urb.
- Eryngium strotheri Constance & Affolter
- Eryngium subacaule Cav.
- Eryngium subdecumbens (Benth.) A.Padin
- Eryngium subinerme (H.Wolff) Mathias & Constance
- Eryngium supinum J.M.Black

== T ==
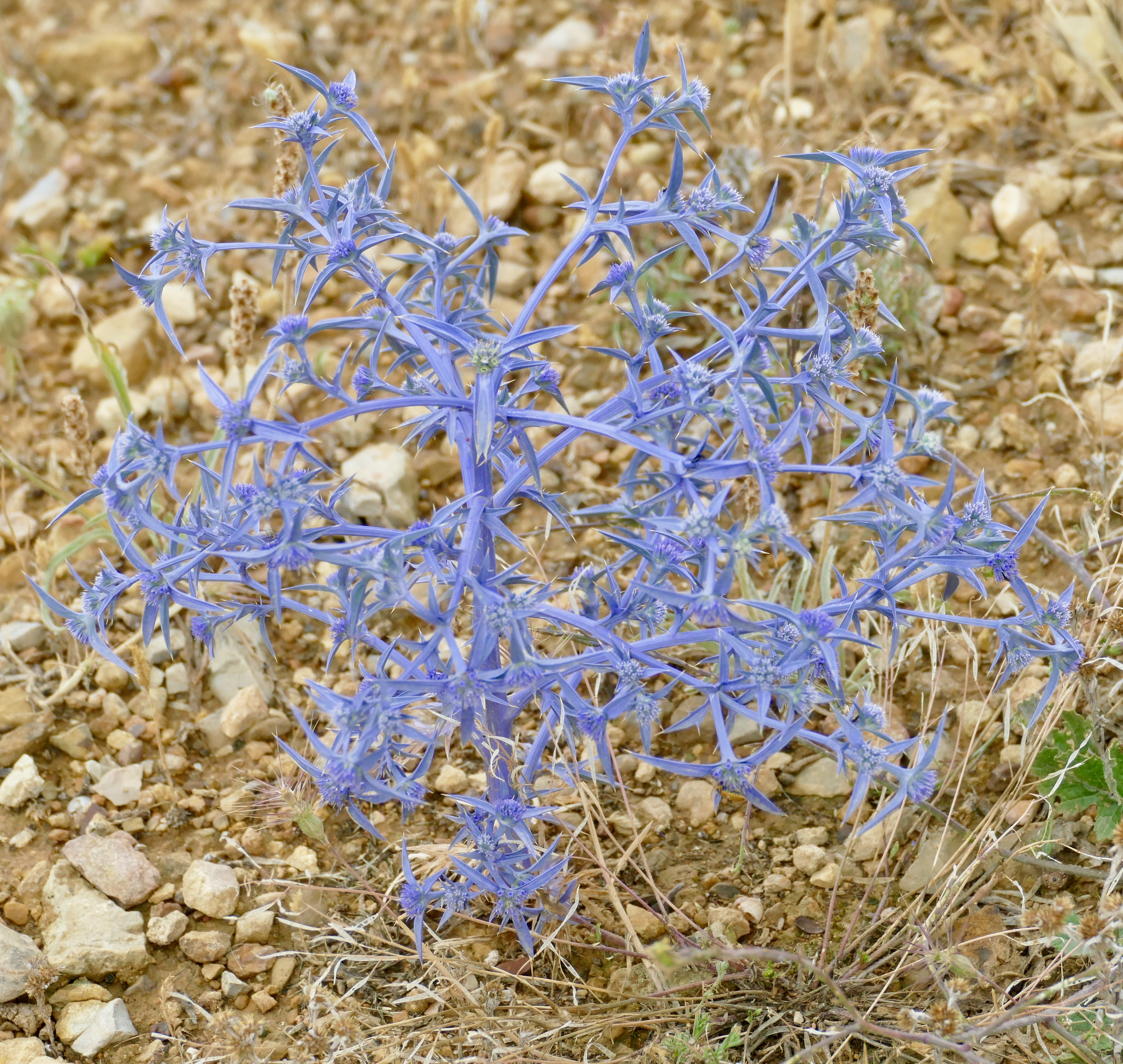
Eryngium triquetrum

- Eryngium tenue Desf.
- Eryngium ternatum Poir.
- Eryngium thorifolium Boiss.
- Eryngium thyrsoideum Boiss.
- Eryngium tricuspidatum L.
- Eryngium triquetrum Vahl
- Eryngium trisectum Wörz & H.Duman
- Eryngium tzeltal Constance

== U ==
- Eryngium undulatum P.W.Michael & Peter G.Wilson
- Eryngium urbanianum H.Wolff

== V ==
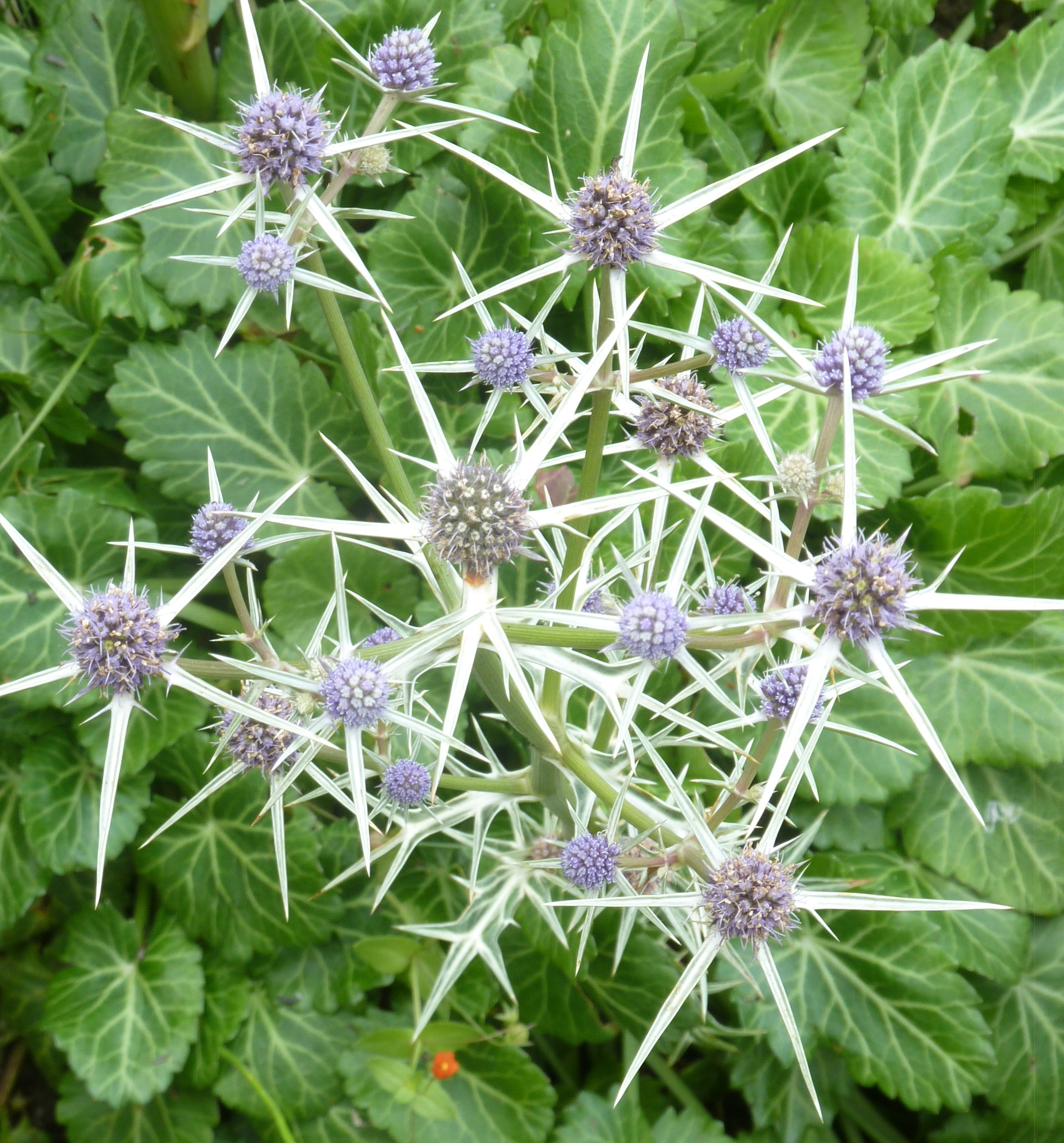
Eryngium variifolium

- Eryngium variifolium Coss.
- Eryngium vaseyi J.M.Coult. & Rose
- Eryngium venustum Bartlett ex Constance
- Eryngium vesiculosum Labill.
- Eryngium × visianii Teyber
- Eryngium viviparum J.Gay

== W ==
- Eryngium wanaturi Woronow
- Eryngium weberbaueri H.Wolff
- Eryngium wiegandii Adamović
- Eryngium woodii M.Mend.

== Y ==
- Eryngium yuccifolium Michx.

== Z ==
- Eryngium zosterifolium H.Wolff
