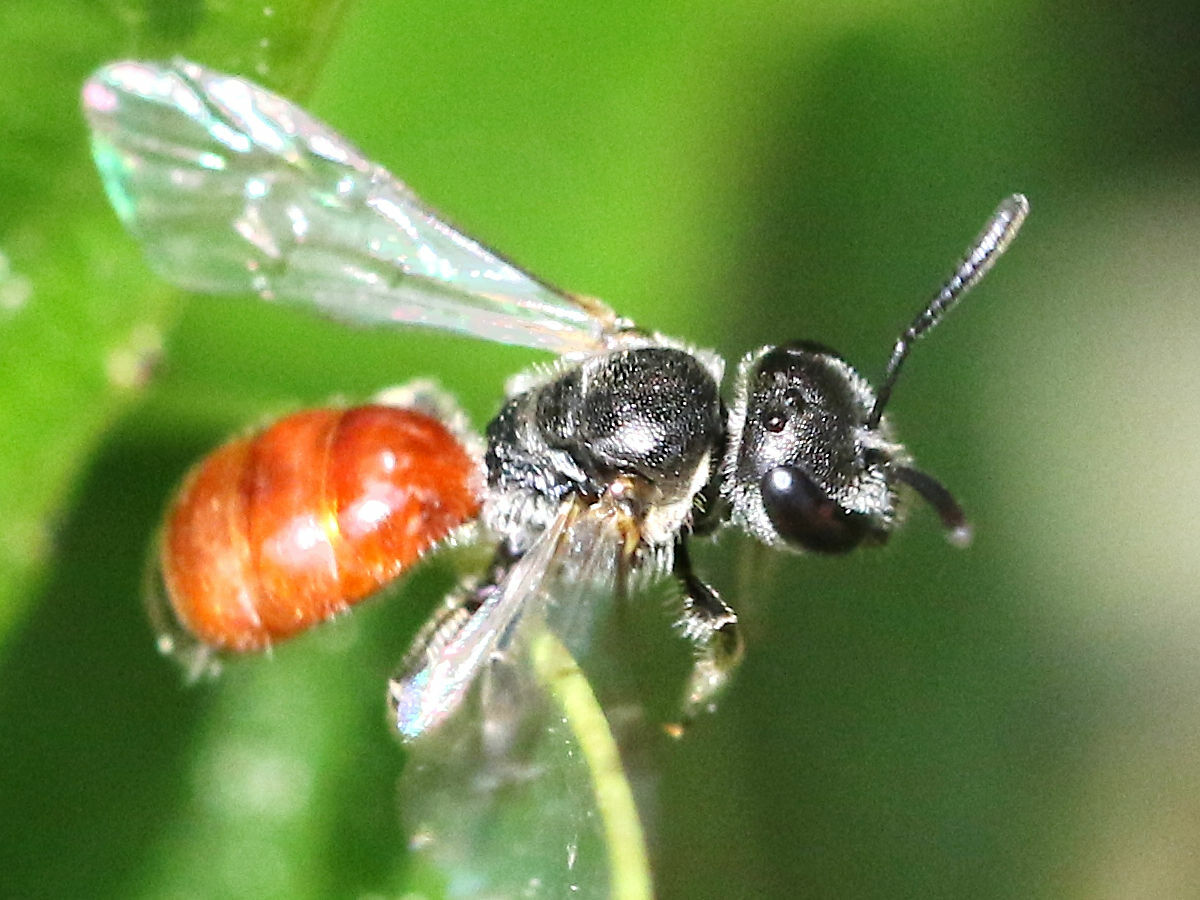

Scientific classification
- Kingdom: Animalia
- Phylum: Arthropoda
- Clade: Pancrustacea
- Class: Insecta
- Order: Hymenoptera
- Family: Halictidae
- Genus: Lasioglossum
- Species: L. pseudosphecodimorphum

Binomial name
- Lasioglossum pseudosphecodimorphum (Blüthgen, 1923)

= Lasioglossum pseudosphecodimorphum =

Species of ant

Lasioglossum pseudosphecodimorphum is a species of sweat bee in the genus Lasioglossum, subgenus Sphecodogastra.

== Range ==
This species is found east of the Mediterranean Sea: Turkey, Syria, Israel, Jordan.

== Ecology ==
Flowers visited by Lasioglossum pseudosphecodimorphum include:

- Apiaceae: Eryngium glomeratum
- Asteraceae: Centaurea cf pallescens
- Boraginaceae: Echium glomeratum
- Capparidaceae: Capparis spinosa
- Fabaceae: Ononis natrix
- Hypericaceae: Hypericum scabrum
- Lamiaceae: Nepeta sp.
- Rubiaceae: Galium sp.
