= Eryngium davisii =

Scientific classification
- Kingdom: Plantae
- Clade: Tracheophytes
- Clade: Angiosperms
- Clade: Eudicots
- Clade: Asterids
- Order: Apiales
- Family: Apiaceae
- Genus: Eryngium
- Species: E. davisii

Binomial name
- Eryngium davisii Kit Tan & Yıldız

Species of flowering plant in the carrot family

Eryngium davisii, in Turkish konya boğadikeni (meaning Konya Eryngo), is a species of flowering plant in the family Apiaceae, endemic to Turkey.

== Description and habitat ==
A short Eryngo with a number of upright stems (to 20 cm). Near the bases are many complex, smallish leaves (approx. 3 cm, leaf stalks of comparable size) that persist past flowering, whilst the stem leaves' broad stalks are spiny. The stems branch sparsely in the upper flowering parts into a narrow, display of heads, mostly yellowish-green in overall appearance but with the flowers themselves are bluish and appear late August–September. Each flower head is surrounded by 7–9 slender spine-leaves, rather equal, pale green or slightly blue, larger than the flower heads, and within a head each small flower is attended by a small simple spine. It naturally grows at high altitude. Herbarium Photos.

It is closely related to Eryngium heldreichii (Turkey) whose stem leaves' broad stalks lack the spines; and to Eryngium bourgatii (W. Europe), of which E. heldreichii used to be counted as a subspecies.

== Distribution ==
It is endemic to Turkey, in the southwest near Konya.
