= Eryngium billardieri =

Scientific classification
- Kingdom: Plantae
- Clade: Tracheophytes
- Clade: Angiosperms
- Clade: Eudicots
- Clade: Asterids
- Order: Apiales
- Family: Apiaceae
- Genus: Eryngium
- Species: E. billardierei

Binomial name
- Eryngium billardierei F.Delaroche

Species of flowering plant in the carrot family

Eryngium billardierei, Billardiere's Eryngo, in Turkish hıyarok, is a species of flowering plant in the family Apiaceae, native from Turkey and Lebanon-Syria to the Himalaya.

== Description and habitat ==
An Eryngo with a number of upright stems. Near the bases are few to many complex leaves with moderately broad lobes. The stems branch about halfway up into a loose display of many flower heads that appear July to September. The flowering parts become very blue. Each flower head is surrounded by 5–9 slender spine-leaves, usually curving down somewhat, and within a head each small flower is attended by a small simple spine (outer ones of the head may be 3-parted). It naturally grows on stony slopes and fallow fields at high altitude (subalpine and alpine).

It is allied to Eryngium kotschyi (Turkey) which has much finer leaves, and also may sometimes be confused vegetatively with Eryngium thyrsoideum, or in Transcaucasia with E. campestre.

== Distribution ==
It is native from Turkey and Lebanon-Syria to the Himalaya (Afghanistan, Iran, Iraq, Lebanon-Syria, Pakistan, Transcaucasus, Turkmenistan, Türkiye, West Himalaya).

== Uses and qualities ==
Eryngium billardieri is an aromatic herb. The body shells are eaten by peeling like bananas. It is good for hepatitis disease and fatty liver.
