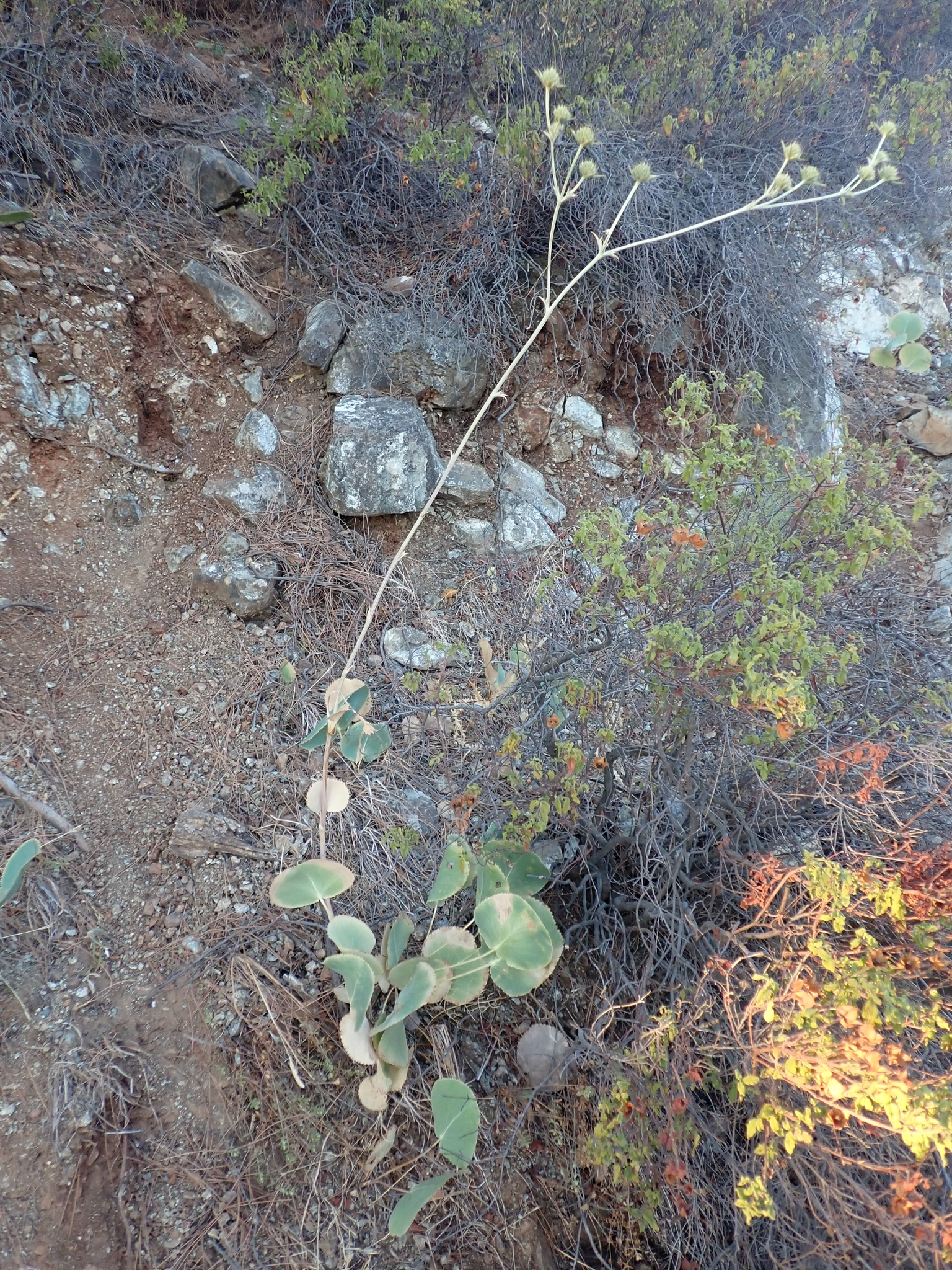

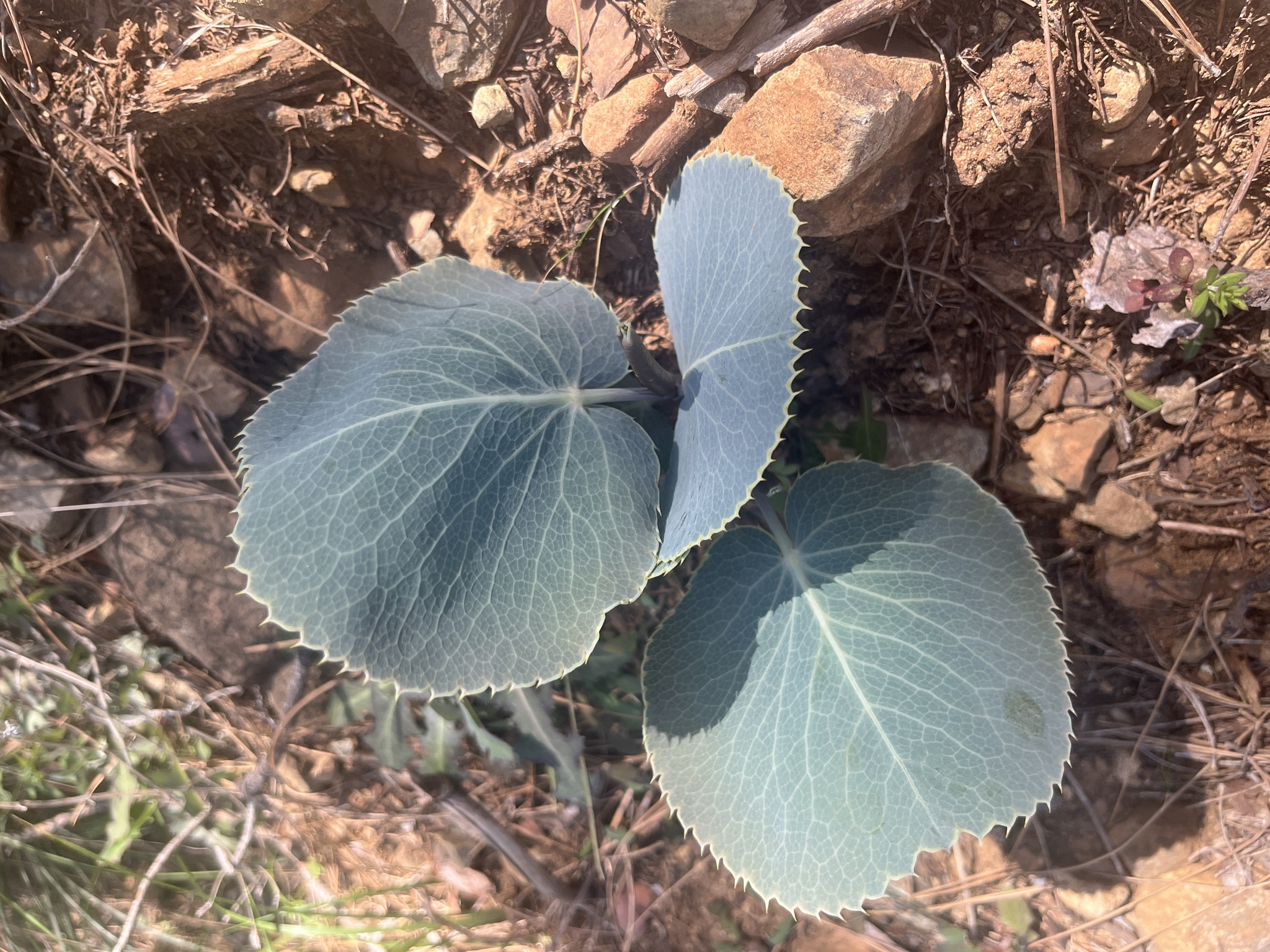

Scientific classification
- Kingdom: Plantae
- Clade: Tracheophytes
- Clade: Angiosperms
- Clade: Eudicots
- Clade: Asterids
- Order: Apiales
- Family: Apiaceae
- Genus: Eryngium
- Species: E. thorifolium

Binomial name
- Eryngium thorifolium Boiss.

= Eryngium thorifolium =

Species of flowering plant in the carrot family

Eryngium thorifolium is a species of flowering plant in the family Apiaceae, endemic to Turkey.

== Description and habitat ==
Eryngium thorifolium is an Eryngo with single tall stem (to 1.5 m), based with round, shield-like, saw-toothed greyish leaves and smaller ones up the stem, flowering with a few branches of yellowy-green flower heads. Under the heads are 6–8 spiny bract-leaves, within the heads the individual flower bracteoles are three-part.

It naturally grows on rocky serpentine soil, and apart from Eryngium pseudothorifolium, lacks close allies.

It may be confused with Eryngium pseudothorifolium, whose leaves are more wedge-topped and less indented at the base, with only 1–3 flower heads, and which grows on marly soil, and also with species of Pimpinella, such as Pimpinella flabellifolia.

== Distribution ==
It is native to the far southwest of Turkey.
