= Eryngium arenosum =

Conservation status
- Imperiled (NatureServe)

Scientific classification
- Kingdom: Plantae
- Clade: Tracheophytes
- Clade: Angiosperms
- Clade: Eudicots
- Clade: Asterids
- Order: Apiales
- Family: Apiaceae
- Genus: Eryngium
- Species: E. arenosum

Binomial name
- Eryngium arenosum C.I.Calviño & G.A.Levin

Rare species of flowering plant

Eryngium arenosum, commonly known as the sand eryngo or Sand Sheet eryngo, is a rare species of flowering plant in the carrot family, Apiaceae. It is an annual herb endemic to the South Texas Sand Sheet of southern Texas. It grows chiefly in dry sandy grasslands and along the margins of mesquite woodlands, often near seasonal wetlands.

NatureServe assigns Eryngium arenosum a global conservation rank of G2, or imperiled, as of 2019.
