= Eryngium polycephalum =

Scientific classification
- Kingdom: Plantae
- Clade: Tracheophytes
- Clade: Angiosperms
- Clade: Eudicots
- Clade: Asterids
- Order: Apiales
- Family: Apiaceae
- Genus: Eryngium
- Species: E. polycephalum

Binomial name
- Eryngium polycephalum Hausskn. ex H.Wolff

Species of flowering plant in the carrot family

Eryngium polycephalum, in Turkish başlı boğadikeni (meaning Headed Eryngo), is a species of flowering plant in the family Apiaceae, endemic to Turkey.

== Description and habitat ==
A tall yellowy-green Eryngo with a single upright stem, 50–150 cm (20–59 in). Its base leaves are few, persistent, with lobes somewhat like leaflets, particularly the terminal one, this being a distinctive feature; the stem leaves are smaller, 3-part, with an expanded stalk that conspicuously clasps the stem. Higher up, the stems display the flower heads with ever-increasing branching upwards, all being greenish-yellow, appearing July to September. At the base of each flower head is a whorl of 5–7 slender unequal spine-leaves that are equal to the head in size or smaller, and within a head each small flower is attended by a small simple spine. It naturally grows in stony steppe at high altitude of 1,450–1,850 m (4,760–6,070 ft). Photos.

It is distinguished from similar species by the semi-leafleted form of the lowest, persistent, leaves.

== Distribution ==
It is endemic to Turkey, growing to the southern, central region of the country.
