= Eryngium babadaghense =

Scientific classification
- Kingdom: Plantae
- Clade: Tracheophytes
- Clade: Angiosperms
- Clade: Eudicots
- Clade: Asterids
- Order: Apiales
- Family: Apiaceae
- Genus: Eryngium
- Species: E. babadaghense

Binomial name
- Eryngium babadaghense G.E.Genç, Akalın & Wörz

Species of flowering plant in the carrot family

Eryngium babadaghense, or baba boğadiken in Turkish, is a species of flowering plant in the carrot family Apiaceae, endemic to southwest Turkey.

== Description and habitat ==
An Eryngo with moderately sized stems, to 75 cm (30 in), and complex fine-lobed leaves, becoming bluish at maturity. Each flowerhead is surrounded by 6–10 slender spine-leaves (2–7 cm), and within the head each small flower is attended by a largish spine (9–18 mm, simple, except the outer ones may be divided into 3).

It grows in Fethiye (Muğla), southwest Turkey, at 1,400–1,700 m (4,600–5,600 ft) on serpentine ground, and takes its name from its Babadağ ("Mt. Baba") site.

In Turkey it most resembles Eryngium kotschyi, differing by its base leaves being finer (width 2–3 mm, not to 7 mm), its stem leaves being finer (0.5–1 mm not 1–2 mm) with much longer terminal lobe (6–11 cm not 5–6 cm), larger whorled leaves under the heads, among other differences; and also Eryngium glomeratum (whose leaf lobes are substantially wider), both being present in the southwest of Turkey.

== Distribution ==
It is endemic to Turkey.
