= Eryngium falcatum =

Scientific classification
- Kingdom: Plantae
- Clade: Tracheophytes
- Clade: Angiosperms
- Clade: Eudicots
- Clade: Asterids
- Order: Apiales
- Family: Apiaceae
- Genus: Eryngium
- Species: E. falcatum

Binomial name
- Eryngium falcatum F.Delaroche

Species of flowering plant in the carrot family

Eryngium falcatum, commonly known as the falcate eryngo, is a species of flowering plant in the family Apiaceae, native to the Eastern Mediterranean.

== Description and habitat ==
Eryngium falcatum is a narrow Eryngo with several tallish stems (to 1 m) that only near the top branch narrowly into a few small branches bearing a few greenish heads, the upper parts of the plant becoming bluish-grey. The lowest leaves are like spear heads, mostly withering by flowering, the higher leaves becoming like narrow serrated fingers. Each flowerhead is surrounded by 5–6 slender spine-leaves, or like narrow leaves, and within the head each small flower is attended by a comparable 3-part spine.

It is not readily confused with other Eryngo.

It naturally grows in open to semi-open wood, hillsides, dry fields, and similar habitats.

== Distribution ==
It is native to the East Aegean Islands, Lebanon-Syria, Palestine, and in Turkey along the southern edge.
