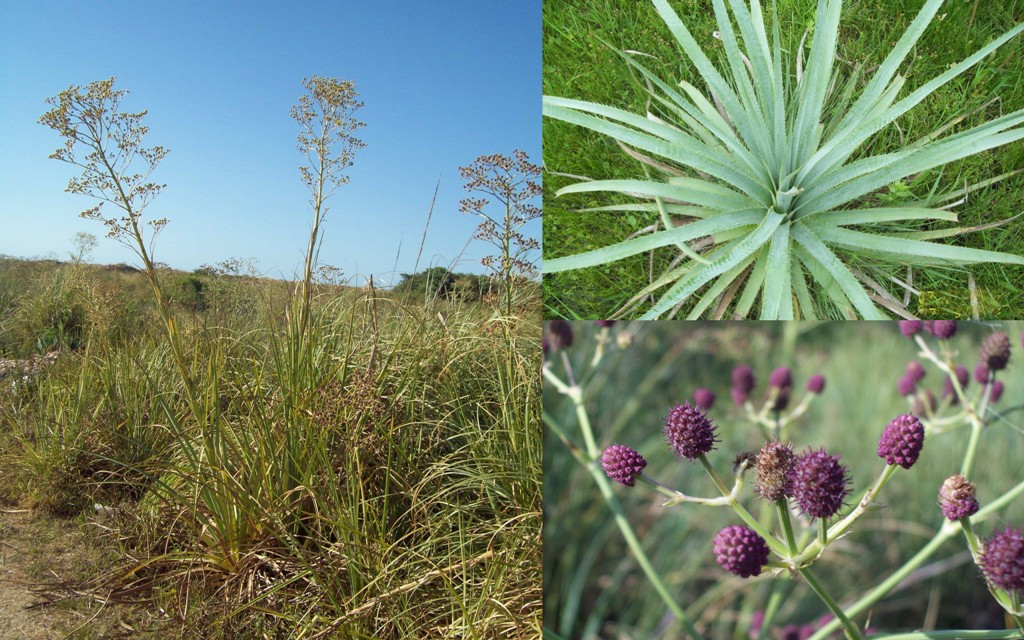

Scientific classification
- Kingdom: Plantae
- Clade: Tracheophytes
- Clade: Angiosperms
- Clade: Eudicots
- Clade: Asterids
- Order: Apiales
- Family: Apiaceae
- Genus: Eryngium
- Species: E. pandanifolium

Binomial name
- Eryngium pandanifolium Cham. & Schltdl.

Synonyms
- List: Eryngium chamissonis Urb.; Eryngium decaisneanum Urb.; Eryngium lassauxii Decne.; Eryngium oligodon (DC.) Griseb.; Eryngium pandanifolium var. atrocephalum Kuntze; Eryngium paniculatum var. oligodon DC.

= Eryngium pandanifolium =

Species of flowering plant

Eryngium pandanifolium, or pandan-like-leaved eryngo or caraguata, is a species of flowering plant in the genus Eryngium of the family Apiaceae, native to southern Brazil, Paraguay, Uruguay, and Argentina, and introduced in Australia, New Zealand, and Portugal. It has gained the Royal Horticultural Society's Award of Garden Merit. Its leaves, which closely resemble those of the unrelated Pampas grass (Cortaderia) are up to 2.7 m (8 ft 10 in) long while only 2.5 to 5 cm (0.98 to 1.97 in) wide.

== Subtaxa ==
The following varieties are currently accepted:

- Eryngium pandanifolium var. chamissonis (Urb.) Mathias & Constance
- Eryngium pandanifolium var. lassauxii (Decne.) Mathias & Constance

== Invasive species ==
Eryngium pandanifolium is legally classified as an invasive species in Portugal since 1999. It has settled in damp areas around the Tagus and Mondego river basins.
