= Eryngium bithynicum =

Scientific classification
- Kingdom: Plantae
- Clade: Tracheophytes
- Clade: Angiosperms
- Clade: Eudicots
- Clade: Asterids
- Order: Apiales
- Family: Apiaceae
- Genus: Eryngium
- Species: E. bithynicum

Binomial name
- Eryngium bithynicum Boiss.

Species of flowering plant in the carrot family

Eryngium bithynicum, in Turkish çakırotu, is a species of flowering plant in the family Apiaceae native to Turkey.

== Description and habitat ==
An Eryngo with somewhat widely-spreading diffuse display of bluish flowers on slender blue branches. The groundmost leaves spread out in a circle and are usually fairly simple or may be 2–3 lobed, and wither by flowering, the leaves above being of a different kind with more complex, broadish, toothier lobing.

It is easily confused with a number of similar Eryngo—each flowerhead is surrounded by 5(6) slender spine–leaves somewhat broadening from tip to base, and within the head each small flower is attended by a 3-part spine; inflorescence stems are strongly channeled and the flowers in a head are not numerous (usually fewer than 15). Photos.

It naturally likes steppe, fallow fields, eroded banks, 100–1,400 m (330–4,590 ft), flowering June to September.

== Distribution ==
It is native to Turkey only; its distribution in Turkey is the western half, avoiding the southern edge.
