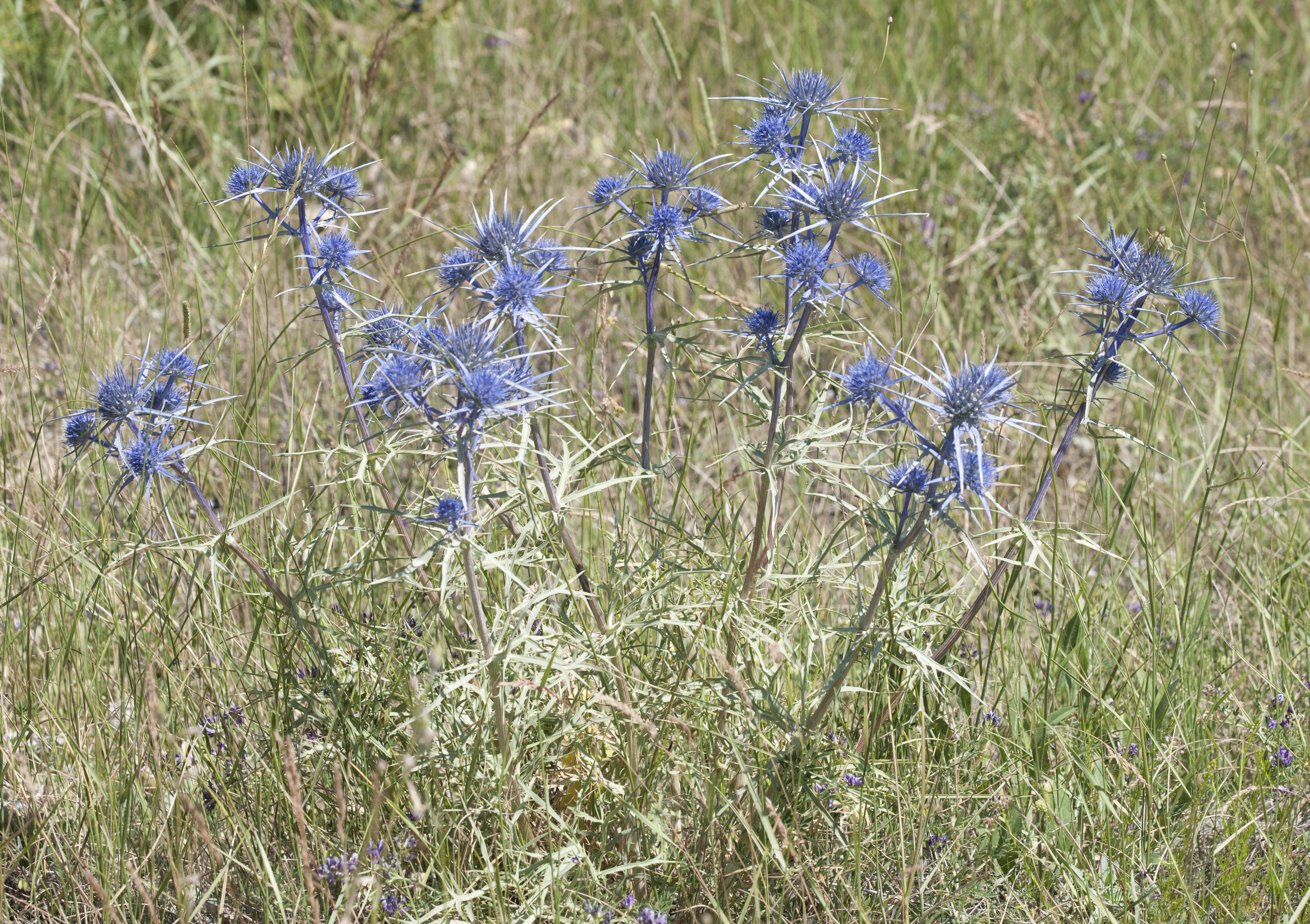

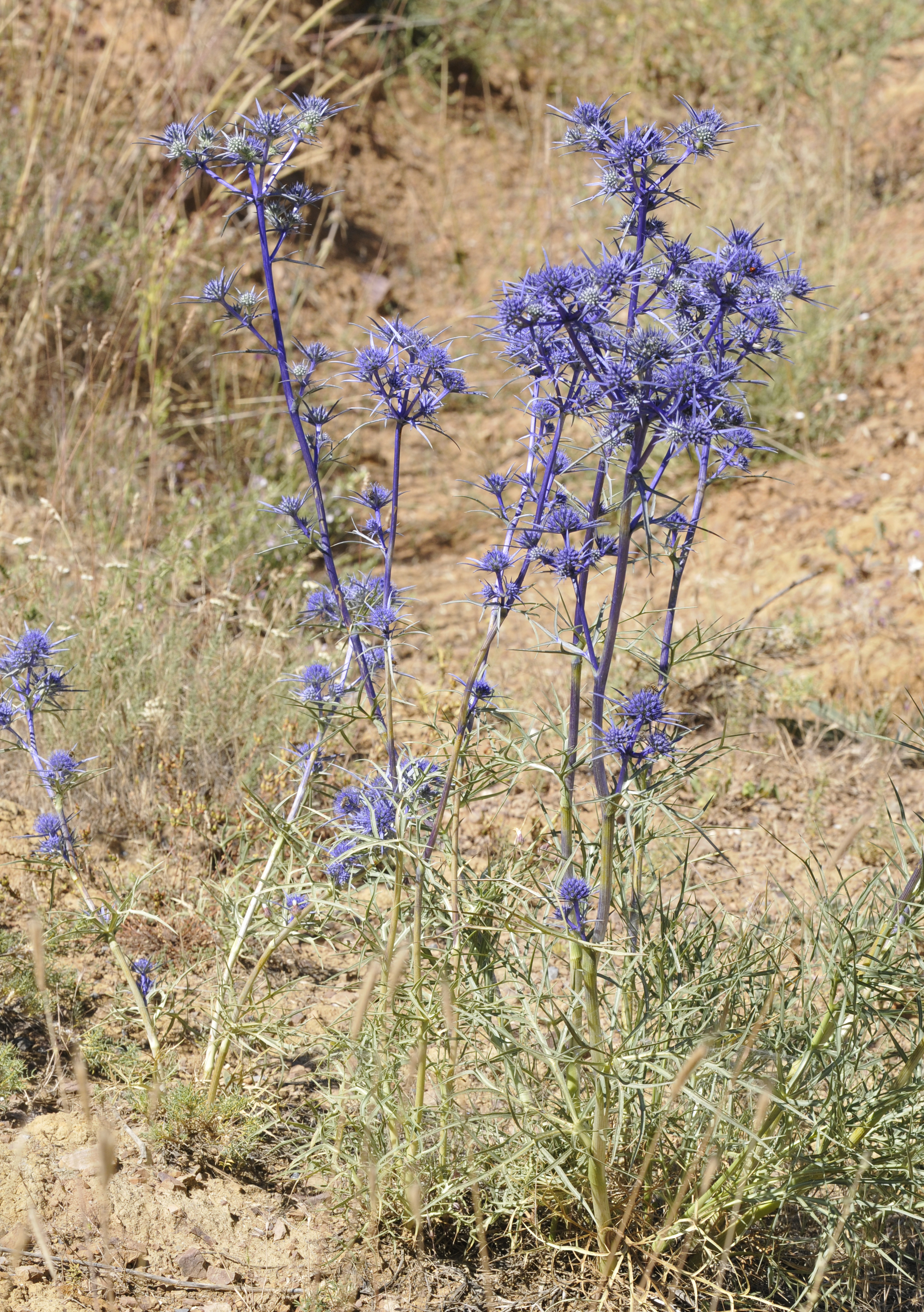

Scientific classification
- Kingdom: Plantae
- Clade: Tracheophytes
- Clade: Angiosperms
- Clade: Eudicots
- Clade: Asterids
- Order: Apiales
- Family: Apiaceae
- Genus: Eryngium
- Species: E. kotschyi

Binomial name
- Eryngium kotschyi Boiss.

= Eryngium kotschyi =

Species of flowering plant in the carrot family

Eryngium kotschyi is a species of flowering plant in the family Apiaceae, endemic to Turkey.

== Description and habitat ==
Eryngium kotschyi is an Eryngo with several narrow upright stems, many finely-divided complex leaves and branching only in the upper, flowering parts. The flowering part of each stem becomes very blue, with a moderately dense presentation of 8–20 blue flower heads, flowers appearing July–September. Each flower head is surrounded by numerous (6–15) slender spine-leaves, usually slightly curving down, and within a head each small flower is attended by a small simple spine. It naturally grows on stony slopes, 1,100–2,250 m (3,610–7,380 ft).

It is allied to Eryngium billardieri,which has much broader leaf parts. Due to its fine leaves, it might also be confused vegetatively in Turkey with Eryngium glomeratum (south and west coastal regions) or the rare Eryngium babadaghense (far southwest Turkey).

== Distribution ==
It is endemic to Turkey, where in it is found in the western half of the country with a southerly distribution.
