= Eryngium pseudothorifolium =

Scientific classification
- Kingdom: Plantae
- Clade: Tracheophytes
- Clade: Angiosperms
- Clade: Eudicots
- Clade: Asterids
- Order: Apiales
- Family: Apiaceae
- Genus: Eryngium
- Species: E. pseudothorifolium

Binomial name
- Eryngium pseudothorifolium Contandr. & Quézel

Species of flowering plant in the carrot family

Eryngium pseudothorifolium, in Turkish yalancı boğadikeni, is a species of flowering plant in the family Apiaceae endemic to SW Turkey.

== Description and habitat ==
An Eryngo with single upright stem based with roundish, shield-like, saw-toothed greyish leaves and some smaller ones up the stem, flowering with 1–3 yellowy-green flower heads. Photos.

It naturally grows on marly soil, and apart from Eryngium thorifolium lacks close allies.

It may be confused with E. thorifolium,, whose leaves are rounder-topped and much more indented at the base, with many more flower heads on some branches, and which grows on rocky serpentine soil; and also with species of Pimpinella such as Pimpinella flabellifolia.

== Distribution ==
It is native to Turkey only, in the far south-west.
