= Eryngium palmito =

Scientific classification
- Kingdom: Plantae
- Clade: Tracheophytes
- Clade: Angiosperms
- Clade: Eudicots
- Clade: Asterids
- Order: Apiales
- Family: Apiaceae
- Genus: Eryngium
- Species: E. palmito

Binomial name
- Eryngium palmito Boiss. & Heldr.

Species of flowering plant in the carrot family

Eryngium palmito, in Turkish has boğadikeni (roughly meaning Rarefied Eryngo), is a species of flowering plant in the family Apiaceae, endemic to Turkey.

== Description and Habitat ==
A moderately tall Eryngo (50 cm or more) with a small number of upright stems. Its base leaves are grassy looking, and when examined each leaf dissects into 5-7 long, grassy lobes (2–3 mm wide); the stem leaves are similar (5-divided) but less prominent, their bases sheathing the stem. The stems mature bluish-grey with a narrow display of a small number of heads, appearing August. At the base of each flower head is a whorl of 5–6 slender spine-leaves that are larger than the heads, and within a head each small flower is attended by a smallish spine, mostly simple but the outer ones may be 3-parted. It naturally grows in pine forests at high altitude (1500 m). Photos.

It is distinguished in Turkey from other Eryngium with grassy leaves by the higher number (5–7) of long grassy lobes on the base leaves, in Eryngium trisectum they are divided into 3–4(5), whilst Eryngium wanaturi leaves are undivided (to 1 cm wide). Beyond Turkey its allies are Eryngium ternatum (Crete; basal leaves dividing into 1–3 long lobes, floral bracteoles all 3-parted) and Eryngium serbicum (NW. Balkan Peninsula and Albania; basal leaves dividing into 4–5, whorled bracts 7–8).

== Distribution ==
It is endemic to Turkey, growing near the Antalya region to its north and east.
