= Eryngium trisectum =

Scientific classification
- Kingdom: Plantae
- Clade: Tracheophytes
- Clade: Angiosperms
- Clade: Eudicots
- Clade: Asterids
- Order: Apiales
- Family: Apiaceae
- Genus: Eryngium
- Species: E. trisectum

Binomial name
- Eryngium trisectum Wörz & H.Duman

Species of flowering plant in the carrot family

Eryngium trisectum, in Turkish üç boğadikeni (meaning Three Eryngo), is a species of flowering plant in the carrot family Apiaceae, endemic to Turkey.

== Description and habitat ==
A somewhat tall Eryngo (30–90 cm) with 1 or 2 upright stems. Its base leaves are grassy looking, and when examined each leaf dissects into 3–4(5) long, grassy lobes (1–3 mm wide); the stem leaves are similar (3-divided) but less prominent. The stems mature with a lilac tinge in the upper part with a display of 8–15 heads, appearing August (bumblebees visiting). At the base of each flower head is a whorl of 5–6 slender spine-leaves that are larger than the heads, and within a head each small flower is attended by a smallish simple spine. It naturally grows in open serpentine pine forest at high altitude (1,600–1,700 m (5,200–5,600 ft)) in the Central Taurus Mountains.

It is distinguished in Turkey from other Eryngium with grassy leaves by the lower number (3–4(5)) of long grassy lobes on the base leaves, in the similar Eryngium palmito (Photos) they are divided into 5–7, whilst Eryngium wanaturi leaves are undivided (to 1 cm wide). Beyond Turkey its allies are Eryngium ternatum (Crete; basal leaves dividing into 1–3 long lobes, floral bracteoles all 3–parted) and Eryngium serbicum (NW. Balkan Peninsula & Albania; basal leaves dividing into 4–5, whorled bracts 7–8).

== Distribution ==
It is endemic to Turkey, growing in the Central Taurus Mountains, known from Kızıl Dağ (mountain).
