= Eryngium heldreichii =

Scientific classification
- Kingdom: Plantae
- Clade: Tracheophytes
- Clade: Angiosperms
- Clade: Eudicots
- Clade: Asterids
- Order: Apiales
- Family: Apiaceae
- Genus: Eryngium
- Species: E. heldreichii

Binomial name
- Eryngium heldreichii Boiss.

Species of flowering plant in the carrot family

Eryngium heldreichii, the Mediterranean sea holly, in Turkish gelenkuş, is a species of flowering plant in the family Apiaceae, native to Turkey and Lebanon-Syria.

== Description and habitat ==
An Eryngo with a number of upright stems, to 50 cm (20 in). Near the bases are many complex, smallish leaves (to 4(5) cm excluding long leaf stalk) that persist past flowering. The stems branch sparsely in the higher parts into a narrow display of 3–13 flower heads. The flowering parts mature greyish, although the flowers themselves are blue, and appear July–October. Each flower head is surrounded by 7–12 slender spine-leaves, usually unequal and curving down somewhat, larger than the flower heads, and within a head each small flower is attended by a small simple spine. It naturally grows on rocky limestone slopes at high altitude (subalpine and alpine). Photos.

It is closely related to (among others) Eryngium bourgatii (W. Europe) and used to be counted as its subspecies, E. bourgatii having shorter bracts with fewer veins (3–5 not 7 veins in the outer bracts) and ovoidish (not depressed) heads, and longer bracteoles; and to Eryngium davisii (SW Turkey) whose stem leaves have spiny broad stalks

== Distribution ==
It is native to Turkey and Lebanon-Syria.
