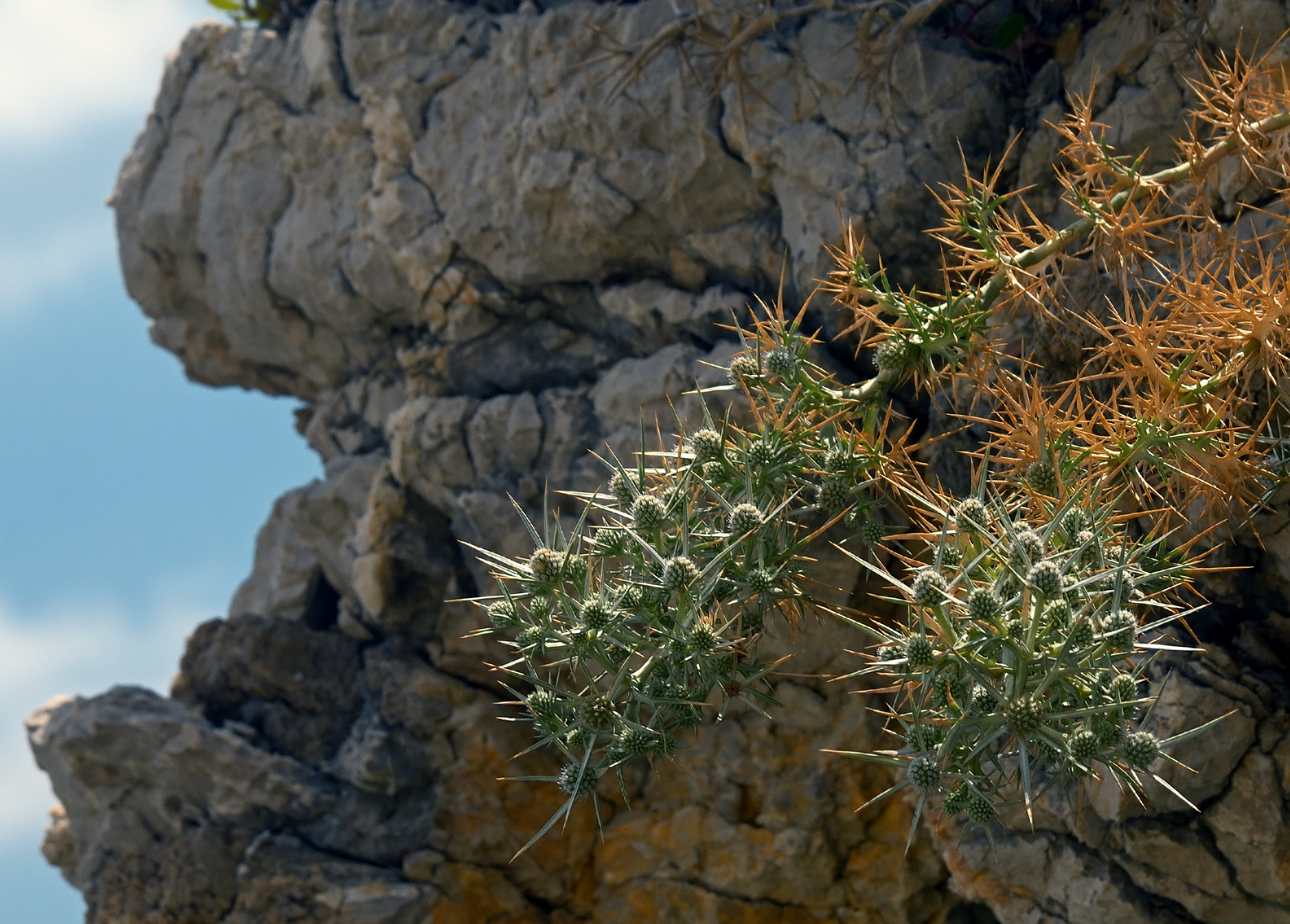

Scientific classification
- Kingdom: Plantae
- Clade: Tracheophytes
- Clade: Angiosperms
- Clade: Eudicots
- Clade: Asterids
- Order: Apiales
- Family: Apiaceae
- Genus: Eryngium
- Species: E. glomeratum

Binomial name
- Eryngium glomeratum Lam, 1798

= Eryngium glomeratum =

Species of flowering plant in the carrot family

Eryngium glomeratum, known as the clustered eryngo, or ball eryngo, is a species of flowering plant in the family Apiaceae, native from Greece through to Saudi Arabia, and Tunisia.

== Description and habitat ==
An Eryngo with numerous narrow tallish stems (to 60(100) cm) with many finely divided leaves, and a dense cylindrical presentation of flowerheads, the whole plant maturing greyish-green. Each flowerhead is surrounded by 5–6 slender spine-leaves, usually long, and within a head each small flower is attended by a small simple spine. It naturally grows in rocky places.

It is allied to Eryngium amethystinum (Europe) and Eryngium desertorum (Syria). Due to the fine leaves, it might also be confused vegetatively with Eryngium kotschyi (Turkey) or the rare Eryngium babadaghense (SW Turkey).

== Distribution ==
Eryngium glomeratum is native to Cyprus, East Aegean Island, Greece, Iraq, Crete, Lebanon-Syria, Palestine, Saudi Arabia, Sinai, Tunisia, and Turkey. In Turkey, it is found in the south and west coastal regions.
