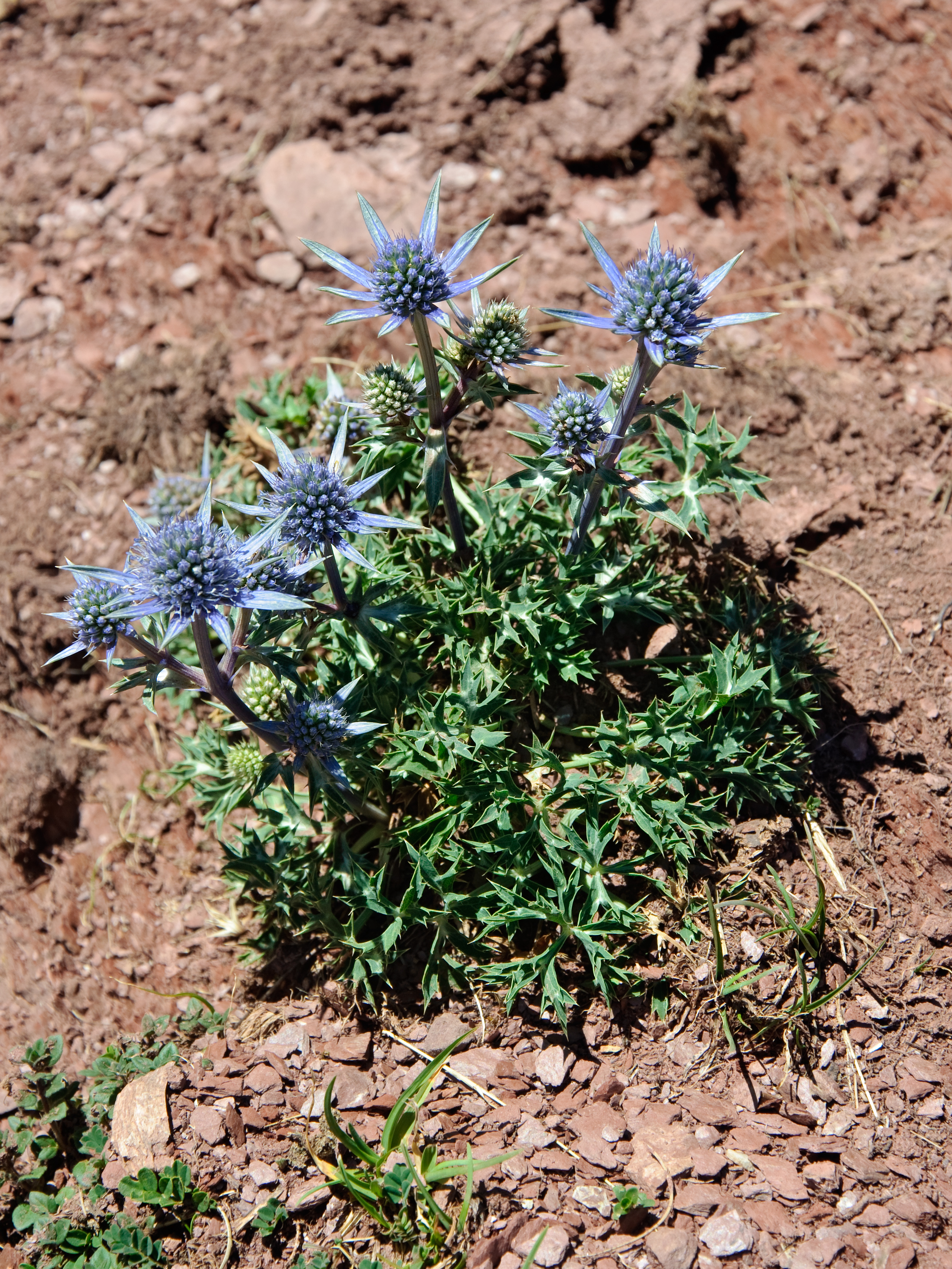

Scientific classification
- Kingdom: Plantae
- Clade: Tracheophytes
- Clade: Angiosperms
- Clade: Eudicots
- Clade: Asterids
- Order: Apiales
- Family: Apiaceae
- Genus: Eryngium
- Species: E. bourgatii

Binomial name
- Eryngium bourgatii Gouan

Varieties
- Eryngium bourgatii var. atlanticum Ball; Eryngium bourgatii var. bourgatii

= Eryngium bourgatii =

Species of flowering plant

Eryngium bourgatii, the Mediterranean sea holly (also known as Pyrenean eryngo), is a species of flowering plant in the family Apiaceae native to Andorra, France, Spain, and Morocco. It is an herbaceous perennial, growing to 15–45 cm (6–18 in) tall. The spherical, blue flowerheads have typically spiny bracts.

The species was named after a French medical doctor named Bourgat who collected plants in the Pyrenees in the company of Antoine Gouan, the author of the species, between 1766 and 1767.

== Distribution ==
Eryngium bourgatii is fairly common in Spain, where it may be found growing as far south as Andalucía and further inland in Castile and León, as well as in the Community of Madrid and in Extremadura, among other locations. However, the plant is mostly found within the Pyrenees and in Spain's northern coastal regions—hence the common name Pyrenean eryngo—where it is known from eastern Galicia and Asturias through Cantabria and the Basque Country, eastward into Andorra and some inland parts of Catalonia. In southwestern France, it grows throughout the Pyrenees, straddling the Spanish-French border and growing on either side.

== Infraspecifics ==
Two varieties are accepted:

- Eryngium bourgatii var. atlanticum Ball – Morocco and Spain
- Eryngium bourgatii var. bourgatii – Pyrenees (France and Spain) and northern and central Spain

The former Eryngium bourgatii subsp. heldreichii (Boiss.) P.H.Davis, found in Turkey and Lebanon-Syria, is now Eryngium heldreichii

== Uses ==
=== Cultivation ===
Numerous cultivars have been produced within the horticultural and plant trades, of which 'Oxford Blue' has gained the Royal Horticultural Society's Award of Garden Merit.
