= List of Saxifragaceae genera =

List of genera in the plant family Saxifragaceae

The family Saxifragaceae has about 40 accepted genera, according to Plants of the World Online.

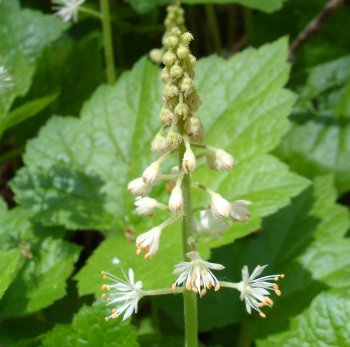
Tiarella (Foamflower)

- Asimitellaria (Wakab.) R.A.Folk & Y.Okuyama
- Astilbe Buch.-Ham. ex D.Don – false goat's-beards
- Astilboides Engl.
- Bensoniella C.V.Morton – Oregon bensoniella
- Bergenia Moench
- Bolandra A.Gray – false coolworts
- Boykinia Nutt. – brookfoams (including Telesonix Raf.)
- Brewerimitella (Engl.) R.A.Folk & Y.Okuyama
- Cascadia A.M.Johnson
- Chrysosplenium L. – golden-saxifrages
- Conimitella Rydb.
- Darmera Voss – Indian rhubarb (synonym Peltiphyllum)
- Elmera Rydb.
- Hemieva Raf.
- Heuchera L. – Coral bells
- Hieronymusia Engl.
- Jepsonia Small
- Leptarrhena R.Br.
- Lithophragma (Nutt.) Torr. & A.Gray – woodlandstars
- Micranthes Haw.
- Mitella Tourn. ex L. – miterworts
- Mitellastra (Nutt. ex Torr. & A.Gray) Howell
- Mukdenia Koidz. – mukdenias
- Oresitrophe Bunge
- Ozomelis Raf.
- Pectiantia Raf.
- Peltoboykinia (Engl.) H.Hara
- Rodgersia A.Gray
- Saniculiphyllum C.Y.Wu & T.C.Ku
- Saxifraga Tourn. ex L. – Saxifrages (including Saxifragella Engl.)
- Saxifragodes D.M.Moore
- Saxifragopsis Small (sometimes included in Saxifraga)
- Spuriomitella (H.Boissieu) R.A.Folk & Y.Okuyama
- Suksdorfia A.Gray (including Hieronymusia)
- Sullivantia Torr. & A.Gray – coolworts
- Tanakaea Franch. & Sav.
- Telesonix Raf.
- Tellima R.Br. – Fringecups
- Tiarella L. – foamflowers
- Tolmiea Torr. & A.Gray – Piggyback plant

The family does not include the genus Sassafras, despite the possibly related Latin etymology of the names.

== Bibliography ==
- Byng, James W. (2014). "Saxifragales". The Flowering Plants Handbook: A practical guide to families and genera of the world. Plant Gateway Ltd. pp. 156–166. ISBN 978-0-9929993-1-5.
- Christenhusz, Maarten J. M.; Fay, Michael F.; Chase, Mark W. (2017). "Saxifragales". Plants of the World: An Illustrated Encyclopedia of Vascular Plants. University of Chicago Press. pp. 231–244. ISBN 978-0-226-52292-0.
- Christenhusz, Maarten JM & Byng, J. W. (2016). "The number of known plants species in the world and its annual increase". Phytotaxa. 261 (3). Magnolia Press: 201–217. doi:10.11646/phytotaxa.261.3.1.
- Deng, Jia-bin; Drew, Bryan T.; Mavrodiev, Evgeny V.; Gitzendanner, Matthew A.; Soltis, Pamela S.; Soltis, Douglas E. (February 2015). "Phylogeny, divergence times, and historical biogeography of the angiosperm family Saxifragaceae". Molecular Phylogenetics and Evolution. 83: 86–98. doi:10.1016/j.ympev.2014.11.011. PMID 25479063.
- Soltis, Douglas E.; Morgan, David R.; Grable, Albert; Soltis, Pamela S.; Kuzoff, Robert (September 1993). "Molecular Systematics of Saxifragaceae Sensu Stricto". American Journal of Botany. 80 (9): 1056. doi:10.2307/2445753. JSTOR 2445753.
