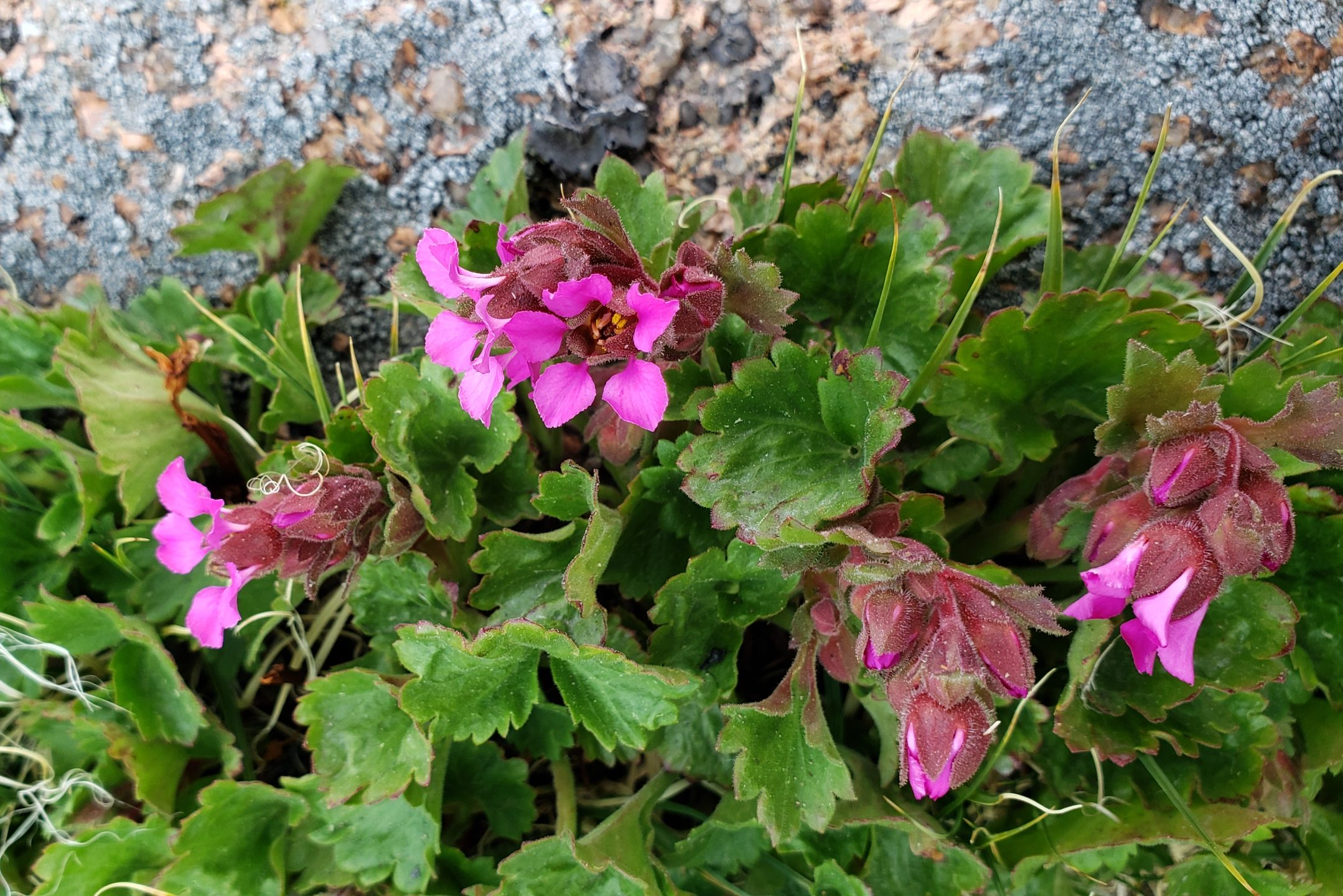

Conservation status
- Vulnerable (NatureServe)

Scientific classification
- Kingdom: Plantae
- Clade: Tracheophytes
- Clade: Angiosperms
- Clade: Eudicots
- Order: Saxifragales
- Family: Saxifragaceae
- Genus: Telesonix
- Species: T. jamesii

Binomial name
- Telesonix jamesii Rafinesque 1837

Synonyms
- Boykinia jamesii (Torrey) Engler; Saxifraga jamesii Torrey; Therofon jamesii (Torrey) Wheelock

= Telesonix jamesii =

Species of plant

Telesonix jamesii is a species of flowering plant in the saxifrage family native to the Rocky Mountains of North American. Common names include James' false saxifrage, James's saxifrage, or James' telesonix. It is a rare species, endemic to rocky, high elevation habitats with granitic substrates in the southern Rocky Mountains of Colorado and possibly New Mexico and Wyoming. It is closely related to Telesonix heucheriformis, which has at times been considered a variety of Telesonix jamesii.
