= Tanaka Yoshio =

Japanese politician

Baron Tanaka Yoshio
- 田中 芳男
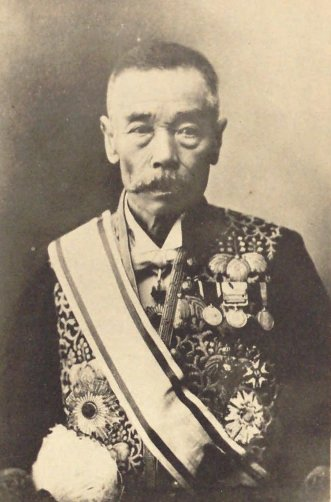
- Tanaka in 1916

Member of the House of Peers
- In office 29 September 1890 – 22 June 1916 Nominated by the Emperor

Member of the Genrōin
- In office 25 June 1883 – 20 October 1890

Personal details
- Born: Tanaka Yoshisuke; 27 September 1838 Iida, Shinano, Japan
- Died: 22 June 1916 (aged 77) Hongō, Tokyo, Japan
- Resting place: Yanaka Cemetery
- Occupation: Civil servant, naturalist
- Notable work: Yuyo Shokubutsu Zusetsu ("Illustrated Book of Useful Plants"), 1891; Dai Nihon Noshi ("Agriculture in Greater Japan"), 1891

Tanaka Yoshio (田中 芳男; 27 September 1838 – 22 June 1916) was a Japanese civil servant and naturalist.

Born to a doctor of Traditional Chinese Medicine in Iida, Shinano Province, Tanaka studied pharmacognosy in his youth with Keisuke Ito. In 1861 he moved to Edo and joined the Bansho Shirabesho (Office for the Investigation of Foreign Documents) the following year. In this job, he worked on the documentation of local produce. He was part of the Japanese delegation at the 1867 Exposition Universelle in Paris, where he exhibited a number of entomological specimens; this journey also gave him the opportunity to learn about Western museum curation.

After the Meiji Restoration, the Japanese Civil Service was reorganised. Within the Daigaku (later the Ministry of Education) Tanaka joined the Bureau of Local Products, and then moved to the Museums Bureau in 1871. A decade later, his services were sought by the Ministry of Agriculture and Commerce to oversee the menagerie attached to the National Museum of Natural History; Tanaka took advantage of the opportunity to create Ueno Zoo. Opened in 1882, it was Japan's first zoological park. The creation of the zoo resulted in Tanaka's promotion to Director-General of the Natural History Bureau, however he received little ministerial support for his botanical and zoological planning and resigned from the post the following year.

In 1878 he helped to set up a school of agriculture in Komaba (which later became the University of Tokyo's Faculty of Agriculture) and in subsequent years was responsible for the founding of several societies, including the Dainippon Nokai ("Greater Japan Agricultural Society"), the Dainippon Sanrinkai ("Greater Japan Forestry Society") and the Dainippon Suisankai ("Greater Japan Fisheries Society"). He also published several books on botany and agriculture.

In 1890 he was elevated to the House of Peers and in 1915 he was granted the title of danshaku (baron).

Tanaka died in 1916. The Saxifragaceae species Tanakaea radicans is named after him.

The standard author abbreviation Yo.Tanaka is used to indicate this person as the author when citing a botanical name.
