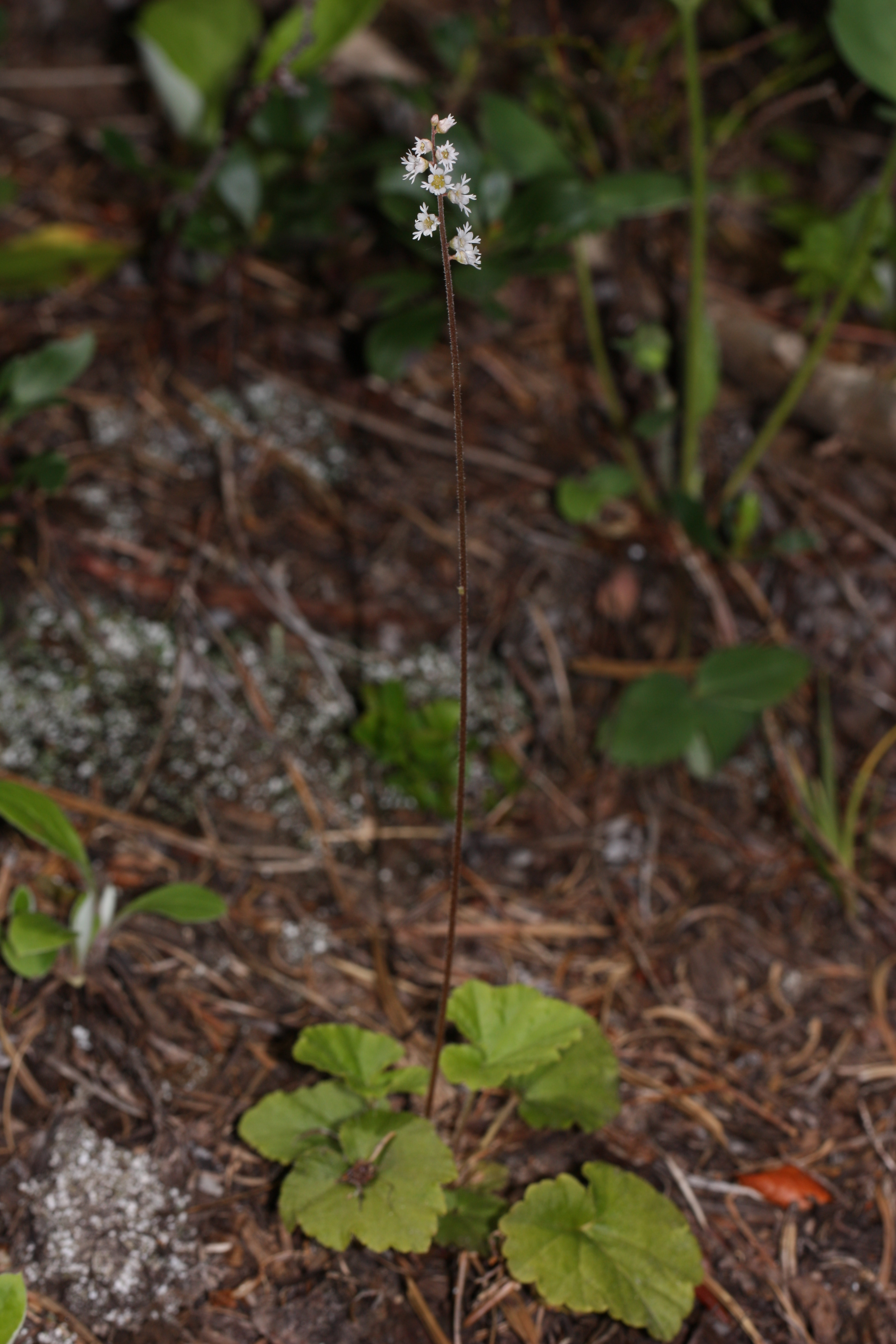

Scientific classification
- Kingdom: Plantae
- Clade: Tracheophytes
- Clade: Angiosperms
- Clade: Eudicots
- Order: Saxifragales
- Family: Saxifragaceae
- Genus: Ozomelis
- Species: O. trifida

Binomial name
- Ozomelis trifida (Graham) Rydb. (1905)

Synonyms
- Lithophragma nudicaulis Nutt. (1840); Mitella trifida Graham (1829) (basionym); Mitellopsis trifida (Graham) Walp. (1843); Mitella anomala Piper (1899); Mitella micrantha Piper (1899); Mitella pacifica (Rydb.) Fedde (1906); Mitella trifida var. integripetala Rose (1896); Mitella trifida f. micrantha Rosend. (1914); Mitella trifida var. violacea (Rydb.) Rosend. (1905); Mitella violacea Rydb. (1897); Mitellopsis hookeri Meisn. (1837); Ozomelis anomala (Piper) Rydb. (1905); Ozomelis micrantha (Piper) Rydb. (1905); Ozomelis pacifica Rydb. (1905); Ozomelis varians Raf. (1837); Ozomelis violacea (Rydb.) Rydb. (1905)

= Ozomelis trifida =

Species of flowering plant

Ozomelis trifida is a species of flowering plant in the saxifrage family known by the common names threeparted miterwort and Pacific miterwort. It is native to western North America from Alaska to Montana to California, where it grows in wet wooded habitat types. It is a rhizomatous perennial herb growing up to about 45 centimeters tall. The leaves occur around the base of the stem. They have rounded blades up to 10 centimeters wide and lobed, round-toothed edges. The erect inflorescence bears up to 20 flowers, usually along one side of the stem. The distinctive flower is cup-shaped with five white or violet-tinged petals which are usually, but not always, divided into three lance-shaped lobes.
