= Coolwort =

Coolwort or cool-wort can refer to a number of plants including:

- Coolwort, Sullivantia
  - Hapeman's coolwort, Sullivantia hapemanii or Sullivantia hapemanii var. hapemanii
  - Oregon coolwort, Sullivantia oregana
  - Sullivant's coolwort, Sullivantia sullivantii
- Coolwort, Tiarella
  - White coolwort, Tiarella cordifolia
- Coolwort, Pilea pumila
- False coolwort, Bolandra
  - Sierra false coolwort, Bolandra californica
  - Northern false coolwort, Bolandra oregana
