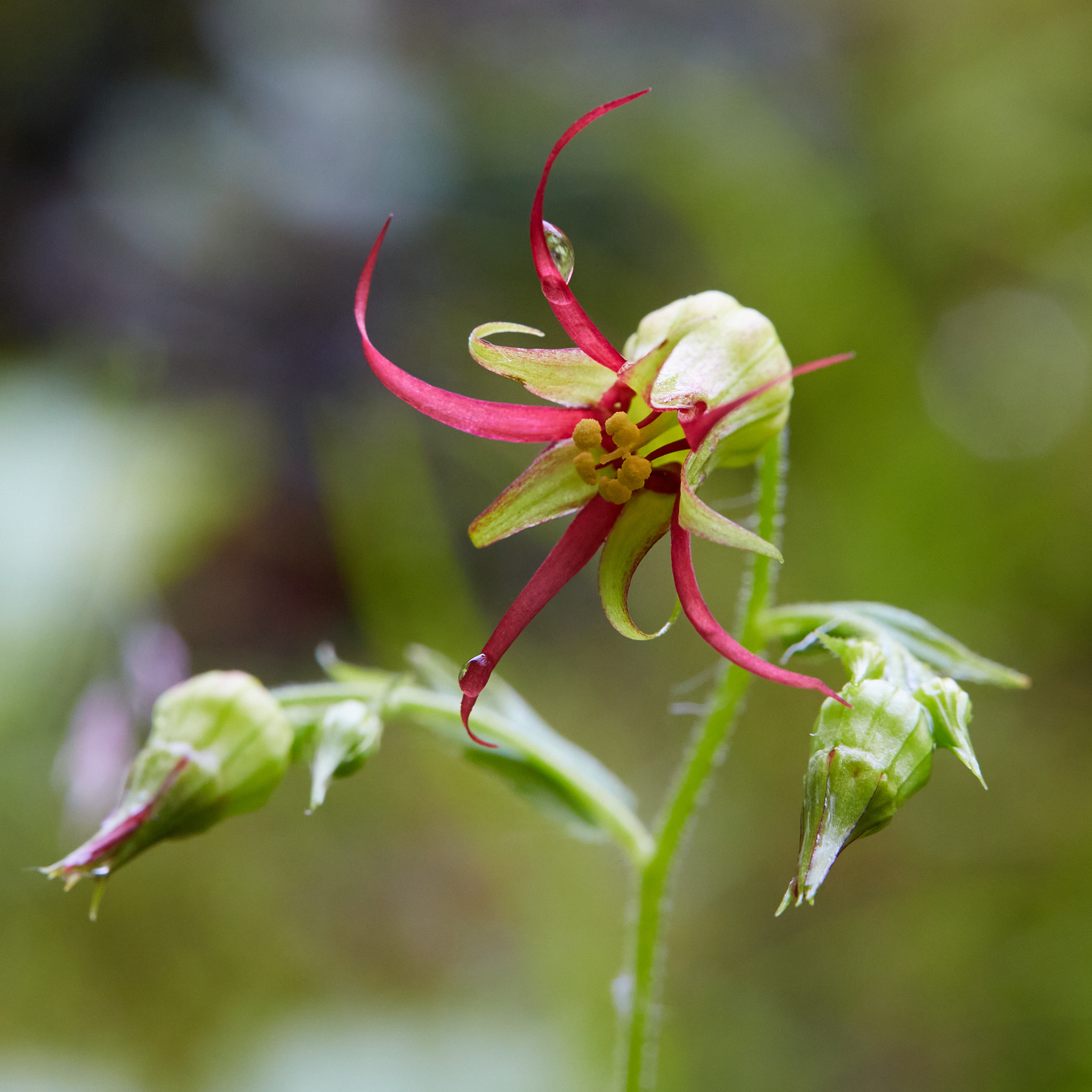

Scientific classification
- Kingdom: Plantae
- Clade: Tracheophytes
- Clade: Angiosperms
- Clade: Eudicots
- Order: Saxifragales
- Family: Saxifragaceae
- Genus: Bolandra
- Species: B. oregana

Binomial name
- Bolandra oregana S.Watson

= Bolandra oregana =

Species of plant

Bolandra oregana is a species of flowering plant in the saxifrage family. It is commonly known as Oregon bolandra or northern false coolwort and is endemic to Idaho, Washington and Oregon. It is a perennial herb which grows up to 2 ft (0.61 m) tall. It is distributed along the Columbia River Gorge as well as the Snake River and its tributaries. It grows around moist, mossy rocks and riparian habitats.
