= Spuriomitella =

Scientific classification
- Kingdom: Plantae
- Clade: Tracheophytes
- Clade: Angiosperms
- Clade: Eudicots
- Order: Saxifragales
- Family: Saxifragaceae
- Genus: Spuriomitella (H.Boissieu) R.A.Folk & Y.Okuyama (2021)
- Species: S. integripetala

Binomial name
- Spuriomitella integripetala (Boissieu) R.A.Folk & Y.Okuyama (2021)

Synonyms
- Mitella integripetala Boissieu (1897)

Genus of flowering plants

Spuriomitella integripetala is a species of flowering plant in the saxifrage family, Saxifragaceae. It is the sole species in genus Spuriomitella. It is a perennial or rhizomataceous geophyte native to northern Japan, where it grows in southern Hokkaido and northern Honshu.
