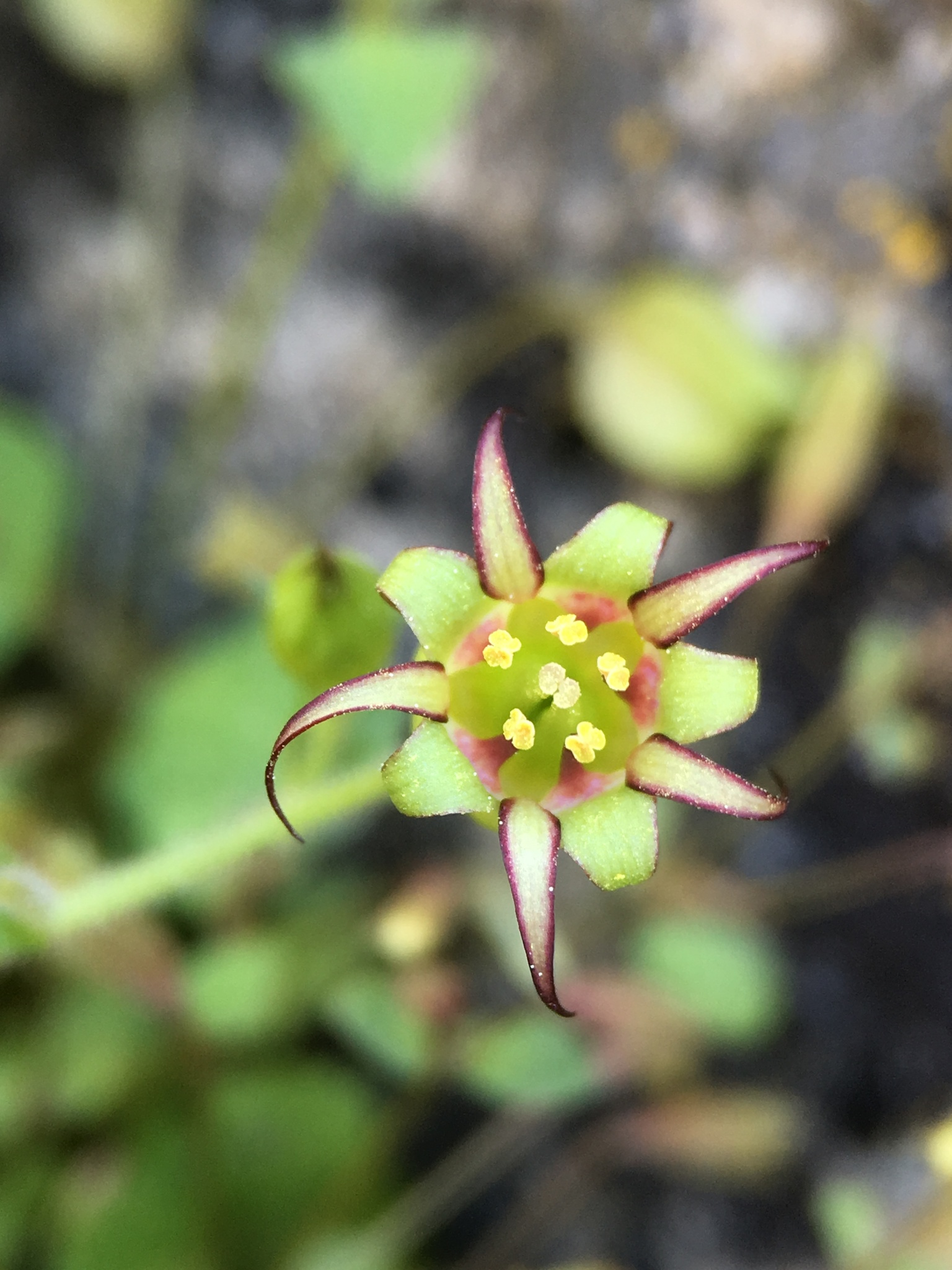

Conservation status
- Apparently Secure (NatureServe)

Scientific classification
- Kingdom: Plantae
- Clade: Tracheophytes
- Clade: Angiosperms
- Clade: Eudicots
- Order: Saxifragales
- Family: Saxifragaceae
- Genus: Bolandra
- Species: B. californica

Binomial name
- Bolandra californica A.Gray

= Bolandra californica =

Species of plant

Bolandra californica is a species of flowering plant in the saxifrage family, known by the common names Sierra bolandra and Sierra false coolwort. It is one of two species in the small genus Bolandra. It is endemic to the High Sierra Nevada of California, where it is an uncommon member of the coniferous forest understory.

This is a perennial herb growing from a caudex, producing a few sharp-lobed leaves up to ten centimeters long. The inflorescence is a tall panicle reaching up to 60 centimeters (24 in) in height and topped with small flowers. Each flower is a cup-shaped body with five lobes curling back at the mouth. Five thin, sharp-pointed petals curl out from the mouth, each long and green with purple edges.
