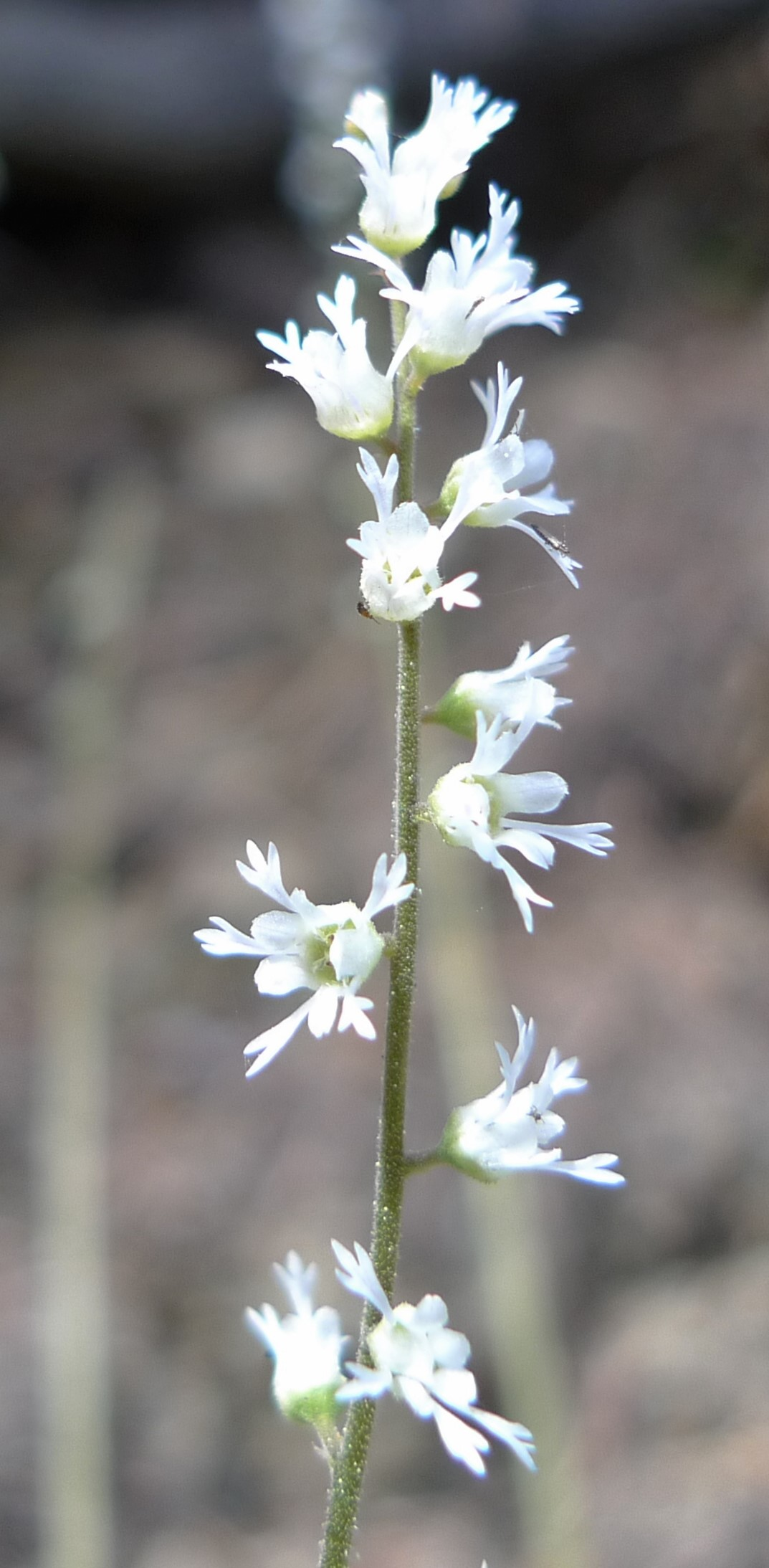
- Ozomelis trifida flower spike

Scientific classification
- Kingdom: Plantae
- Clade: Embryophytes
- Clade: Tracheophytes
- Clade: Spermatophytes
- Clade: Angiosperms
- Clade: Eudicots
- Order: Saxifragales
- Family: Saxifragaceae
- Tribe: Heuchereae
- Genus: Ozomelis; Raf.

Species
- See text

= Ozomelis =

Genus of flowering plants

Ozomelis is a small genus of flowering plants in the family Saxifragaceae, native to Alaska, western Canada and the western United States. It is probably sister to Heuchera.

== Species ==
The following species are accepted:

- Ozomelis diversifolia (Greene) Rydb.
- Ozomelis stauropetala (Piper) Rydb.
- Ozomelis trifida (Graham) Rydb.
