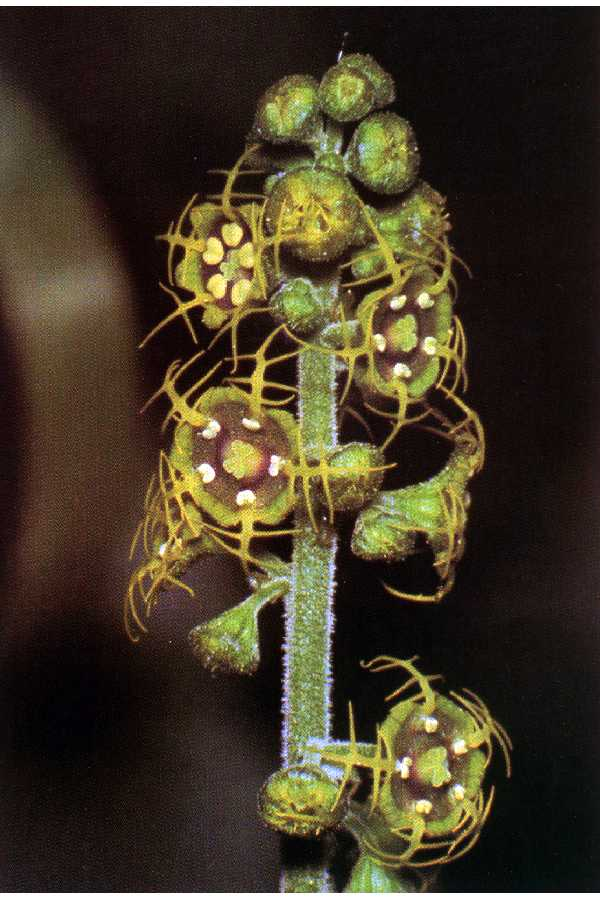

Scientific classification
- Kingdom: Plantae
- Clade: Tracheophytes
- Clade: Angiosperms
- Clade: Eudicots
- Order: Saxifragales
- Family: Saxifragaceae
- Genus: Pectiantia; Raf. (1837)
- Species: P. pentandra

Binomial name
- Pectiantia pentandra (Hook.) Rydb. (1905)

Synonyms
- Drummondia mitelloides DC. (1830); Mitella latiflora (Rydb.) Fedde (1906); Mitella pentandra Hook. (1829) (basionym); Mitella pentandra f. maxima Rosend. (1914); Mitella pentandra f. stolonifera Rosend. (1914); Mitellopsis drummondii Meisn. (1837); Mitellopsis pentandra (Hook.) Walp. (1843); Pectiantia latiflora Rydb. (1905); Pectiantia mitelloides Raf. (1837)

= Pectiantia =

Species of flowering plant

Pectiantia pentandra (synonym Mitella pentandra) is a species of flowering plant in the Saxifrage Family (Saxifragaceae), known by the common names fivestamen miterwort or five-point bishop's cap.

== Range and habitat ==
Pectiantia pentandra is native to much of western North America from Alaska to California to Colorado, where it grows in moist, shady habitat such as meadows, woods, and mountain forests. In the Sierra Nevada, it grows at elevations between 5,000 and 8,300 feet (1,500 and 2,500 m) and can be found in stream banks and wet meadows.

== Description ==
Pectiantia pentandra is a rhizomatous perennial herb growing up to about 50 to 60 centimetres (20 to 24 in) tall. The leaves have oval blades several centimeters wide with edges divided into toothed lobes, and occur mostly around the base of the stem.

The erect inflorescence bears several flowers, sometimes up to 25, usually along one side of the stem. The distinctive flower is saucer-shaped with five green petals which are divided into narrow, whiskerlike lobes.
