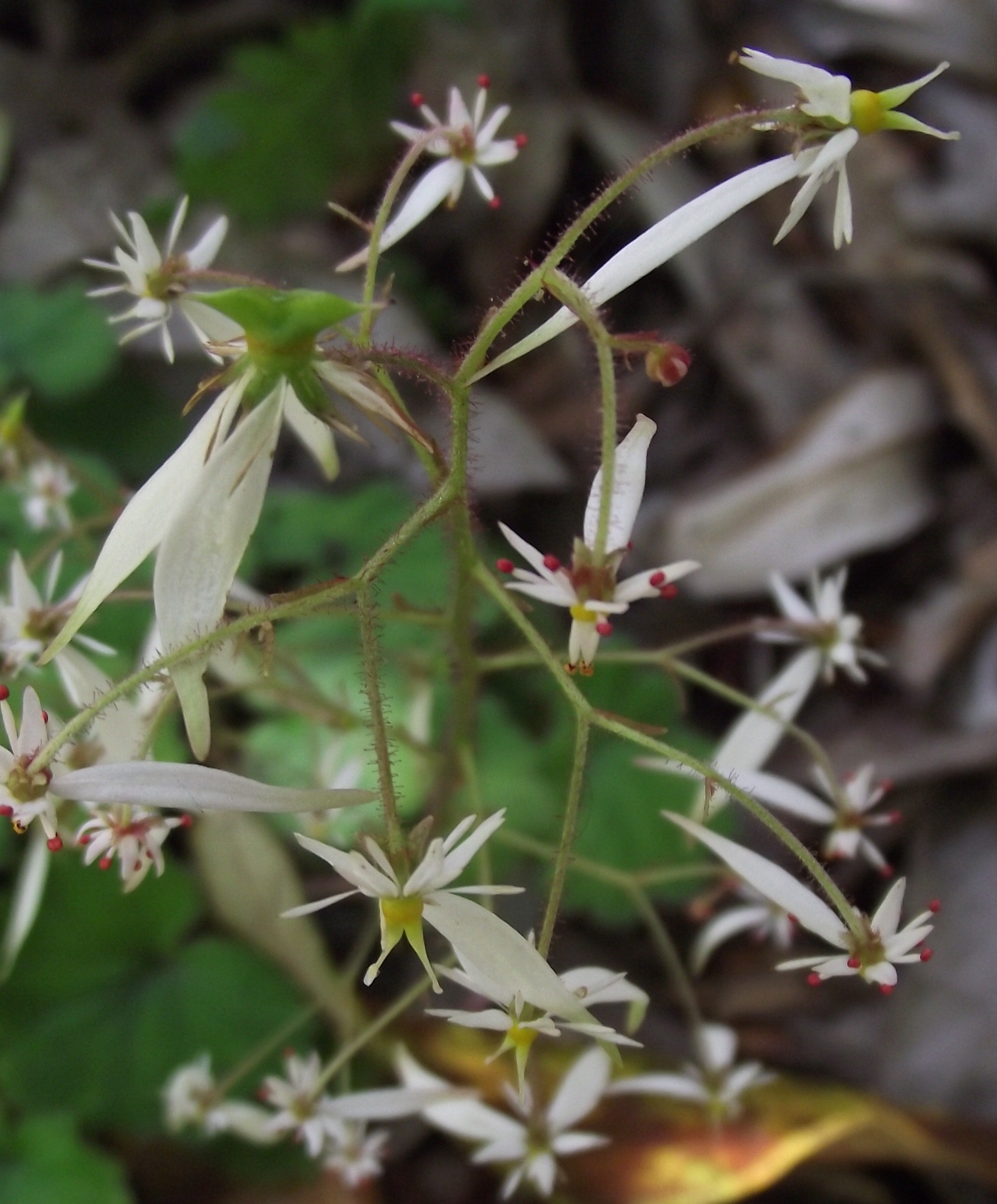
- Saxifraga rufescens at the UC Botanical Garden, Berkeley, California, USA.

Scientific classification
- Kingdom: Plantae
- Clade: Tracheophytes
- Clade: Angiosperms
- Clade: Eudicots
- Order: Saxifragales
- Family: Saxifragaceae
- Genus: Saxifraga
- Species: S. rufescens

Binomial name
- Saxifraga rufescens Balf.f.

= Saxifraga rufescens =

Species of flowering plant

Saxifraga rufescens is a herbaceous plant in the family Saxifragaceae. It is a perennial and grows primarily in the subalpine or subarctic biome.

== Description ==
In 1916, the Saxifraga rufescens plant described by Balfour came through the botanical collector George Forrest who noticed it in China. The plant was close to Saxifraga cortusifolia but distinct in its "densely red-hairy flower-shoots and the petals flushed with red."

The plants grow between 16 and 40 cm in height with rather long rhizomes beneath. Its petiole is between 1.6 and 3.7 cm in length with glandular hairy, base cordate to reniform, or cuneate to truncate. The flowers have five petals and are from white to pink in colour. Usually, their shortest four petals lanceolate. Its stamens are between 4.5 mm and 5.5 mm. The ovary ovoid is between 1.3 and 2.5 mm. The plant flowers from April to June.

Taxonomist Jin Tang Pan described the var. uninervata in 1991. Pan along with C. Y. Wu described the var. flabellifolia in 1991. Thereby, the three accepted varieties are,

- Saxifraga rufescens var. rufescens (1916)
- Saxifraga rufescens var. flabellifolia C. Y. Wu & J. T. Pan (1991)
- Saxifraga rufescens var. uninervata J. T. Pan (1991)

Pan and Wu's analysis in 1991 led to identifying var. flabellifolia as S. rufescens. Thereby, it changed the separate taxonomy created by French botanist Louis René Marie François Morot in 1894 as S. flabellifolia. However, some argue that this variety needs a separate taxonomical recognition due to its distinctive leaf shape. Therefore, the name S. zhejiangensis has also been proposed. The leaf blade is usually cuneate to truncate at base.

In Pan's description of var. uninervata, compared to var. rufescens, the leaf blades have a cordate base, and is never cuneate or truncate. The petals have a margin that is not glandular-ciliate; they are only single-veined.

== Distribution and habitat ==
The native range of S. rufescens var. rufescens is Tibet, Sichuan, west Hubei, Yunnan in China to Myanmar. It is a perennial and grows primarily in the subalpine or subarctic biome. It grows in forests and its margins, scrubs, alpine meadows, rock crevices, slopes, wetlands at sides of valleys. It is usually found between the altitudes of 600m and 4000m.

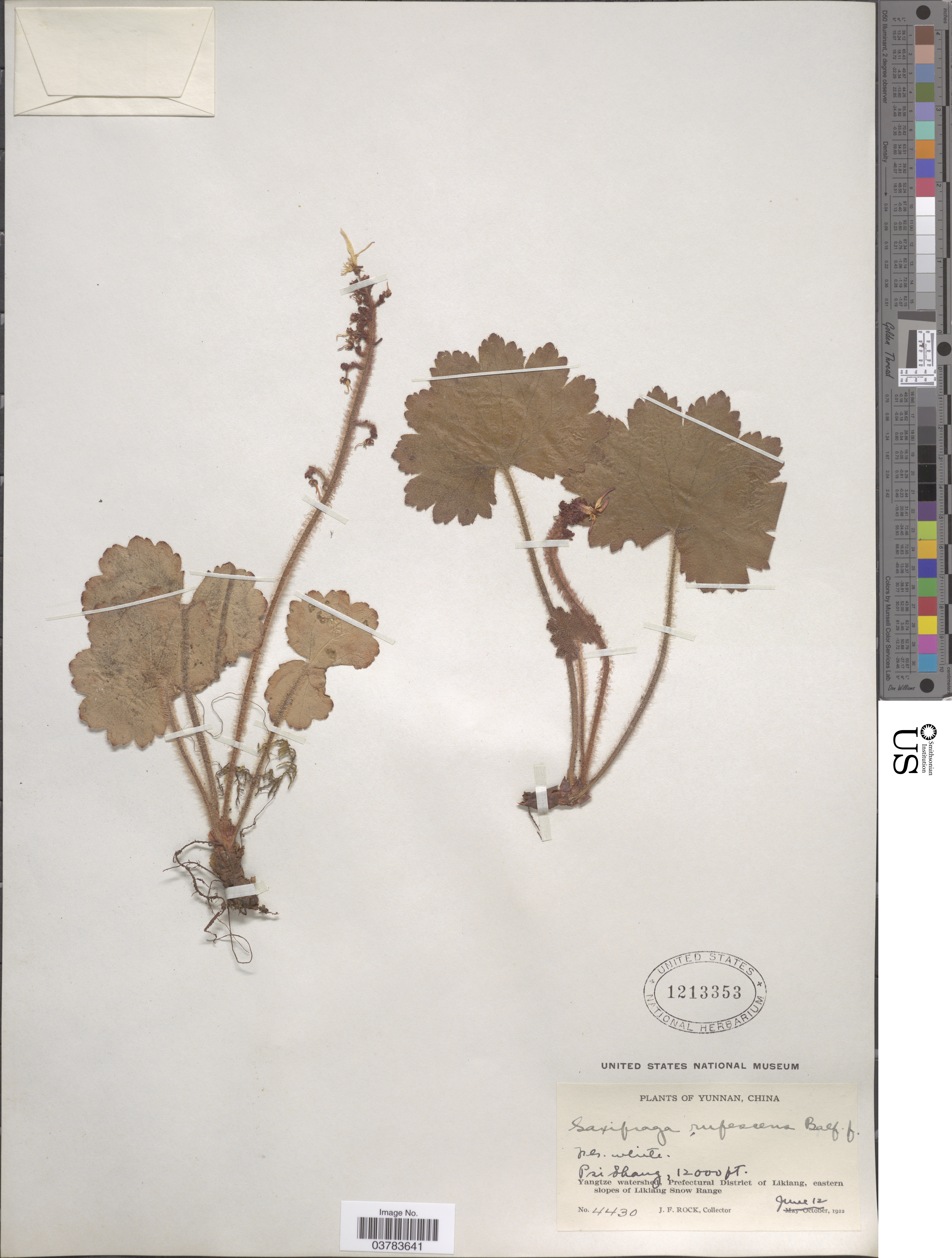
Saxifraga rufescens collected by Joseph Rock from Psi Shang, in the eastern slopes of Lijiang snow range

Between 1906 and 1910, Botanical collector George Forrest noticed S. rufescens in China and provided the specimens to Balfour. He had collected them from different parts of Yunnan. In the eastern part of the Tali range, it was found on moss-covered rocks and river banks in shady pine and mixed forests. In the eastern of the Lichiang range, it was found in similar rocky and shady places in pine and mixed forests. At the Mount Tahai, at the altitude of 2926m, it was found on rocks. The last specimens was provided by Édouard-Ernest Maire. In all these specimens, the plant ranged from 6-16 inches. The var. rufescens was later found to be spread from Tibet to South-Central China and further, to Myanmar.

In September 2024 a research team of Santanu Dey and Moaakum from Kohima Science College, and Hussain A. Barbhuiya from Bhabha Atomic Research Centre recorded the var. rufescens for the first time in Nagaland in Northeast India. Thereby, it expanded the known range of var. rufescens. It was found thriving in Noklak district's Khelia King mountain range at an elevation of 2265m above sea level. The plants were thriving on moss-covered rocks within the range's temperate broad-leaved evergreen forest. There were two distinct populations of 15-20 individual plants on surrounding mountain slopes. In Noklak, where var. rufescens was found the forest is dominated by Rhododendron arboreum, Quercus, and Lithocarpus pachyphyllus, along with Strobilanthes atropurpureus, Corydalis, Impatiens stenantha, Thalictrum reniforme, and Sedum.

The native range of var. flabellifolia is the northeast region of Sichuan and western region of Yunnan provinces. It is found in forests, wetlands on the sides of valleys and rock crevices at an altitude of 600m to 2100m.

The native range of var. uninervata is South-Central Sichuan in China. It is found around 2400m.
