= Saniculiphyllum =

Scientific classification
- Kingdom: Plantae
- Clade: Tracheophytes
- Clade: Angiosperms
- Clade: Eudicots
- Order: Saxifragales
- Family: Saxifragaceae
- Genus: Saniculiphyllum; C.Y.Wu & T.C.Ku (1992)
- Species: S. guangxiense

Binomial name
- Saniculiphyllum guangxiense C.Y.Wu & T.C.Ku (1992)

Genus of plants

Saniculiphyllum is a monotypic genus of flowering plants belonging to the family Saxifragaceae. The only species is Saniculiphyllum guangxiense.

Its native range is southeastern Yunnan and northwestern Guangxi provinces in southern China.
