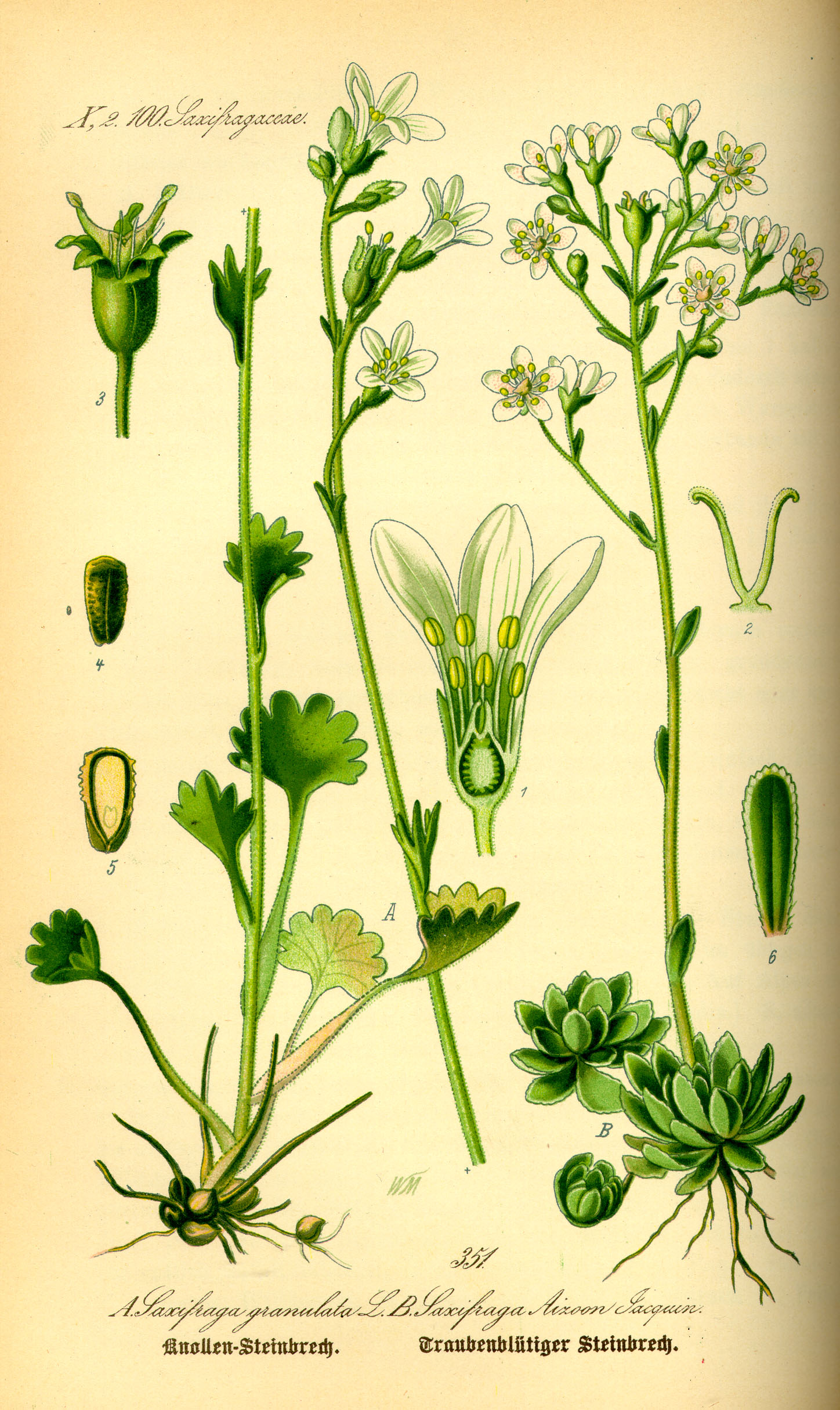
- Illustration of Saxifraga granulata

Scientific classification
- Kingdom: Plantae
- Clade: Tracheophytes
- Clade: Angiosperms
- Clade: Eudicots
- Order: Saxifragales
- Family: Saxifragaceae
- Genus: Saxifragodes; D.M.Moore (1969)
- Species: S. albowiana

Binomial name
- Saxifragodes albowiana (Kurtz) D.M.Moore (1969)

Synonyms
- Saxifraga albowiana Kurtz (1896); Saxifragella albowiana (Kurtz) Engl. (1919)

= Saxifragodes =

Genus of plants

Saxifragodes albowiana is a species of flowering plant belonging to the family Saxifragaceae. It is the sole species in the genus Saxifragodes. It is a perennial native to temperate-climate regions of southern Chile and southern Argentina.
