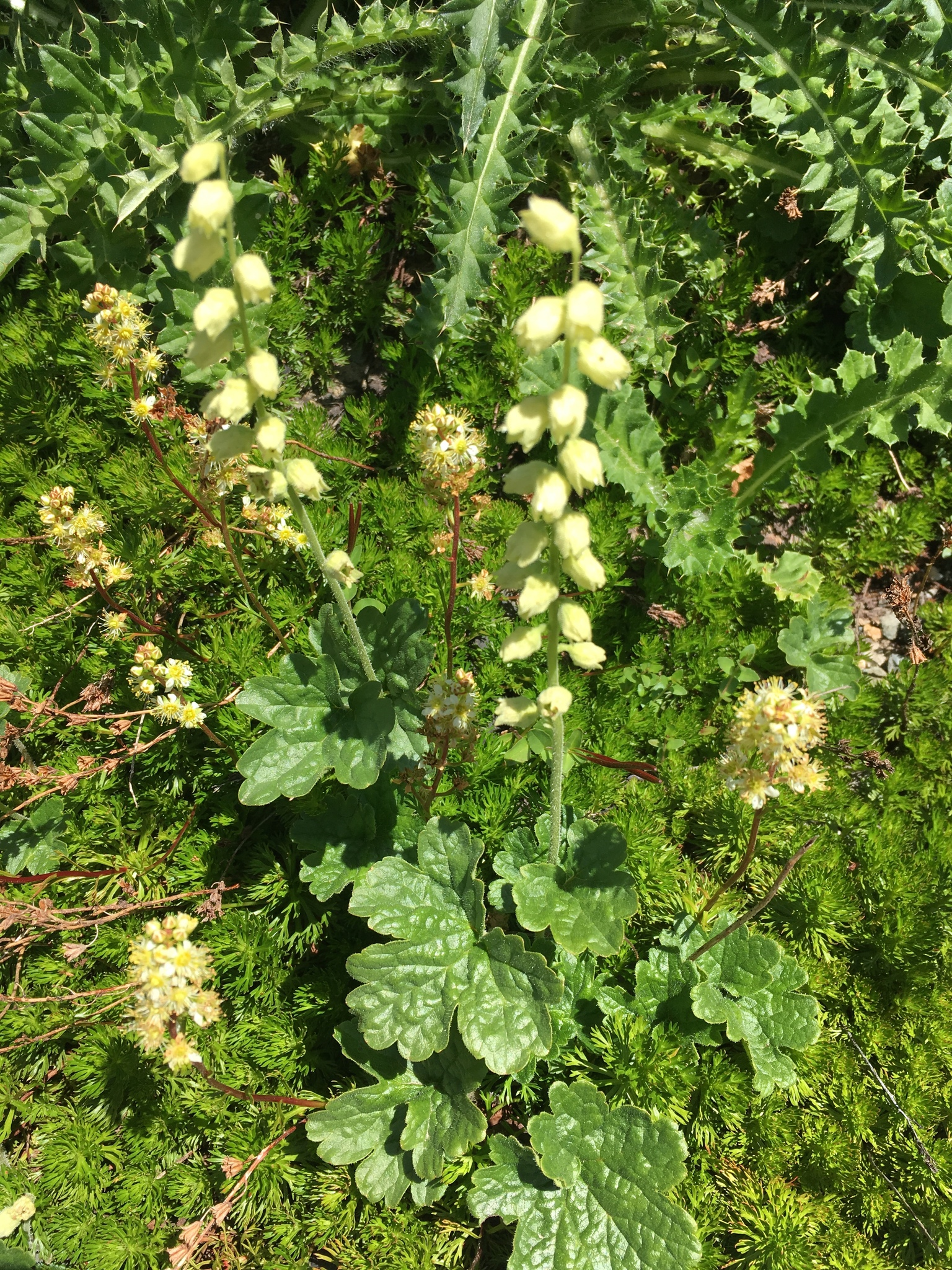
- Elmera racemosa

Scientific classification
- Kingdom: Plantae
- Clade: Tracheophytes
- Clade: Angiosperms
- Clade: Eudicots
- Order: Saxifragales
- Family: Saxifragaceae
- Genus: Elmera; Rydb. (1905)
- Species: E. racemosa

Binomial name
- Elmera racemosa (S.Watson) Rydb. (1905)

Synonyms
- Elmera racemosa var. puberulenta C.L.Hitchc. (1961); Heuchera racemosa S.Watson (1885)

= Elmera =

Genus of plants

Elmera racemosa is a species of flowering plant belonging to the family Saxifragaceae. It is the sole species in genus Elmera.

Its native range is from British Columbia in south-western Canada to Washington and Oregon in the northwestern United States.

The genus is named in honour of Adolph Daniel Edward Elmer (1870–1942), an American botanist and plant collector, it was first published and described in N.L.Britton & al. (eds.), N. Amer. Fl. Vol.22 on page 97 in 1905. The specific epithet of racemosa is derived from 'racemus' meaning cluster.

The species has 2 known synonyms; Elmera racemosa var. puberulenta C.L.Hitchc. and Heuchera racemosa S.Watson.
