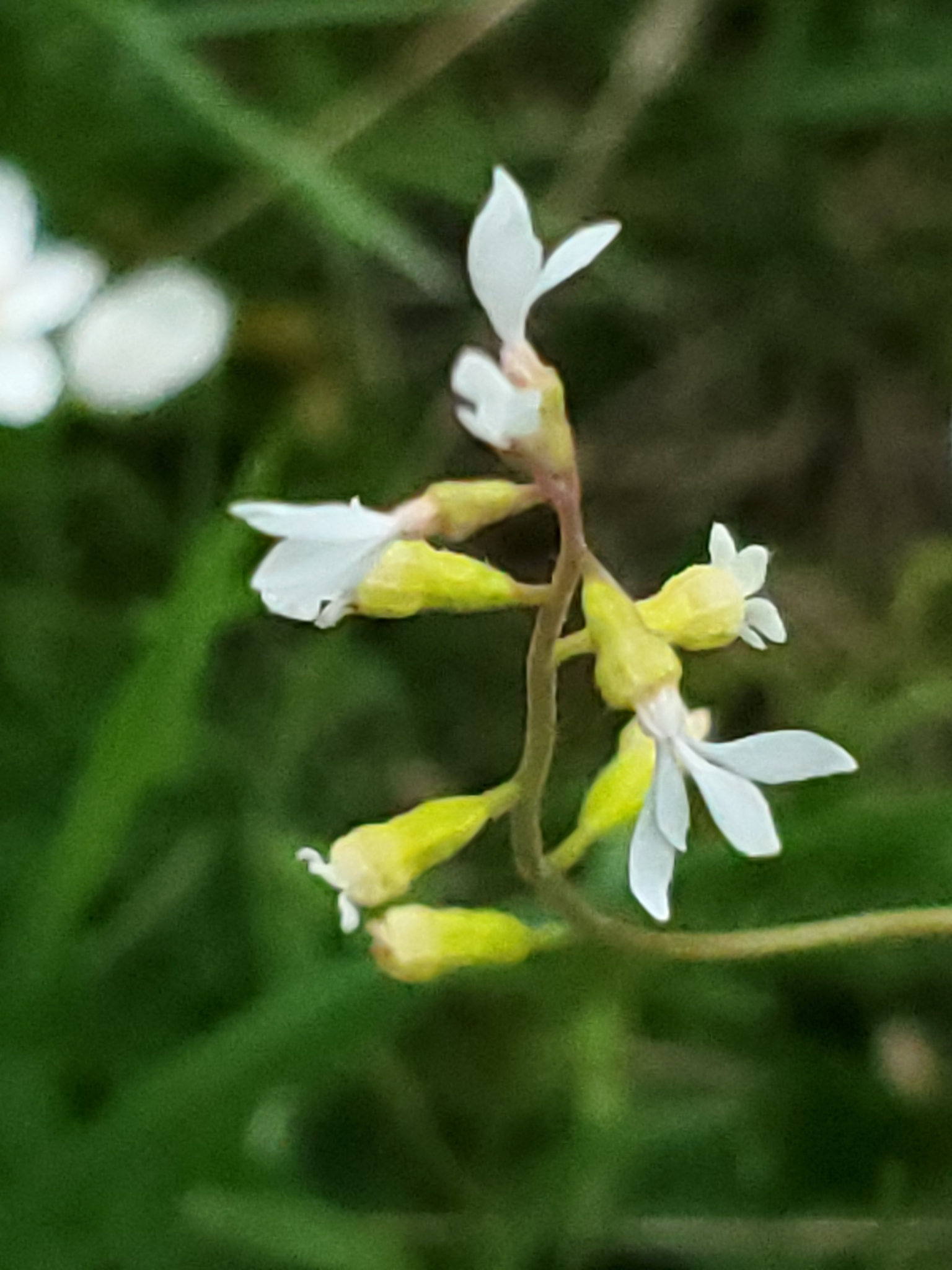

Scientific classification
- Kingdom: Plantae
- Clade: Tracheophytes
- Clade: Angiosperms
- Clade: Eudicots
- Order: Saxifragales
- Family: Saxifragaceae
- Genus: Conimitella; Rydb. (1905)
- Species: C. williamsii

Binomial name
- Conimitella williamsii (D.C.Eaton) Rydb. (1905)

Synonyms
- Heuchera williamsii D.C.Eaton (1890); Lithophragma williamsii Greene (1895); Tellima williamsii (D.C.Eaton) Canby (1891)

= Conimitella =

Genus of flowering plants

Conimitella williamsii is a species of flowering plant belonging to the family Saxifragaceae. It is the sole species in genus Conimitella. It is a perennial native to Alberta in west-central Canada and to Idaho, Montana, Wyoming, and Colorado in the northwestern United States.
