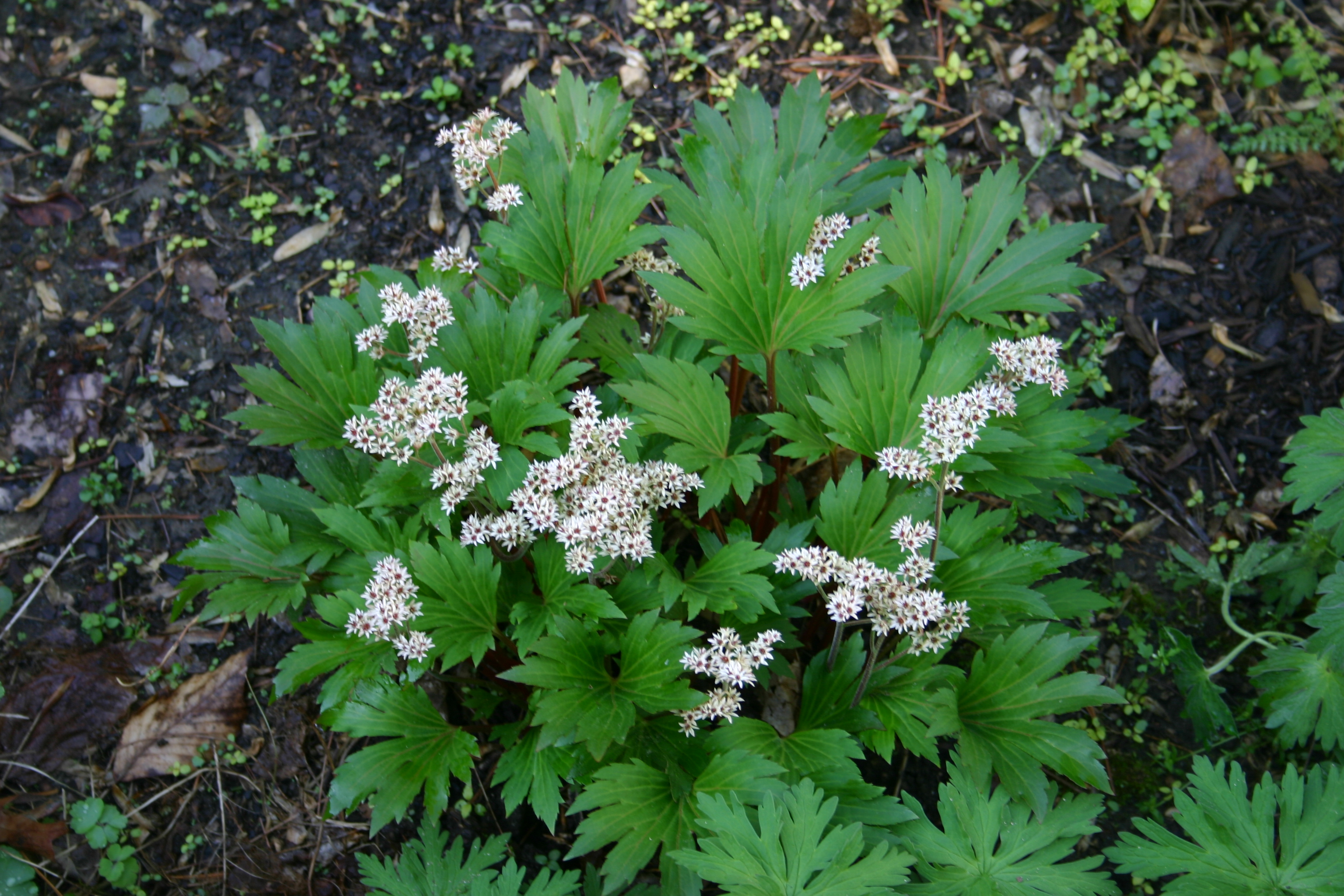
- Mukdenia rossii

Scientific classification
- Kingdom: Plantae
- Clade: Embryophytes
- Clade: Tracheophytes
- Clade: Spermatophytes
- Clade: Angiosperms
- Clade: Eudicots
- Order: Saxifragales
- Family: Saxifragaceae
- Genus: Mukdenia; Koidz. (1935)
- Species: M. rossii

Binomial name
- Mukdenia rossii (Oliv.) Koidz. (1935)

Synonyms
- Aceriphyllum Engl. (1890); Aceriphyllum rossii (Oliv.) Engl. (1891); Aceriphyllum rossii var. multilobum Nakai (1918); Mukdenia acanthifolia Nakai (1941); Mukdenia rossii var. multiloba (Nakai) Nakai (1952); Mukdenia rossii f. multiloba (Nakai) W.Lee (1996); Saxifraga rossii Oliv. (1878) (basionym)

= Mukdenia =

Genus of flowering plants

Mukdenia rossii is a species of flowering plant in the saxifrage family, Saxifragaceae. It is the sole species in genus Mukdenia. It is a perennial native to Korea and northeastern China.

== Description ==
Mukdenia rossii is a herbaceous plant with basal, palmate leaves, on short flowering stems. The flowers are white, borne in spring. Autumn foliage has fall colour.
