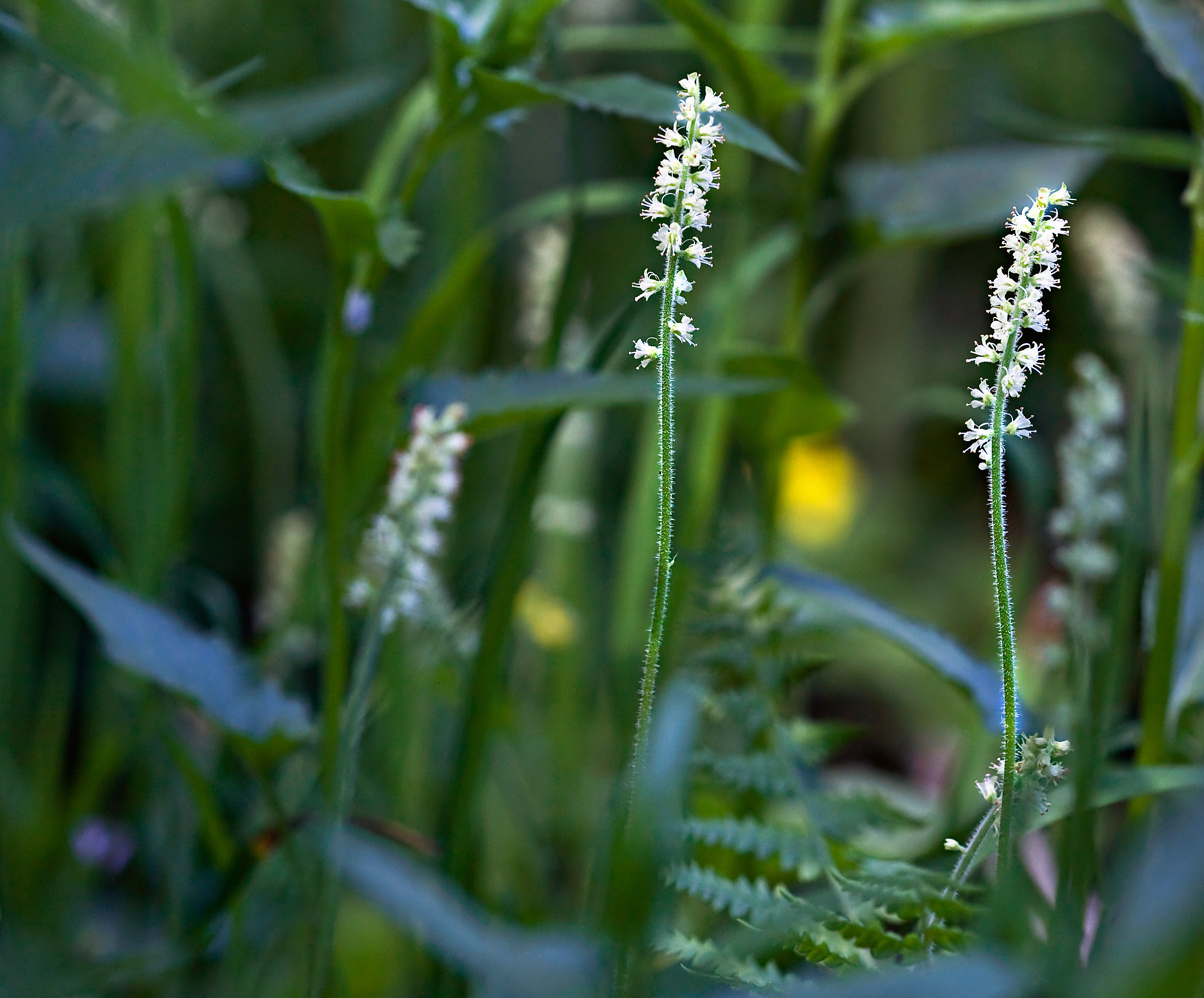

Scientific classification
- Kingdom: Plantae
- Clade: Embryophytes
- Clade: Tracheophytes
- Clade: Spermatophytes
- Clade: Angiosperms
- Clade: Eudicots
- Order: Saxifragales
- Family: Saxifragaceae
- Genus: Bensoniella; C.V.Morton (1965)
- Species: B. oregona

Binomial name
- Bensoniella oregona (Abrams & Bacig.) C.V.Morton (1965)

Synonyms
- Bensonia Abrams & Bacig. (1929), nom. illeg.; Bensonia oregona Abrams & Bacig. (1929)

= Bensoniella =

Monotypic genus of flowering plants

Bensoniella is a monotypic genus of plants in the saxifrage family containing the single species Bensoniella oregona (also, B. oregana), which is known by the common name Oregon bensoniella, or simply bensoniella. This plant is endemic to the Klamath Mountains of northern California and southern Oregon. This is a plant of the wet forest understory and meadows above 1,000 meters (3,300 ft) in elevation. It is a perennial herb which grows from a rhizome and bears rounded to heart-shaped lobed leaves with woolly petioles and tall, thin racemes of flowers. Each flower is white with bright yellow-pink anthers. The plant produces capsules of abundant seeds but also reproduces vegetatively. When it does reproduce sexually, it often self-pollinates. Bensoniella is not endangered but it is a species of some concern for several reasons, including lack of genetic diversity in part due to its habit of self-pollination and asexual reproduction, its relatively narrow tolerance of habitats, its small range of distribution, habitat destruction due to logging, grazing, and road-building, and erosion. The plant was first collected in 1916 by John Hunter Thompson.
