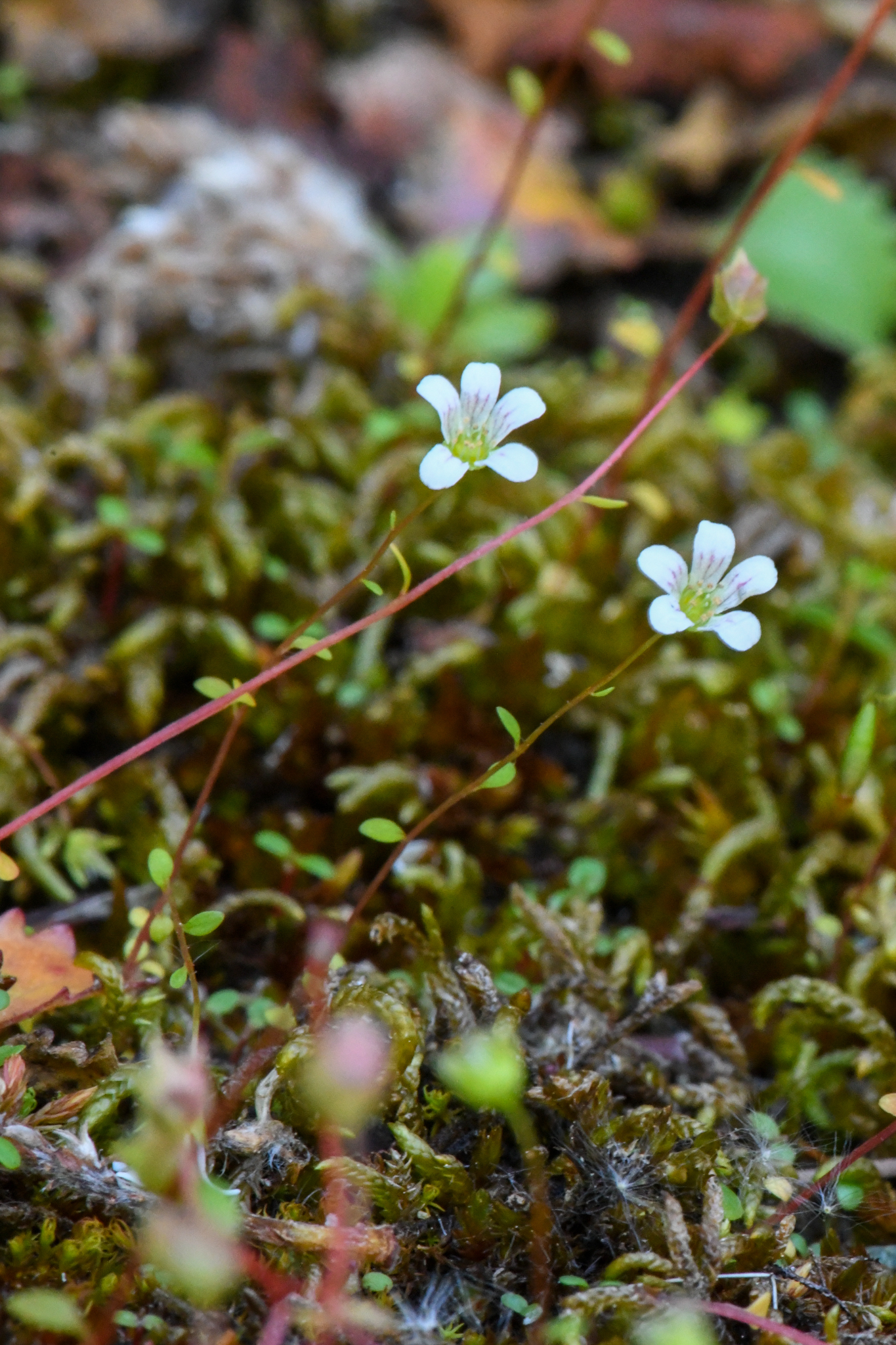

Scientific classification
- Kingdom: Plantae
- Clade: Tracheophytes
- Clade: Angiosperms
- Clade: Eudicots
- Order: Saxifragales
- Family: Saxifragaceae
- Genus: Cascadia; A.M.Johnson (1927)
- Species: C. nuttallii

Binomial name
- Cascadia nuttallii (Small) A.M.Johnson (1927)

Synonyms
- Saxifraga elegans Nutt. (1840), nom. illeg.; Saxifraga nuttallii Small (1896); Saxifraga nuttallii var. macrophylla Engl. & Irmsch. (1916); Saxifraga nuttallii var. typica Engl. & Irmsch. (1916)

= Cascadia nuttallii =

Species of flowering plant

Cascadia nuttallii is a species of flowering plant in the saxifrage family, Saxifragaceae. It is the sole species in genus Cascadia. It is an annual native to the western United States, ranging from southwestern Washington through Oregon to northwestern California.

It is a trailing herbaceous annual with stems 5 to 25 cm long. It grows from a rhizome.

It grows on wet shaded cliffs and ledges, generally above 700 meters elevation. In California it is limited to the Klamath Ranges, and its range extends northwards through the mountains of western Oregon to southwestern Washington.
