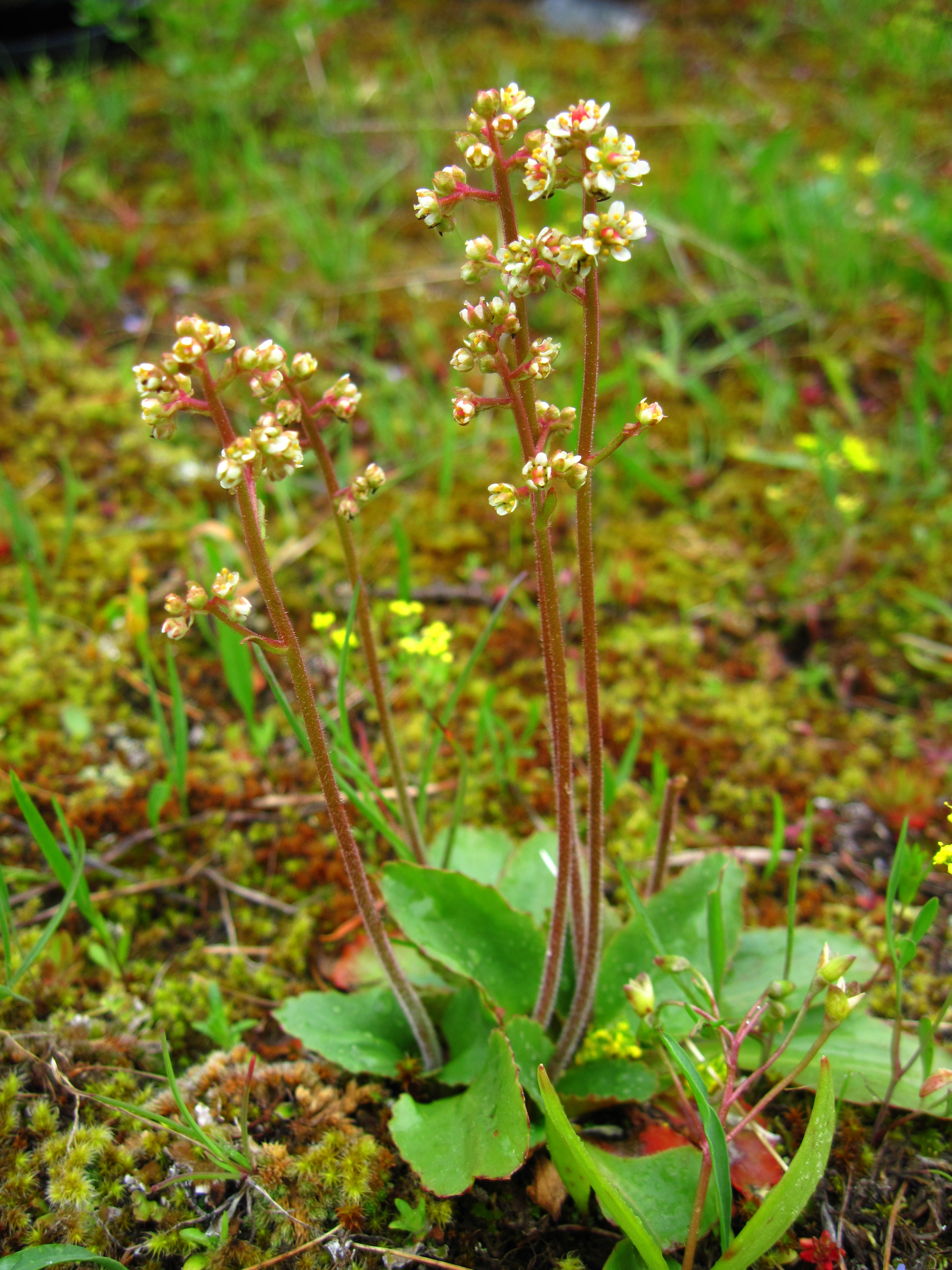
- Leptarrhena pyrolifolia

Scientific classification
- Kingdom: Plantae
- Clade: Tracheophytes
- Clade: Angiosperms
- Clade: Eudicots
- Order: Saxifragales
- Family: Saxifragaceae
- Genus: Leptarrhena; R.Br. (1820)
- Species: L. pyrolifolia

Binomial name
- Leptarrhena pyrolifolia (D.Don) Ser. (1830)

Synonyms
- Saxifraga coriacea Fisch. ex Ser. (1830), not validly publ.; Saxifraga micrantha Fisch. ex Ser. (1830), not validly publ.; Saxifraga parviflora Fisch. ex Cham. (1831), not validly publ.; Saxifraga pyrolifolia D.Don (1822) (basionym); Saxifraga secunda Willd. ex Cham. (1827), not validly publ.

= Leptarrhena =

Genus of plants

Leptarrhena pyrolifolia is a species of flowering plants belonging to the family Saxifragaceae. It is the sole species in genus Leptarrhena.

It is a perennial or rhizomataceous geophyte native to northwestern North America, from subarctic Alaska and the Northwest Territories to the northwestern United States.
