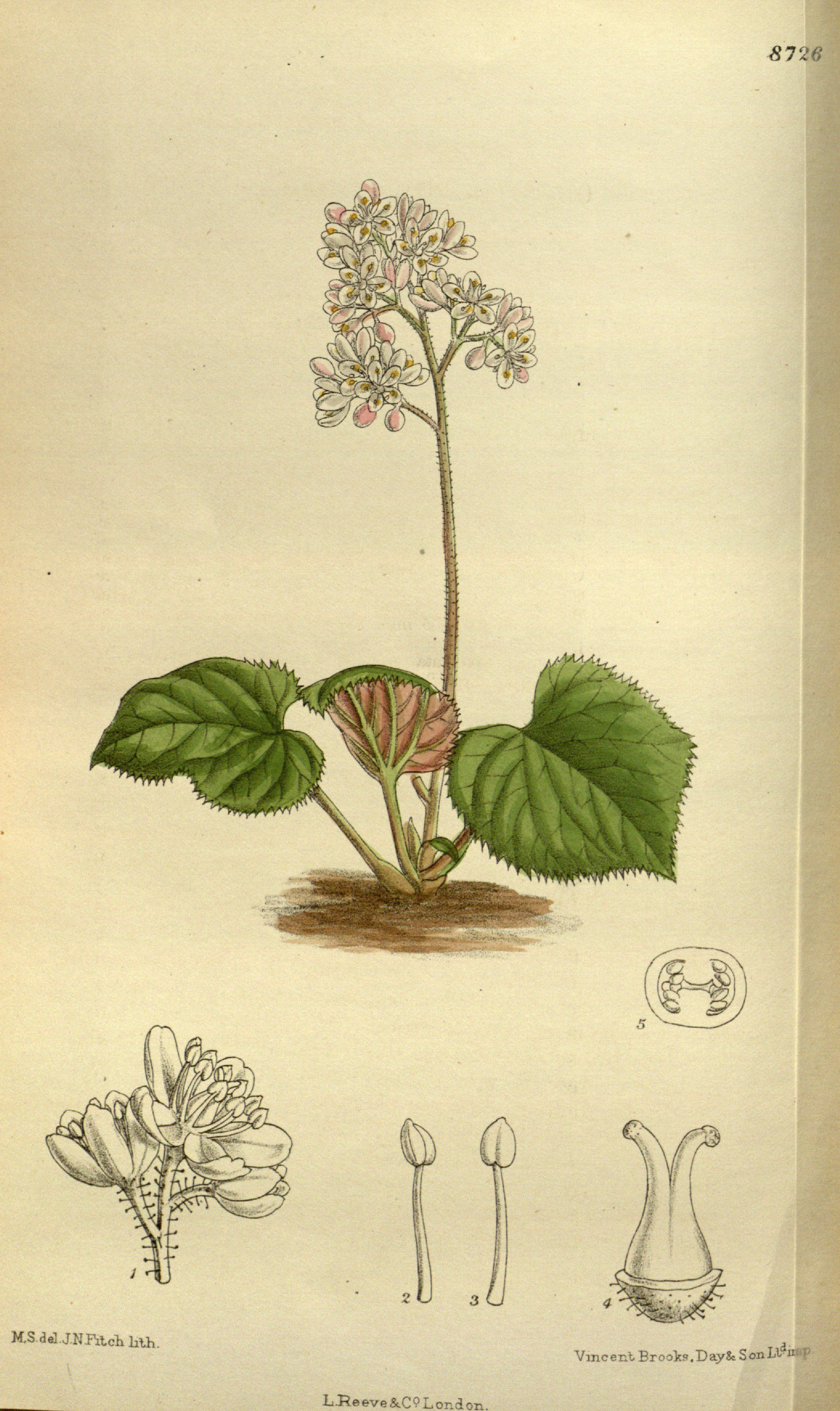
- Oresitrophe rupifraga

Scientific classification
- Kingdom: Plantae
- Clade: Tracheophytes
- Clade: Angiosperms
- Clade: Eudicots
- Order: Saxifragales
- Family: Saxifragaceae
- Genus: Oresitrophe; Bunge (1835)
- Species: O. rupifraga

Binomial name
- Oresitrophe rupifraga Bunge (1835)

Synonyms
- Begonia gemmirhiza H.Lév. (1911); Oresitrophe rupifraga var. glabrescens W.T.Wang (1981)

= Oresitrophe =

Genus of plants

Oresitrophe rupifraga is a species of flowering plant belonging to the family Saxifragaceae. It is the sole species in genus Oresitrophe. It is a perennial native to northern China, ranging from eastern Shanxi Province to western Liaoning Province.
