= Tanakaea =

Scientific classification
- Kingdom: Plantae
- Clade: Tracheophytes
- Clade: Angiosperms
- Clade: Eudicots
- Order: Saxifragales
- Family: Saxifragaceae
- Genus: Tanakaea; Franch. & Sav. (1873)
- Species: T. radicans

Binomial name
- Tanakaea radicans Franch. & Sav. (1873)

Synonyms
- Tanakaea omeiensis Nakai (1938); Tanakaea omeiensis var. nanchuanensis W.T.Wang (1989)

Genus of flowering plants

Tanakaea radicans, the Japanese foam flower, is a species of flowering plant in the Saxifrage family, and is the sole species in the genus Tanakaea. It is native to central Honshu and Shikoku in Japan, and to southern Sichuan in south-central China. It is named after the Japanese botanist Tanaka Yoshio. It was initially described by Ludovic Savatier and Adrien René Franchet.

Tanakaea radicans propagates via rhizomes similar to the runners of a strawberry. Its preferred habitat in the wild is shady, damp rocky soil.
