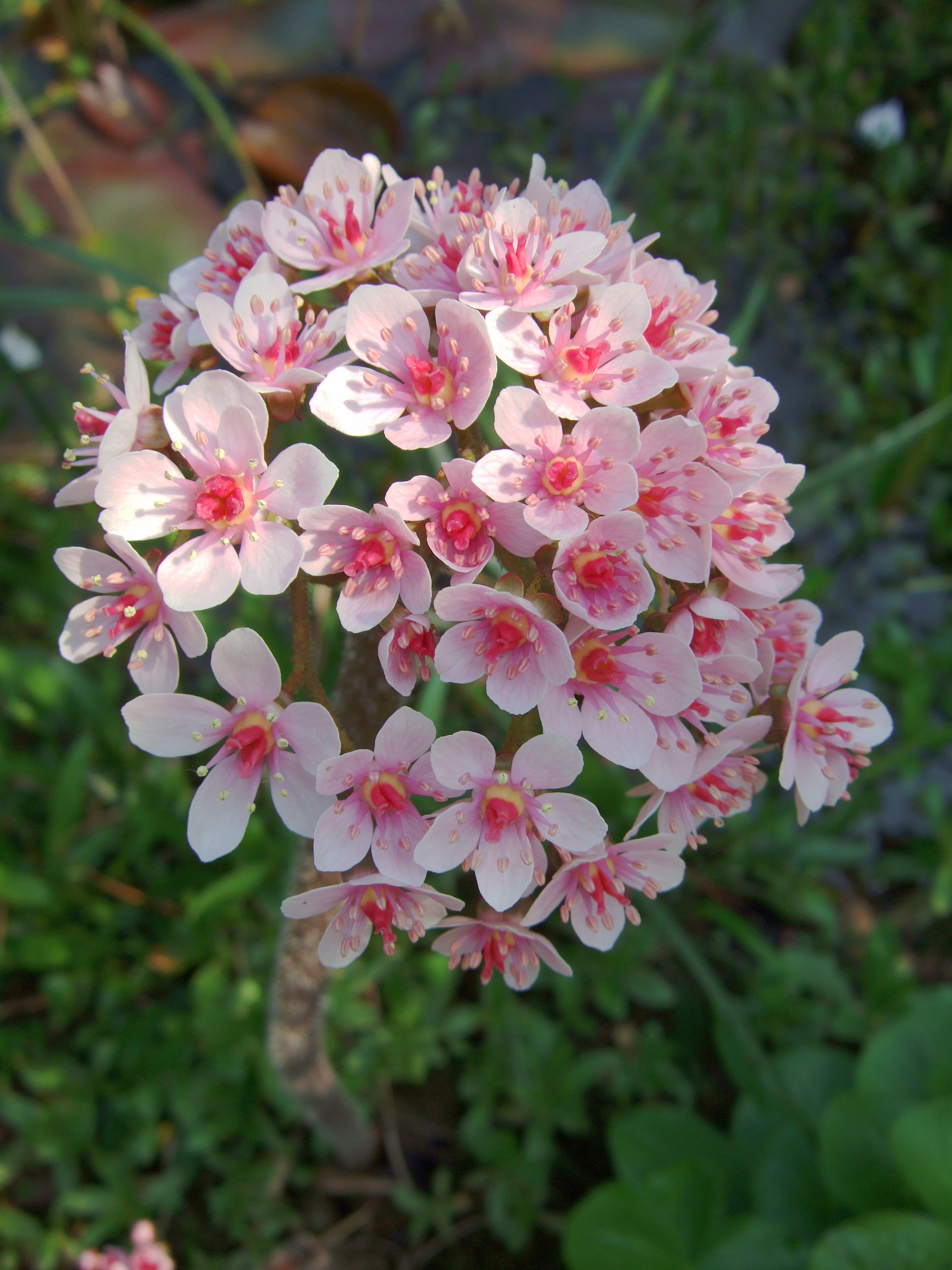
- Flowers

Conservation status
- Apparently Secure (NatureServe)

Scientific classification
- Kingdom: Plantae
- Clade: Tracheophytes
- Clade: Angiosperms
- Clade: Eudicots
- Order: Saxifragales
- Family: Saxifragaceae
- Genus: Darmera; Voss (1899)
- Species: D. peltata

Binomial name
- Darmera peltata (Torr. ex Benth.) Voss (1899)

Synonyms
- Leptarrhena inundata Behr ex Kellogg (1855); Peltiphyllum peltatum (Torr. ex Benth.) Engl. (1891); Saxifraga peltata Torr. ex Benth. (1849) (basionym)

= Darmera =

Darmera peltata

Species of flowering plant

Darmera peltata, the Indian rhubarb or umbrella plant, is a flowering plant, the only species within the genus Darmera in the family Saxifragaceae. It is a slowly spreading rhizomatous perennial native to mountain streamsides in woodland in the western United States (western Oregon to northwestern California), growing to 2 m (6 ft 7 in) tall by 1 m (3 ft 3 in) wide. The name Darmera honors Karl Darmer, a 19th-century German horticulturist.

In late spring the flowers emerge before the leaves, with rounded cymes of numerous five-petalled white to bright pink flowers (measuring up to 1.5 cm (0.59 in) across each) borne on flower stems up to 2 m (6 ft 7 in) long. The leaves, up to 60 cm (24 in) long and wide, are peltate, rounded, deeply lobed, coarsely toothed, conspicuously veined and dark green, also on stems petioles up to 2 m (6 ft 7 in) height. The leaves turn red in autumn.

In gardens, Darmera peltata flourishes in pond margins and bog gardens, where it forms an imposing umbrella-like clump. It is suited to smaller gardens where there is no room for Gunnera manicata or Gunnera tinctoria, distantly related plants that are somewhat similar in appearance, but much larger.

Darmera peltata has gained the Royal Horticultural Society's Award of Garden Merit; it has also become locally naturalized in Britain and Ireland.

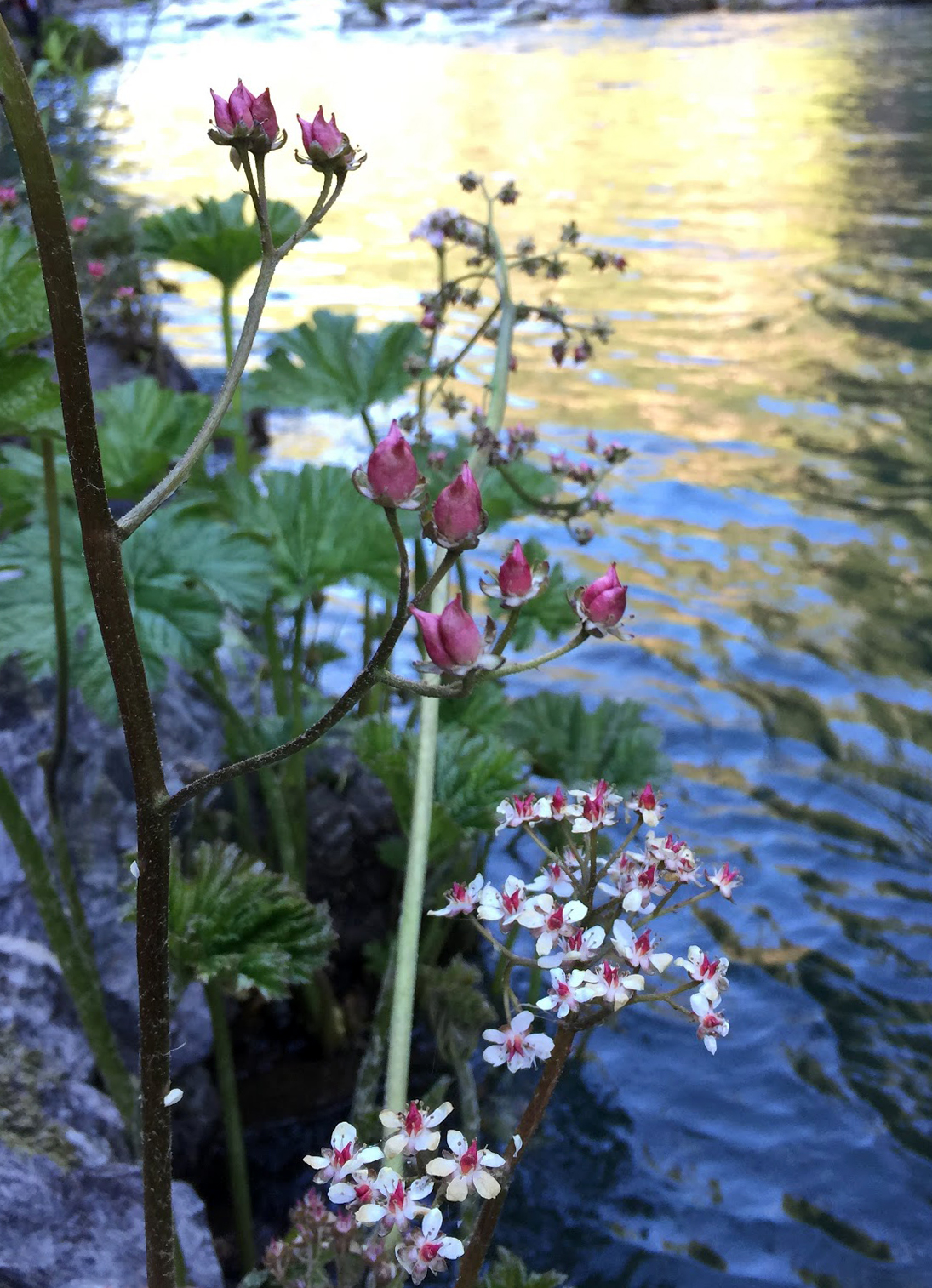
McCloud River, California

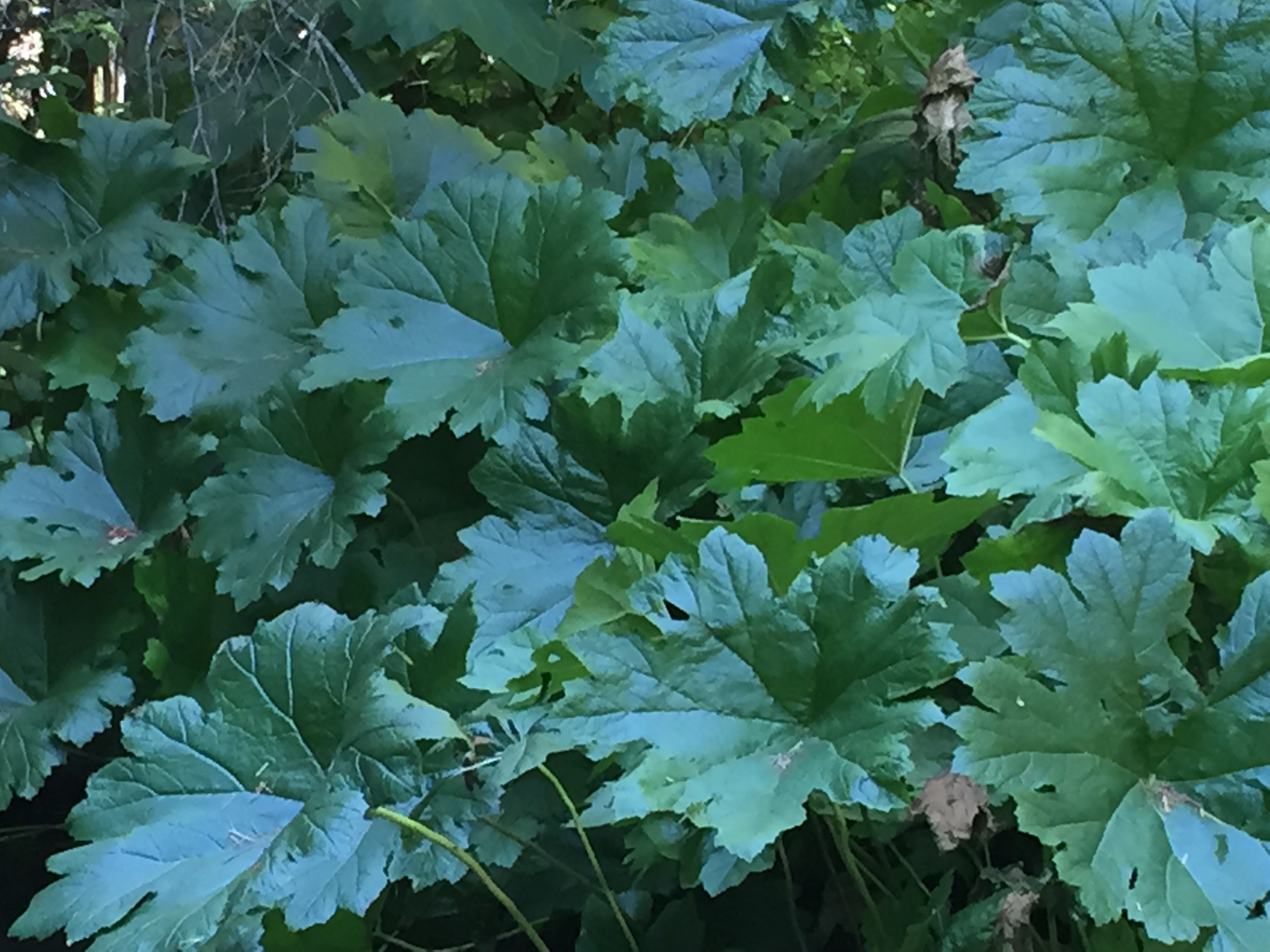
El Dorado National Forest, California
