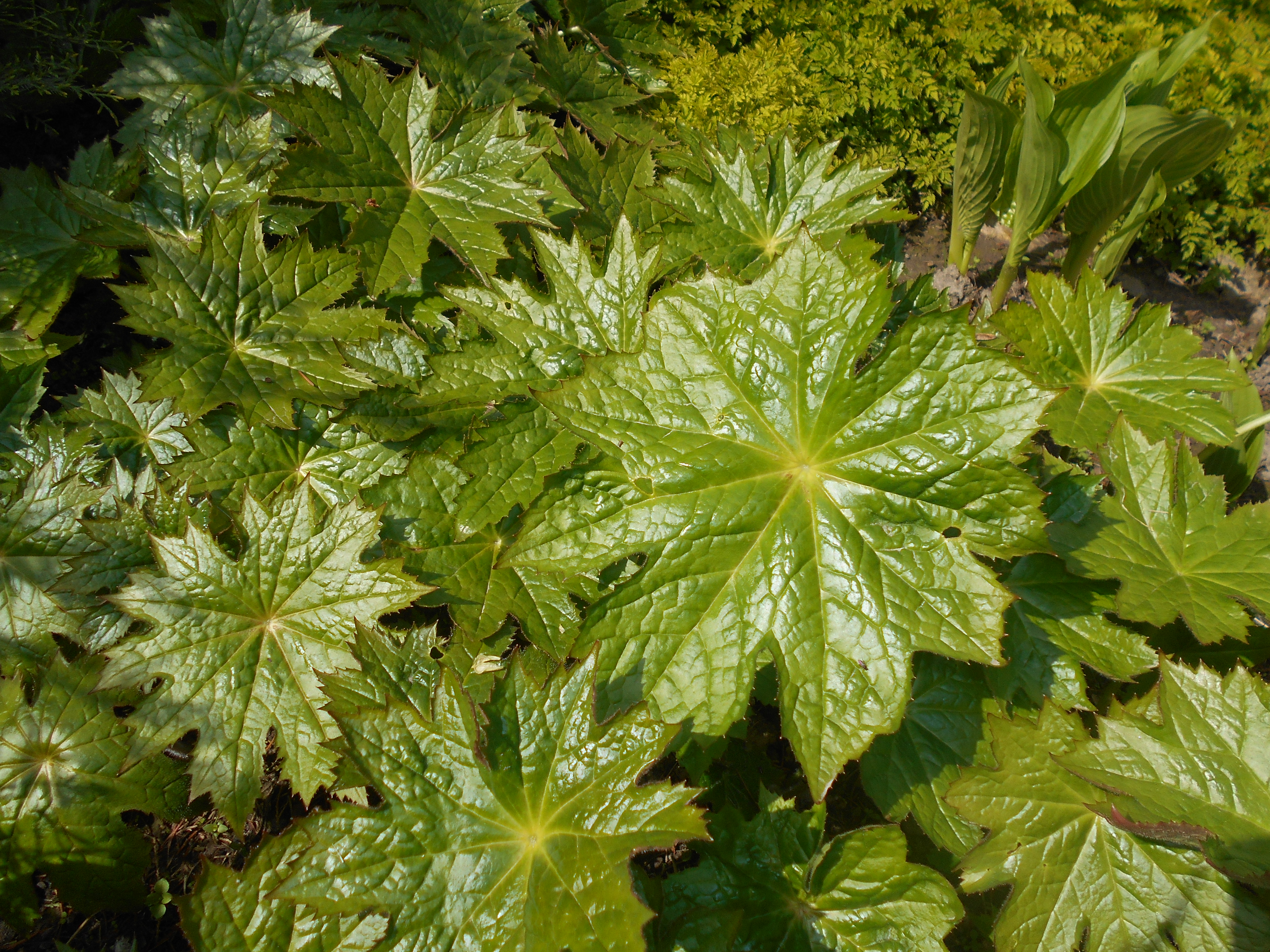
- Peltoboykinia tellimoides

Scientific classification
- Kingdom: Plantae
- Clade: Tracheophytes
- Clade: Angiosperms
- Clade: Eudicots
- Order: Saxifragales
- Family: Saxifragaceae
- Genus: Peltoboykinia (Engl.) Hara (1937)

= Peltoboykinia =

Genus of plants

Peltoboykinia is a genus of flowering plants belonging to the family Saxifragaceae.

Its native range is southeastern China and Japan.

== Species ==
Species:

- Peltoboykinia tellimoides (Maxim.) H.Hara – China (northern Fujian) and Japan (northern and Central Honshu)
- Peltoboykinia watanabei (Yatabe) H.Hara – Japan (Shikoku and Kyushu)
