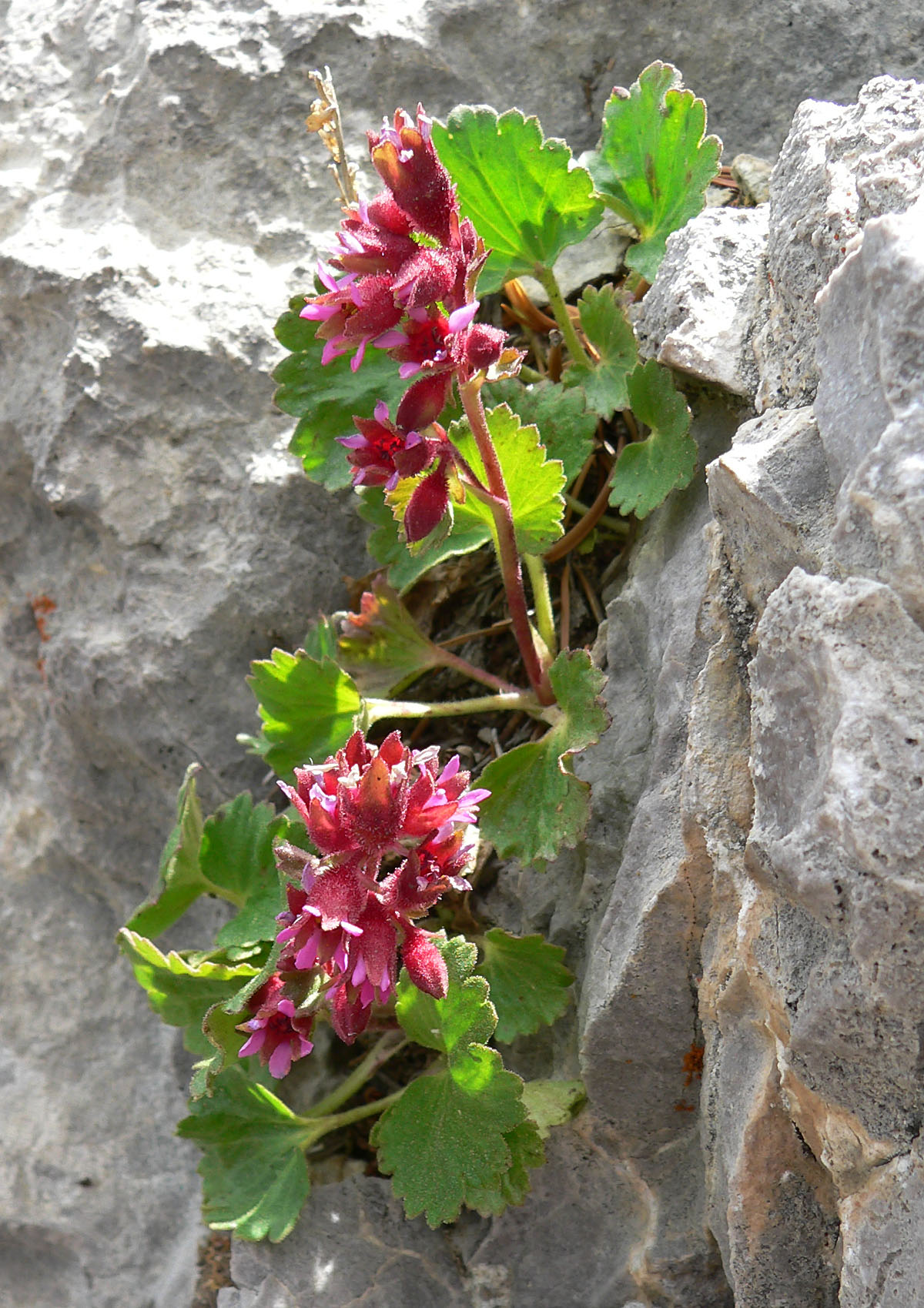
- Telesonix heucheriformis

Scientific classification
- Kingdom: Plantae
- Clade: Tracheophytes
- Clade: Angiosperms
- Clade: Eudicots
- Order: Saxifragales
- Family: Saxifragaceae
- Genus: Telesonix; Raf. (1837)

= Telesonix =

Genus of flowering plants

Telesonix is a genus of flowering plants belonging to the family Saxifragaceae. Its name derives from the Greek teleos, complete or perfect, and onyx, claw, in reference to the shape of its petals.

Its native range is Alberta in west-central Canada to Colorado, Montana, Nevada, New Mexico, Utah, and Wyoming in the west-central United States.

Species:

- Telesonix heucheriformis (Rydb.) Rydb.
- Telesonix jamesii (Torr.) Raf.
