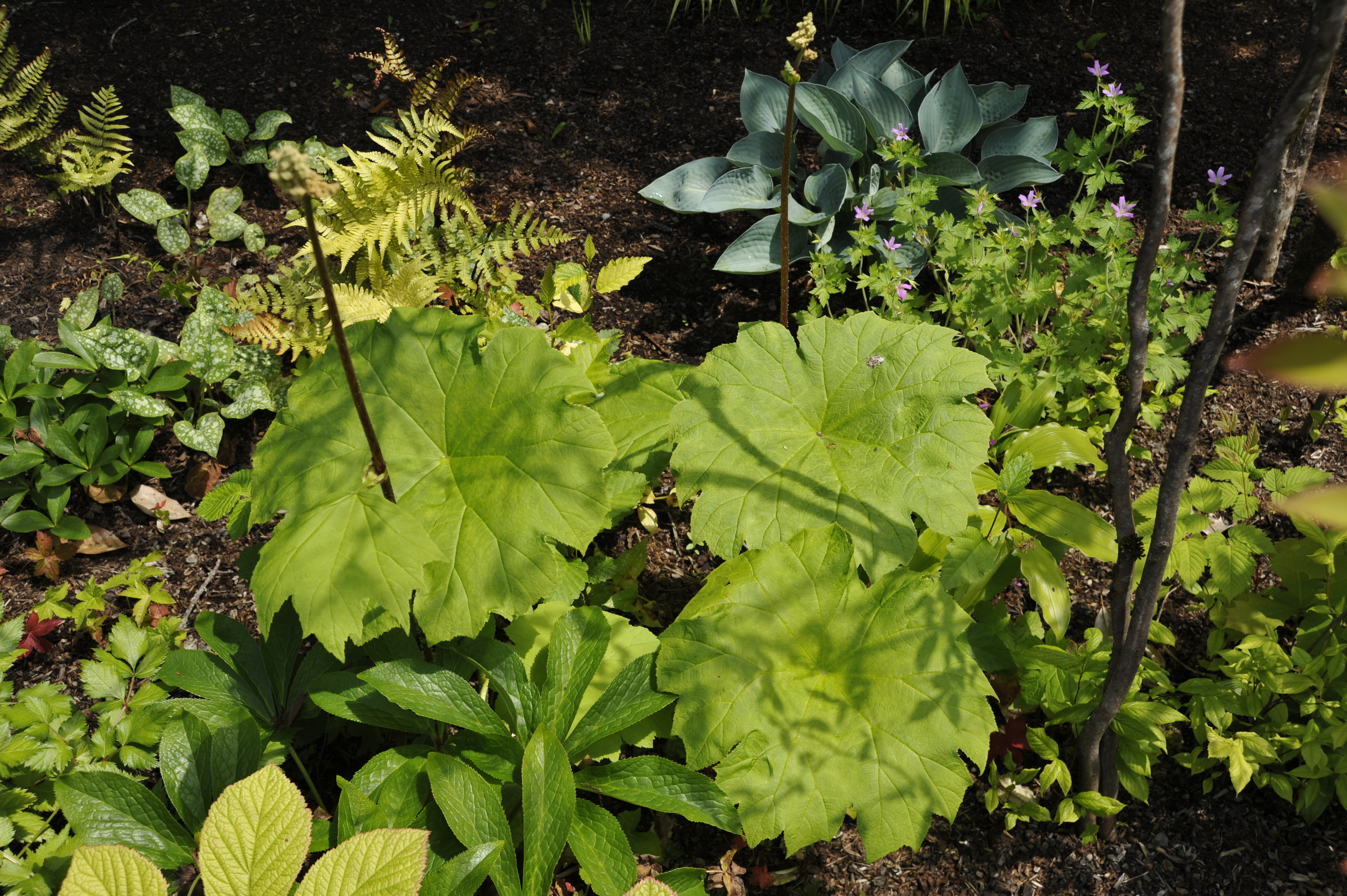
- Astilboides tabularis

Scientific classification
- Kingdom: Plantae
- Clade: Tracheophytes
- Clade: Angiosperms
- Clade: Eudicots
- Order: Saxifragales
- Family: Saxifragaceae
- Genus: Astilboides; Engl. (1919)
- Species: A. tabularis

Binomial name
- Astilboides tabularis (Hemsl.) Engl. (1919)

Synonyms
- Rodgersia tabularis (Hemsl.) Kom. (1904); Saxifraga tabularis Hemsl. (1887)

= Astilboides =

Monotypic genus of flowering plants

Astilboides, a genus of the saxifrage family containing only one species, Astilboides tabularis, a herbaceous perennial once included in the genus Rodgersia. It is native to northeastern China and Korea. It differs from its former relatives mainly in its leaf shape. It is grown for its huge bright green, circular leaves to 36 in (90 cm) across with the stem attached to the center, and large fluffy racemes of tiny white flowers produced in summer.

The Latin specific epithet tabularis means "tabular" or "flat", referring to the leaf formation.

== Cultivation ==
Grown best in moist soils in a cool sheltered spot. It is usually seen at its best near water. It bears very little resemblance to the genus Astilbe after which it was named. Propagate from seed or divisions when dormant.
