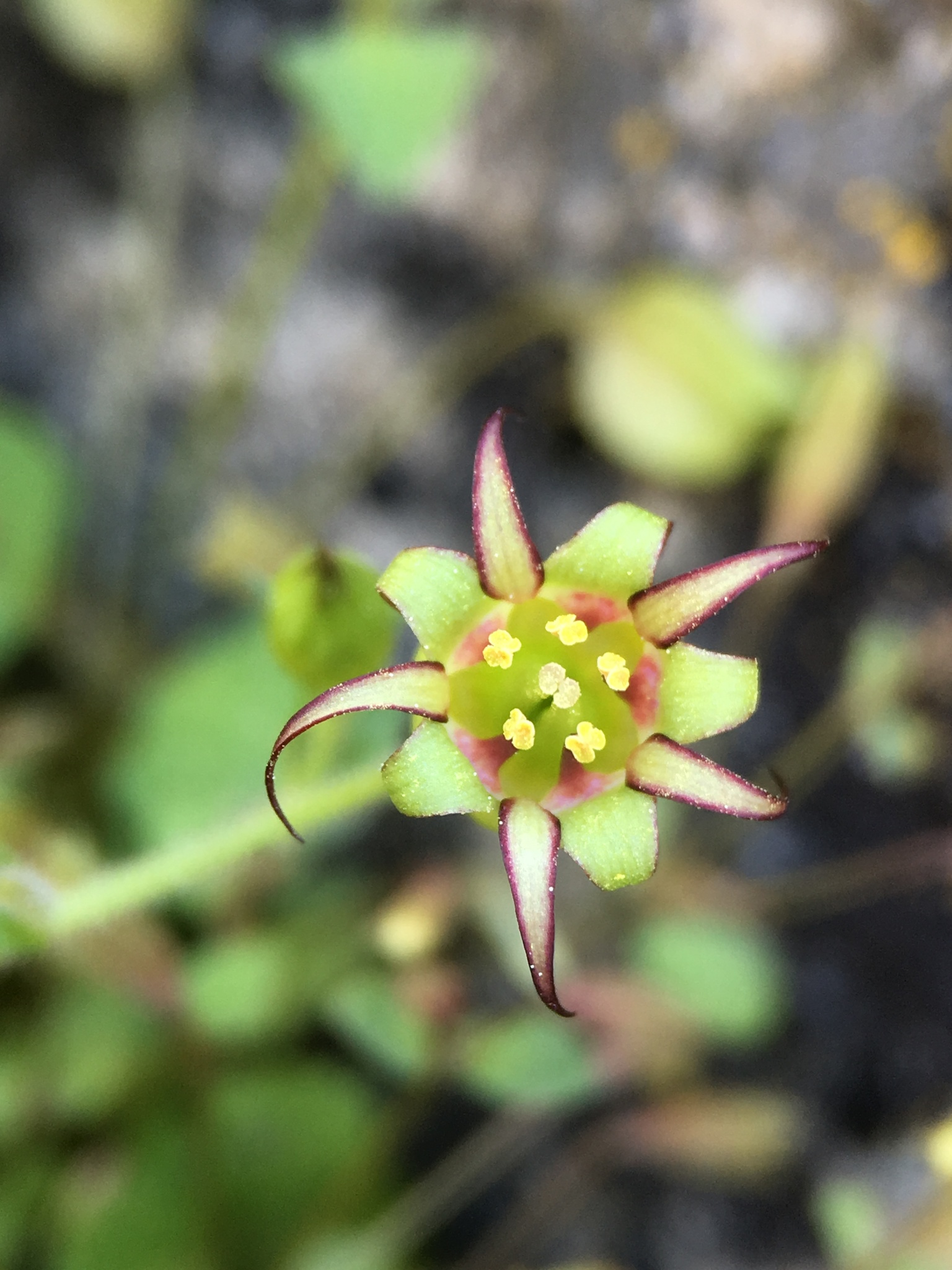
- Bolandra californica

Scientific classification
- Kingdom: Plantae
- Clade: Embryophytes
- Clade: Tracheophytes
- Clade: Spermatophytes
- Clade: Angiosperms
- Clade: Eudicots
- Order: Saxifragales
- Family: Saxifragaceae
- Genus: Bolandra; A.Gray

Species
- 2: See text

= Bolandra =

Genus of flowering plants

Bolandra is a small genus of plants related to the saxifrages. It contains two species known as false coolworts. These are perennials with toothed leaves and inflorescences of curling, sharp-petalled flowers. They are both native to western North America.

Species:

- Bolandra californica – Sierra false coolwort
- Bolandra oregana – northern false coolwort
