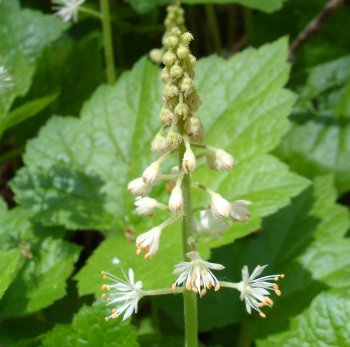
- Tiarella (Foamflower)

Scientific classification
- Kingdom: Plantae
- Clade: Embryophytes
- Clade: Tracheophytes
- Clade: Angiosperms
- Clade: Eudicots
- Order: Saxifragales
- Family: Saxifragaceae; Juss.

Type genus
- Saxifraga L.

Clades
- See text
- The range of Saxifragaceae

= Saxifragaceae =

Family of flowering plants

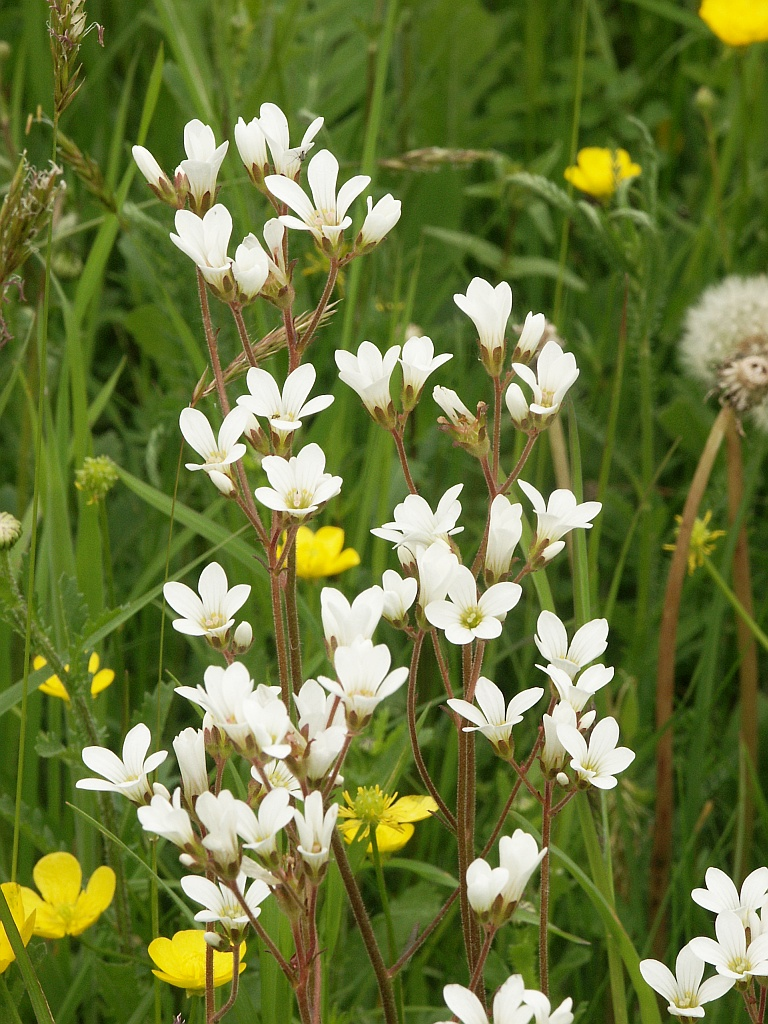
Saxifraga granulata

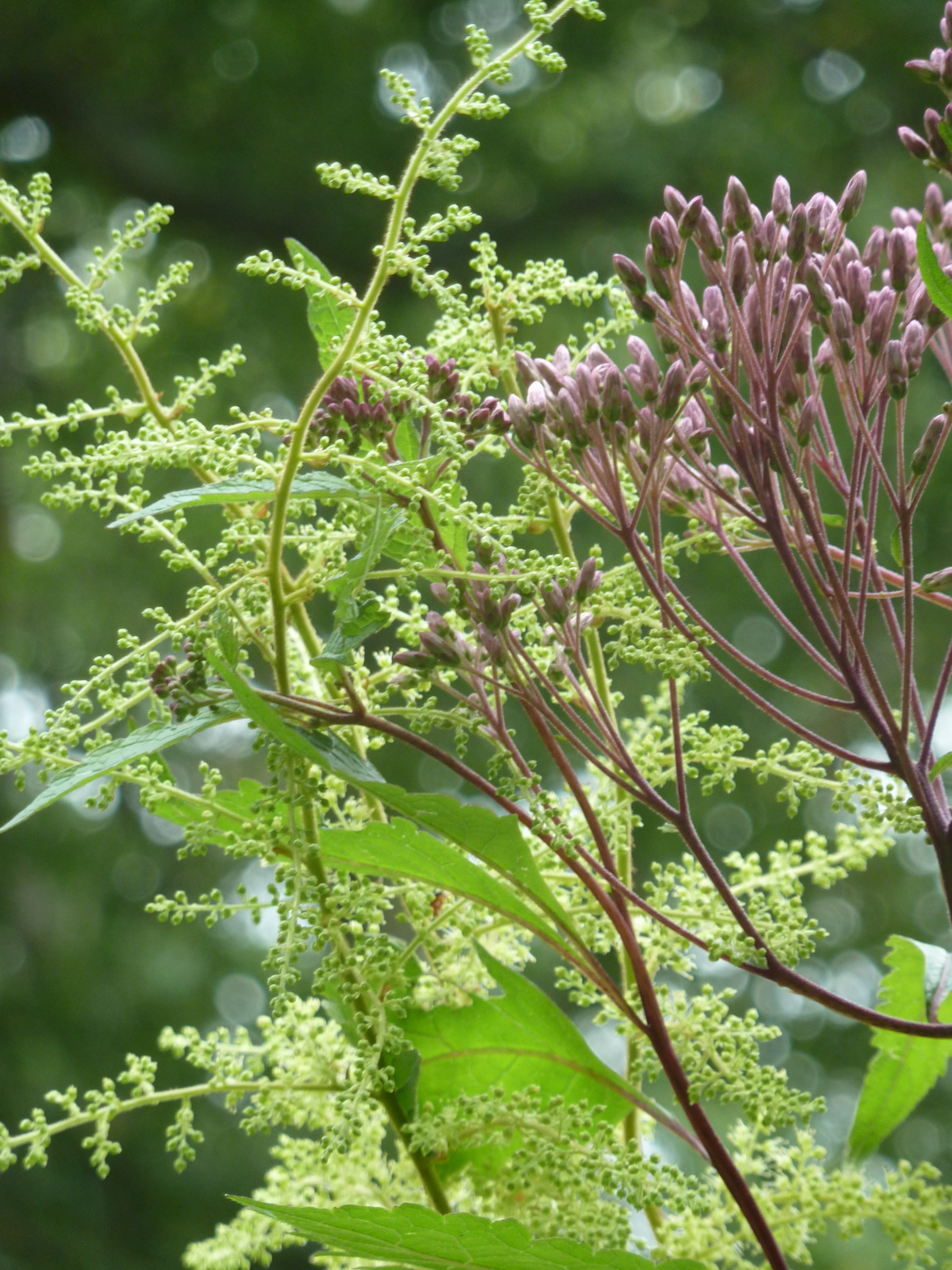
Astilbe rivularis

Saxifragaceae is a family of herbaceous perennial flowering plants, within the core eudicot order Saxifragales. The taxonomy of the family has been greatly revised and the scope much reduced in the era of molecular phylogenetic analysis. The family is divided into ten clades, with about 640 known species in about 35 accepted genera. About half of these consist of a single species, but about 400 of the species are in the type genus Saxifraga. The family is predominantly distributed in the northern hemisphere, but also in the Andes in South America.

== Description ==
Species are herbaceous perennials (rarely annual or biennial), sometimes succulent or xerophytic, often with perennating rhizomes. The leaves are usually basally aggregated in alternate rosettes, sometimes on inflorescence stems. They are usually simple, rarely pinnately or palmately compound. Their margins may be entire, deeply lobed, cleft, crenate or dentate and petiolate with stipules.

The inflorescences are bracteate racemes or cymes. The flowers are hermaphroditic (bisexual), rarely unisexual (androdioecious), actinomorphic (rarely zygomorphic). The perianth is placed on a hypanthium that may be free or may be partly fused with the ovary (which is then semi-inferior). There are usually five sepals, but there may be three to ten, fused with the hypanthium, occasionally petaloid. The petals are clawed, sometimes cleft at the tip or finely dissected. Flowers have five to ten stamens, free and opposite the petals, with the anthers usually basifixed and opening by lengthwise slits. The ovary is inferior to semi-inferior with two (sometimes three) carpels usually fused at the base, sometimes free, each topped with stylodium and capitate stigma. The ovules are few to many, with axile or parietal placentation and two to three styles. The fruit is usually a septicidal capsule or follicle, with numerous small seeds.

== Taxonomy ==
Saxifragaceae has long been considered in a pivotal position in the evolution of angiosperm lineage, located in an ancestral "Saxifragalean stock". Historically the Saxifragaceae have included many very morphologically disparate taxa in systems based on morphology alone, and has been very difficult to classify and characterize phenotypically. Consequently many different classifications have been published, differing considerably in both the relationship of the family to other angiosperms, and its internal structure, for instance the systems of Cronquist (1981), Dahlgren (1983), Engler (1890), Hutchinson (1973), Schulze-Menz (1964), Takhtajan (1980) and Thorne (1992) (for a history, see Morgan & Soltis (1993). In its broadest circumscription, it included 17 subfamilies. This construction is referred to as Saxifragaceae sensu lato (s.l.). Within those subfamilies, the large majority of genera (30) were located within subfamily Saxifragoideae, the core group, with all but two of the remainder only having 1-3 genera.

The circumscription of the family has changed considerably in recent years, in large part due to molecular phylogenetic work showing the family s.l. to be polyphyletic, and probably represents the most extreme example, with at least 10 evolutionary lines. Consequently the circumscription has been considerably reduced, with many of the subfamilies being either elevated to separate families, or placed as components of other families, often quite distant. For instance subfamily Parnassioideae was raised to the level of family Parnassiaceae, and eventually a subfamily of Celastraceae (order Celastrales). Similarly the Hydrangoideae is now the family Hydrangeaceae (order Cornales).

The reduced Saxifragaceae is distinguished by being referred to as Saxifragaceae sensu stricto (s.s.), corresponding to the Saxifragoideae a natural monophyletic group. Historically, the Saxifragaceae has been placed in either the orders Rosales or Saxifragales. This reduced Saxifragaceae, corresponding to subfamily Saxifragoideae and its 30 genera, is now placed within the Saxifragales. There, with three other subfamilies (Ribesoideaee, Iteoideae and Pterostemonoideae) it forms the Saxifragaceae alliance, while Penthoroideae and Tetracarpaeoideae are closely related within the core Saxifragales as shown in the cladogram. The remaining subfamilies are all transferred to more distant orders within the rosid and asterid clades.

Cladogram I: Saxifragales families

- Saxifragales
  - Peridiscaceae (4)
  - 97
    - - Paeonia (Paeoniaceae)
      - woody clade
        - Liquidambar (Altingiaceae)
        - 69
          - 98
            Hamamelidaceae (27)
          - 95
            - Cercidiphyllum (Cercidiphyllaceae)
            - Daphniphyllum (Daphniphyllaceae)
    - core Saxifragales
      - - Crassulaceae (34)
        - Haloragaceaes.l.
          - Aphanopetalum (Aphanopetalaceae)
          - - Tetracarpaea (Tetracarpaeaceae)
            - - Penthorum (Penthoraceae)
              - Haloragaceae s.s. (8)
      - Saxifragaceae alliance
        - - Iteaceae (including Pterostemonaceae) (2)
        - - Ribes (Grossulariaceae)
          - Saxifragaceae s.s. (33)

100% maximum likelihood bootstrap support except where labeled with bootstrap percentage
Monogeneric families are represented by genus names, otherwise the number of genera is in (parentheses)
Cynomorium (Cynomoriaceae) remains unplaced within this tree

=== Subdivision ===
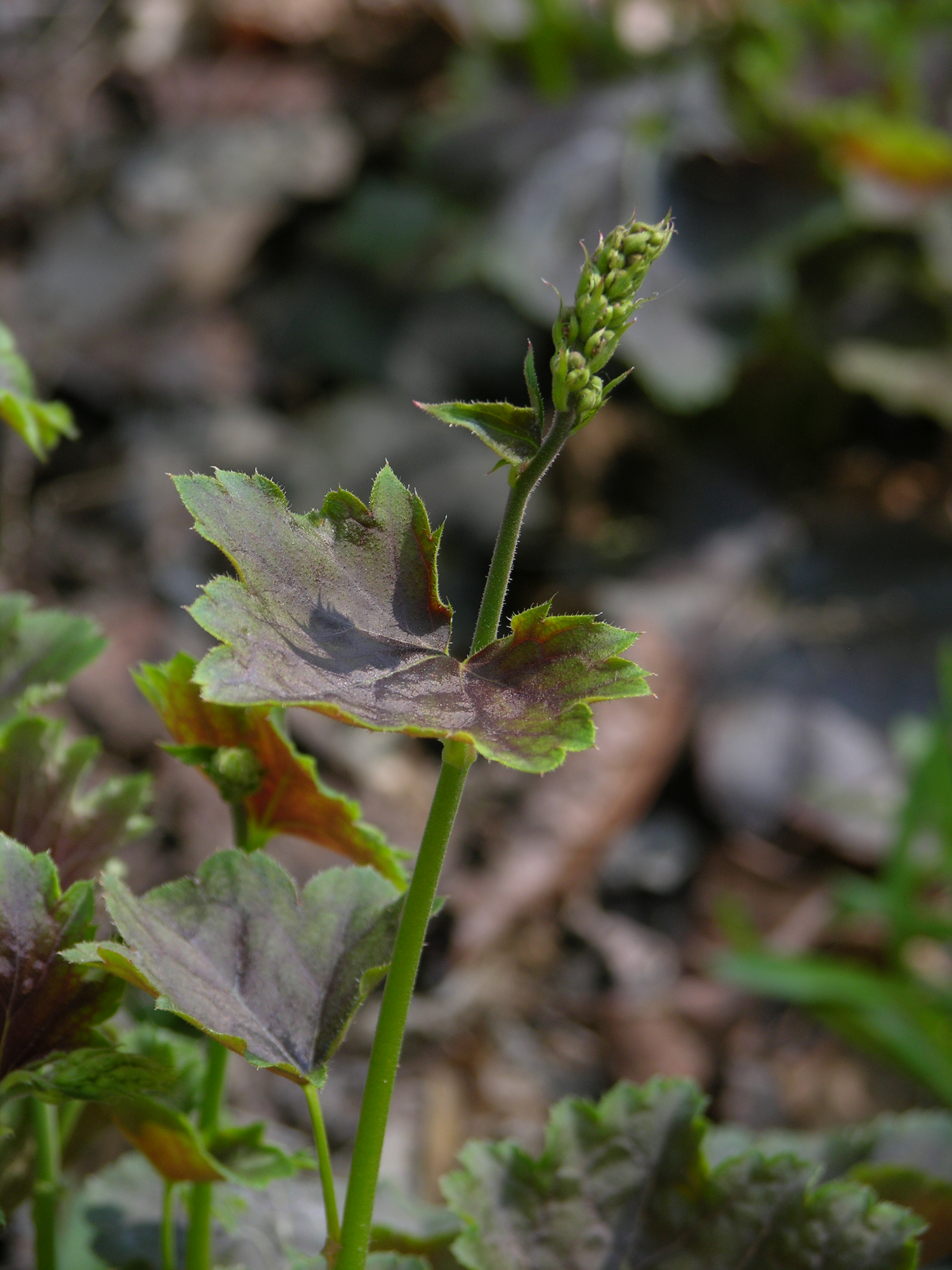
Heuchera americana

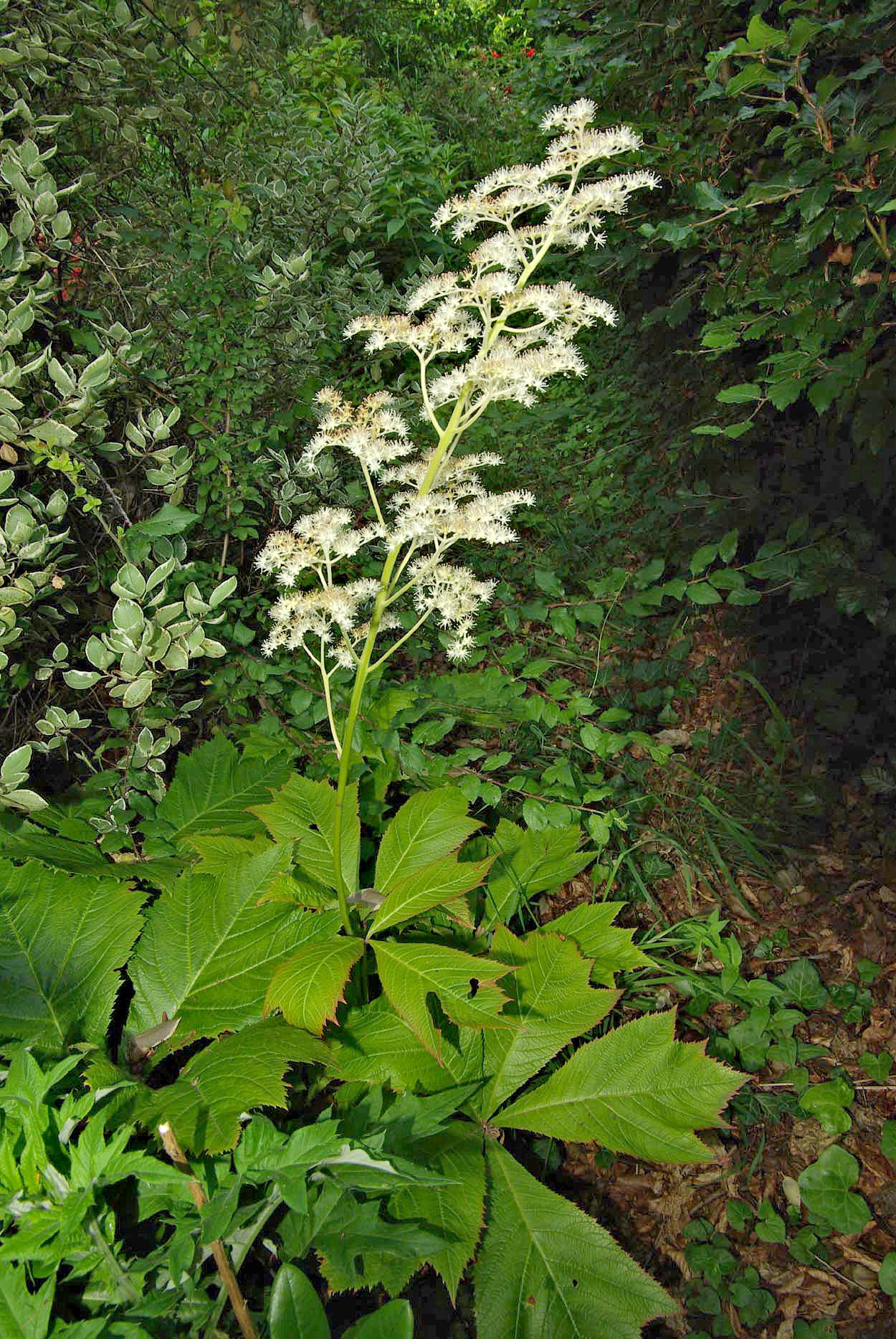
Rodgersia podophylla

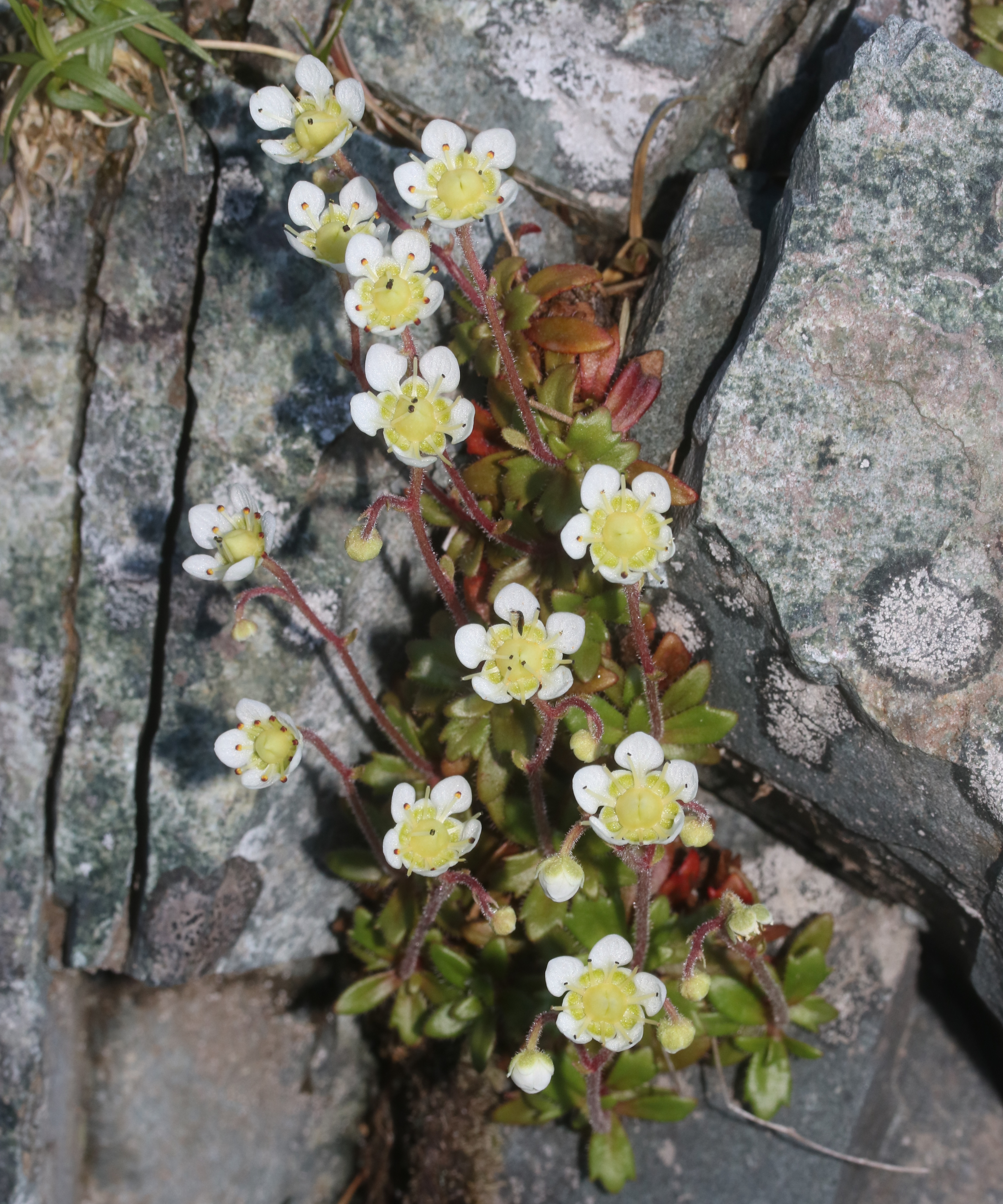
Micranthes merkii

Numerous attempts have been made to subdivide Saxifragoideae (Saxifragaceae s.s.). These have included dividing the family by the placentation of the ovules, as either parietal (e.g. Heuchera) or axile (e.g. Saxifraga). None of these has been supported by molecular data.

Molecular data indicate that the family can be considered as a number of informal clades, with two main lineages, saxifragoids and heucheroids and further subdivision of heucheroids into nine subclades or groups:

Clades (Genera (Species))

- Saxifragoids (Saxifraga (370))
- Heucheroids (remaining genera):
  - Leptarrhena (Leptarrhena (1), Tanakaea (1))
  - Saniculiphyllum (Saniculiphyllum (1))
  - Boykinia (Boykinia (6), Bolandra (2), Hieronymusia (1), Jepsonia (3), Sullivantia (3), Suksdorfia (2), Telesonix (2))
  - Astilbe (Astilbe (23), Saxifragopsis (1))
  - Heuchera (Heuchera (36), Bensoniella (1), Conimitella (1), Elmera (1), Lithophragma (10), Mitella (20), Tellima (1), Tiarella (3), Tolmiea (1))
  - Cascadia (Cascadia (1), Saxifragodes (1))
  - Darmera (Darmera (1), Astilboides (1), Bergenia (10), Mukdenia (1), Oresitrophe (1), Rodgersia (5))
  - Peltoboykinia (Peltoboykinia (1), Chrysosplenium (55))
  - Micranthes (Micranthes (70))

The clades and subclades are related as shown in the cladogram:

Cladogram II: Infrafamilial structure of Saxifragaceae

- Saxifragaceae 38
  - Saxifragoids 30
    Saxifraga
  - Heucheroids 31
    - - 20
        - 18
          - 8
            Leptarrhena
          - 16
            - Saniculiphyllum
            - 11
              Boykinia
        - 14
          Astilbe
      - - - 7
            Heuchera
          - 29
            - - 19
                Cascadia
              - 10
                Darmera
            - 27
              - 23
                Peltoboykinia
              - 15
                Micranthes

Diversification time in Mya underneath group names

==== Genera ====
Saxifragaceae s.s. has about 33–35 genera and about 640 species. About half of the genera (18 of 33) are monotypic, but Saxifraga has about 400 species, and has generally been divided into sections.

=== Evolution and biogeography ===
The crown group of Saxifragaceae diversified at about 38 Mya (Mid–Late Eocene), with the two main lineages diversifying arising at about 30 Mya (Late Miocene/Early Oligocene). The present day heucheroid diversity dates later than the Miocene (see sublabels in Cladogram II). Ancestral Saxafragaceae emerged in either East Asia or Western North America, with subsequent dispersal West to Europe and south to South America. From the Eocene to the late Miocene these ancestral land masses were joined by the Bering Land Bridge facilitating plant migration.

=== Etymology ===
The family and type genus name are derived from the two Latin words saxum (rock), and frango (to break), but the exact origin is unknown, although surmised to refer to either growing in crevices in rocks or medicinal use for kidney stones.

== Distribution and habitat ==
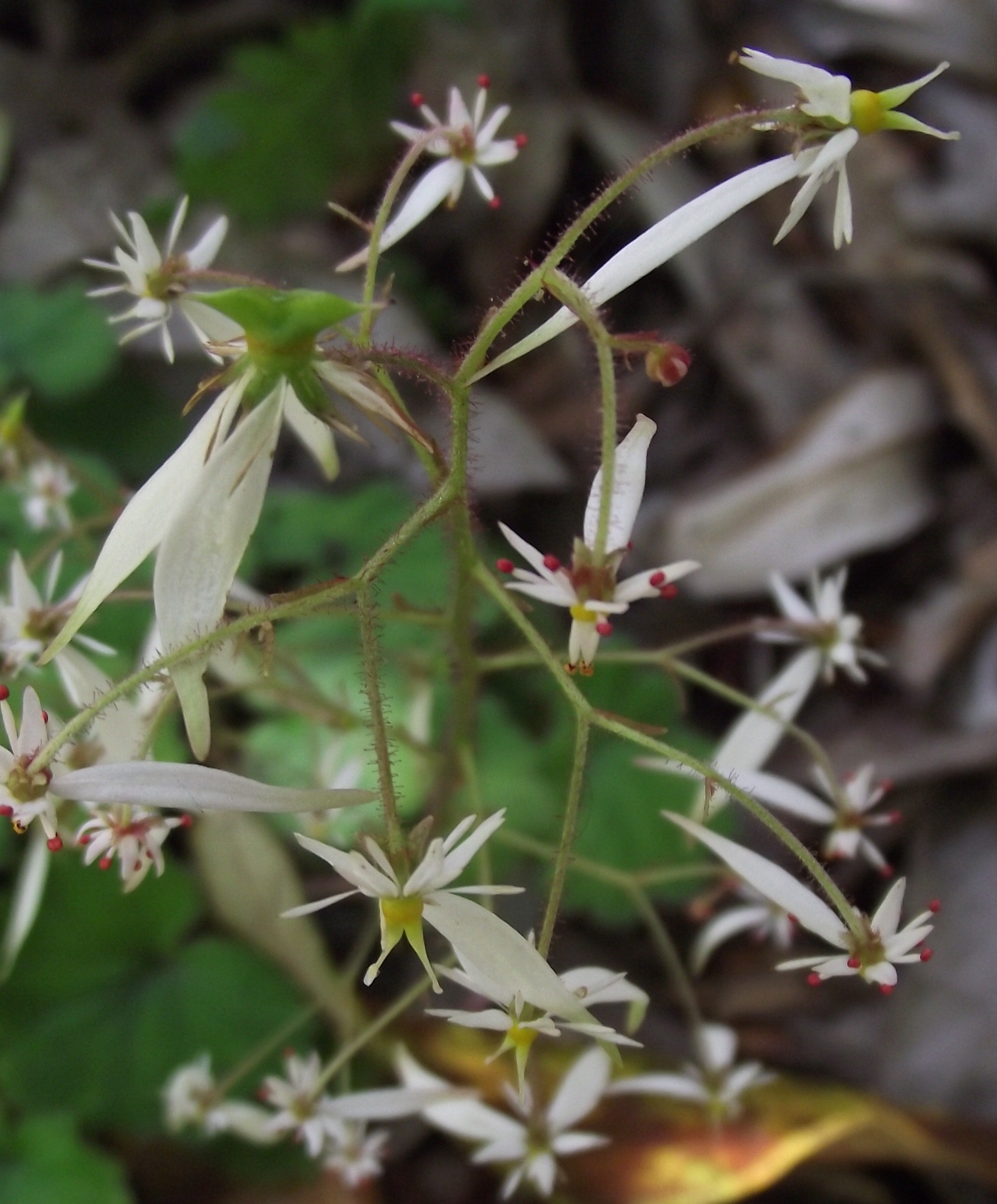
The native range of Saxifraga rufescens is Tibet, Sichuan, west Hubei, Yunnan in China to Myanmar. In 2024, it was also recorded in Nagaland for the first time.

Primarily Northern hemisphere temperate and arctic regions, and also tropical montane, including the Americas, Europe, North Africa (including montane Ethiopia) and temperate and subtropical Asia to Luzon and New Guinea. In the Americas it extends south to central Mexico and the Andes to Tierra del Fuego. Centres of diversity are western N America, East Asia and the Himalayas. The largest concentration of genera are in the Pacific North West. Some Saxifraga and Chrysosplenium are circumboreal. Others have disjunct distributions between E Asia and N America, while other taxa have separate narrow distributions in southern S America. Some species are found in wet woodlands, swamplike conditions and wet cliff edges.

== Bibliography ==
=== Books ===
- Byng, James W. (2014). "Saxifragales". The Flowering Plants Handbook: A practical guide to families and genera of the world. Plant Gateway Ltd. pp. 156–166. ISBN 978-0-9929993-1-5.
- Christenhusz, Maarten J. M.; Fay, Michael F.; Chase, Mark W. (2017). "Saxifragales". Plants of the World: An Illustrated Encyclopedia of Vascular Plants. University of Chicago Press. pp. 231–244. ISBN 978-0-226-52292-0.
- Kubitzki, Klaus, ed. (2007). "Introduction to Saxifragales". Flowering Plants. Eudicots: Berberidopsidales, Buxales, Crossosomatales, Fabales p.p., Geraniales, Gunnerales, Myrtales p.p., Proteales, Saxifragales, Vitales, Zygophyllales, Clusiaceae Alliance, Passifloraceae Alliance, Dilleniaceae, Huaceae, Picramniaceae, Sabiaceae. The Families and Genera of Vascular Plants. Vol. IX. Springer. pp. 15–18. ISBN 978-3-540-32219-1.
  - Soltis, D E (2007). Saxifragaceae. pp. 418–435., in Kubitzki (2007)
- Schulze-Menz, G K (1964). "Saxifragaceae". In Melchior, Hans; Werdermann, E (eds.). A. Engler's Syllabus der Pflanzenfamilien: mit besonderer Berücksichtigung der Nutzpflanzen nebst einer Übersicht über die Florenreiche und Florengebiete der Erde. (2 vols.) (12th ed.). Berlin: Gebrüder Borntraeger Verlag. pp. 201–206. (see also Syllabus der Pflanzenfamilien)

=== Articles ===
- Angiosperm Phylogeny Group IV (2016). "An update of the Angiosperm Phylogeny Group classification for the orders and families of flowering plants: APG IV". Botanical Journal of the Linnean Society. 181 (1): 1–20. doi:10.1111/boj.12385.
- Christenhusz, Maarten JM & Byng, J. W. (2016). "The number of known plants species in the world and its annual increase". Phytotaxa. 261 (3). Magnolia Press: 201–217. Bibcode:2016Phytx.261..201C. doi:10.11646/phytotaxa.261.3.1.
- Deng, Jia-bin; Drew, Bryan T.; Mavrodiev, Evgeny V.; Gitzendanner, Matthew A.; Soltis, Pamela S.; Soltis, Douglas E. (February 2015). "Phylogeny, divergence times, and historical biogeography of the angiosperm family Saxifragaceae". Molecular Phylogenetics and Evolution. 83: 86–98. Bibcode:2015MolPE..83...86D. doi:10.1016/j.ympev.2014.11.011. PMID 25479063.
- Jian, Shuguang; Soltis, Pamela S.; Gitzendanner, Matthew A.; Moore, Michael J.; Li, Ruiqi; Hendry, Tory A.; Qiu, Yin-Long; Dhingra, Amit; Bell, Charles D.; Soltis, Douglas E. (February 2008). "Resolving an ancient, rapid radiation in Saxifragales". Systematic Biology. 57 (1): 38–57. doi:10.1080/10635150801888871. PMID 18275001.
- Morgan, David R.; Soltis, Douglas E. (1993). "Phylogenetic Relationships Among Members of Saxifragaceae Sensu Lato Based on rbcL Sequence Data". Annals of the Missouri Botanical Garden. 80 (3): 631. Bibcode:1993AnMBG..80..631M. doi:10.2307/2399851. JSTOR 2399851.
- Soltis, Douglas E.; Soltis, Pamela S. (April 1997). "Phylogenetic relationships in Saxifragaceae sensu lato: a comparison of topologies based on 18S rDNA and rbcL sequences". American Journal of Botany. 84 (4): 504–522. Bibcode:1997AmJB...84..504S. doi:10.2307/2446027. JSTOR 2446027. PMID 21708603.
- Soltis, Douglas E.; Morgan, David R.; Grable, Albert; Soltis, Pamela S.; Kuzoff, Robert (September 1993). "Molecular Systematics of Saxifragaceae Sensu Stricto". American Journal of Botany. 80 (9): 1056. doi:10.2307/2445753. JSTOR 2445753.

=== Websites ===
- Stevens, P.F. (2019) [2001]. "Saxifragales". AP Web v. 14. Missouri Botanical Garden. (see also Angiosperm Phylogeny Website)
- POWO (2019). "Saxifragaceae Juss". Plants of the World Online. Royal Botanic Gardens, Kew.
