= H. sanguinea =

H. sanguinea may refer to:

- Heuchera sanguinea, the coral bells, a flowering plant species in the genus Heuchera
- Himatione sanguinea, the ʻapapane, a bird species endemic to Hawaii
- Holmskioldia sanguinea, a flowering plant species
