= Heuchera caroliniana =

Scientific classification
- Kingdom: Plantae
- Clade: Tracheophytes
- Clade: Angiosperms
- Clade: Eudicots
- Order: Saxifragales
- Family: Saxifragaceae
- Genus: Heuchera
- Species: H. caroliniana

Binomial name
- Heuchera caroliniana (Rosend., Butters & Lakela) E.F.Wells

Synonyms
- Heuchera americana var. caroliniana Rosend., Butters & Lakela

Species of flowering plant

Heuchera caroliniana, the Carolina alumroot, is a species of flowering plant in the family Saxifragaceae, native to the US states of Virginia, North Carolina and South Carolina. Split off from Heuchera americana, which it closely resembles, it is found the northwestern and west-central Piedmont, where H. americana is largely absent. It grows in rich upland woods on base-saturated substrates, basic dikes, and basic rock outcroppings.
