= H. elegans =

H. elegans may refer to:

== Species ==
- Harpoceras elegans, an ammonite species in the genus Harpoceras
- Haplocyon elegans, an extinct mammal species
- Heuchera elegans, the urn-flowered alumroot, a flowering plant species endemic to California
- Hydrophis elegans, the elegant sea snake
- Hyospathe elegans, a palm species in the genus Hyospathe widespread in Central and South America, southward to Bolivia
- Hypericum elegans, a species of flowering plant in the St. John's wort genus

== Synonyms ==
- Humboltia elegans, a synonym of Stelis roseopunctata, an orchid species
