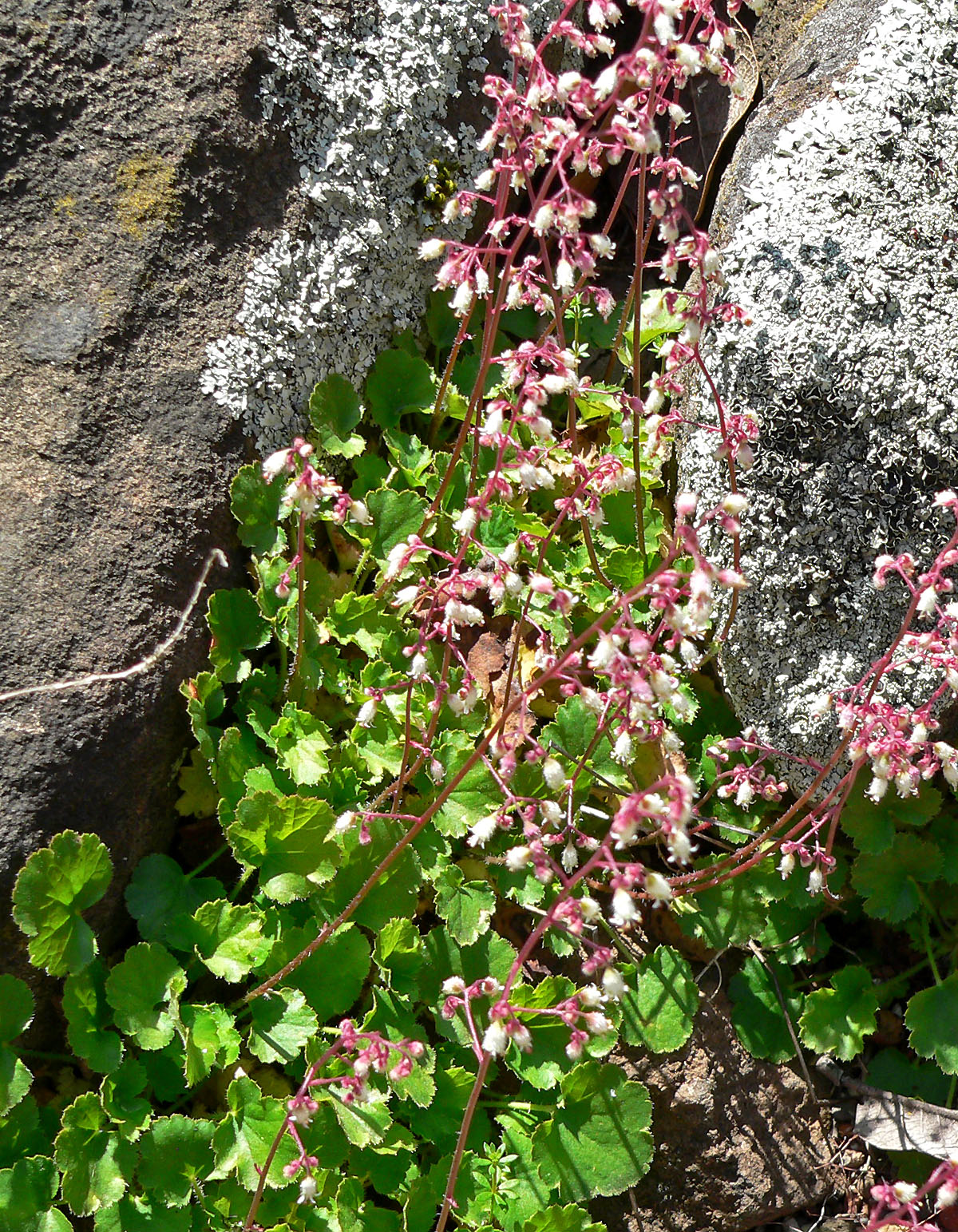
- Heuchera rubescens var. rydbergiana at the University of California Botanical Garden, Berkeley, California.

Scientific classification
- Kingdom: Plantae
- Clade: Tracheophytes
- Clade: Angiosperms
- Clade: Eudicots
- Order: Saxifragales
- Family: Saxifragaceae
- Genus: Heuchera
- Species: H. rubescens

Binomial name
- Heuchera rubescens Torr.

= Heuchera rubescens =

Species of flowering plant

Heuchera rubescens, with the common name pink alumroot, is a species of Heuchera.

The small perennial plant is native to the Western United States and northern Mexico. It grows in dry, rocky places.
