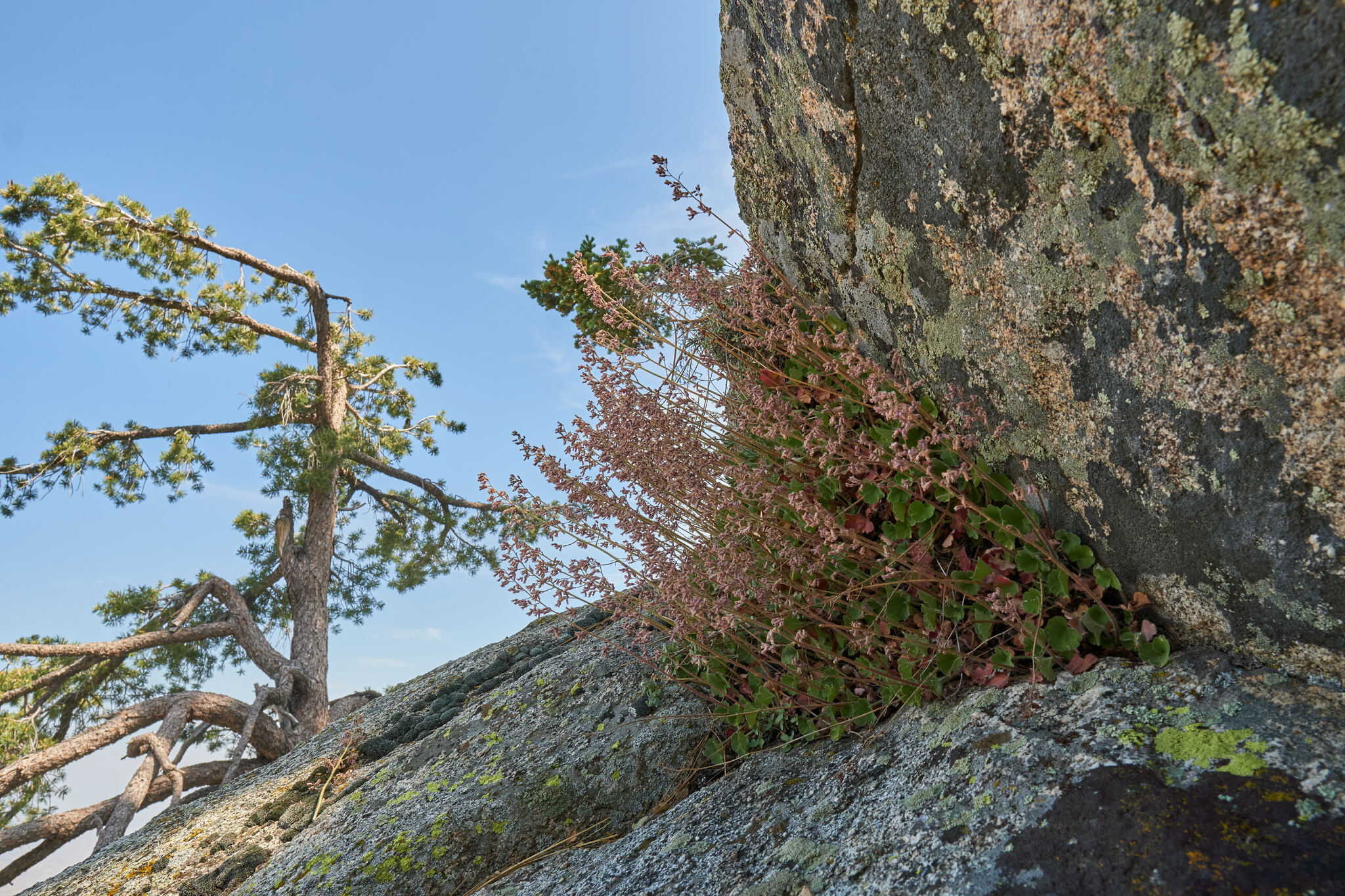
- Growing in native habitat on a cliffside in the San Jacinto mountains

Scientific classification
- Kingdom: Plantae
- Clade: Tracheophytes
- Clade: Angiosperms
- Clade: Eudicots
- Order: Saxifragales
- Family: Saxifragaceae
- Genus: Heuchera
- Species: H. hirsutissima

Binomial name
- Heuchera hirsutissima Rosend., Butters & Lakela

= Heuchera hirsutissima =

Species of flowering plant

Heuchera hirsutissima is a species of flowering plant in the saxifrage family known by the common name shaggy-haired alumroot.

== Distribution ==
The perennial is endemic to the San Jacinto Mountains of Riverside County, California, where it grows on rocky slopes.

While uncommon in the wild, this species is cultivated as an attractive garden flower and ornamental plant.

== Description ==
Heuchera hirsutissima is a rhizomatous perennial herb with small, lobed, rounded leaves.

It produces an erect, hairy inflorescence which bears light pink flowers.
