= Heuchera eastwoodiae =

Conservation status
- Vulnerable (NatureServe)

Scientific classification
- Kingdom: Plantae
- Clade: Tracheophytes
- Clade: Angiosperms
- Clade: Eudicots
- Order: Saxifragales
- Family: Saxifragaceae
- Genus: Heuchera
- Species: H. eastwoodiae

Binomial name
- Heuchera eastwoodiae Rosend., Butters & Lakela

Species of flowering plant

Heuchera eastwoodiae is a species of flowering plant in the saxifrage family, Saxifragaceae. It is endemic to Arizona in the United States, where it is found in Gila, Maricopa and Yavapai Counties. It is known by the common names Senator Mine alumroot and Eastwood alumroot.

This species is a perennial herb growing up to half a meter tall. The rounded, scalloped leaves grow on long stalks at the base of the stem. The inflorescence is a raceme of flowers with yellow-green sepals and no petals. It is the only Heuchera with six-parted flowers. The plant grows in ponderosa pine forests on rocky clay soils.

The species is named for Alice Eastwood. The first common name alludes to the Senator Mine, a 19th-Century metal mine in the Bradshaw Mountains in Yavapai County, the plant's type locality.
