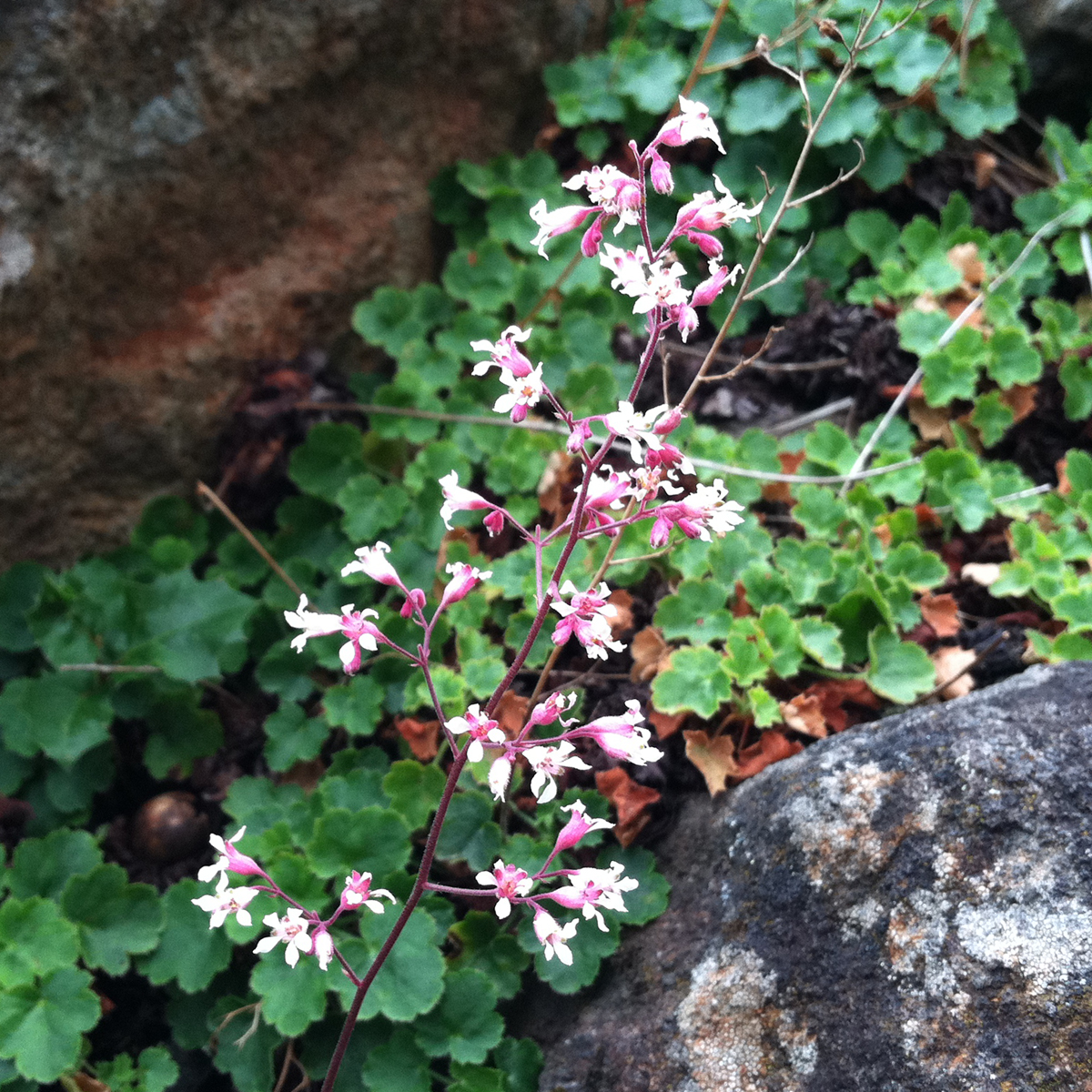

Conservation status
- Imperiled (NatureServe)

Scientific classification
- Kingdom: Plantae
- Clade: Tracheophytes
- Clade: Angiosperms
- Clade: Eudicots
- Order: Saxifragales
- Family: Saxifragaceae
- Genus: Heuchera
- Species: H. brevistaminea

Binomial name
- Heuchera brevistaminea Wiggins

= Heuchera brevistaminea =

Species of flowering plant

Heuchera brevistaminea is a rare species of flowering plant in the saxifrage family known by the common name Laguna Mountains alumroot. It is endemic to the Laguna Mountains of San Diego County, California. It grows in rock crevices and steep cliffsides in chaparral and yellow pine forest habitats. This is a rhizomatous perennial herb producing an inflorescence up to 25 centimeters tall. The flowers are bright pink or magenta.

Ira L. Wiggins reported this species from the adjacent Sierra Juarez in Baja California, but there are no specimens to verify this claim.
