= Heuchera pulchella =

Sandia Mountain alumroot

Scientific classification
- Kingdom: Plantae
- Clade: Tracheophytes
- Clade: Angiosperms
- Clade: Eudicots
- Order: Saxifragales
- Family: Saxifragaceae
- Genus: Heuchera
- Species: H. pulchella

Binomial name
- Heuchera pulchella Wooton & Standl.

Species of flowering plant

Heuchera pulchella, the Sandia Mountain alumroot or Sandia Mountain coral-bells, is a plant species endemic to central New Mexico, mostly in the Manzano and Sandia Mountains, but cultivated as an ornamental elsewhere. It grows in canyons and on steep mountain slopes in Torrance, Bernalillo, and Sandoval Counties at elevations of 2700–3200 m.

Heuchera pulchella is an herb with a woody caudex below ground. Leaves are deeply 5-lobed, up to 2 cm long. Flowering stalks are up to 15 cm tall, with a one-sided raceme. Flowers are about 5 mm across, with red sepals and pink petals.
