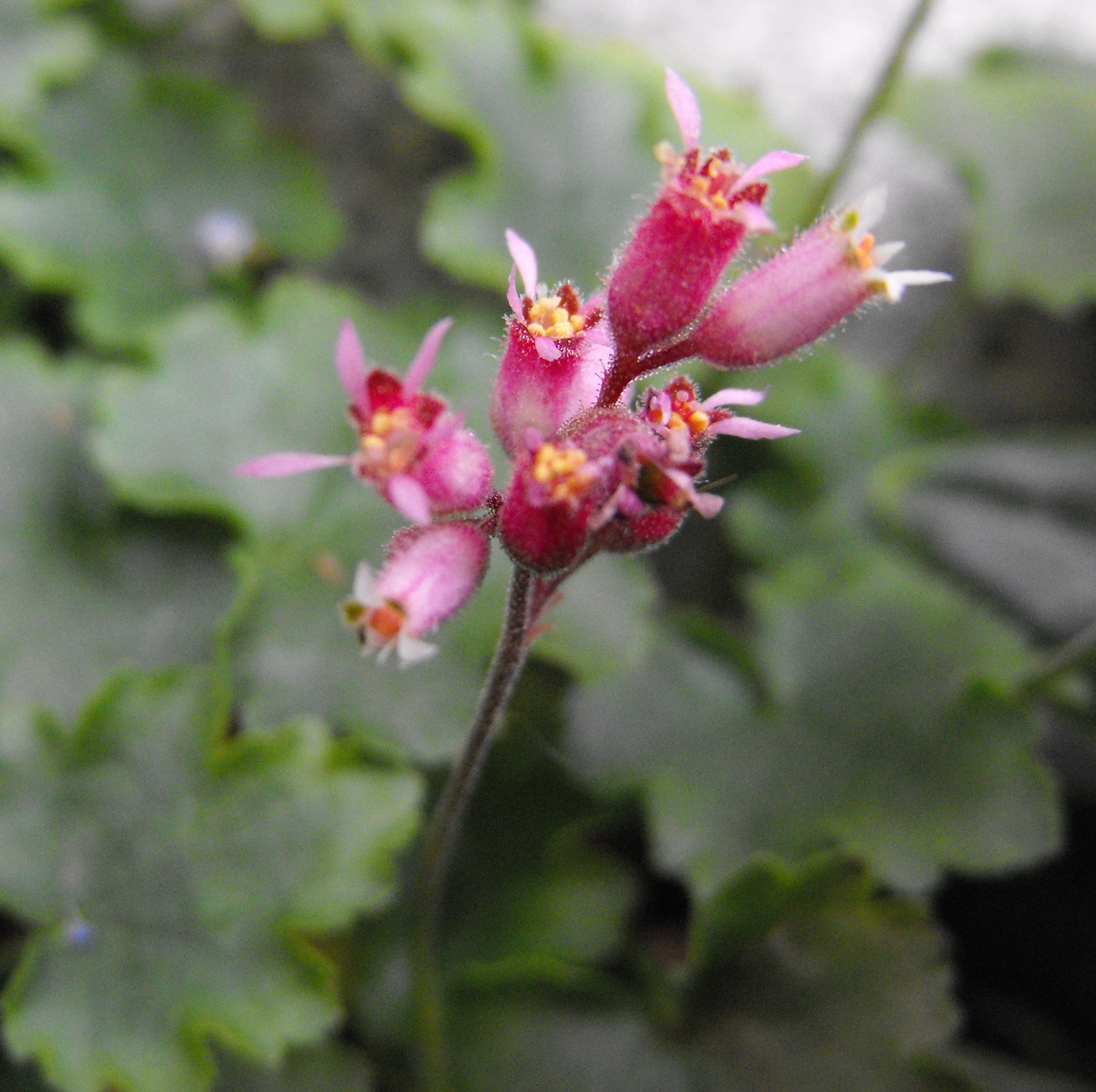

Scientific classification
- Kingdom: Plantae
- Clade: Tracheophytes
- Clade: Angiosperms
- Clade: Eudicots
- Order: Saxifragales
- Family: Saxifragaceae
- Genus: Heuchera
- Species: H. abramsii

Binomial name
- Heuchera abramsii Rydb.

= Heuchera abramsii =

Species of flowering plant

Heuchera abramsii is a rare species of flowering plant in the saxifrage family known by the common names San Gabriel alumroot and Abrams' alumroot.

It is endemic to the San Gabriel Mountains of southern California, where it grows on rocky slopes.

Heuchera abramsii is a rhizomatous perennial herb with small five-lobed leaves. It produces an inflorescence up to 15 centimeters tall which bears bright pink or magenta rounded, bell-like flowers.

The epithet abramsii commemorates LeRoy Abrams.
