= Heuchera parishii =

Scientific classification
- Kingdom: Plantae
- Clade: Tracheophytes
- Clade: Angiosperms
- Clade: Eudicots
- Order: Saxifragales
- Family: Saxifragaceae
- Genus: Heuchera
- Species: H. parishii

Binomial name
- Heuchera parishii Dougl. ex Lindl.

Species of flowering plant

Heuchera parishii is a species of flowering plant in the saxifrage family known by the common names Mill Creek alumroot and Parish's alumroot. It is endemic to California, where it is found in the San Bernardino Mountains. This is a rhizomatous perennial herb producing a patch of lobed, kidney-shaped leaves up to four centimeters wide. It bears an erect inflorescence up to about 27 centimeters in height which blooms in dense clusters of salmon-pink flowers. The plant gets its common name from Mill Creek.
