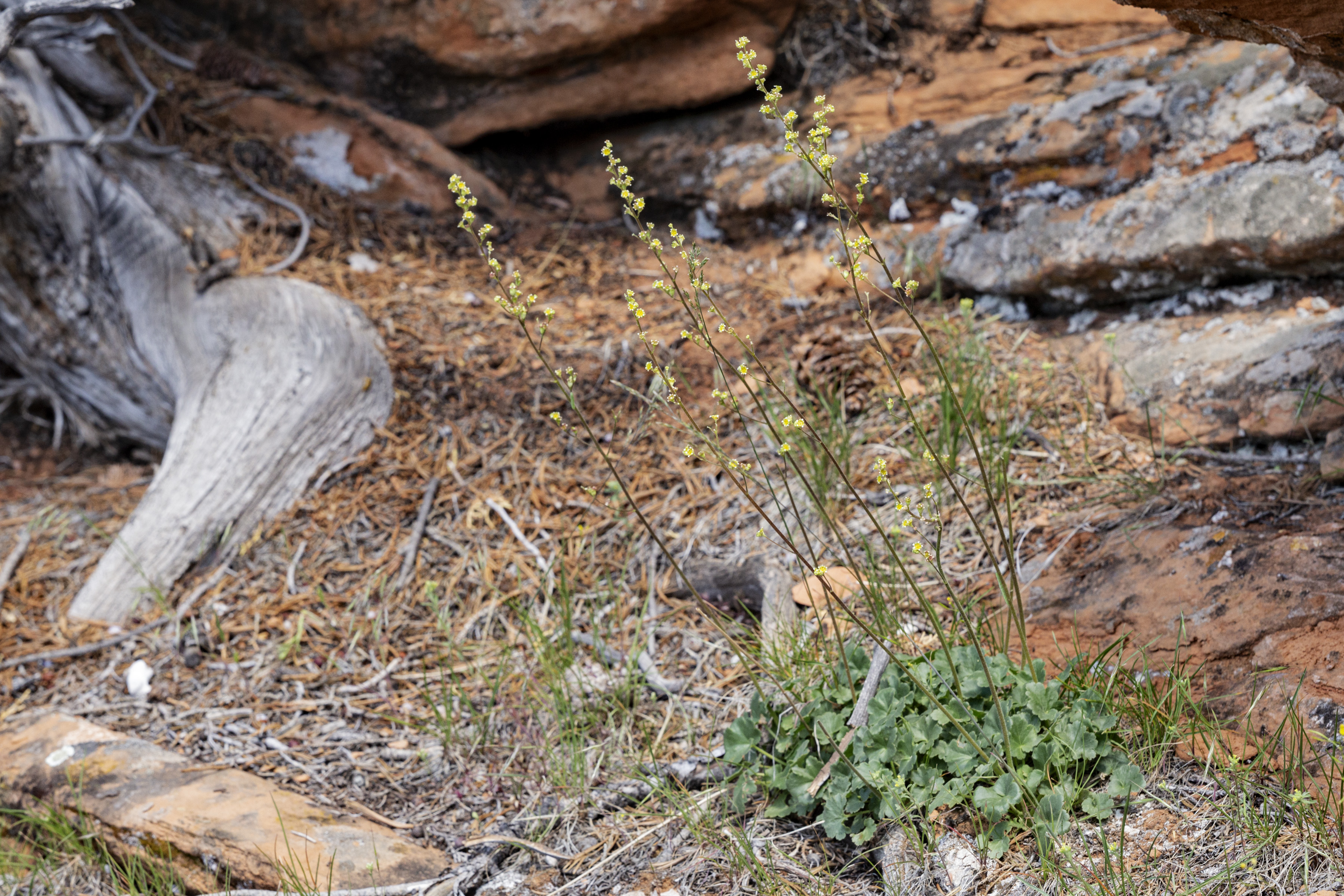

Scientific classification
- Kingdom: Plantae
- Clade: Tracheophytes
- Clade: Angiosperms
- Clade: Eudicots
- Order: Saxifragales
- Family: Saxifragaceae
- Genus: Heuchera
- Species: H. parvifolia

Binomial name
- Heuchera parvifolia Nutt. ex Torr. & A.Gray

= Heuchera parvifolia =

Species of flowering plant

Heuchera parvifolia is a species of flowering plant in the saxifrage family known by the common names littleleaf alumroot and common alumroot. It is native to California and the Interior West of the United States, where it grows primarily on rocky ledges on slopes and canyon walls.

Heuchera parvifolia is a variable species, and has many proposed varieties, although these are not generally agreed upon. It has ovate to circular cordate leaves that are up to about 6 centimeters in length. It blooms from May to September, producing a 20–75 centimeter-long panicle of whitish, yellowish, or greenish flowers.

The specific epithet parvifolia means "small-leaved". Heuchera parvifolia is a separate species from the similarly-named Heuchera parviflora of the eastern United States.
