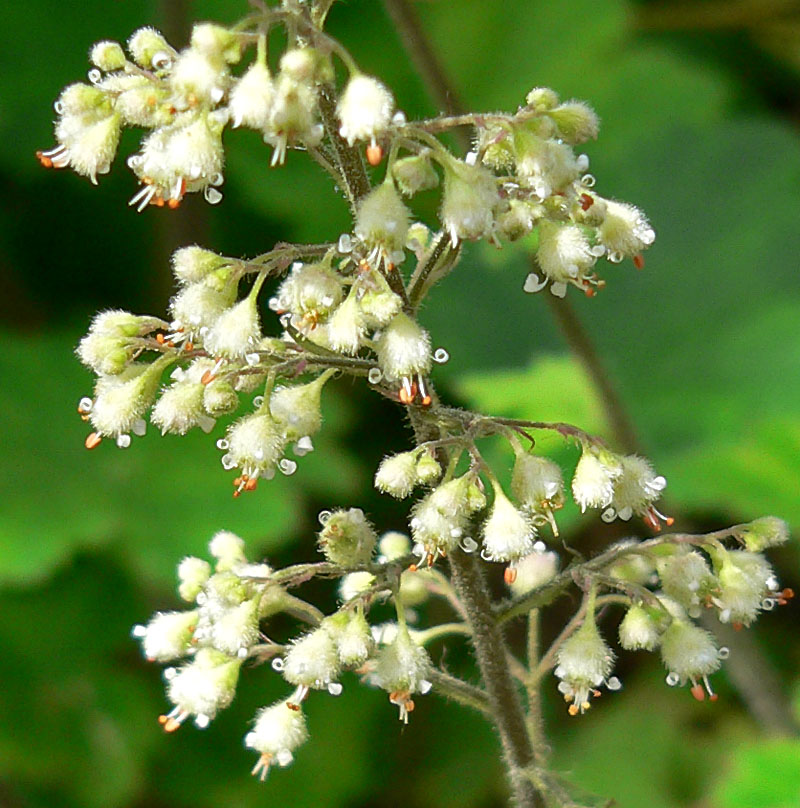

Conservation status
- Imperiled (NatureServe)

Scientific classification
- Kingdom: Plantae
- Clade: Tracheophytes
- Clade: Angiosperms
- Clade: Eudicots
- Order: Saxifragales
- Family: Saxifragaceae
- Genus: Heuchera
- Species: H. maxima

Binomial name
- Heuchera maxima Greene

= Heuchera maxima =

Species of flowering plant

Heuchera maxima is a species of flowering plant in the saxifrage family, known by the common names island alum root, Channel Islands coral bells, and Jill of the rocks.

It is endemic to the four northern Channel Islands of California, within Channel Islands National Park. It grows on canyon cliffs in coastal sage scrub habitats.

== Description ==
Heuchera maxima is a rhizomatous perennial herb growing a broad patch of large, rounded, multilobed green leaves with long petioles and a fringe of hairs along the edges. It grows 1–3 feet (30–91 cm) in height.

It produces an erect inflorescence up to 60 centimetres (24 in) tall, with many clusters of hairy, glandular flowers. Each flower is rounded with fleshy white or pink lobes and tiny petals curling away from the center. The protruding stamens are tipped with large anthers.

== Cultivation ==
Heuchera maxima is also cultivated as an ornamental plant for traditional, drought tolerant, native plant, and wildlife gardens. It prefers part shade, including as a groundcover in dry shade conditions under oaks.

== See also ==
- Flora of the Channel Islands of California
- List of California native plants
