= × Heucherella =

Scientific classification
- Kingdom: Plantae
- Clade: Tracheophytes
- Clade: Angiosperms
- Clade: Eudicots
- Order: Saxifragales
- Family: Saxifragaceae
- Genus: × Heucherella; H.R.Wehrh.

Species
- See text

Genus of flowering plants

× Heucherella is an evergreen perennial flowering plant in the family Saxifragaceae. A hybrid of garden origin, it is the result of a cross between two distinct genera, Heuchera and Tiarella, and shows similarities to both parents. This type of intergeneric hybrid is quite rare, and is indicated by a multiplication symbol before the name. The name Heucherella is an example of a portmanteau word, a combination of the two parents' names.

== History ==
× Heucherella was first bred in France in 1912 by Emile Lemoine, who created a sterile hybrid between Heuchera × brizoides and Tiarella cordifolia. It was later named ×Heucherella tiarelloides. 'Bridget Bloom' was bred in 1950s by Percy Piper, at the suggestion of Alan Bloom. It is a cross between Heuchera 'Freedom' with pink flowers and Tiarella wherryi. It was brought to Blooms of Bressingham in 1955 and had the market to itself until 1983, which was when 'Rosalie' appeared (Kemper, William T.) These two flowers have pink petals, resembling heuchera and tiarella, and some reddish purple markings on their dark green leaves. Around 1987 'Tinian Pink' and 'Tinian White' were both created by Charles Oliver of the Primrose Path. These go by the names 'Pink Frost' and 'Snow White' in the trade.

Where a heucherella grows well depends on its breeding lines. Heucherellas bred from shade-loving heucheras will grow best in shade or part shade, those bred from sun-loving heucheras perform better in part shade to full sun. Most heucherellas have the strongest colors when grown in partial shade (preferably afternoon shade). Heucherellas grow in USDA Zones 4–9, and in the milder zones are evergreen.

== Characteristics ==
Heucherellas take their brilliant foliage colors from the Heuchera parents and the dark leaf patterns and cut-leaf shapes from the Tiarella parents. They are often called by their botanical name × Heucherella, but the common name in the USA is "foamy bells" because the common names of the parent plants are "coral bells", and "foam flower" respectively. Flowers may be white, pink or cream, and usually appear in spring.

Heucherellas form clumps or small mounds of evergreen foliage with upright flower stalks 20–60 cm (8–24 in) long. Most heucherella prefer partial shade, though the newer strains are more sun tolerant. They prefer well-drained organic soils and regular watering. They send up new growth every year in spring. They make their best color displays in the cool seasons of spring or fall if they are of the colorful leaf type. They have few pests and diseases if grown in good soil in the proper conditions, and divided every three to four years.

They can be used as ground cover underneath shrubs like dogwood or beautyberry, or in association with hostas, ferns, astilbes, coral bells, and other shade-loving perennials. Other plant associations include barrenwort, bleeding heart, Japanese painted fern, Jacob's ladder, lamium, lungwort and Solomon's seal. Heucherella can also be placed in large containers to brighten up shady areas.

== Cultivars ==
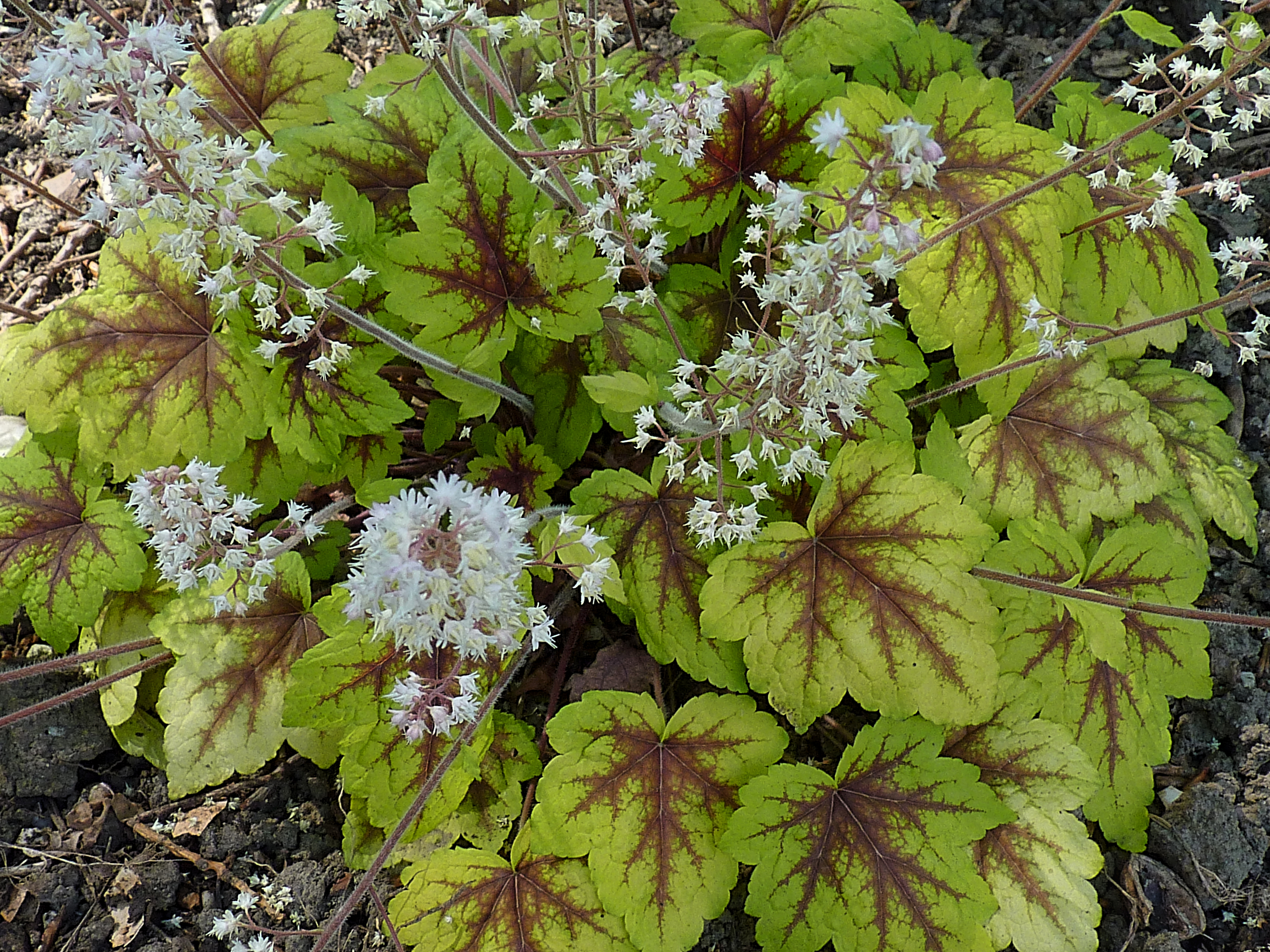
'Stoplight'

- 'Alabama Sunrise' - leaves gold with red veining, white flowers
- 'Bridget Bloom' - 30–45 cm (12–18 in); grows best in full sun with some shade in hot summers
- 'Burnished Bronze' - 10 cm (4 in) tall, 15 cm (6 in) wide, bronze foliage with light pink flowers
- 'Dayglow Pink'- 12–20 cm (5–8 in); maple-like green leaves with chocolate brown veining; bright pink flowers
- 'Fan Dancer' - rare, 50 cm (20 in) tall, 75 cm (30 in) wide; deep green leaves with a black & silver overlay, white flowers
- 'Gold Zebra' (was 'Golden Zebra') - leaves feathery, bright yellow, marked with dark red veins, white flowers
- 'Heart of Darkness' - green leaves with dark maroon spot bordered by silver-gray, white flowers on stalks up to 60 cm (24 in) high
- 'Kimono' - 10 cm (4 in) tall, 15 cm (6 in) wide, wrinkled green leaves with reddish purple markings; a larger set of leaves turn to coppery rose late in the season
- 'Pink Whisper' - 25 cm (10 in) tall, 30 cm (12 in) wide; maple-shaped green leaves with deep red veining, pink flowers
- 'Quicksilver' - 45 cm (18 in) tall, 50 cm (20 in) wide; best in full sun, but requires regular watering; rounded bronze leaves with silver overlay, white flowers
- 'Stoplight' - spread 15–25 cm (6–10 in), yellow leaves with dark red blotches, white flowers
- 'Strike It Rich' (syn. 'Goldstrike')- 20–35 cm (8–14 in) tall, 35 cm (14 in) wide; silver-green leaves with purple veining, light pink flowers
- 'Sunspot' - 15 cm (6 in) tall, 30 cm (12 in) wide, heart-shaped leaves with yellow centers, pink flowers tinged pale lilac; grows best in partial shade; a mutation of × H. 'Dayglow Pink'
- 'Sweet Tea' - 50 cm (20 in) tall, 70 cm (28 in) wide -large, cinnamon-colored maple-shaped leaves, white flowers
- 'Tapestry' - multicolored veins foliage with free-flowering stems of warm pink flowers
- 'Viking Ship' - 15 cm (6 in) tall, 30 cm (12 in) wide; maple-shaped silver leaves, coral pink flowers

The cultivars 'Brass Lantern', 'Kimono', and 'Yellowstone Falls' have gained the Royal Horticultural Society's Award of Garden Merit.
