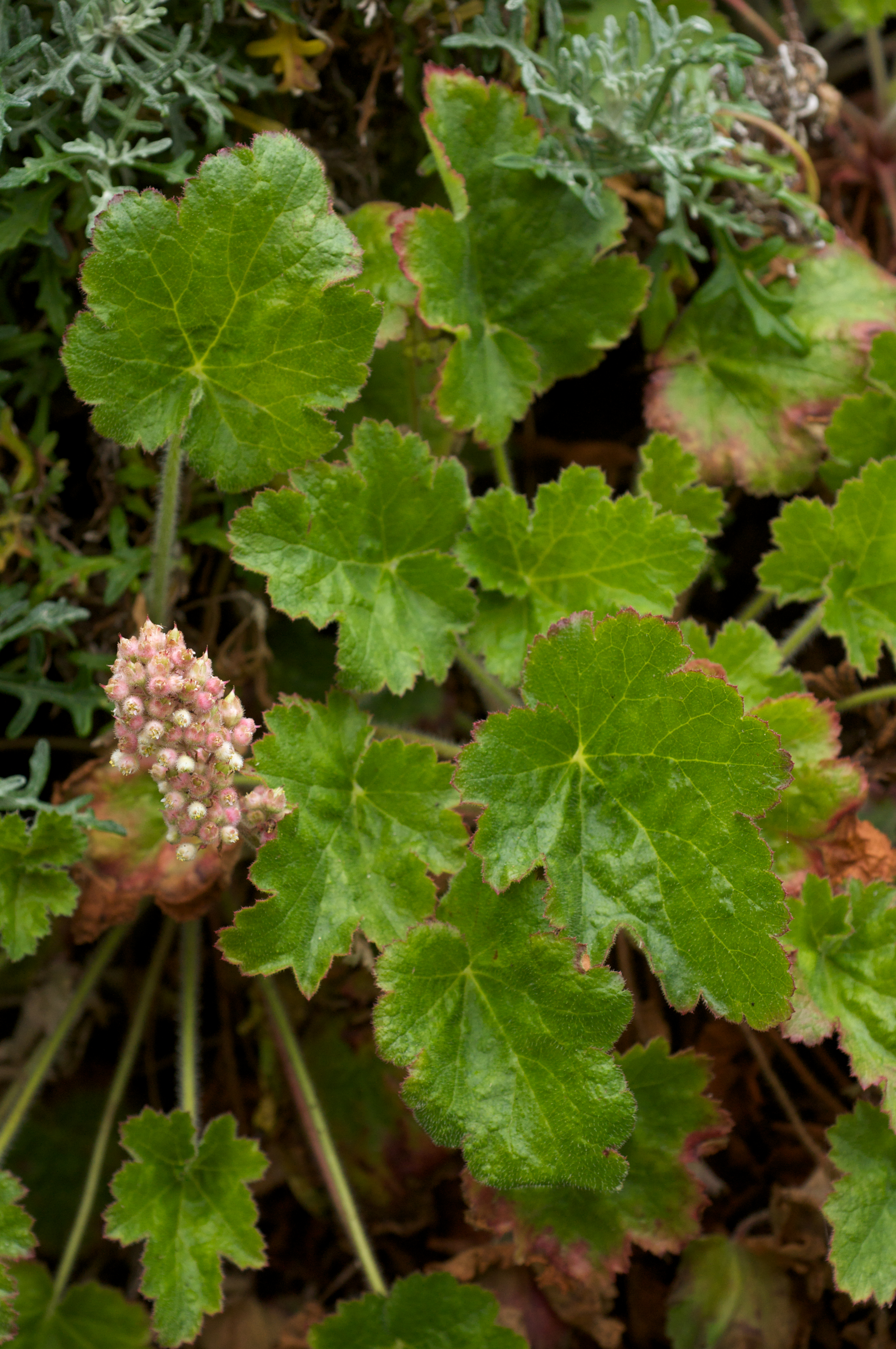

Scientific classification
- Kingdom: Plantae
- Clade: Tracheophytes
- Clade: Angiosperms
- Clade: Eudicots
- Order: Saxifragales
- Family: Saxifragaceae
- Genus: Heuchera
- Species: H. pilosissima

Binomial name
- Heuchera pilosissima Fisch. & C.A.Mey.

= Heuchera pilosissima =

Species of flowering plant

Heuchera pilosissima is a species of flowering plant in the saxifrage family known by the common name seaside alumroot and Parish's alumroot. It is endemic to the northern two thirds of the California coastline, where it grows on coastal bluffs and in nearby forests. This is a rhizomatous perennial herb producing lobed oval-shaped leaves 4 to 9 centimeters wide, each on a long petiole. The erect inflorescence reaches over half a meter in maximum height and is covered in glandular hairs. It bears dense clusters of rounded, hairy flowers. Each flower has pink or yellowish lobes tipped with small white or pink petals. The stamens and stigma protrude from the narrow mouth of the flower.
