= Johann Heinrich von Heucher =

German botanist and physicist (1677-1746)

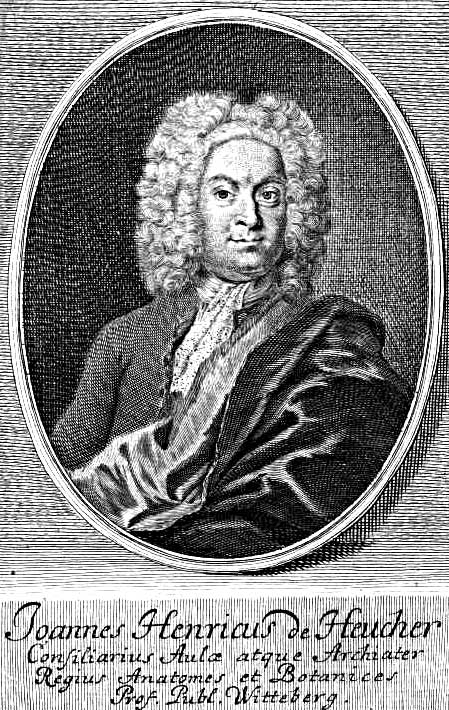
Johann Heinrich von Heucher

Johann Heinrich von Heucher (Johann Heinrich Heucher before his ennoblement; 1 January 1677 – 23 February 1747) was a German physician and botanist.

== Biography ==
Born in Vienna, his family moved to Wittenberg when he was twelve. He studied philosophy first, then medicine at the Universities of Wittenberg, Leipzig and Jena. Doctor of Medicine in 1700, he began to practice the medical profession; for a time he also taught philosophy at the University of Wittenberg. From 1709 he was professor of medicine in the same university (the chair gave close connection between medicine and medicinal herbs, also included the teaching of botany).

He participated in the founding of the Wittenberg Botanical Garden, the first catalog of which was published in 1711. He created collections of medical preparations.

He took care of the renovation of the anatomical theatre of the Saxon city.

In 1713 he became a personal physician to Augustus II the Strong, King of Poland and Elector of Saxony, and moved to Dresden; the commitment of his life became the transformation of the naturalistic collections of the king's ancient Kunstkammer into a series of specialized collections, first transferred to the Regimentshaus and then to the palatial complex of the Zwinger (1728).

Until his death, which took place in Dresden in 1747, he was appointed General and Special Director of the Scientific Galleries; in this capacity, he also took care of the arrangement of the print cabinet, which was separated from the collections of paintings and also exhibited at the Zwinger.

In 1729 he was admitted to the Royal Society and was ennobled by the Emperor.

A year before his death, in 1746, he sold his private library of about 4,000 volumes - many valuable scientific texts - to the royal library. He wrote works of some importance in the fields of anatomy, botany and mineralogy.

== Honours ==
Carl Linnaeus named the genus Heuchera of the family Saxifragaceae in his honor.

== Bibliography ==
- Karl Joseph Bouginé (de): Handbuch der allgemeinen Litterargeschichte nach Heumanns Grundriss. Zürich, 1791, S. 291
- C. T. Sachse und Adolph Drechsler: Allgemeine deutsche Naturhistorische Zeitung. Rudolf Kuntze Verlag, Hamburg 1855, Neue Folge 1. Band, S. 6
- Wurzbach, Constantin von, ed. (1862). "Heucher, Johann Heinrich von" . Biographisches Lexikon des Kaiserthums Oesterreich [Biographical Encyclopedia of the Austrian Empire] (in German). Vol. 8. p. 448 – via Wikisource.
- Heinrich Wilhelm Reichardt [in German] (1880). "Heucher, Johann Heinrich von" . Allgemeine Deutsche Biographie (in German). Vol. 12. Leipzig: Duncker & Humblot. p. 324.
- August Hirsch: Biographisches Lexikon der hervorragenden Aerzte aller Zeiten und Völker. (BÄL), Urban & Schwarzenberg, Wien und Leipzig 1886, Band 3, S. 188
- Walter Friedensburg: Geschichte der Universität Wittenberg. Max Niemeyer, Halle (Saale) 1917.
- Christian Dittrich; Martin Schuster; Thomas Ketelsen; Staatliche Kunstsammlungen Dresden (Hrsg.): Johann Heinrich von Heucher und Carl Heinrich von Heinecken: Beiträge zur Geschichte des Dresdner Kupferstichkabinetts im 18. Jh. Sandstein Verlag, Dresden 2010, ISBN 978-3-942422-11-6.
- Christian Dittrich: Johann Heinrich von Heucher und Carl Heinrich von Heineken. Beiträge zur Geschichte des Dresdner Kupferstichkabinetts im 18. Jahrhundert. Hrsg. von Martin Schuster und Thomas Ketelsen. Sandstein Verlag, Dresden 2010, ISBN 978-3-942422-11-6
