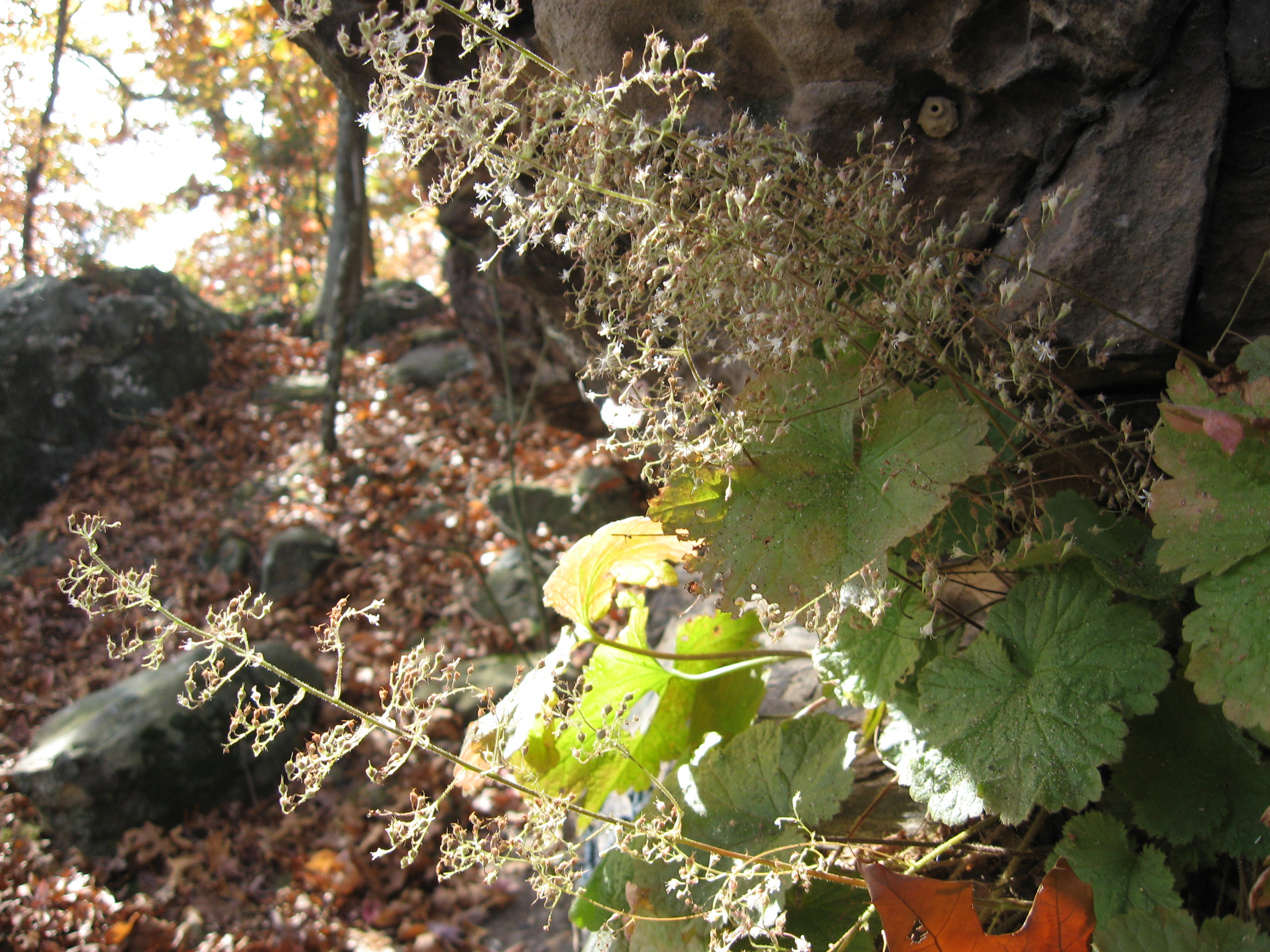

Scientific classification
- Kingdom: Plantae
- Clade: Tracheophytes
- Clade: Angiosperms
- Clade: Eudicots
- Order: Saxifragales
- Family: Saxifragaceae
- Genus: Heuchera
- Species: H. parviflora

Binomial name
- Heuchera parviflora Bartl.

= Heuchera parviflora =

Species of flowering plant

Heuchera parviflora is a species of flowering plant in the saxifrage family known by the common names cave alumroot and littleflower alumroot. It is native to the eastern United States, where it is found primarily in the Ozark Mountains, Appalachian Mountains, and Cumberland Plateau. It is found in deeply shaded areas such as under rock overhangs and cliffs, almost always where no direct sunlight falls. In this habitat, it is often the only vascular plant found. H. parviflora is an uncommon species throughout its range. It flowers in late summer through fall.

There are two varieties described, which are sometimes considered distinct species. These are:

- H. parviflora var. parviflora - Native to the Appalachian Mountains and the Interior Low Plateaus.
- H. parviflora var. puberula - Native to the Ozark Mountains

Heuchera parviflora is a separate species from the similarly named Heuchera parvifolia of the western United States.
