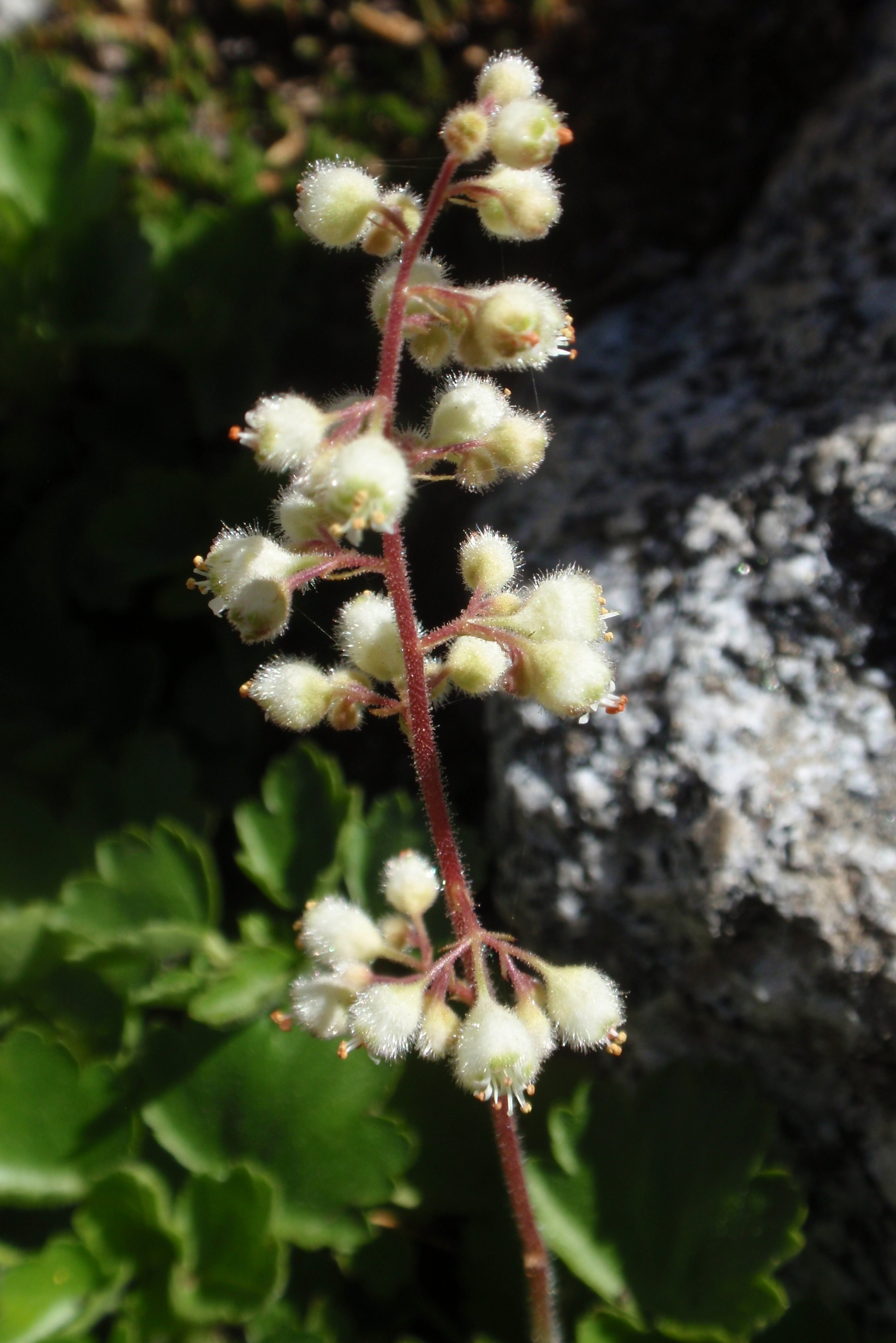

Scientific classification
- Kingdom: Plantae
- Clade: Tracheophytes
- Clade: Angiosperms
- Clade: Eudicots
- Order: Saxifragales
- Family: Saxifragaceae
- Genus: Heuchera
- Species: H. merriamii

Binomial name
- Heuchera merriamii Eastw.

Synonyms
- Heuchera pringlei Rydb.; Heuchera rubescens var. pringlei (Rydb.) Jeps.

= Heuchera merriamii =

Species of flowering plant

Heuchera merriamii is a species of flowering plant in the saxifrage family known by the common name Merriam's alumroot. It is native to the Klamath Mountains of southern Oregon and northern California, where it grows on the rocky slopes. This is a rhizomatous perennial herb producing a patch of leaves which are rounded and have five to seven lobes along the edges. It produces an erect inflorescence up to about 23 centimeters tall with sparse clusters of pinkish, yellow, or cream flowers. The inflorescence is covered in glandular hairs. Each flower has small spoon-shaped petals and protruding stamens.
