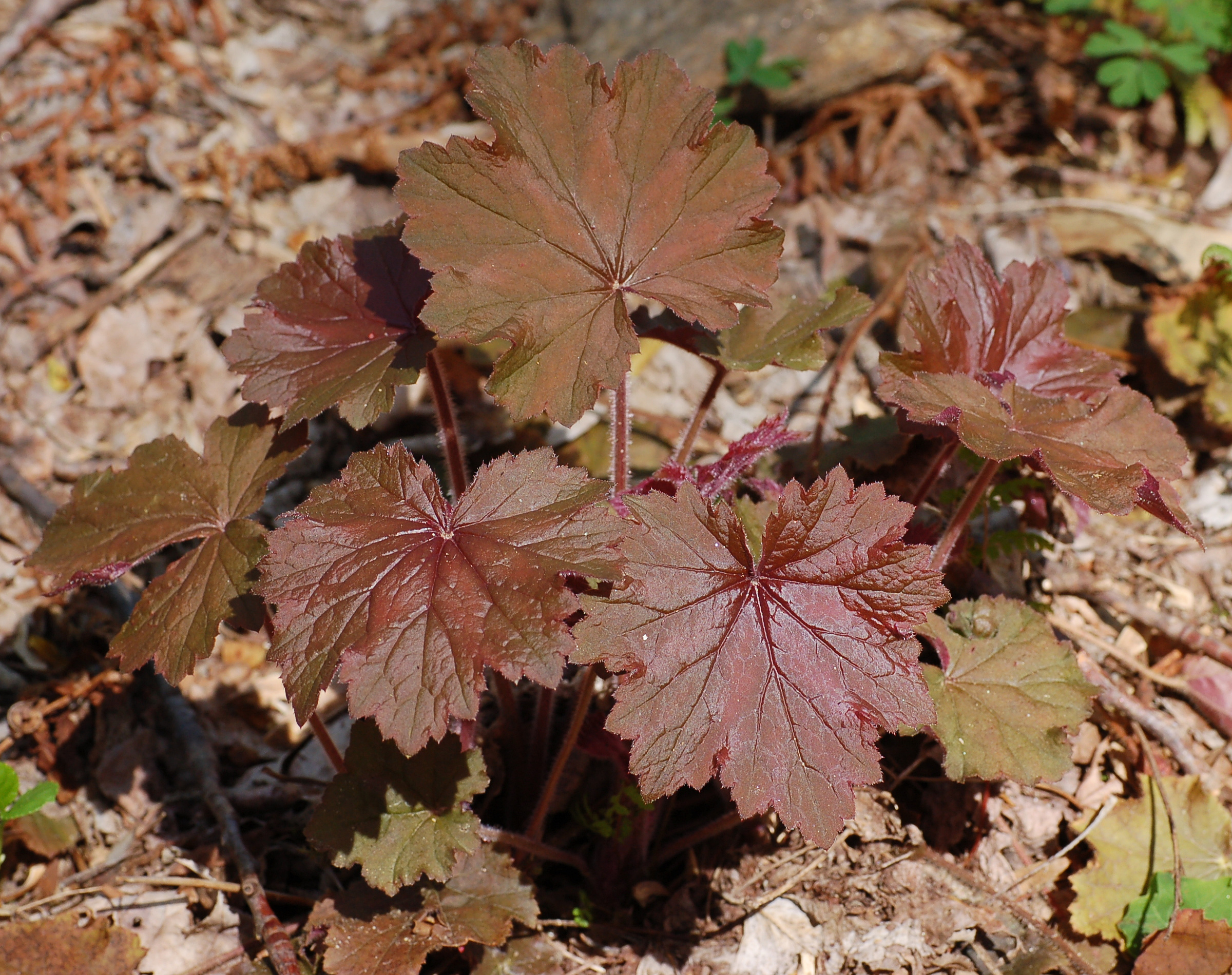
- Purple cultivar

Conservation status
- Secure (NatureServe)

Scientific classification
- Kingdom: Plantae
- Clade: Tracheophytes
- Clade: Angiosperms
- Clade: Eudicots
- Order: Saxifragales
- Family: Saxifragaceae
- Genus: Heuchera
- Species: H. villosa

Binomial name
- Heuchera villosa Michx.

= Heuchera villosa =

Species of flowering plant

Heuchera villosa, the hairy alumroot, is a small evergreen perennial native to the Eastern United States. It is found only on rock outcrops, growing on cliffs and boulders. Considered locally endangered in the state of Ohio.

Heuchera villosa is sometimes grown ornamentally, with some cultivars having a reddish leaf coloration.

There are two described varieties, which are sometimes considered distinct species. They are:

- Heuchera villosa var. macrorhiza - On calcareous substrates, primarily west of the Appalachian Mountains
- Heuchera villosa var. villosa - On acidic substrates, primarily of the Appalachian Mountains and eastward

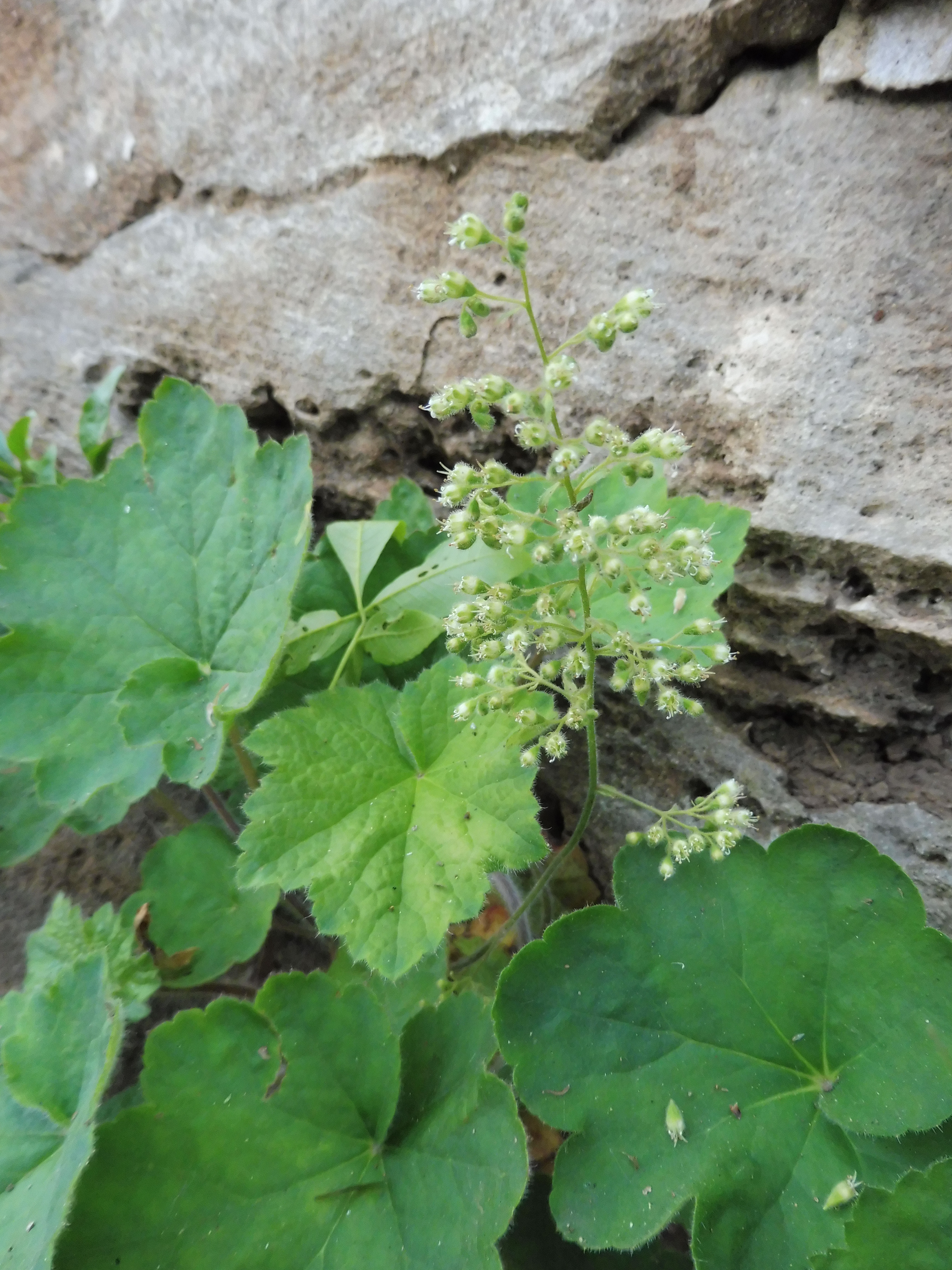
Variety macrorhiza, with broad, shallow leaf lobes and oblong inflorescence bracts
