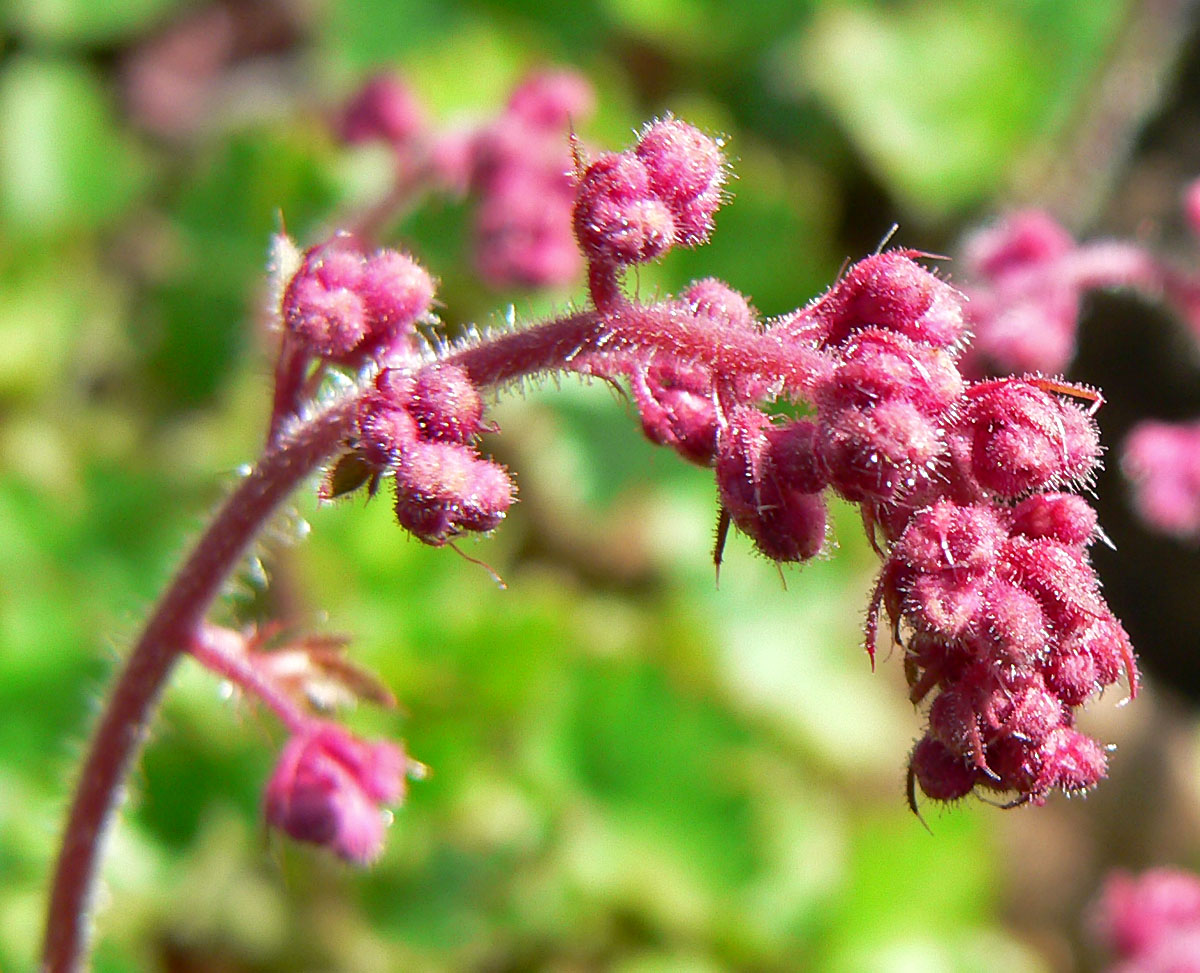

Scientific classification
- Kingdom: Plantae
- Clade: Tracheophytes
- Clade: Angiosperms
- Clade: Eudicots
- Order: Saxifragales
- Family: Saxifragaceae
- Genus: Heuchera
- Species: H. elegans

Binomial name
- Heuchera elegans Abrams

= Heuchera elegans =

Species of flowering plant

Heuchera elegans is a species of flowering plant in the saxifrage family known by the common name urn-flowered alumroot.

It is endemic to the San Gabriel Mountains of Southern California, where it grows on the rocky slopes.

Heuchera elegans is a rhizomatous perennial herb with multi-lobed leaves. It produces an erect, drooping inflorescence which bears bright pink or magenta bell-shaped flowers.

Cultivation

While uncommon in the wild, Heuchera elegans is cultivated as an ornamental plant for its attractive garden flower, and for wildlife gardens and natural landscaping.
