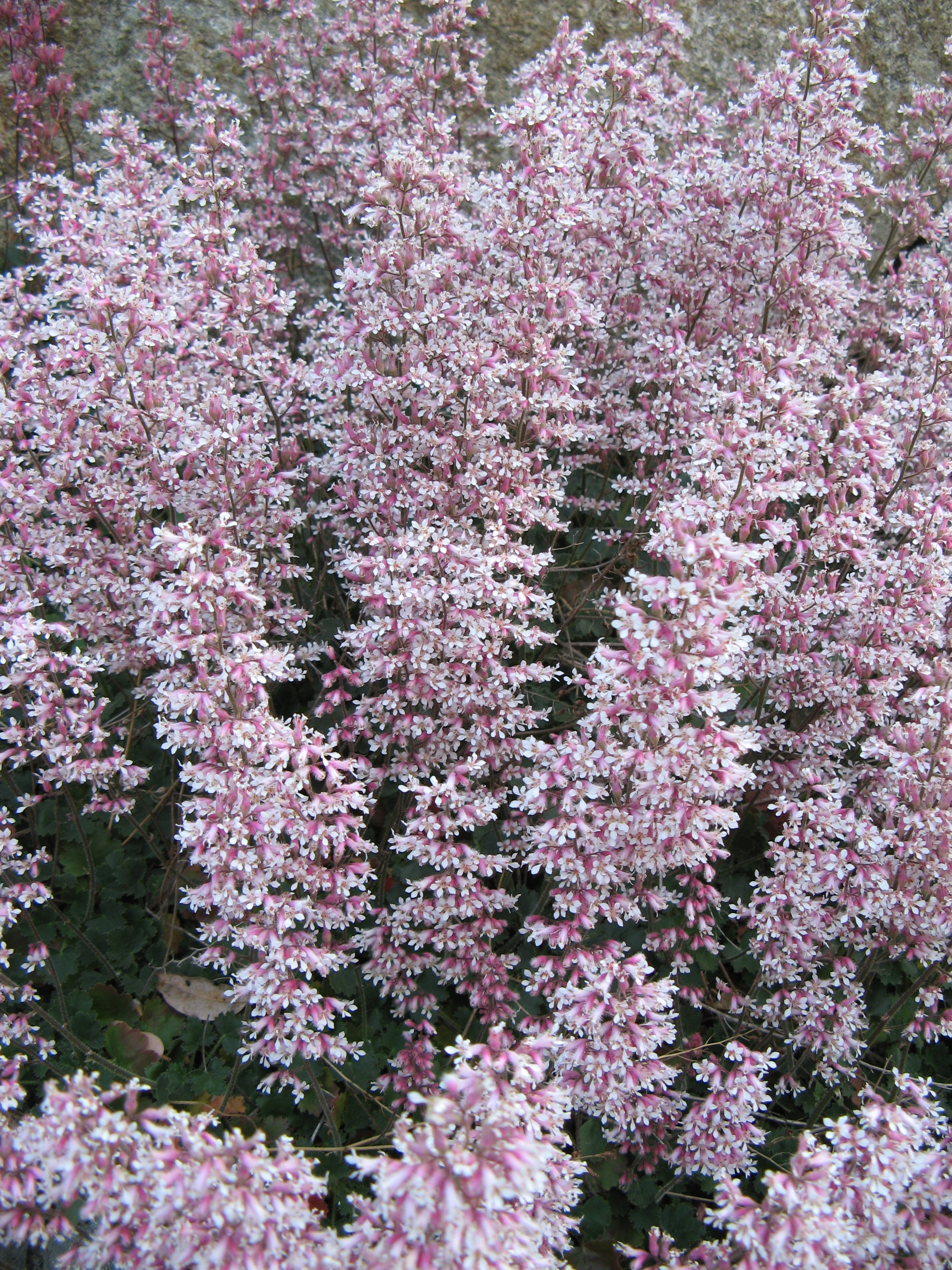
- Heuchera elegans on Mount Wilson in California

Scientific classification
- Kingdom: Plantae
- Clade: Embryophytes
- Clade: Tracheophytes
- Clade: Spermatophytes
- Clade: Angiosperms
- Clade: Eudicots
- Order: Saxifragales
- Family: Saxifragaceae
- Genus: Heuchera; L. (1753)

Type species
- Heuchera americana L.

Species
- 45; see text

Synonyms
- Holochloa Nutt. (1840); Oreanthus Raf. (1830); Oreotrys Raf. (1832); Yamala Raf. (1837)

= Heuchera =

Genus of flowering plants

Heuchera (/ˈhjuːkɪrə/ HEW-kih-rə or /ˈhɔɪkərə/ HOY-kih-rə) is a genus of largely evergreen perennial plants in the family Saxifragaceae. All species are native to North America except for Heuchera sichotensis, native to the Russian Far East. Common names include alumroot and coral bells.

== Description ==
Heuchera have palmately lobed leaves on long petioles, and a thick, woody rootstock. The genus was named after Johann Heinrich von Heucher (1677–1746), an 18th-century German physician, and Professor at Wittenberg University. There are approximately 37 species, but the taxonomy of the genus is difficult because the species often intergrade with one another, hybridization is common, and the flowers change markedly in proportion as they develop.

== Distribution and habitat ==
Alumroot species grow in varied habitats, so some species look quite different from one another, and have varying preferences regarding temperature, soil, and other natural factors. H. maxima is found on the Channel Islands of California, where it grows on rocky, windy, saline-washed ocean shores, and H. sanguinea, called coral bells because of its cerise flowers, can be found in the warm, dry canyons of Mexico and adjacent New Mexico and Arizona. In the Mid-Atlantic region of the United States, the plants grow best in shade.

Several alumroots and their crosses are used as ornamental plants.

== Uses ==
Native American peoples used some Heuchera species medicinally. The Tlingit used H. glabra as an herbal remedy for inflammation of the testicles caused by syphilis. To the Navajo, H. novamexicana was a panacea and a pain reliever. The roots of H. cylindrica had a variety of medicinal uses among the Blackfoot, Flathead, Kutenai, Okanagan, Colville, and Shuswap.

== Cultivation ==
The majority of Heuchera sold for gardens are hybrids of H. americana, such as 'Green Spice'. The original 'Purple Palace' discovered in a palace in England is believed to be a H. micrantha × H. villosa hybrid, which was then crossed with H. americana. Another group of hybrids are crosses of Heuchera with Tiarella treated under the name × Heucherella. Gardeners and horticulturists have developed a multitude of hybrids between various Heuchera species. There is an extensive array of blossom sizes, shapes, and colors, foliage types, and geographic tolerances. They are valued as foliage plants, producing rosettes of leaves in shades of green, pink and bronze, often variegated or textured; with long thyrses of white, green, pink or red flowers in spring.

The following cultivars have gained the Royal Horticultural Society's Award of Garden Merit:-

- 'Blackberry Jam'
- 'Can-Can'
- 'Green Spice'
- 'Lime Marmalade'
- 'Magic Wand'
- 'Marmalade'
- 'Obsidian'
- 'Purple Petticoats'
- 'Regina'
- 'Sashay'
- 'Walnut' (Fox series)

== Species ==
45 species are accepted.

- Heuchera abramsii Rydb. – San Gabriel alumroot
- Heuchera acutifolia Rose
- Heuchera alba Rydb. – white alumroot
- Heuchera americana L. – American alumroot
- Heuchera bracteata (Torr.) Ser. – Rocky Mountain alumroot
- Heuchera brevistaminea Wiggins – Laguna Mountain alumroot
- Heuchera caespitosa Eastw. – tufted alumroot
- Heuchera caroliniana (Rosend., Butters & Lakela) E.F.Wells – Carolina alumroot
- Heuchera chlorantha Piper – green-flowered alumroot
- Heuchera cylindrica Douglas – roundleaf alumroot, lava alumroot
- Heuchera × easthamii Calder & Savile
- Heuchera eastwoodiae Rosend., Butters & Lakela – Senator Mine alumroot
- Heuchera elegans Abrams – urnflower alumroot
- Heuchera folkii Engle-Wrye
- Heuchera glabra Willd. ex Schult. – alpine alumroot
- Heuchera glomerulata Rosend., Butters & Lakela – Chiricahua Mountain alumroot
- Heuchera grossulariifolia Rydb. – gooseberryleaf alumroot
- Heuchera hallii A.Gray – Front Range alumroot
- Heuchera hirsutissima Rosend., Butters & Lakela – shaggy-haired alumroot
- Heuchera inconstans R.A.Folk
- Heuchera lakelae R.A.Folk
- Heuchera longiflora Rydb. – longflower alumroot
- Heuchera longipetala Moc. ex Ser.
- Heuchera maxima Greene – island alumroot, jill-of-the-rocks
- Heuchera merriamii Eastw. – Merriam's alumroot
- Heuchera mexicana J.H.Schaffn.
- Heuchera micrantha Douglas – crevice alumroot, smallflower alumroot
- Heuchera missouriensis Rosend.
- Heuchera novomexicana Wheelock – New Mexico alumroot, range alumroot
- Heuchera parishii Rydb. – Mill Creek alumroot
- Heuchera parviflora Bartl. – littleflower alumroot
- Heuchera parvifolia Nutt. – littleleaf alumroot, common alumroot
- Heuchera pilosissima Fisch. & C.A.Mey. – seaside alumroot
- Heuchera puberula Mack. & Bush.
- Heuchera pubescens Pursh – downy alumroot
- Heuchera pulchella Wooton & Standl. – Sandia Mountain alumroot
- Heuchera richardsonii R.Br. – Richardson's alumroot
- Heuchera rosendahlii R.A.Folk
- Heuchera rubescens Torr. – pink alumroot, red alumroot, jack-o'the-rocks
- Heuchera sanguinea Engelm. – coral bells
- Heuchera sichotensis (Gorovoj & N.S.Pavlova) Zhmylev
- Heuchera soltisii R.A.Folk & P.J.Alexander
- Heuchera villosa Michx. – hairy alumroot, maple-leaved alumroot
- Heuchera wellsiae R.A.Folk
- Heuchera woodsiaphila P.J.Alexander
- Heuchera wootonii Rydb. – White Mountain alumroot

Hybrids include:

- Heuchera × brizoides

== Gallery ==
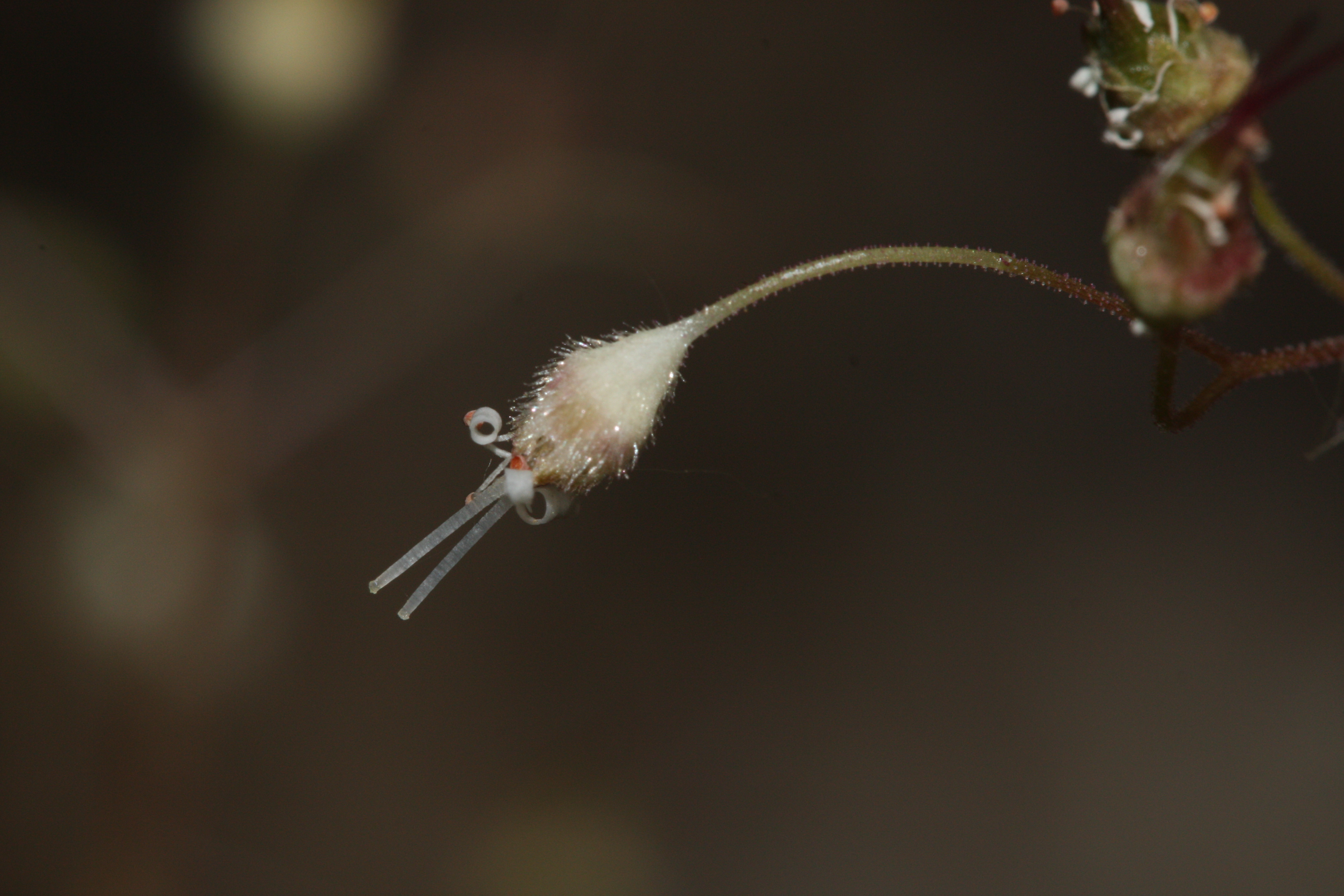
H. micrantha var. diversifolia

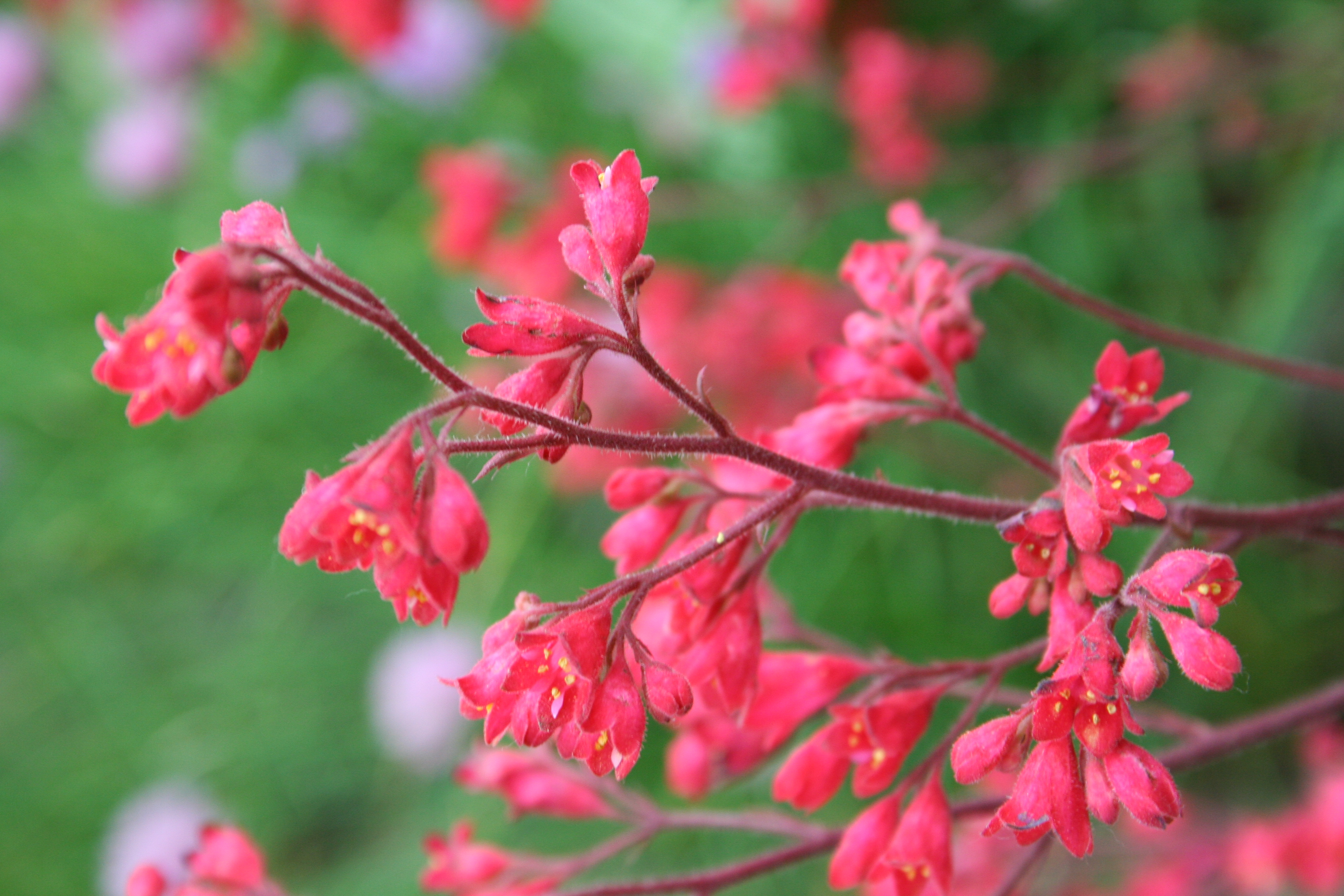
Heuchera × brizoides

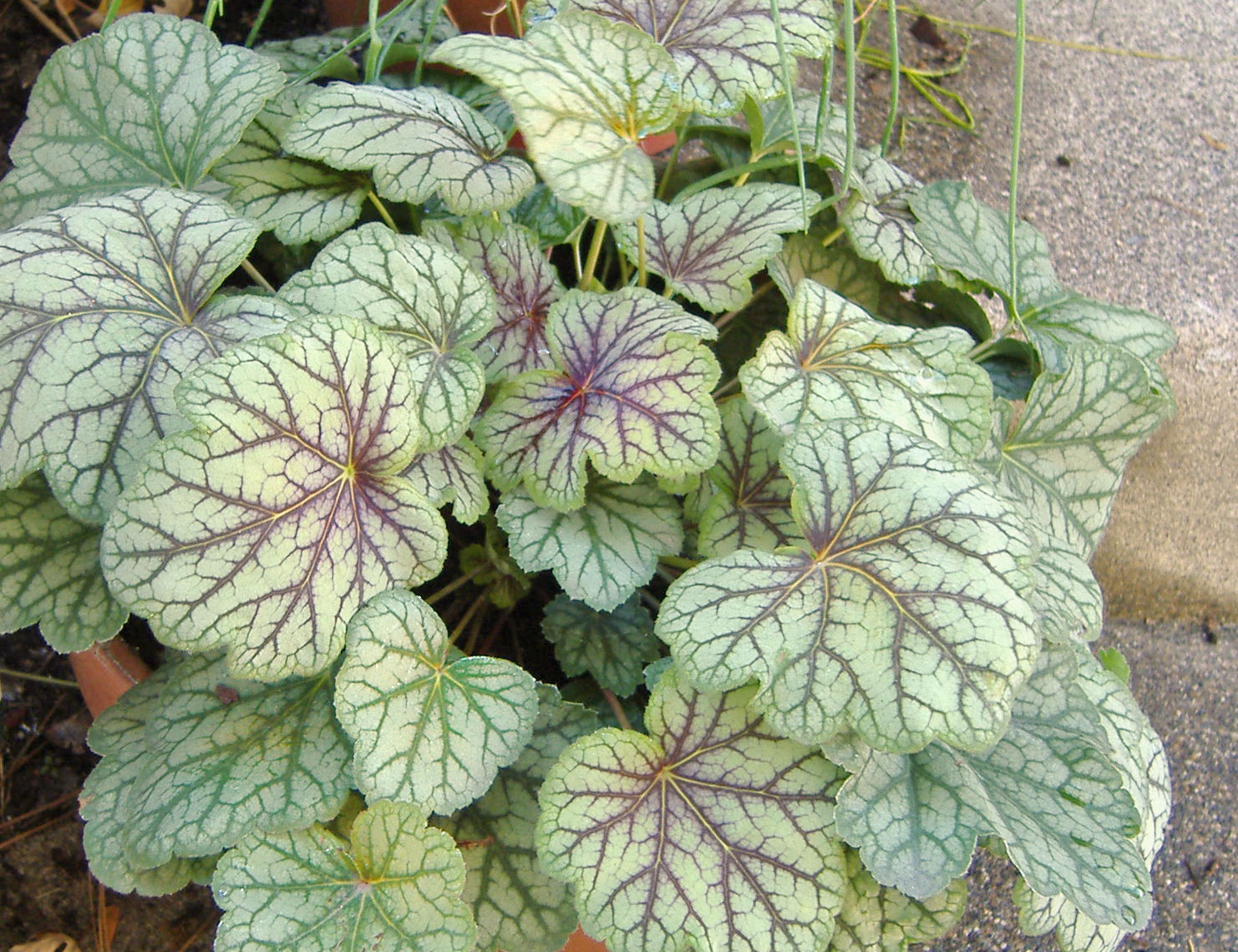
H. americana 'Green Spice'

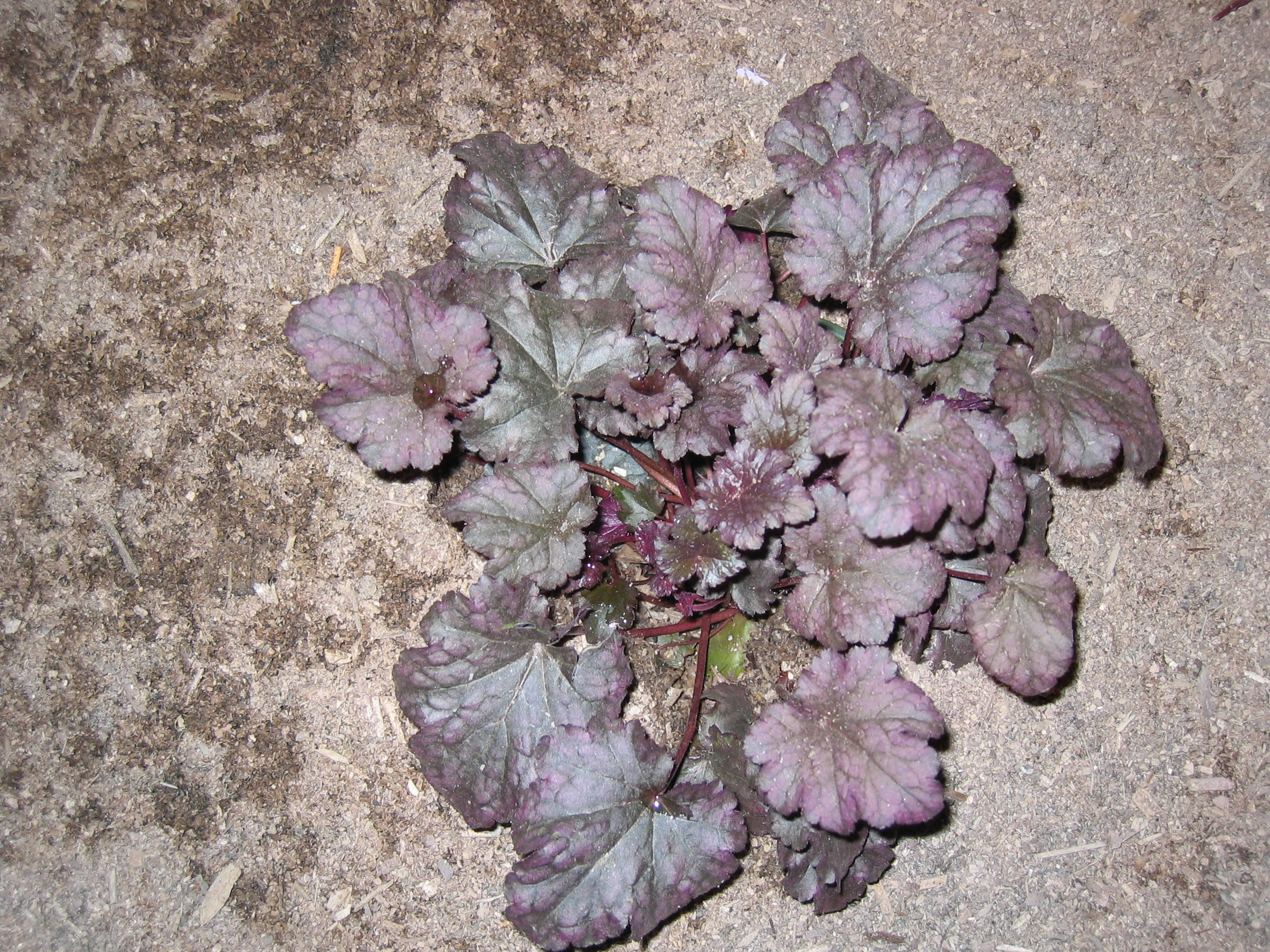
Heuchera 'Starry Night'

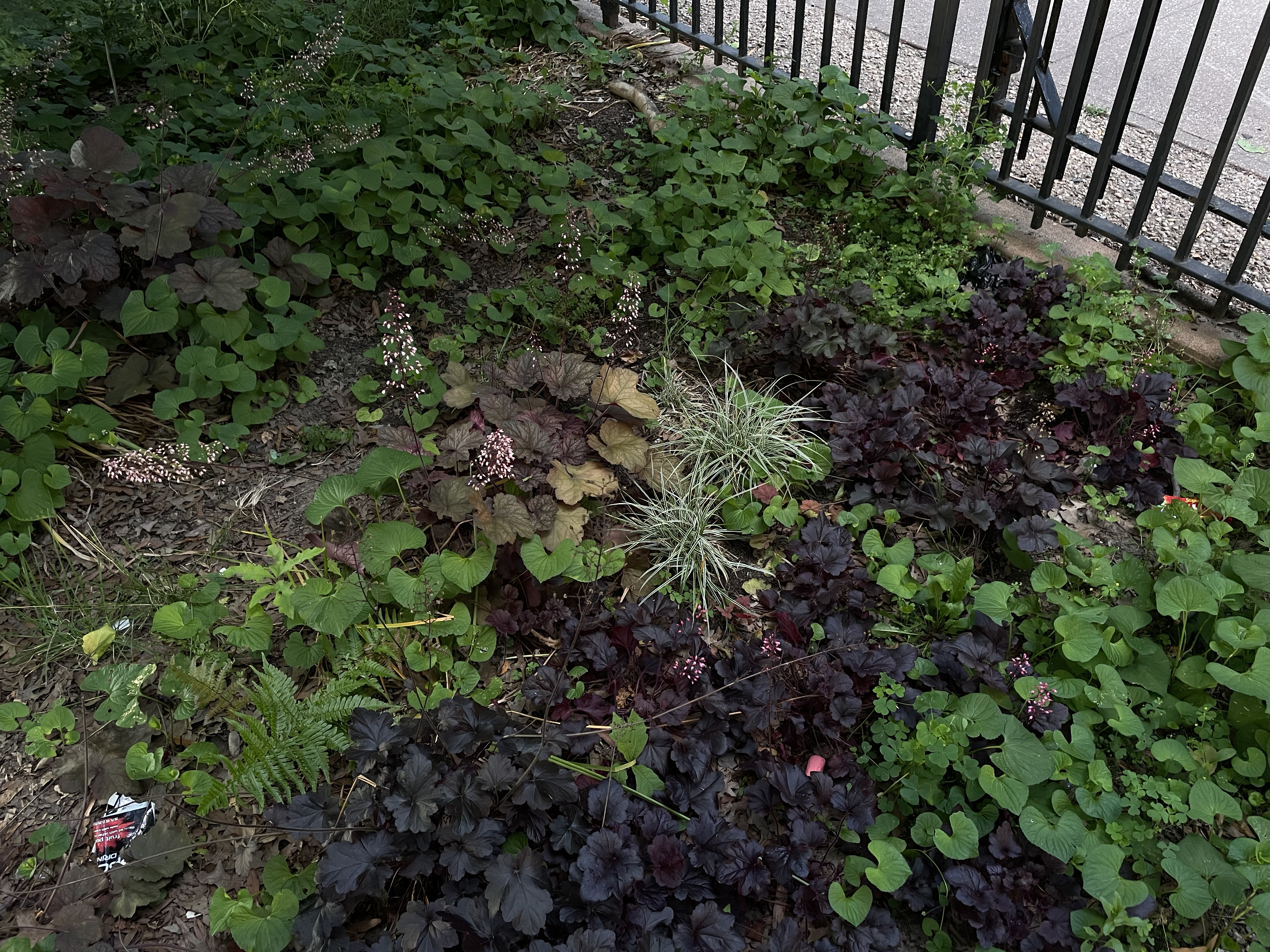
Obsidian Heuchera
