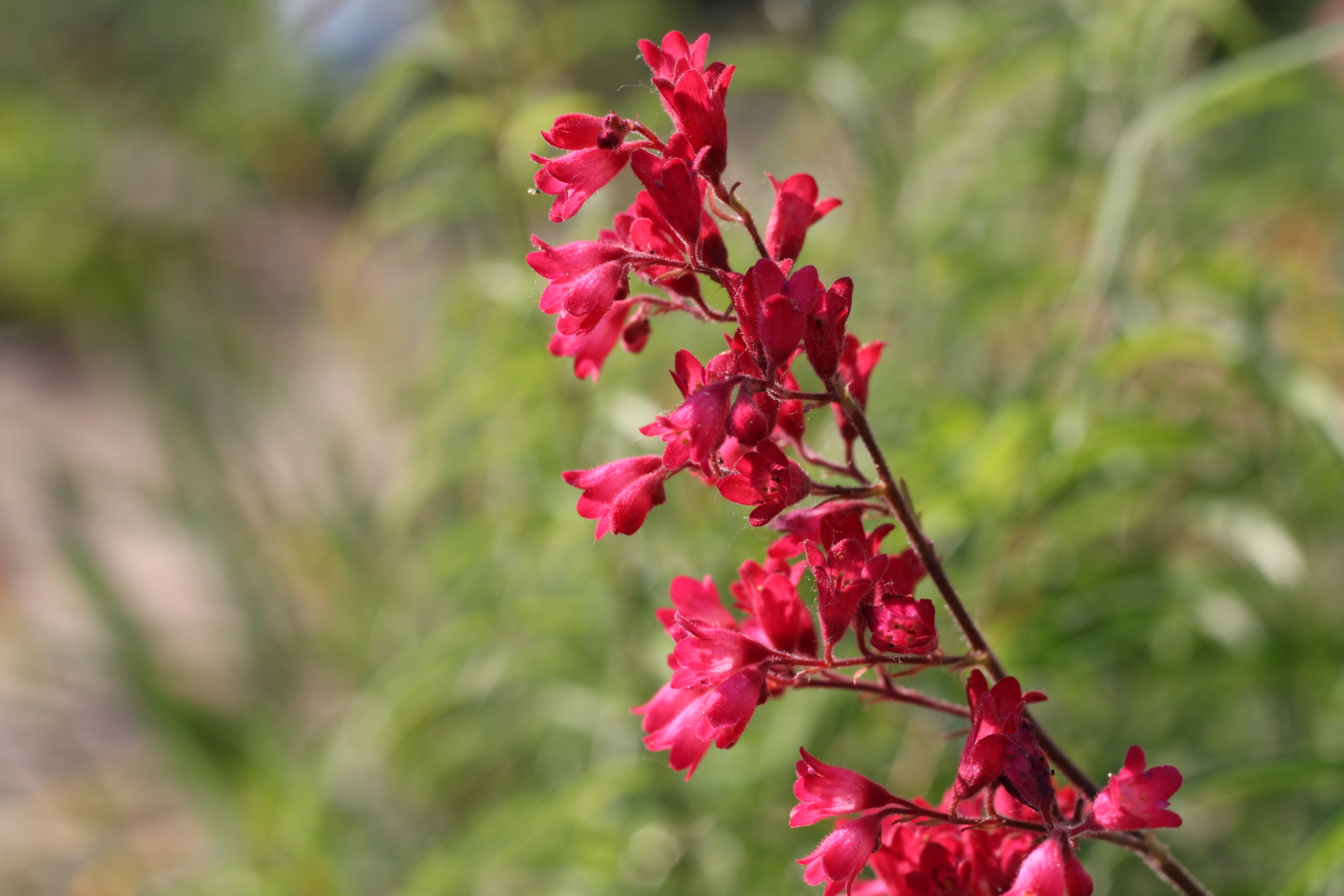
- Flowers
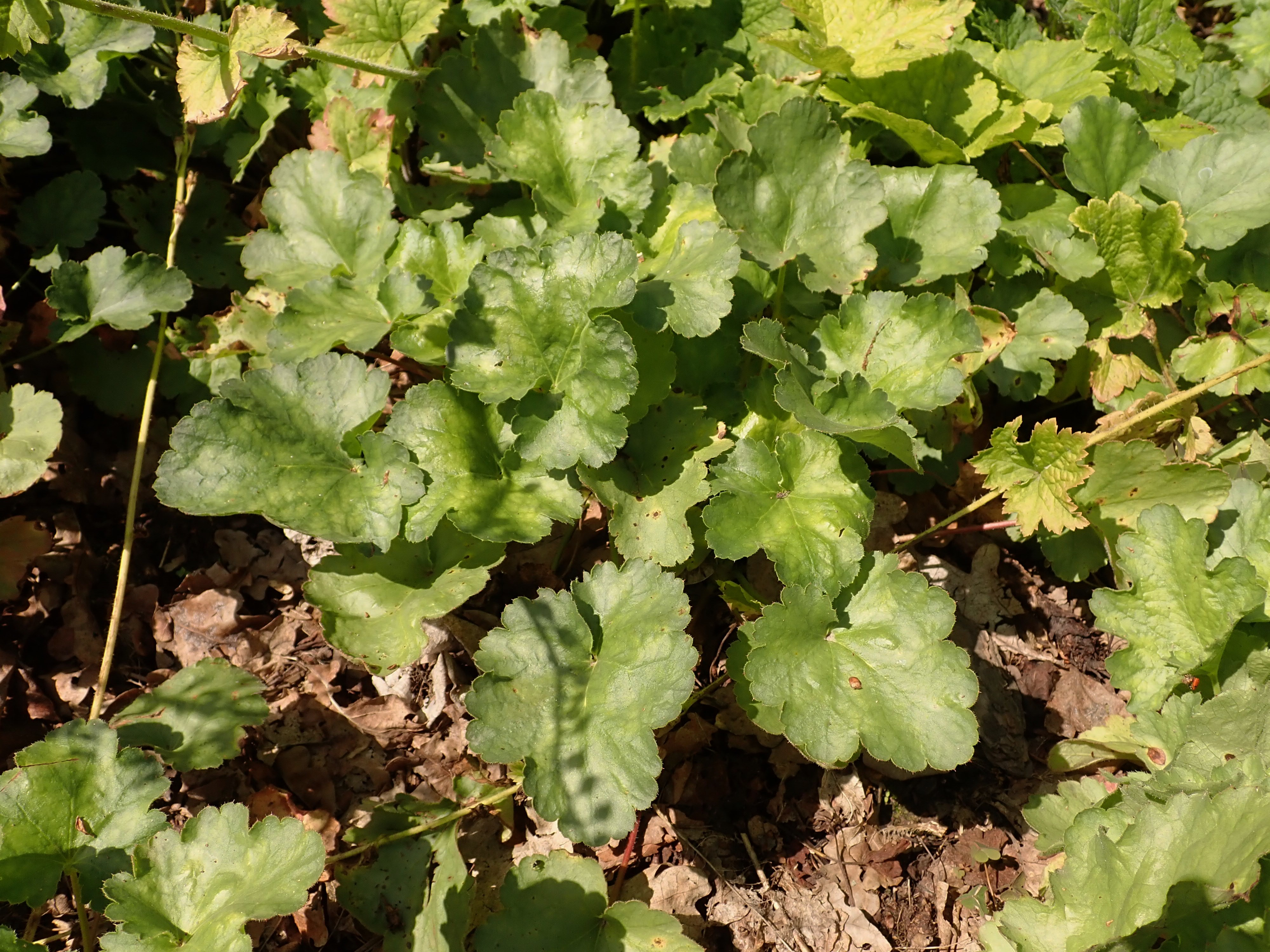
- Leaves

Scientific classification
- Kingdom: Plantae
- Clade: Embryophytes
- Clade: Tracheophytes
- Clade: Spermatophytes
- Clade: Angiosperms
- Clade: Eudicots
- Order: Saxifragales
- Family: Saxifragaceae
- Genus: Heuchera
- Species: H. sanguinea

Binomial name
- Heuchera sanguinea Engelm.

Synonyms
- List: Heuchera pulchra Rydb.; Heuchera sanguinea f. hirtella Rosend., Butters & Lakela; Heuchera sanguinea var. pulchra (Rydb.) Rosend.; Heuchera sanguinea var. typica Rosend., Butters & Lakela; Heuchera townsendii Rydb.

= Heuchera sanguinea =

Species of flowering plant

Heuchera sanguinea, called coral bells, is a species of flowering plant in the genus Heuchera, native to the US states of Arizona and New Mexico, and to northern Mexico. A number of cultivars are commercially available. The Latin specific epithet sanguinea means blood-red, in reference to the color of the flowers. Flowers are deep pink to red, sweetly fragrant, and bell-shaped. Heuchera sanguinea is a perennial herb. The plant attracts bees and hummingbirds.

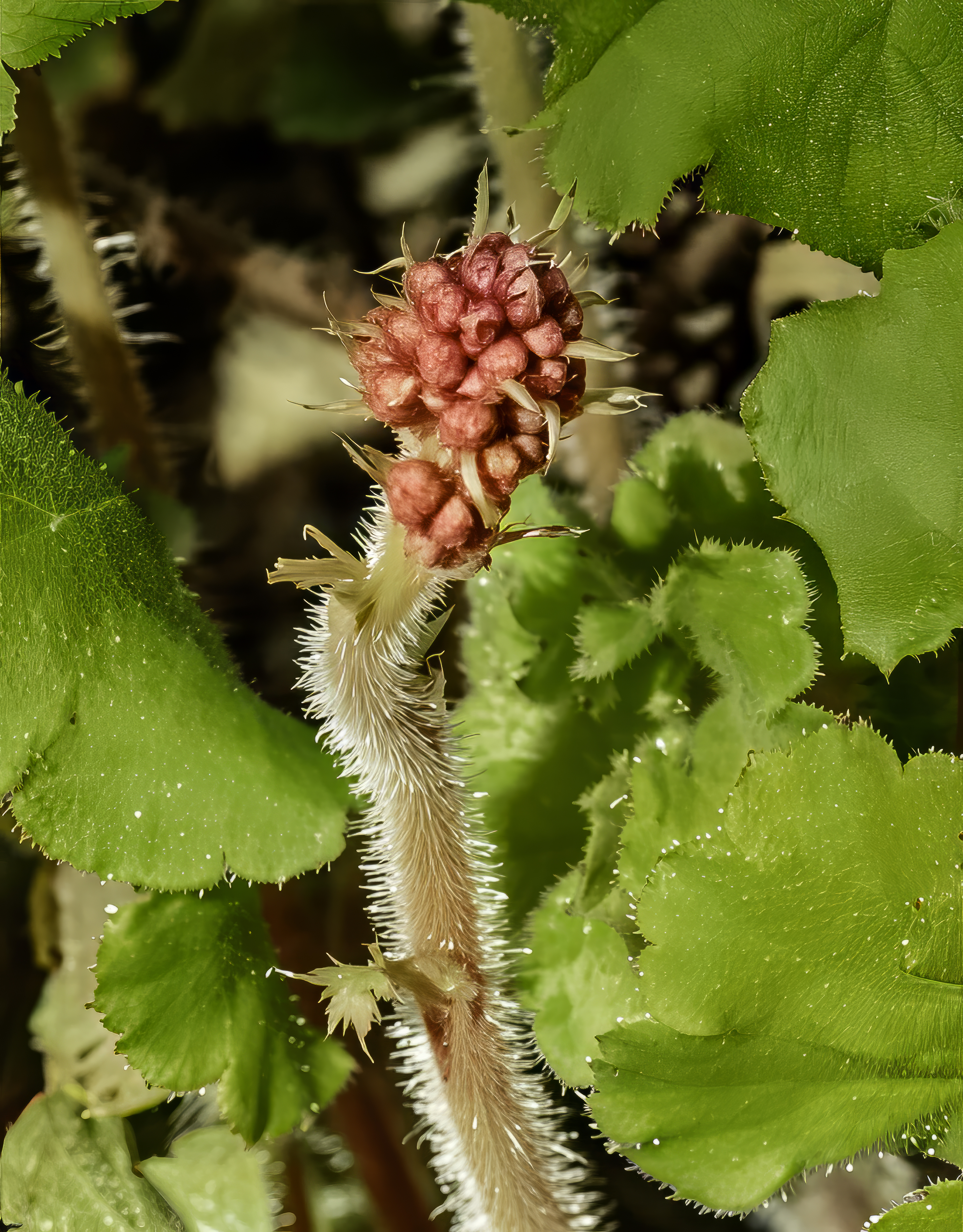
Heuchera sanguinea - Immature inflorescence

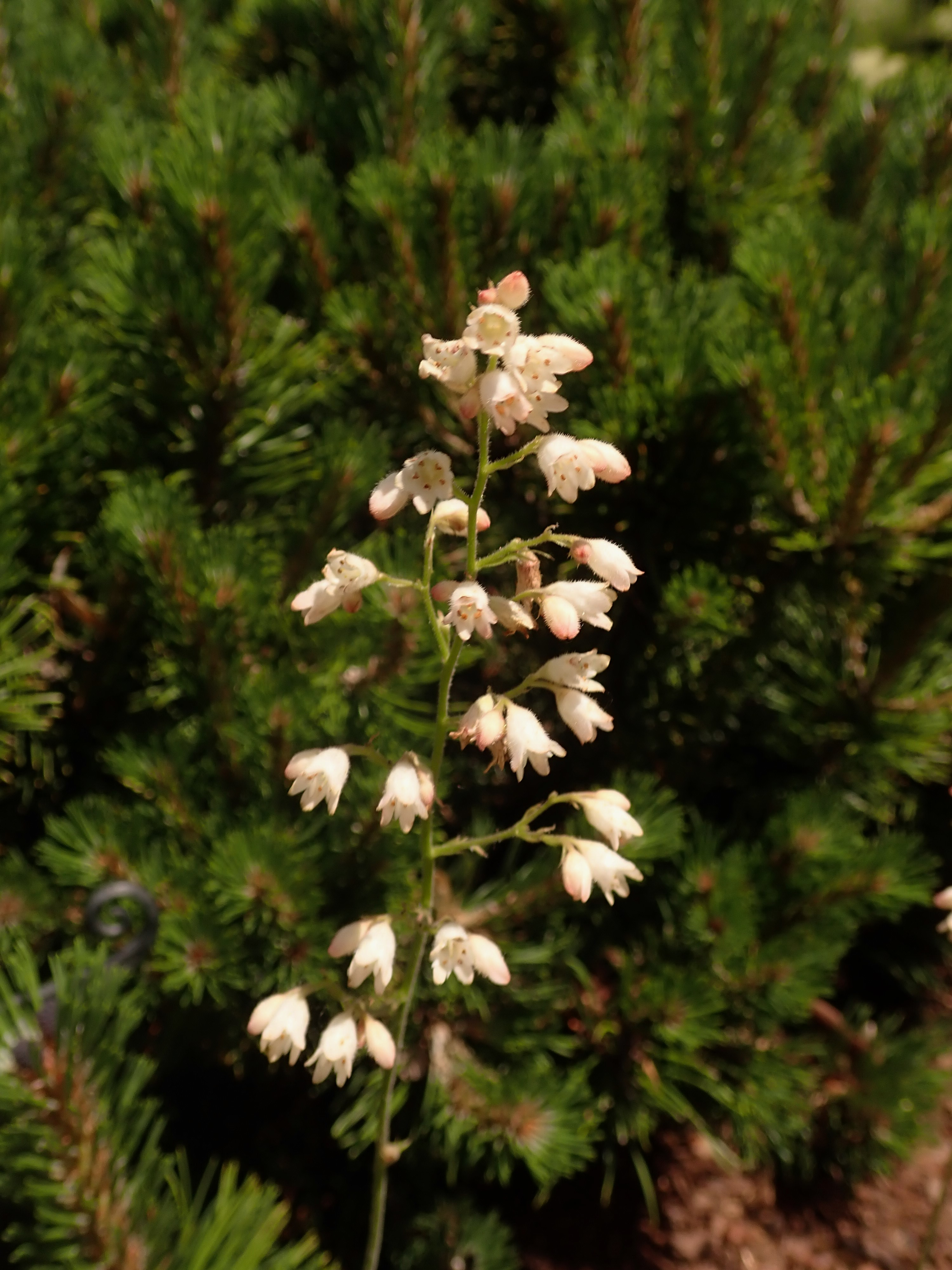
'Alba' cultivar

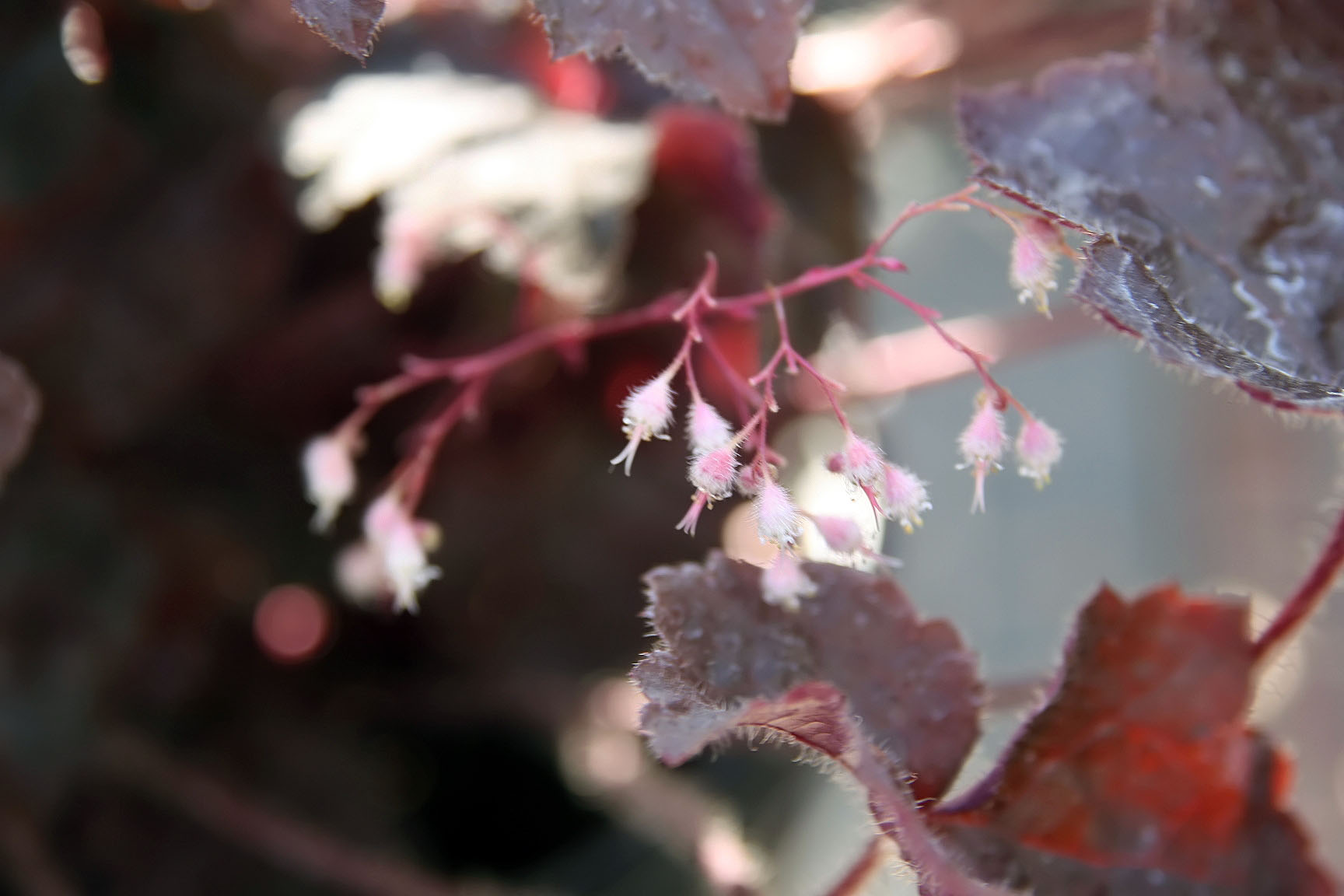
'Bressingham Bronze' cultivar

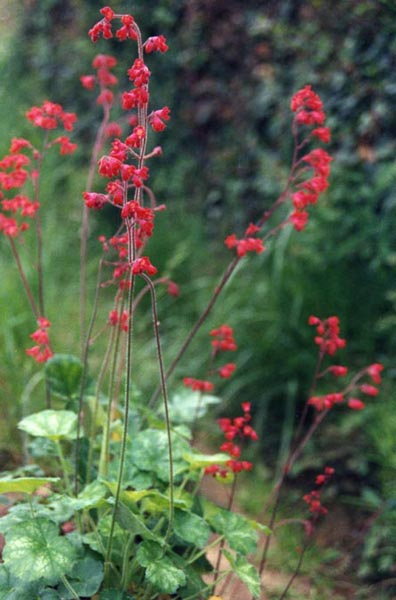
'Firefly' cultivar

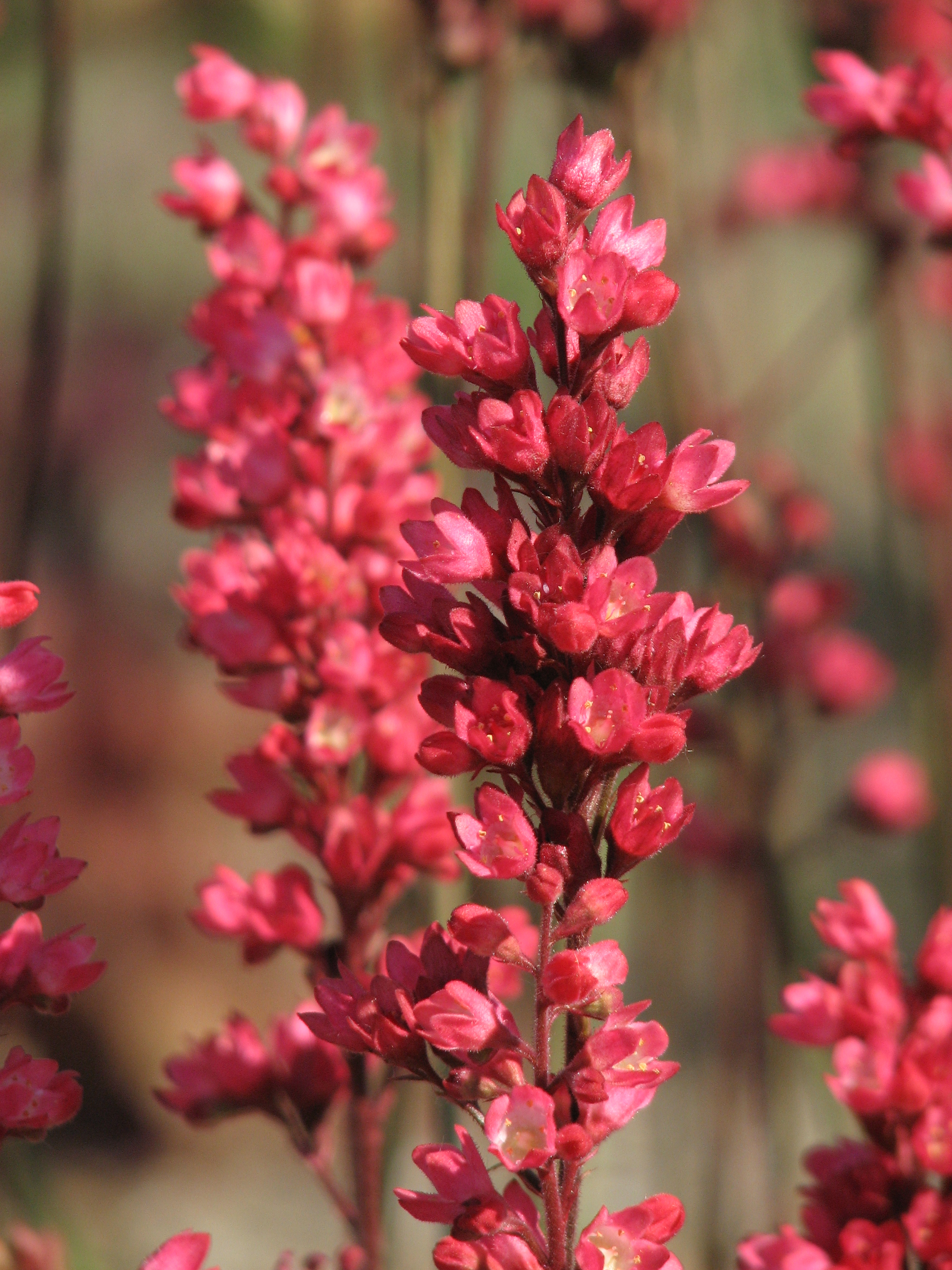
'Kale Beauty' cultivar

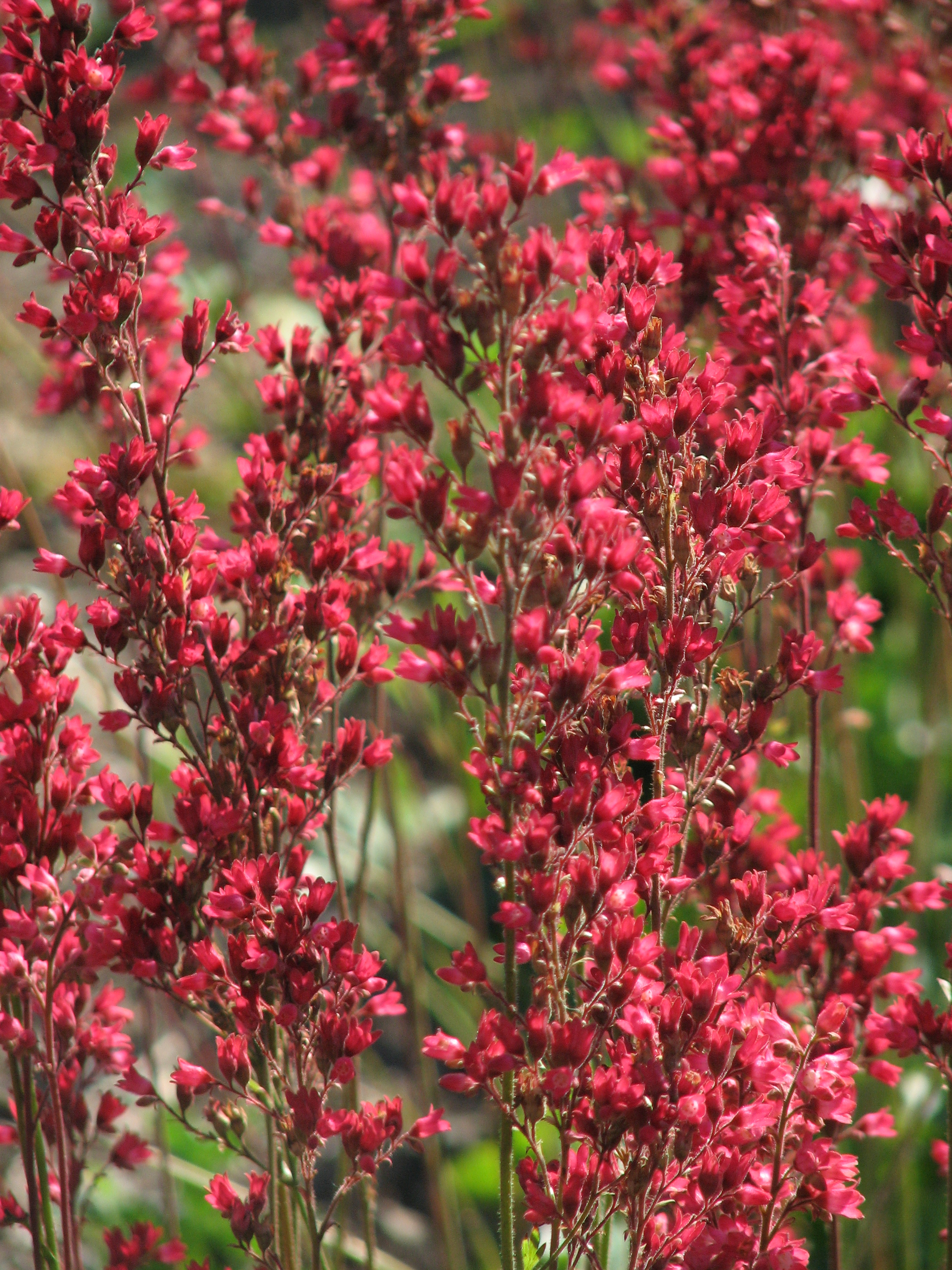
'Rocket' cultivar

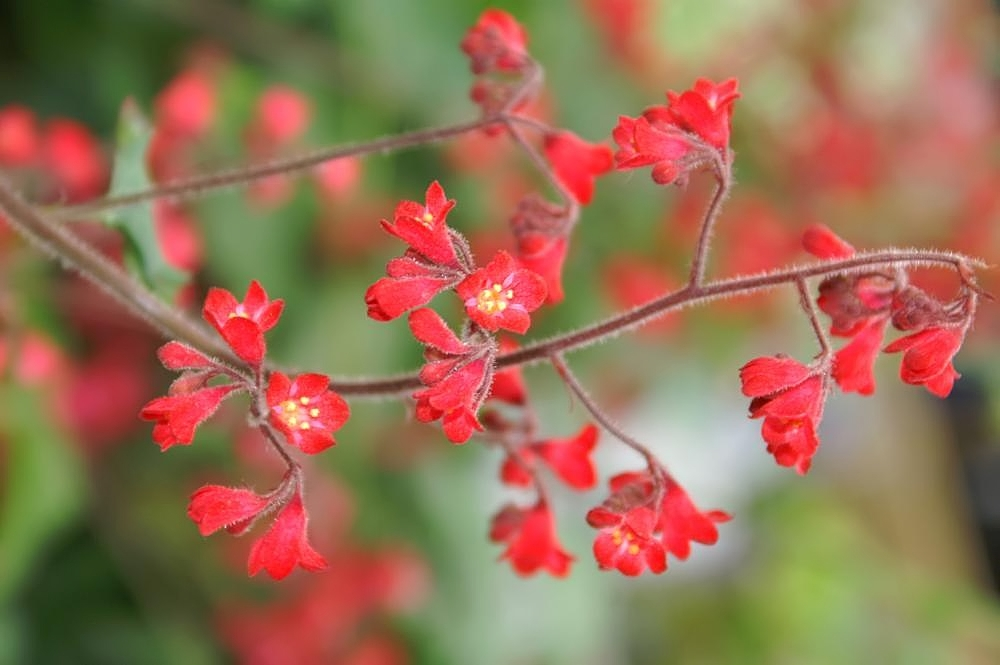
'Ruby Bells' cultivar
