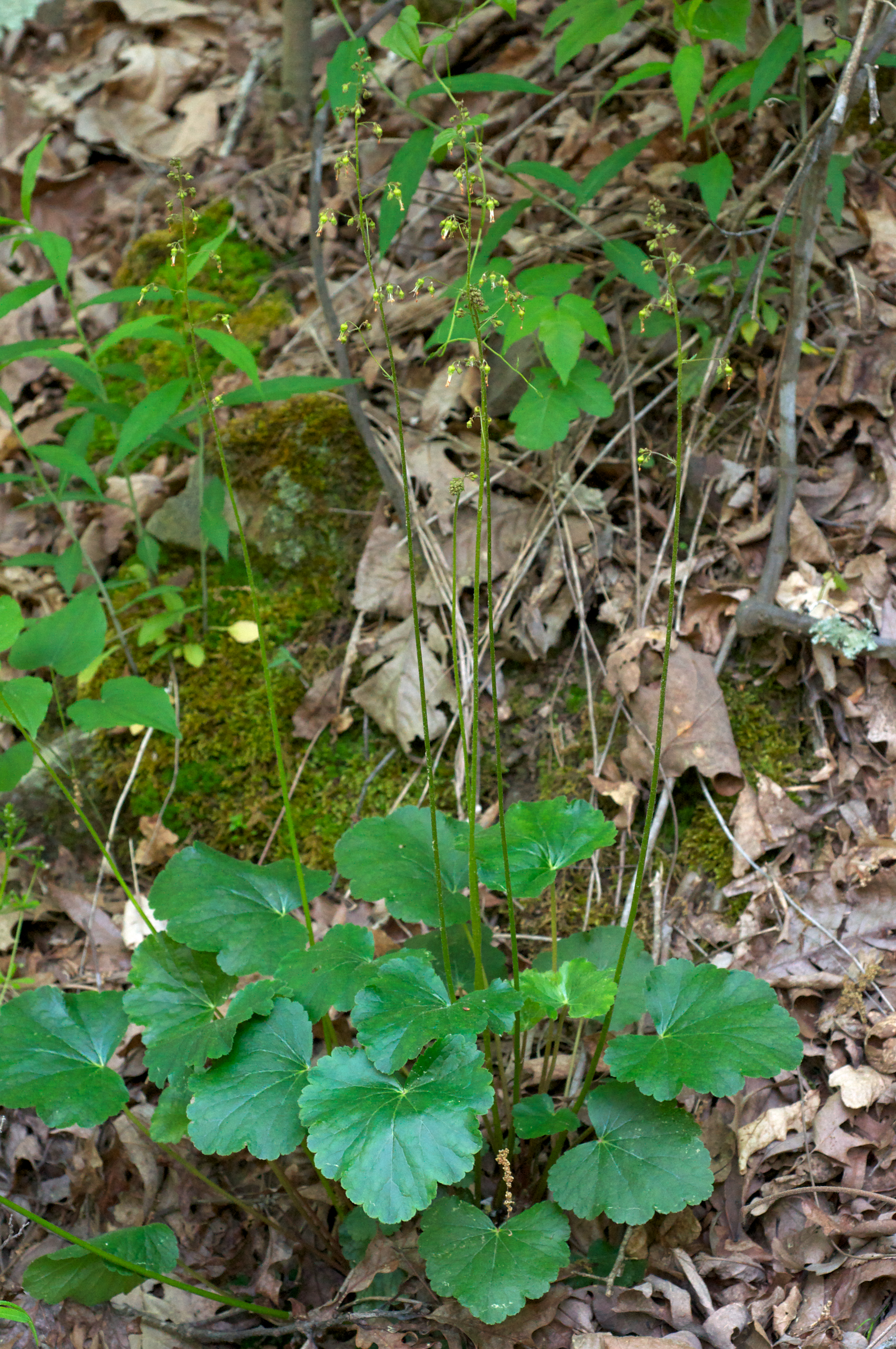

Scientific classification
- Kingdom: Plantae
- Clade: Embryophytes
- Clade: Tracheophytes
- Clade: Spermatophytes
- Clade: Angiosperms
- Clade: Eudicots
- Order: Saxifragales
- Family: Saxifragaceae
- Genus: Heuchera
- Species: H. americana

Binomial name
- Heuchera americana L.

= Heuchera americana =

Species of flowering plant

Heuchera americana, or American alumroot (also called Coral bells or Rock geranium), is a small evergreen perennial, under 2 ft (0.61 m) high and wide, native to eastern and central North America while also ranging into Ontario, Canada. It is a part of the Saxifrage family.

== Characteristics ==
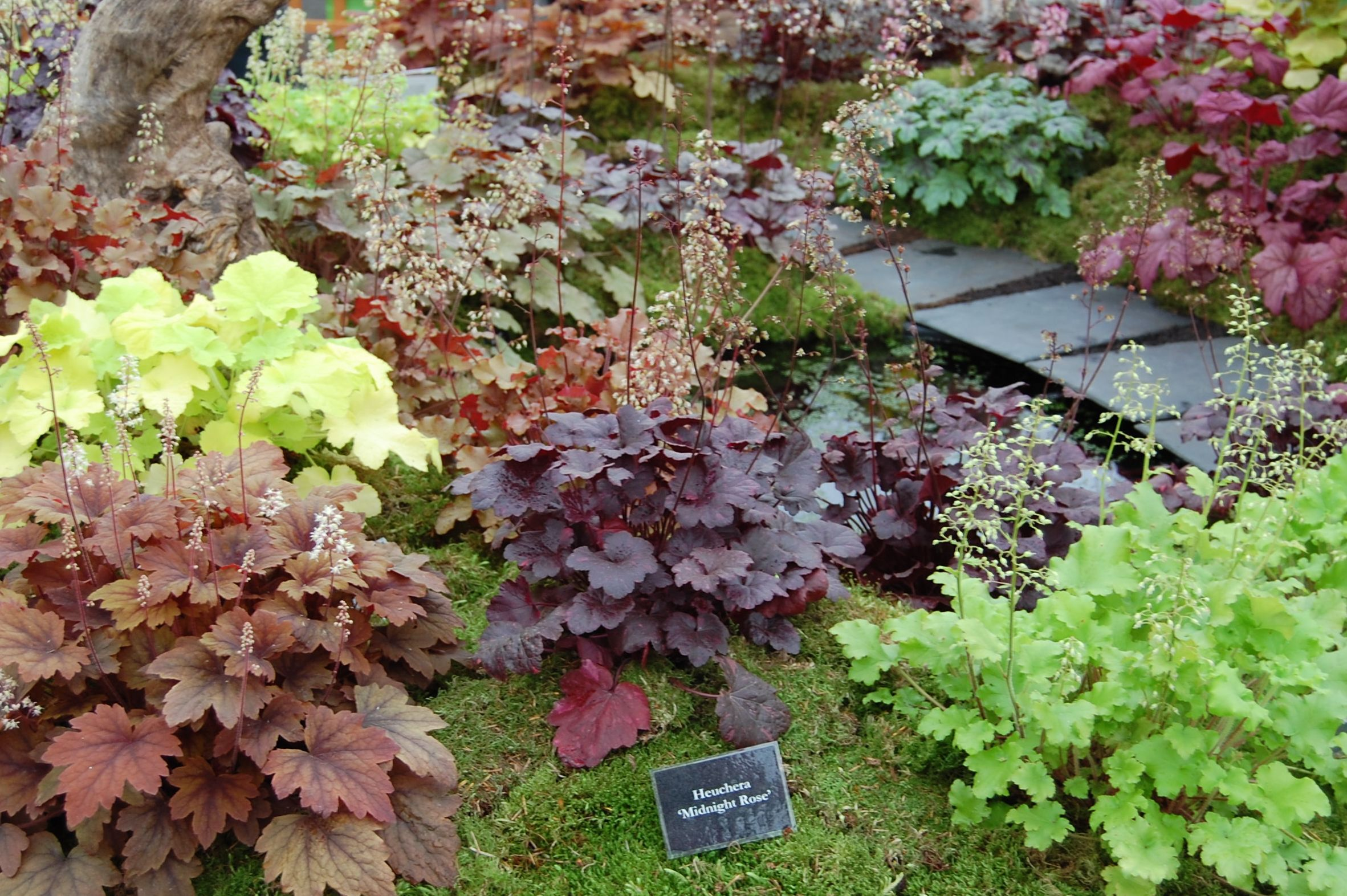
Heuchera cultivars at the BBC Gardeners' World show in June 2011, with 'Midnight Rose' in the center.

American alumroot has lobed semi-palmate green, purple, or brown leaves that may or may not be veined or marbled. Loose racemes of insignificant green to cream flowers up to 1 m (3 ft 3 in) tall bloom June to August. It is a monecious plant with 5 stamen and can either have 5 petals and sepals or 5 tepals. The leaf arrangement is alternate. It is a ground cover plant. Found naturally in rock crevices and ledges of bluffs; it has a preference for acidic soil. It is susceptible to leaf scorch making it best grown in areas with at least some shade.

This species has become popular with horticulturists and home-gardeners. It is usually grown for its unique foliage. New varieties are introduced regularly.

== Historical usage ==
American alumroot has been used by many Indigenous tribes in the past. For example, The Lumbee have used the herb to treat things like gastroenteritis, sore throats, ulcers, and dysentery while the Cherokee used American Alumroot to treat hemorrhoids, mouth soreness, irregular menstruation, and gastrointestinal problems.

== Current usage ==
The American alumroot has a lot of tannin which makes it very astringent and good for fixing dyes.

The American Alumroot has been proposed to help with cancer and vaginal discharges, but this connection has not been thoroughly researched. Its side effects are reported to be irritation of the stomach, and kidney and liver failure

== Gallery ==
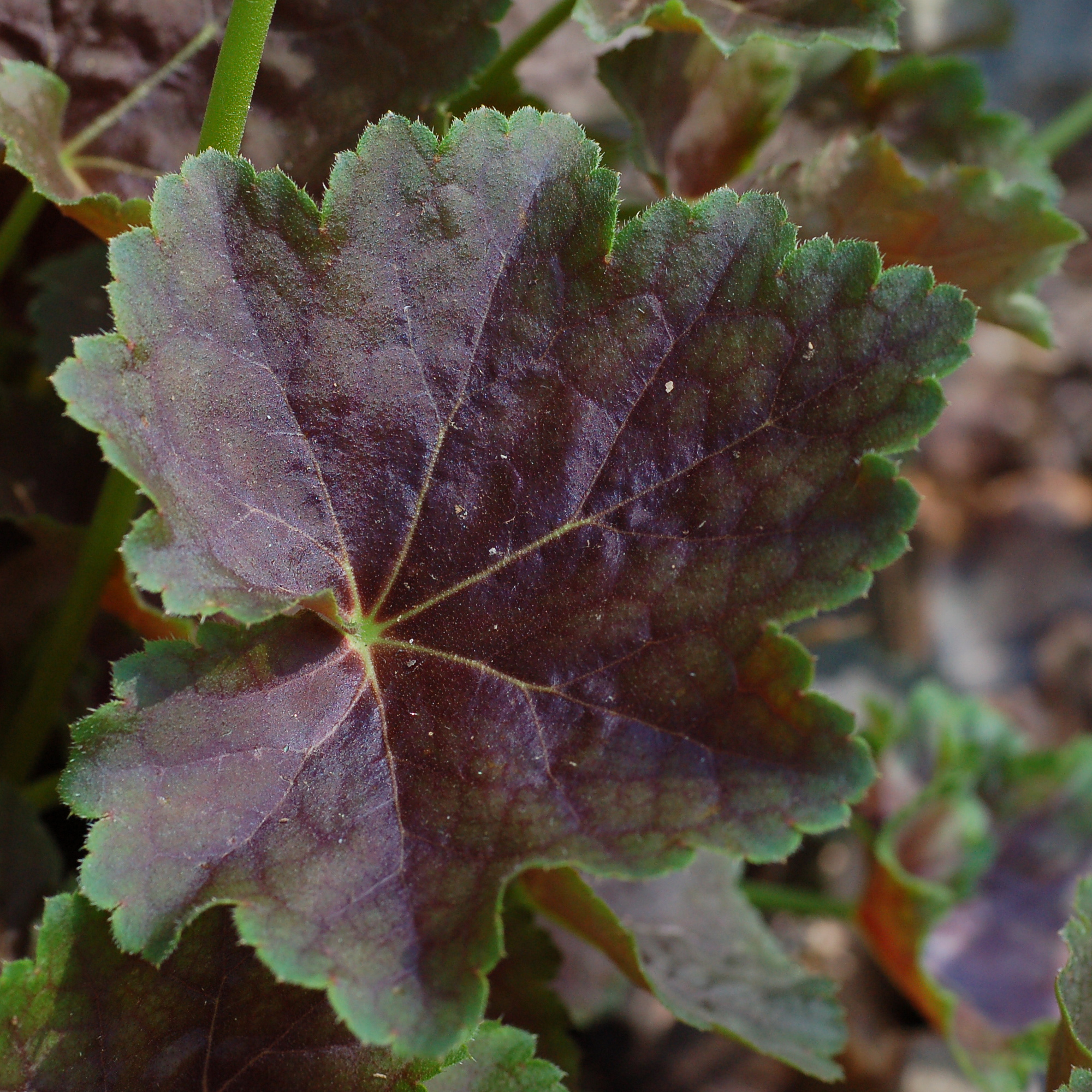
Heuchera americana 'Garnet' leaf

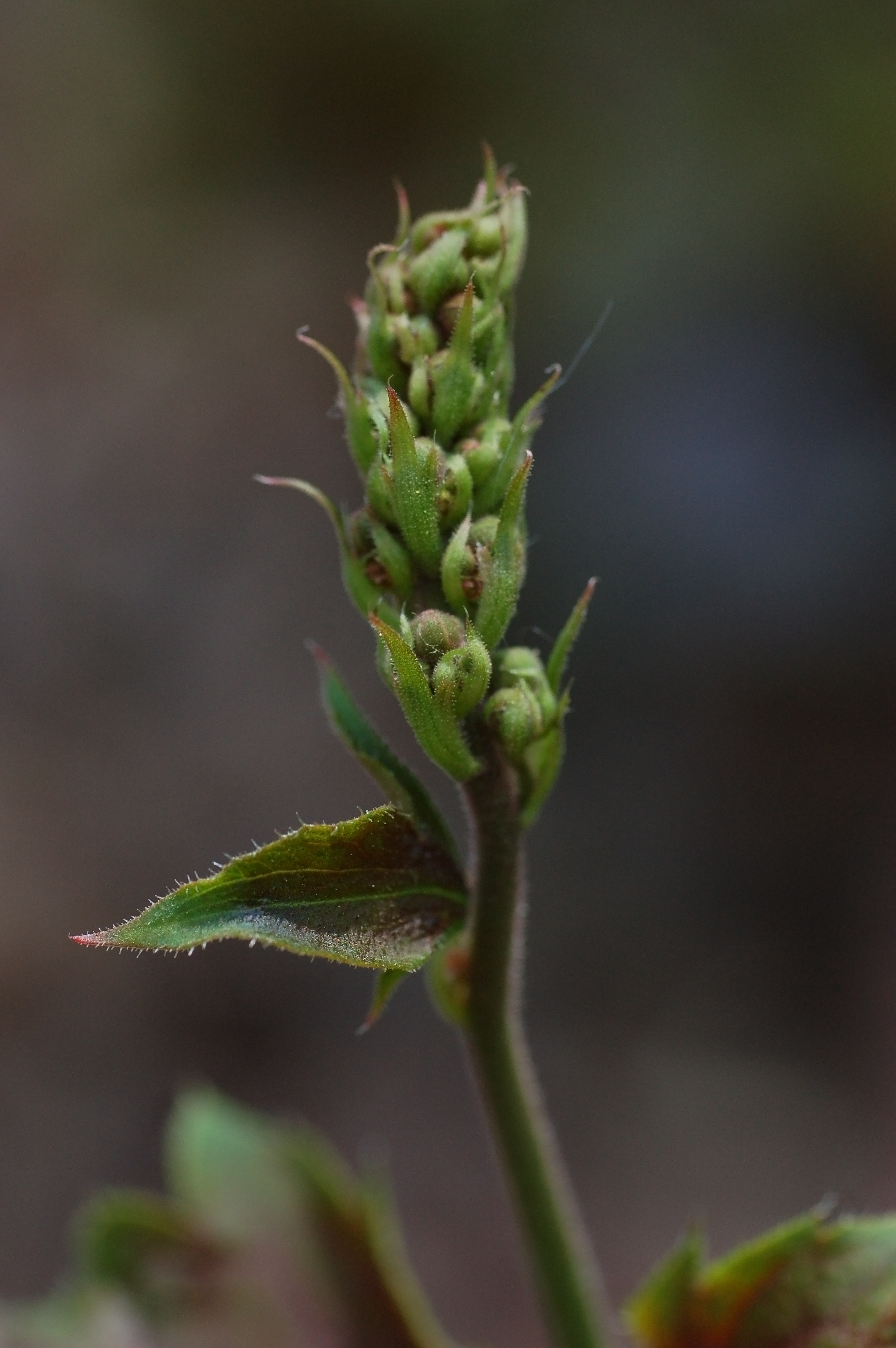
Heuchera americana 'Garnet' emerging flower stalk
