= Laceflower =

Laceflower is a common name for several plants and may refer to:

- Ammi majus
- Daucus carota
- Orlaya sp.
- Ptilimnium nuttallii
- Tiarella trifoliata
