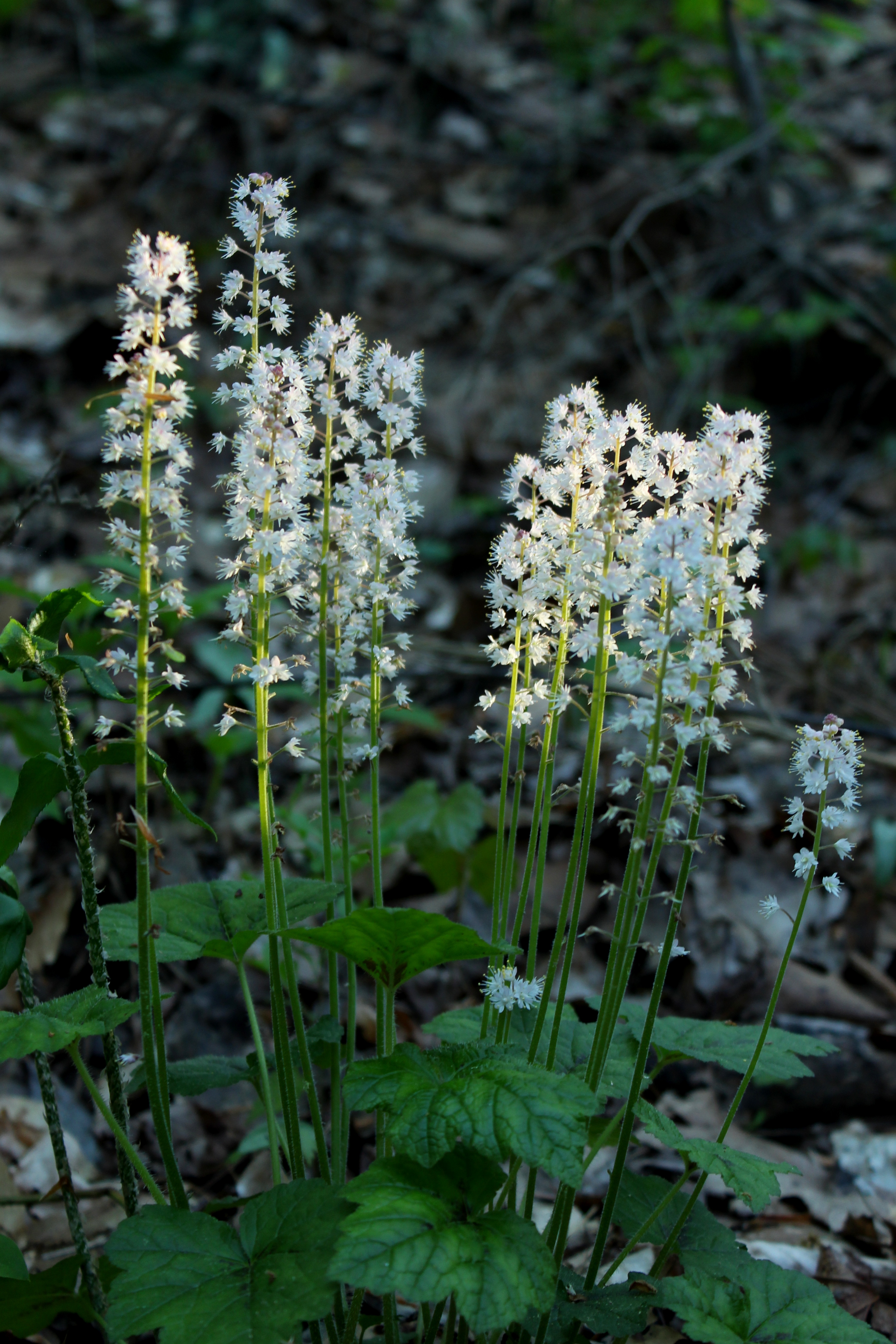
- Uwharrie National Forest, North Carolina, USA (16 April)

Scientific classification
- Kingdom: Plantae
- Clade: Tracheophytes
- Clade: Angiosperms
- Clade: Eudicots
- Order: Saxifragales
- Family: Saxifragaceae
- Genus: Tiarella
- Species: T. cordifolia

Binomial name
- Tiarella cordifolia L.

Synonyms
- T. cordifolia s.s.: Tiarella cordifolia var. collina Wherry; Tiarella cordifolia f. subaequalis Lakela; Tiarella cordifolia f. tridentata Lakela

= Tiarella cordifolia =

Species of flowering plant

Tiarella cordifolia, the heart-leaved foamflower, is a species of flowering plant in the family Saxifragaceae. The specific name cordifolia means "with heart-shaped leaves", a characteristic shared by all taxa of Tiarella in eastern North America. It is also referred to as Allegheny foamflower, false miterwort, and coolwort.

Historically, the name Tiarella cordifolia has referred to the one and only species of Tiarella in eastern North America, but in 2021, the species was split into multiple taxa, which caused the name to have a different meaning. For clarity, the qualified name Tiarella cordifolia sensu stricto (abbreviated s.s.) refers to the new taxon while Tiarella cordifolia sensu lato refers to the old taxon.

Tiarella cordifolia sensu lato is wide-ranging across eastern North America while Tiarella cordifolia sensu stricto is narrowly confined to the East Coast of the United States. Cultivars of Tiarella are valued in horticulture for their erect stems of foamy cream-colored flowers.

== Description ==
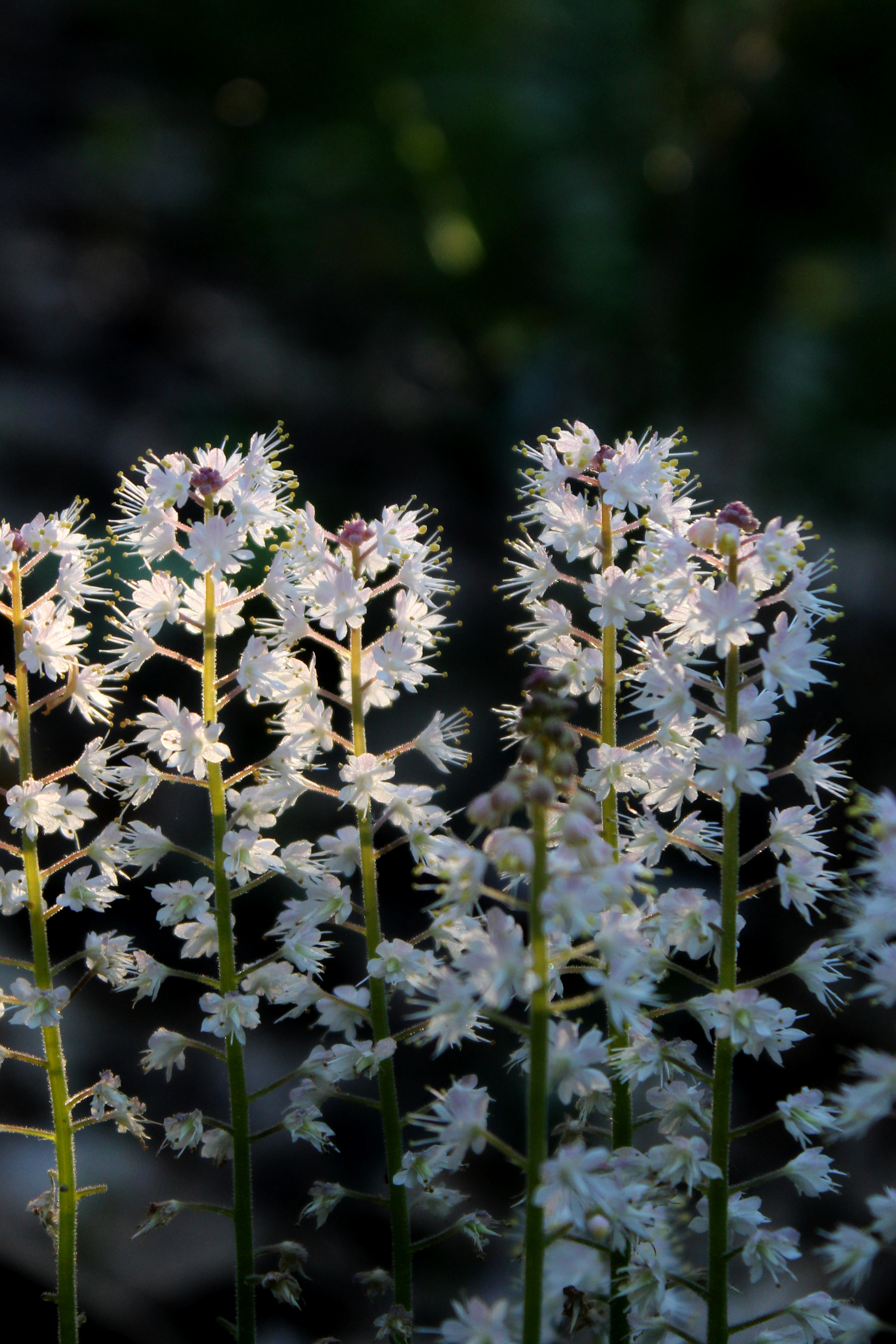
Inflorescence

Tiarella cordifolia sensu lato is a herbaceous, perennial plant with a scaly horizontal rhizome. The heart-shaped basal leaves have hairy stalks up to 20 cm (8 in) long. Both sides of the leaf blade have uniformly scattered hairs. The erect flowering stem is 15–40 cm (6–16 in) long, with a terminal raceme of 15–50 flowers. The flowers are white, small and feathery, giving the flower cluster a fuzzy appearance. Each flower has 5 sepals, 5 petals, and 10 long, slender stamens (which are longer than the petals). The two unequal seed capsules split along their inside seams, releasing several pitted seeds.

Some species of Tiarella produce leafy stolons (T. austrina, T. stolonifera) and some have stem leaves (T. nautila, T. austrina). Some species have relatively large basal leaves with an extended terminal lobe (T. austrina, T. nautila, T. wherryi). Tiarella cordifolia sensu stricto has none of these characteristics.

The heart-shaped basal leaves of Tiarella cordifolia sensu lato resemble those of species in other genera. For example, Tiarella is sometimes confused with Mitella diphylla, a closely related species that occurs over a similar range and habitat. If a plant lacks sufficient evidence of flowering, the orientation of the hairs on the basal leaf stalk may be used to distinguish the two species. All species of Tiarella in eastern North America have dense spreading hairs (outward-facing, angled 90 degrees) of various lengths while M. diphylla has long retrorse hairs (backward-facing, angled 45 degrees or less) sparsely distributed along its basal leaf stalk.

=== Identification ===
To positively identify Tiarella cordifolia sensu stricto, all of the following key features must be verified (in any order):

- Stolon always absent
- Basal leaves usually about as long as wide
- Basal leaf lobes usually obtuse to rounded with the terminal lobe not extended
- Flowering stem without leaves or foliaceous bracts

If the plant in question has a stolon, it is not Tiarella cordifolia sensu stricto. In that case, it is either Tiarella stolonifera or Tiarella austrina.

Except for the stolon, the key features listed above are identical to those of Tiarella stolonifera, so distinguishing the two species may be difficult. Also note that Tiarella cordifolia sensu stricto is similar to Tiarella wherryi, differing only in the basal leaves.

== Taxonomy ==
Tiarella cordifolia was first described by the Swedish botanist Carl Linnaeus in 1753. Linnaeus had two specimens at his disposal when he described the species, and so initially the type specimen was ambiguous. It remained that way until 1991, when one of the specimens was designated as the lectotype of the species. The lectotype was collected by John Clayton in northeastern Virginia but the precise date of the collection is unknown. In 1738, Linnaeus incorrectly cited the lectotype as "Mitella scapo nudo" in Hortus Cliffortianus, but the error was corrected in Species Plantarum in 1753. Tiarella cordifolia is sometimes called the false miterwort because of its similarity to Mitella, a genus of flowering plants known as the miterworts.

The taxonomy of Tiarella cordifolia is complex. Various authorities recognize from one to five related species, some of which include taxa at infraspecific rank. For example, the following alternative taxonomies of Tiarella cordifolia are in use:

- Flora of North America accepts a single species with no infraspecific taxa
- U.S. Department of Agriculture recognizes one species comprising three varieties
- Plants of the World Online accepts five related species with no infraspecific taxa

Both Flora of North America (FNA) and the U.S. Department of Agriculture (USDA) recognize one species of Tiarella in eastern North America. The two authorities differ in that the USDA taxonomy recognizes three varieties:

- Tiarella cordifolia L.
  - Tiarella cordifolia var. austrina Lakela
  - Tiarella cordifolia var. collina Wherry
  - Tiarella cordifolia var. cordifolia

The treatment in FNA considers var. austrina and var. collina to be synonyms for Tiarella cordifolia L.

Tiarella cordifolia var. austrina was described by American botanist Olga Lakela in an influential paper published in 1937. Lakela observed two important facts regarding the entity known as Tiarella cordifolia L. First, many (but not all) plants of the species have stolons (i.e., runners); and second, plants may or may not have stem leaves. In the northern part of its range, the species usually has a naked stem, but in the south, stem leaves are the rule rather than the exception. As described by Lakela, var. austrina includes plants with stolons in the southeastern United States. Although the variety usually has stem leaves, Lakela did not consider this to be of taxonomic significance and therefore did not use this fact to distinguish var. austrina from the typical variety.

Lakela segregated a population of plants that lacked stolons into a new species. Known as Tiarella wherryi Lakela, it has basal leaves and stem leaves similar to var. austrina, differing only with respect to stolon production. The species was named in honor of Edgar Wherry, the botanist who collected the specimens cited by Lakela. In 1940, Wherry himself described Tiarella cordifolia var. collina, a non-stoloniferous variety of T. cordifolia thought to be distinct from Tiarella wherryi Lakela. According to the USDA taxonomy, however, the latter is a synonym for Tiarella cordifolia var. collina Wherry.

Both Lakela and Wherry considered the northern stoloniferous form to be the typical variety of the species. Lakela explicitly described Tiarella cordifolia var. typica to represent this taxon. Unfortunately the name was invalidly published, and so the USDA taxonomy uses var. cordifolia to represent plants with stolons from the northeastern United States and adjacent Canada.

Despite the work of Lakela, Wherry, and others, the simple taxonomy in FNA is recognized by multiple authorities. The USDA taxonomy is used less so.

For a long time, botanists considered the stoloniferous northern expression initially described by Lakela to be the typical variant of the species. In 2021, Guy Nesom provided strong evidence that the type specimen of Tiarella cordifolia L. was sourced in northeastern Virginia, a region where the stoloniferous form of the species was not known to occur. Nesom went on to propose a major revision of the genus in which Tiarella cordifolia in the broad sense (labeled sensu lato below) consists of five closely related species:

- Tiarella cordifolia sensu lato
  - Tiarella austrina (Lakela) G.L.Nesom
    - Synonym: Tiarella cordifolia var. austrina Lakela
  - Tiarella cordifolia L. sensu stricto
    - Synonym: Tiarella cordifolia var. collina Wherry
  - Tiarella nautila G.L.Nesom
  - Tiarella stolonifera G.L.Nesom
    - Synonym: Tiarella cordifolia var. typica Lakela
  - Tiarella wherryi Lakela

In the strict sense (sensu stricto), Tiarella cordifolia L. refers to the non-stoloniferous form found along the East Coast of the United States. The new species Tiarella stolonifera represents the wide-ranging northern stoloniferous form that Lakela, Wherry, and others previously considered to be the typical form of Tiarella cordifolia. The southern stoloniferous form that Lakela called Tiarella cordifolia var. austrina was raised to species status. Finally, Nesom resurrected Tiarella wherryi Lakela, circumscribing it without stem leaves while simultaneously describing Tiarella nautila, a new southern non-stoloniferous form with stem leaves.

As of October 2022, the taxonomy proposed by Nesom is accepted by Plants of the World Online and a few other authorities. The taxonomy is especially popular in the southeastern United States where the diversity of Tiarella cordifolia sensu lato is greatest.

The taxonomies of Lakela and Nesom agree insofar as the ability to produce stolons (or not) warrants separate species, but the two authors disagree with respect to stem leaves. Lakela believed that the presence of stem leaves is "without taxonomic significance" whereas Nesom described two new species (T. austrina and T. nautila) based on that single character.

=== Other taxa ===
Tiarella macrophylla Small was described from Tyron Mountain, North Carolina in 1903, but the leaves of the specimen are from Heuchera villosa Michx., not Tiarella. Regardless, most authors consider the name to be a synonym for Tiarella cordifolia L. Since the choice of epithet (macrophylla) suggests that leaf morphology was intended to be the defining characteristic of the taxon, Tiarella macrophylla Small is in fact a synonym for Heuchera villosa Michx.

In 1917, Oliver Atkins Farwell described a variety of Tiarella cordifolia sensu lato collected in Michigan the year before. Unlike the typical northern form of T. cordifolia, Farwell's variety had a small bract on the flower stem. The name Tiarella cordifolia var. bracteata Farw. is now a synonym for Tiarella stolonifera.

== Distribution ==
In eastern North America, Tiarella cordifolia sensu lato is wide-ranging, from northeastern Wisconsin across southeastern Canada to Nova Scotia, extending southward through the Appalachians into Alabama and Mississippi:

- Canada: New Brunswick, Nova Scotia, Ontario, Québec
- United States: Connecticut, Georgia, Kentucky, Maine, Maryland, Massachusetts, Michigan, New Hampshire, New Jersey, New York, North Carolina, Ohio, Pennsylvania, Rhode Island, Tennessee, Vermont, Virginia, West Virginia, Wisconsin

Tiarella cordifolia sensu stricto prefers moist forests, coves, rock outcrops, and well-drained bottomlands. Its range is narrowly confined to the East Coast of the United States from Maryland southward through Virginia and the Carolinas, continuing into Georgia. Counties where the species is known to occur include:

- Georgia: Clarke, Elbert, Jackson
- Maryland: Charles, Montgomery, Prince George's
- North Carolina: Alamance, Alexander, Alleghany, Avery, Burke, Cabarrus, Caldwell, Catawba, Chatham, Cleveland, Cumberland, Davie, Durham, Forsyth, Gaston, Granville, Guilford, Harnett, Iredell, Johnston, Lee, Lincoln, McDowell, Mecklenburg, Montgomery, Orange, Randolph, Rockingham, Rowan, Rutherford, Stanly, Stokes, Surry, Union, Wake, Wilkes, Yadkin
- South Carolina: Abbeville, Cherokee, Chester, Edgefield, Fairfield, Kershaw, Lancaster, Laurens, McCormick, Newberry, Richland, Spartanburg, Union, York
- Virginia: Albemarle, Amelia, Amherst, Appomattox, Augusta, Bedford, Botetourt, Brunswick, Buckingham, Campbell, Caroline, Charlotte, Chesterfield, Culpeper, Cumberland, Fairfax, Fauquier, Fluvanna, Franklin, Goochland, Halifax, Henrico, Henry, James City, Lunenburg, Mecklenburg, Nelson, Patrick, Pittsylvania, Powhatan, Prince Edward, Roanoke, Spotsylvania, Stafford, Sussex

The range of Tiarella cordifolia sensu stricto does not significantly overlap with other Tiarella species. However, the ranges of T. cordifolia and T. stolonifera are immediately adjacent along the Blue Ridge Mountains in western Virginia and western North Carolina where both species are known to occur in a handful of North Carolina counties (Alleghany, Avery, Burke, McDowell, Wilkes). Likewise the ranges of T. cordifolia and T. austrina are adjacent in southwestern North Carolina and northwestern South Carolina. In northeastern Georgia, the ranges of T. cordifolia and T. nautila overlap in Jackson County.

== Ecology ==
Tiarella cordifolia sensu lato flowers March through July. A wide range of insects, including bees, butterflies, and syrphus flies, may serve as pollinators, but detailed published information on pollination is lacking.

== Conservation ==
The conservation status of Tiarella cordifolia sensu lato is globally secure (G5). Based on individual state rankings, it may be inferred that Tiarella cordifolia sensu stricto is globally secure as well.

== Cultivation ==
Tiarella cordifolia has gained the Royal Horticultural Society's Award of Garden Merit. It spreads well by rhizomes, unlike other cultivars of Tiarella, but lacks the invasive tendencies of many more commonly employed groundcovers.

Tiarella cordifolia 'FM Mooberry' is named after F. M. Mooberry of the Brandywine Conservancy.

== Bibliography ==
- Fields, Douglas; Brzeskiewicz, Marjory (December 22, 2002). "Conservation Assessment for Heart-leaved Foam-flower (Tiarella cordifolia)" (PDF). USDA Forest Service, Eastern Region. Archived from the original (PDF) on March 3, 2017.
- Lakela, Olga (1937). "A monograph of the genus Tiarella L. in North America". Amer. J. Bot. 24 (6): 344–351. Bibcode:1937AmJB...24..344L. doi:10.1002/j.1537-2197.1937.tb09109.x.
- Nesom, Guy L. (2021). "Taxonomy of Tiarella (Saxifragaceae) in the eastern USA" (PDF). Phytoneuron. 31: 1–61. ISSN 2153-733X.
- Weakley, Alan S.; Southeastern Flora Team (2022). "Flora of the southeastern United States". University of North Carolina Herbarium, North Carolina Botanical Garden.
