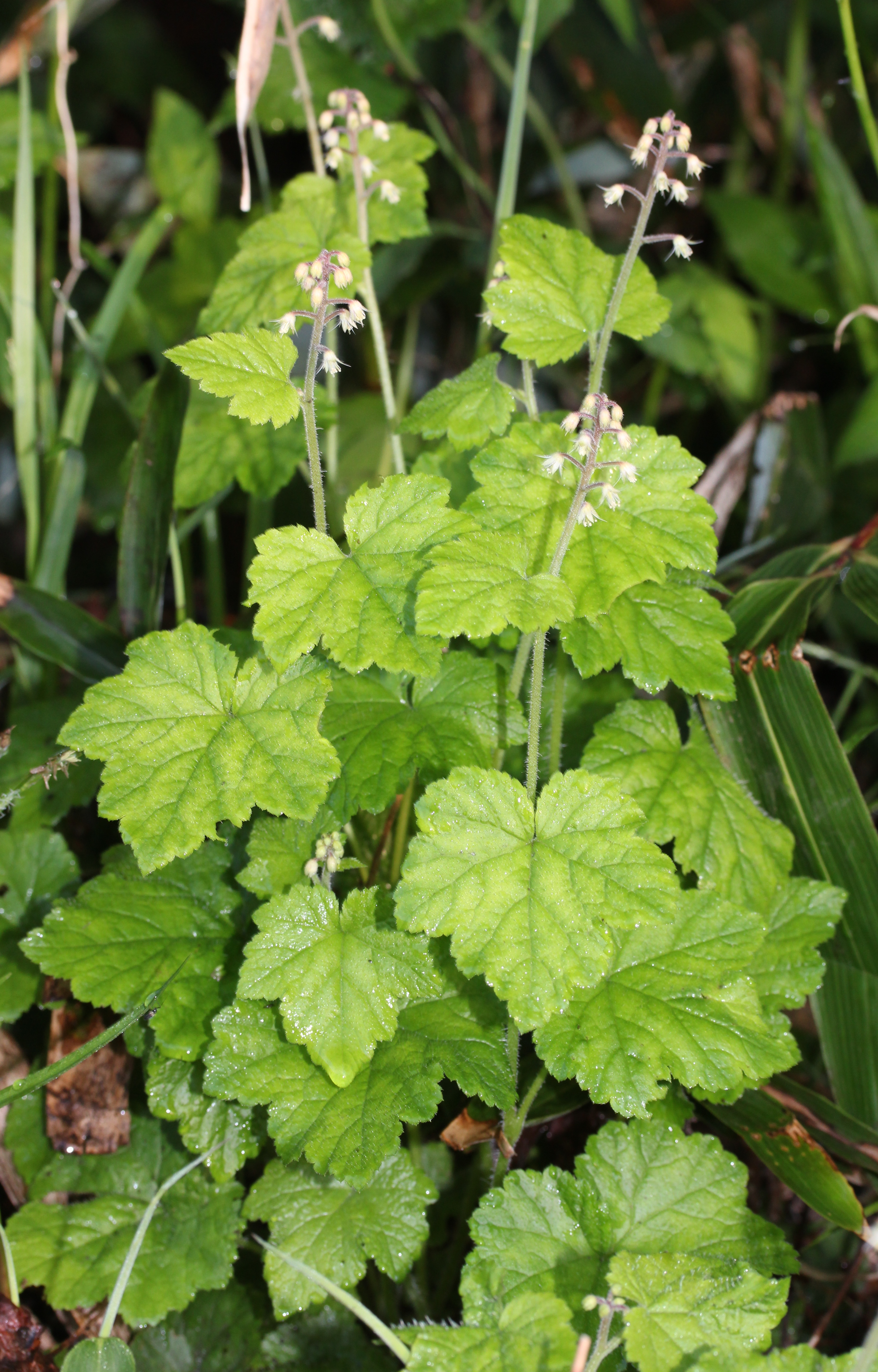
- Mount Haku, Gifu Prefecture, Japan

Scientific classification
- Kingdom: Plantae
- Clade: Tracheophytes
- Clade: Angiosperms
- Clade: Eudicots
- Order: Saxifragales
- Family: Saxifragaceae
- Genus: Tiarella
- Species: T. polyphylla

Binomial name
- Tiarella polyphylla D.Don

= Tiarella polyphylla =

Species of flowering plant

Tiarella polyphylla is a species of flowering plant in the family Saxifragaceae. The specific name polyphylla means "many-leaved". The species is native to Asia, ranging from the eastern Himalayas to China, east Asia, and southeast Asia. It is sometimes called the Asian foamflower.

== Description ==
Tiarella polyphylla is a perennial, herbaceous plant with a short, slender rhizome. It has numerous heart-shaped basal leaves, each with a petiole 2–12 cm (0.8–4.7 in) long. There are two or three smaller leaves on the flowering stem. Each flower is small and whitish, with ovate sepals 1.5 mm (0.06 in) long but with no petals.

== Taxonomy ==
Tiarella polyphylla was described by David Don in 1825. Its type specimen was collected by Nathaniel Wallich in Nepal in 1821. The species is relatively constant in morphology and apparently without synonymy. For a long time it was thought that the two North American species (Tiarella cordifolia and Tiarella trifoliata) were more closely related to each other than to T. polyphylla, but phylogenetic analysis suggests that the latter is more closely related to T. cordifolia than it is to T. trifoliata.

The primary taxonomic source for this species is Flora of China (FoC). As of October 2022, the treatment of Tiarella polyphylla D.Don in FoC is widely recognized.

== Distribution ==
Tiarella polyphylla is an Asian species, ranging from the eastern Himalayas to China, east Asia, and southeast Asia:

- Eastern Himalayas: Nepal, northeast India (Assam, Sikkim), Bhutan, Tibet Autonomous Region
- China: southeastern Gansu, Guangdong, Guangxi, Guizhou, Hubei, Hunan, Jiangxi, southern Shaanxi, Sichuan, southern Xizang, Yunnan
- East Asia: Korea, Japan, Taiwan
- Southeast Asia: northern Myanmar (Burma)

In China, it is found in moist forests and shady wet places at altitudes from 1,000 to 3,800 meters (3,300 to 12,500 ft).

== Bibliography ==
- Nesom, Guy L. (2021). "Taxonomy of Tiarella (Saxifragaceae) in the eastern USA" (PDF). Phytoneuron. 31: 1–61. ISSN 2153-733X.
