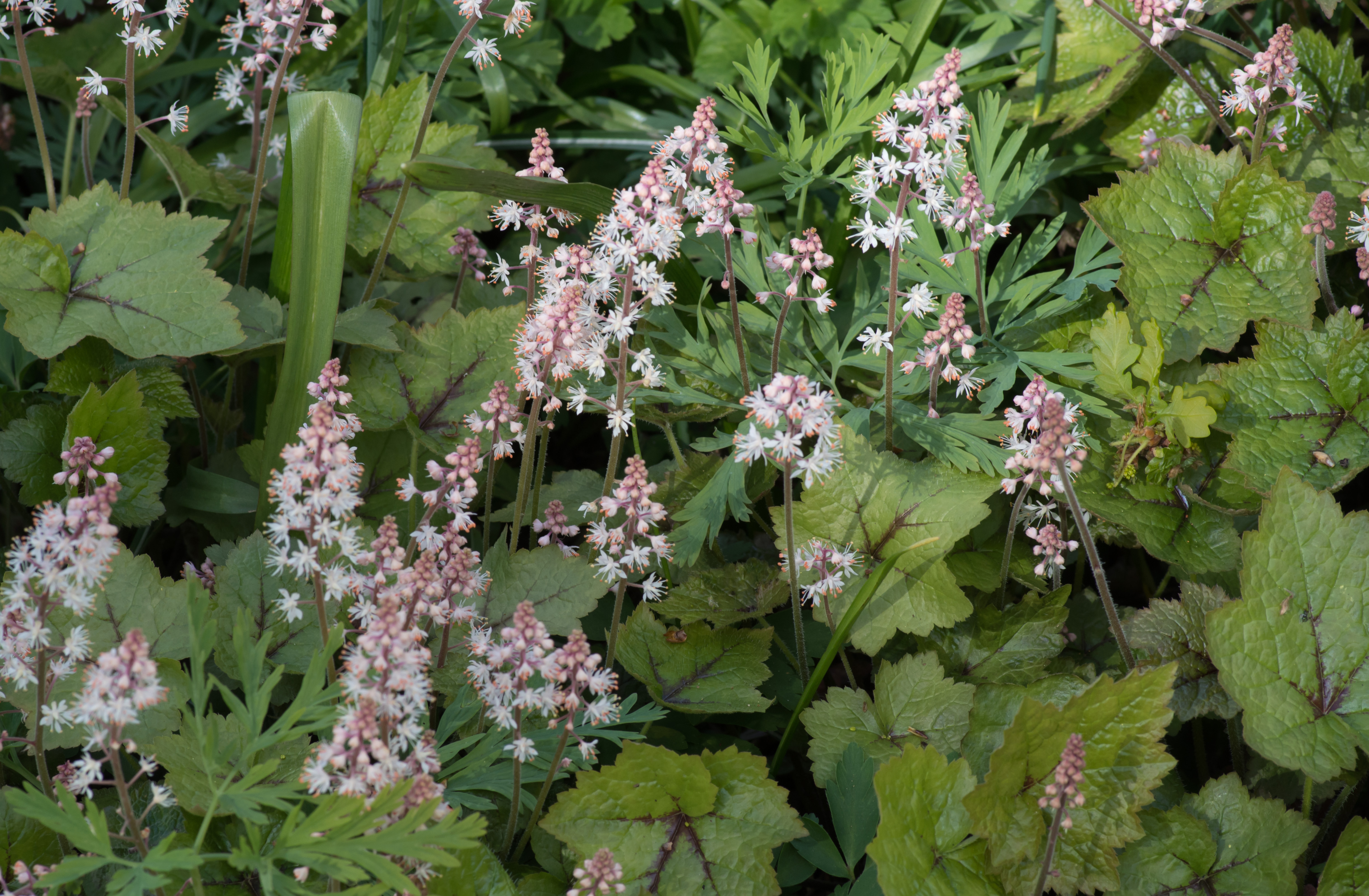
- Tiarella wherryi

Conservation status
- Apparently Secure (NatureServe)

Scientific classification
- Kingdom: Plantae
- Clade: Tracheophytes
- Clade: Angiosperms
- Clade: Eudicots
- Order: Saxifragales
- Family: Saxifragaceae
- Genus: Tiarella
- Species: T. wherryi

Binomial name
- Tiarella wherryi Lakela

= Tiarella wherryi =

Species of flowering plant

Tiarella wherryi is a species of flowering plant in the family Saxifragaceae. The specific name wherryi recognizes Edgar Wherry, the botanist who collected some of the first specimens in the early 1930s. Commonly called Wherry's foamflower, it is the southernmost of all species of Tiarella in the southeastern United States, where its range approaches the Gulf Coast in southern Alabama.

== Description ==
Tiarella wherryi is a perennial, herbaceous plant with a short, slender rhizome. It has a leafless flowering stem and relatively large basal leaves, each with an extended terminal lobe. Most importantly, the species lacks the ability to produce stolons.

=== Identification ===
To positively identify Tiarella wherryi, all of the following key features must be verified (in any order):

- Stolon always absent
- Basal leaves usually longer than wide
- Basal leaf lobes usually acute-acuminate with the terminal lobe prominently extended
- Flowering stem without leaves or foliaceous bracts

If the plant in question has a stolon, it is not Tiarella wherryi. In that case, it is either Tiarella stolonifera or Tiarella austrina.

Except for the flowering stem, the key features listed above are identical to those of Tiarella nautila, so distinguishing the two species may be difficult. Also note that Tiarella wherryi is similar to Tiarella cordifolia, differing only in the basal leaves.

== Taxonomy ==
Tiarella wherryi was described by Olga Lakela in 1937. Its type specimen was collected by Edgar Wherry in Polk County, Tennessee in 1933. The specific name wherryi honors the man whose "collections and suggestions have materially contributed to the progress and the outcome of the study". Accordingly the species is commonly called Wherry's foamflower.

Lakela segregated Tiarella wherryi from Tiarella cordifolia but the influential Flora of North America considered T. wherryi to be a synonym for T. cordifolia. Subsequently most authorities followed suit. In 2021, Guy Nesom resurrected T. wherryi as one of five species in eastern North America.

== Distribution ==
Tiarella wherryi is endemic to the southeastern United States, ranging from southern Kentucky to southern Alabama, and from there eastward into Georgia. Counties where the species is known to occur include:

- Alabama: Baldwin, Barbour, Blount, Calhoun, Cherokee, Clarke, Clay, Cleburne, Colbert, Conecuh, Coosa, Cullman, DeKalb, Elmore, Etowah, Franklin, Hale, Henry, Houston, Jackson, Lauderdale, Lawrence, Lee, Madison, Marengo, Marion, Marshall, Monroe, Morgan, Randolph, Russell, Saint Clair, Talladega, Tallapoosa, Tuscaloosa, Walker, Winston
- Georgia: Bartow, Carroll, Catoosa, Clay, Clayton, Dade, Decatur, Early, Floyd, Fulton, Gordon, Haralson, Harris, Polk, Quitman, Randolph, Upson, Walker, Whitfield
- Kentucky: Clinton, Cumberland, Edmonson, Hart, Laurel, McCreary, Metcalfe, Pulaski, Wayne
- Mississippi: Choctaw, Itawamba, Monroe, Tishomingo
- Tennessee: Anderson, Bedford, Bledsoe, Bradley, Campbell, Cannon, Coffee, Cumberland, Davidson, DeKalb, Fentress, Franklin, Giles, Grundy, Hamilton, Hickman, Jackson, Knox, Lawrence, Lewis, Lincoln, Loudon, Macon, Marion, Marshall, Maury, McMinn, Meigs, Monroe, Moore, Morgan, Overton, Pickett, Polk, Putnam, Rutherford, Rhea, Roane, Scott, Sequatchie, Smith, Sumner, Trousdale, Van Buren, Warren, Wayne, White, Williamson, Wilson

The range of Tiarella wherryi overlaps with that of T. stolonifera in Kentucky (Laurel, McCreary, Pulaski) and Tennessee (Anderson, Campbell, Knox, Morgan, Roane, Scott); with T. nautila in Georgia (Bartow, Floyd) and Tennessee (Monroe, Polk); and with a small disjunct population of T. austrina in Alabama (Jackson, Madison) and Tennessee (Franklin). In northeastern Georgia, the range of T. wherryi approaches that of T. cordifolia in the vicinity of Jackson County.

== Conservation ==
The global conservation status of Tiarella wherryi is unknown. Based on the individual state rankings of Tiarella cordifolia sensu lato, it may be inferred that Tiarella wherryi is imperiled (S2) in Mississippi.

== Bibliography ==
- Nesom, Guy L. (2021). "Taxonomy of Tiarella (Saxifragaceae) in the eastern USA" (PDF). Phytoneuron. 31: 1–61. ISSN 2153-733X.
- Weakley, Alan S.; Southeastern Flora Team (2022). "Flora of the southeastern United States". University of North Carolina Herbarium, North Carolina Botanical Garden.
