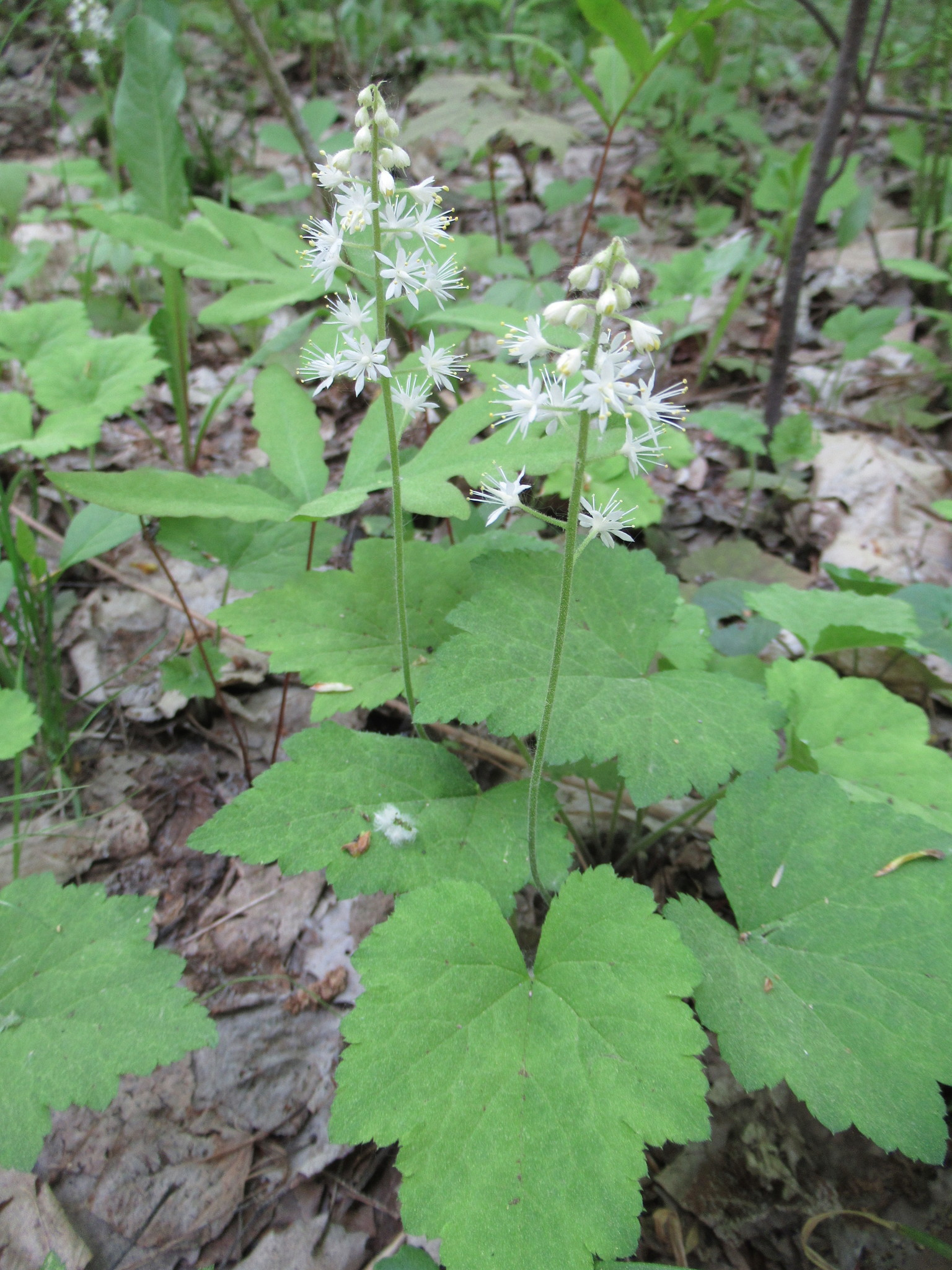
- Vaudreuil-Soulanges, Québec, CA (May 17)

Scientific classification
- Kingdom: Plantae
- Clade: Tracheophytes
- Clade: Angiosperms
- Clade: Eudicots
- Order: Saxifragales
- Family: Saxifragaceae
- Genus: Tiarella
- Species: T. stolonifera

Binomial name
- Tiarella stolonifera G.L.Nesom

Synonyms
- T. stolonifera: Tiarella cordifolia f. allanthera Vict. & J.Rousseau; Tiarella cordifolia var. bracteata Farw.

= Tiarella stolonifera =

Species of flowering plant

Tiarella stolonifera is a species of flowering plant in the family Saxifragaceae. The specific name stolonifera means "spreading by stolons", an important characteristic of this species (not to be confused with Tiarella austrina, which also spreads by stolons). Known as the creeping foamflower, it has the widest range of any species of Tiarella in eastern North America.

== Description ==
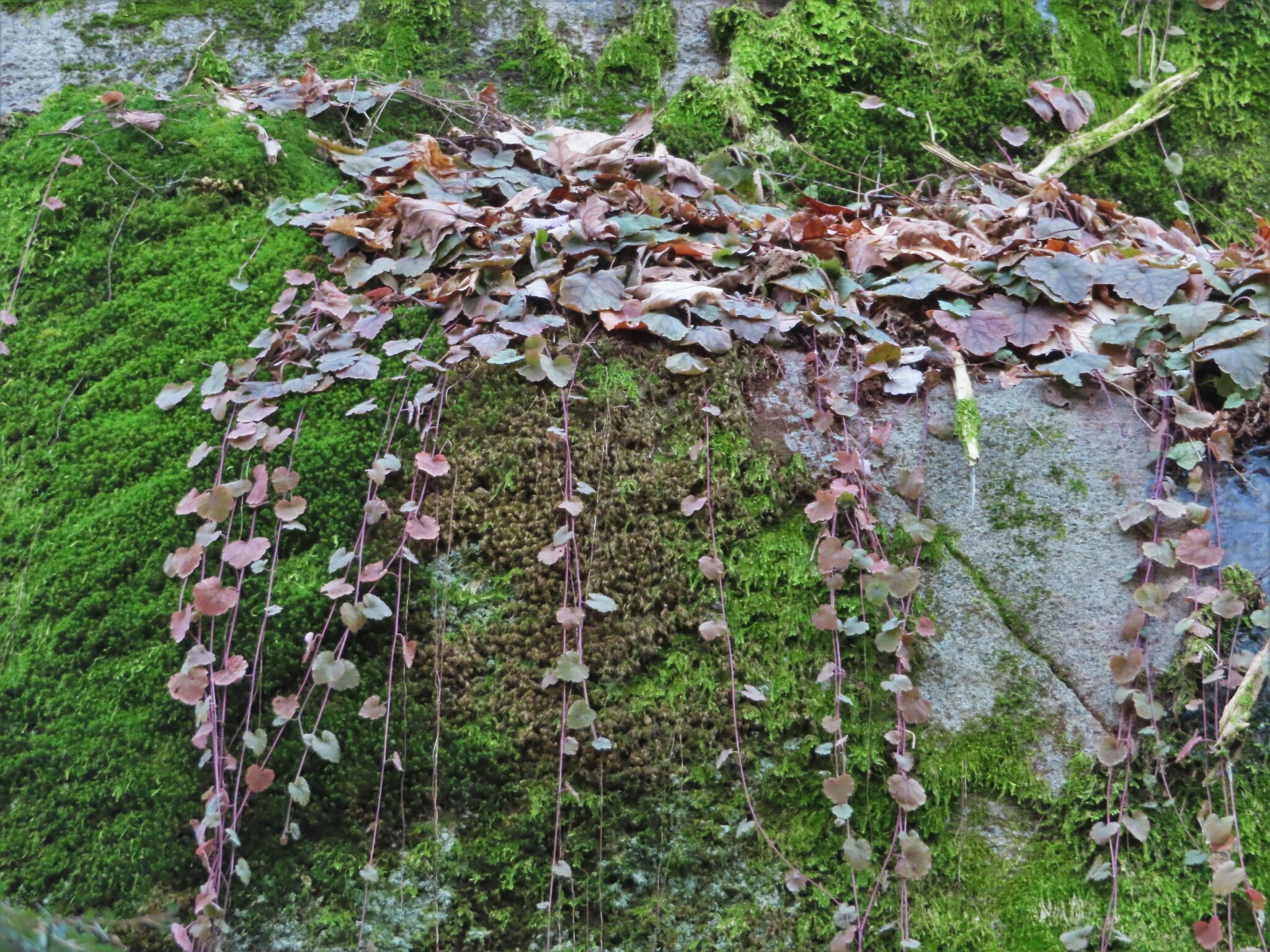
With stolons, Saratoga County, New York (Jan 10)

Tiarella stolonifera is a perennial, herbaceous plant with a short, slender rhizome. It has a leafless flowering stem and relatively small basal leaves without an extended terminal lobe. Most importantly, the species has the ability to produce stolons.

The heart-shaped basal leaves of Tiarella stolonifera resemble those of species in other genera. For example, T. stolonifera is sometimes confused with Mitella diphylla, a closely related species that occurs over a similar range and habitat. If a plant lacks sufficient evidence of flowering, the orientation of the hairs on the basal leaf stalk may be used to distinguish the two species. T. stolonifera has dense spreading hairs (outward-facing, angled 90 degrees) of various lengths while M. diphylla has long retrorse hairs (backward-facing, angled 45 degrees or less) sparsely distributed along its basal leaf stalk.

=== Identification ===
To positively identify Tiarella stolonifera, all of the following key features must be verified (in any order):

- Stolon present
- Basal leaves usually about as long as wide
- Basal leaf lobes usually obtuse to rounded with the terminal lobe not extended
- Flowering stem without leaves or foliaceous bracts

The key features listed above are similar to those of Tiarella cordifolia but the presence of a stolon rules out that species.

== Taxonomy ==
In 1937, Olga Lakela split Tiarella cordifolia sensu lato into two mutually exclusive groups, one with stolons and one without. She described two varieties of Tiarella cordifolia (var. typica and var. austrina) to represent the northern and southern varieties (resp.) of the group with stolons. However, the name Tiarella cordifolia var. typica Lakela was invalidly published.

Guy Nesom likewise split Tiarella cordifolia sensu lato into two groups based on stolons in 2021. In particular, he described Tiarella stolonifera, a northern species with stolons, and Tiarella austrina, the corresponding southern species based on Lakela's variety.

In 1917, Oliver Atkins Farwell described a variety of Tiarella cordifolia sensu lato with a small bract on the flower stem. Farwell's type specimen did not include a stolon, but since it was collected in Michigan, Tiarella cordifolia var. bracteata Farw. is considered to be a synonym for Tiarella stolonifera G.L.Nesom. The occasional plant with a leafy flowering stem found throughout the range of the species is not to be confused with Tiarella austrina, a distinct species that has both a stolon and stem leaves.

== Distribution and habitat ==
Tiarella stolonifera has the widest range of any Tiarella species in eastern North America, from Wisconsin across the eastern half of the Great Lakes region into the northeastern United States and adjacent Canada, and from there, south into Kentucky, Virginia, Tennessee, and North Carolina. It is the only species of Tiarella in the following 17 provinces and states:

- Canada: New Brunswick, Nova Scotia, Ontario, Québec
- United States: Connecticut, Maine, Massachusetts, Michigan, New Hampshire, New Jersey, New York, Ohio, Pennsylvania, Rhode Island, Vermont, West Virginia, Wisconsin

Tiarella stolonifera and at least one other species of Tiarella are found in five (5) additional states. Relevant counties include:

- Kentucky: Bell, Carter, Clay, Elliot, Estill, Floyd, Gallatin, Garrard, Greenup, Harlan, Jackson, Jessamine, Jefferson, Johnson, Kenton, Knott, Knox, Laurel, Lee, Leslie, Letcher, Lincoln, Madison, Martin, McCreary, Menifee, Perry, Pike, Powell, Pulaski, Rockcastle, Rowan, Whitley, Wolfe, Woodford
- Maryland: Allegany, Garrett, Harford, Washington
- North Carolina: Alleghany, Ashe, Avery, Buncombe, Burke, Madison, McDowell, Mitchell, Watauga, Wilkes, Yancy
- Tennessee: Anderson, Campbell, Carter, Claiborne, Grainger, Greene, Hancock, Hawkins, Knox, Morgan, Roane, Scott, Unicoi, Union, Washington
- Virginia: Bath, Bland, Buchanan, Carroll, Dickenson, Floyd, Giles, Grayson, Highland, Pulaski, Rockbridge, Rockingham, Russell, Scott, Smyth, Tazewell, Washington, Wise, Wythe

The ranges of Tiarella stolonifera and Tiarella wherryi overlap in Kentucky (Laurel, McCreary, Pulaski) and Tennessee (Anderson, Campbell, Knox, Morgan, Roane, Scott). The ranges of Tiarella stolonifera and Tiarella cordifolia sensu stricto overlap in western North Carolina (Alleghany, Avery, Burke, McDowell, Wilkes). Both Tiarella stolonifera and Tiarella austrina occur in Buncombe County, North Carolina.

Tiarella stolonifera is typically found in moist, rich, deciduous woods with a fairly open understory, in partial to full shade. Trees associated with the species include sugar maple (Acer saccharum), white ash (Fraxinus americana), yellow birch (Betula alleghaniensis), American beech (Fagus grandifolia), eastern hemlock (Tsuga canadensis), and northern white-cedar (Thuja occidentalis).

In Wisconsin, T. stolonifera occurs in mature, second-growth sugar maple-beech or hemlock-hardwood forest with sparse shrub layers. In its usual streamside habitat, the soil is very moist due to a high water table. The ground flora is rich with spring ephemerals and other herbaceous species, including Dicentra, Cardamine, Viola, and Mitella diphylla. In Michigan, it is found in deciduous and mixed woods, often in wet hollows or springy places.

In the Adirondack Mountains of New York, T. stolonifera commonly occurs on low-acidic sites under northern hardwoods, but it is also found along brooks in coniferous forests where organic acids cannot readily accumulate. In the White Mountain National Forest in New Hampshire, it is found in dense colonies at the edges of seeps and ephemeral streams. The species was probably an important element of the ground flora in at least parts of the original hemlock-white pine-northern hardwoods forest of New England.

In New Brunswick and Nova Scotia, T. stolonifera is found on fairly strong calcareous soils where there is some seepage water flowing to the surface. In New Brunswick, it is most often found in Thuja-dominated habitats, especially valley slopes and creek valley floors. In southern Ontario, it typically occurs in better-quality cedar seepage swamps and cedar-dominated riparian habitats.

== Conservation ==
Based on the individual state rankings of Tiarella cordifolia sensu lato, it may be inferred that Tiarella stolonifera is globally secure. It is vulnerable at best (S2S3) in Nova Scotia and critically imperiled (S1) in Wisconsin. It is also critically imperiled in New Jersey.

== Bibliography ==
- Fields, Douglas; Brzeskiewicz, Marjory (2002). "Conservation Assessment for Heart-leaved Foam-flower (Tiarella cordifolia)" (PDF). USDA Forest Service, Eastern Region. Archived from the original (PDF) on March 3, 2017.
- Nesom, Guy L. (2021). "Taxonomy of Tiarella (Saxifragaceae) in the eastern USA" (PDF). Phytoneuron. 31: 1–61. ISSN 2153-733X.
- Weakley, Alan S.; Southeastern Flora Team (2022). "Flora of the southeastern United States". University of North Carolina Herbarium, North Carolina Botanical Garden.
