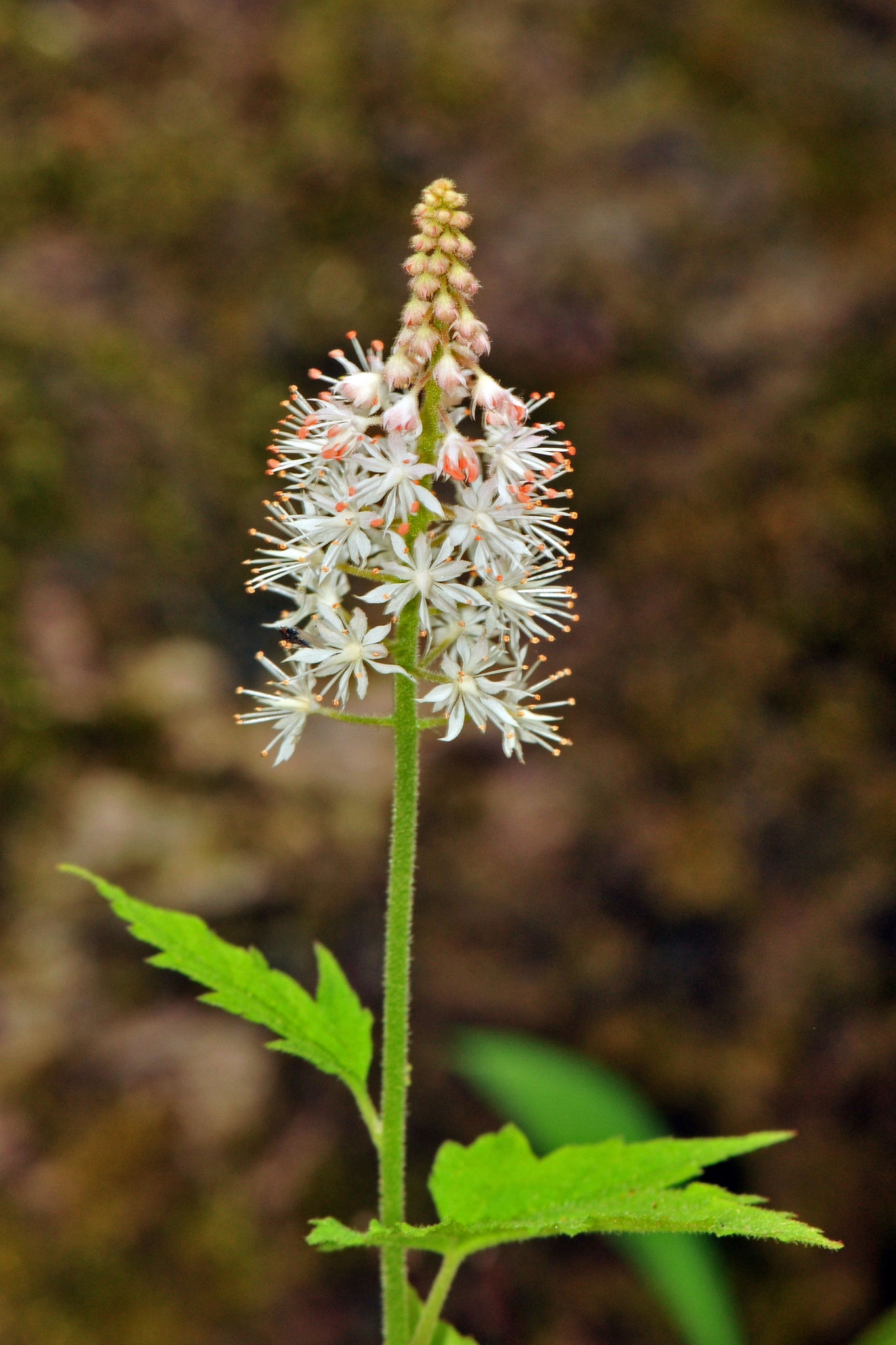
- Lumpkin County, Georgia, USA (April 17)

Conservation status
- Vulnerable (NatureServe)

Scientific classification
- Kingdom: Plantae
- Clade: Tracheophytes
- Clade: Angiosperms
- Clade: Eudicots
- Order: Saxifragales
- Family: Saxifragaceae
- Genus: Tiarella
- Species: T. nautila

Binomial name
- Tiarella nautila G.L.Nesom

= Tiarella nautila =

Species of flowering plant

Tiarella nautila is a species of flowering plant in the family Saxifragaceae. The specific name nautila alludes to its sail-like stem leaves. Accordingly, it is sometimes called the sail-leaf foamflower. The species is narrowly endemic to the Blue Ridge Mountains in the southeastern United States.

== Description ==
Tiarella nautila is a perennial, herbaceous plant with a short, slender rhizome. It has a leafy flowering stem and relatively large basal leaves with an extended terminal lobe. Most importantly, the species lacks the ability to produce stolons.

=== Identification ===
To positively identify Tiarella nautila, all of the following key features must be verified (in any order):

- Stolon always absent
- Basal leaves usually longer than wide
- Basal leaf lobes usually acute-acuminate with the terminal lobe prominently extended
- Flowering stem usually with leaves or foliaceous bracts

If the plant in question has a stolon, it is not Tiarella nautila. In that case, it is either Tiarella stolonifera or Tiarella austrina.

Except for the flowering stem, the key features listed above are identical to those of Tiarella wherryi, so distinguishing the two species may be difficult. Likewise, except for the stolon, Tiarella nautila has features similar to Tiarella austrina, so expect difficulties there as well.

Sometimes Tiarella nautila has a branched flowering stem. Since no other species of Tiarella has that feature, a branched flowering stem is sufficient to identify Tiarella nautila.

== Taxonomy ==
Tiarella nautila was described by Guy Nesom in 2021. Its type specimen was collected by Arthur Cronquist in Union County, Georgia in 1947.

== Distribution ==
Tiarella nautila is narrowly endemic to the southeastern United States where it occurs mainly in the southern Blue Ridge Mountains of northern Georgia and adjacent North Carolina and Tennessee. Counties where the species is known to occur include:

- Georgia: Bartow, Cherokee, Cobb, Dawson, DeKalb, Fannin, Floyd, Forsyth, Gilmer, Hall, Jackson, Lumpkin, Murray, Pickens, Towns, Union, White
- North Carolina: Cherokee
- Tennessee: Monroe, Polk

The ranges of Tiarella nautila and Tiarella austrina overlap in Georgia (Dawson, Towns, White), North Carolina (Cherokee), and Tennessee (Monroe). The ranges of Tiarella nautila and Tiarella wherryi overlap in Georgia (Bartow, Floyd) and Tennessee (Monroe, Polk). The ranges of Tiarella nautila and Tiarella cordifolia overlap in Jackson County, Georgia.

== Conservation ==
The global conservation status of Tiarella nautila is unknown. In North Carolina, it is imperiled at best (S1S2).

== Bibliography ==
- Nesom, Guy L. (2021). "Taxonomy of Tiarella (Saxifragaceae) in the eastern USA" (PDF). Phytoneuron. 31: 1–61. ISSN 2153-733X.
- Weakley, Alan S.; Southeastern Flora Team (2022). "Flora of the southeastern United States". University of North Carolina Herbarium, North Carolina Botanical Garden.
