= Harperia =

Scientific classification
- Kingdom: Plantae
- Clade: Tracheophytes
- Clade: Angiosperms
- Clade: Monocots
- Clade: Commelinids
- Order: Poales
- Family: Restionaceae
- Genus: Harperia; W.Fitzg. 1904 not Rose 1905 (syn of Ptilimnium in Apiaceae)

Type species
- Harperia lateriflora W.Fitzg.

Genus of flowering plants

Harperia is a group of plants in the Restionaceae described as a genus in 1904. The entire genus is endemic to the State of Western Australia.

Species

- Harperia confertospicata (Steud.) B.G.Briggs & L.A.S.Johnson
- Harperia eyreana B.G.Briggs & L.A.S.Johnson
- Harperia ferruginipes Meney & Pate
- Harperia lateriflora W.Fitzg.

Name in homonymic genus

In 1905, Rose applied the name Harperia to a plant in the Apiaceae, thus creating an illegitimate homonym. He also created one species name within his genus, i.e.

- Harperia nodosa Rose, syn of Harperella nodosa (Rose) Rose or Ptilimnium nodosum (Rose) Mathias or Carum nodosum (Rose) Koso-Pol.
