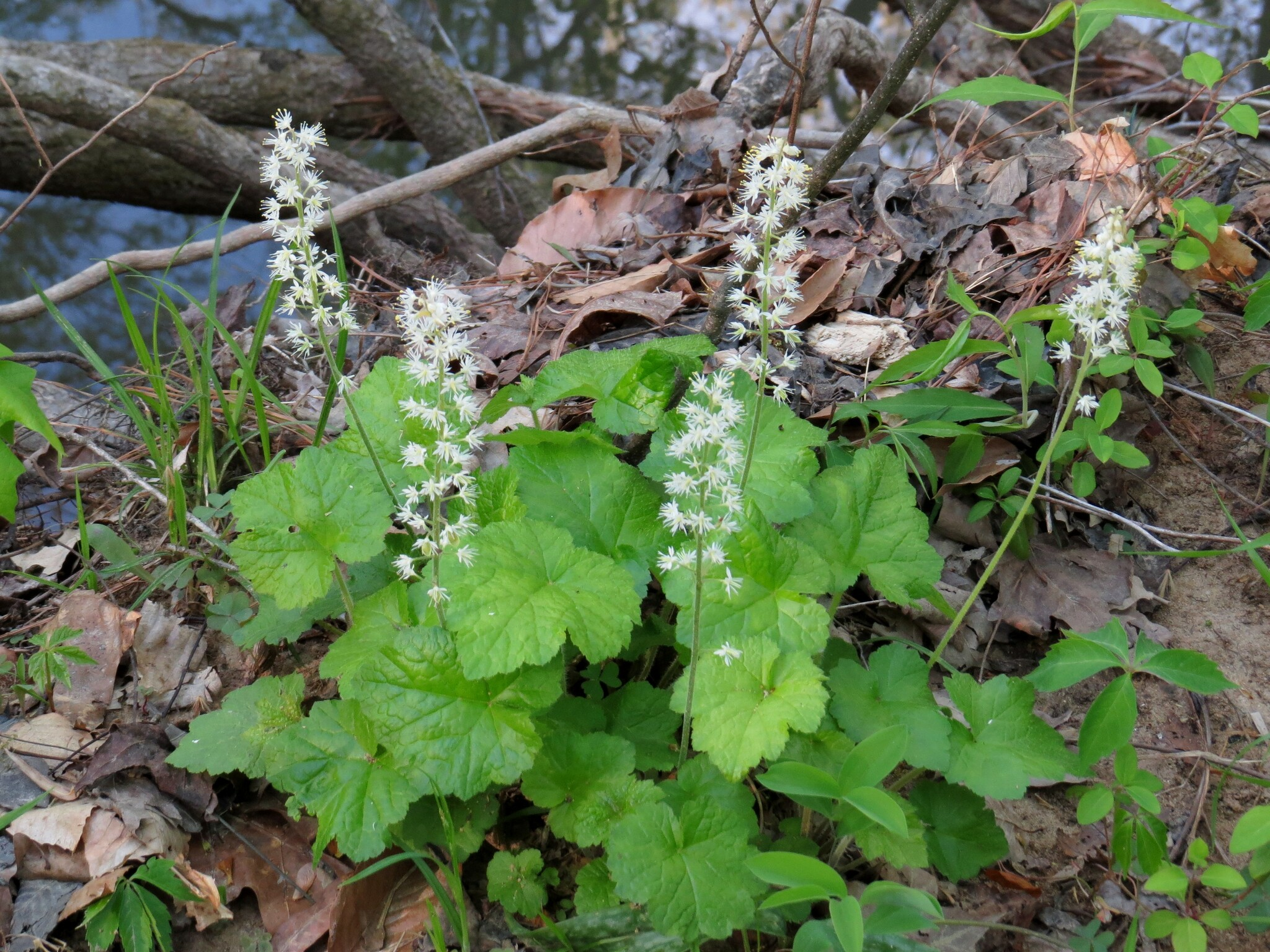
- Tiarella cordifolia sensu stricto Orange County, North Carolina, US (21 April)

Scientific classification
- Kingdom: Plantae
- Clade: Embryophytes
- Clade: Tracheophytes
- Clade: Spermatophytes
- Clade: Angiosperms
- Clade: Eudicots
- Order: Saxifragales
- Family: Saxifragaceae
- Genus: Tiarella; L.

Type species
- Tiarella cordifolia L.

Synonyms
- Blondia Neck.; Petalosteira Raf.

= Tiarella =

Genus of flowering plants

Tiarella, the foamflowers, is a genus of flowering plants in the family Saxifragaceae. The generic name Tiarella means "little turban", which suggests the shape of the seed capsules. Worldwide there are seven species, one each in eastern Asia and western North America, plus five species in eastern North America. As of October 2022, the taxonomy of Tiarella in eastern North America is in flux.

== Description ==
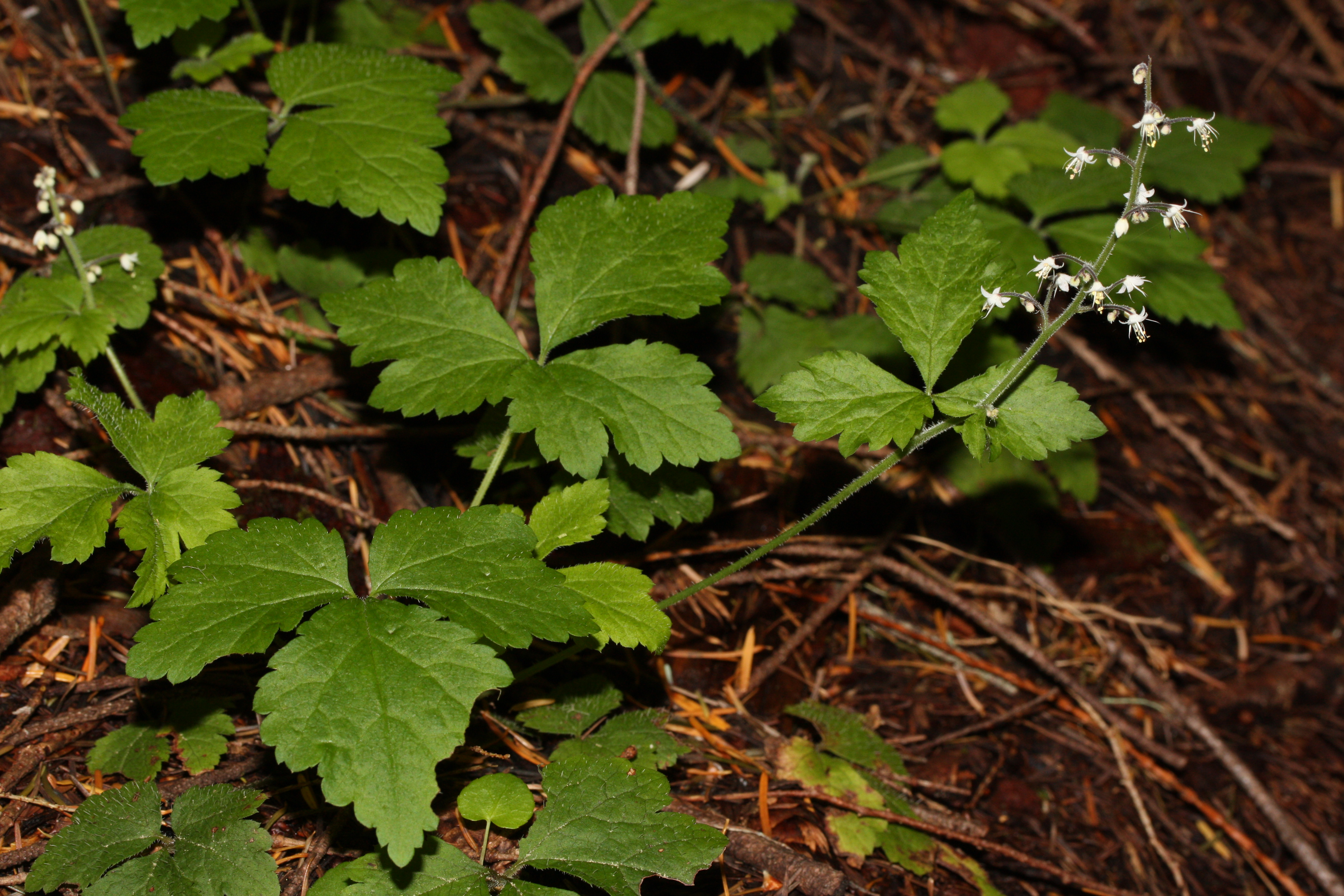
Tiarella trifoliata habit (23 June)

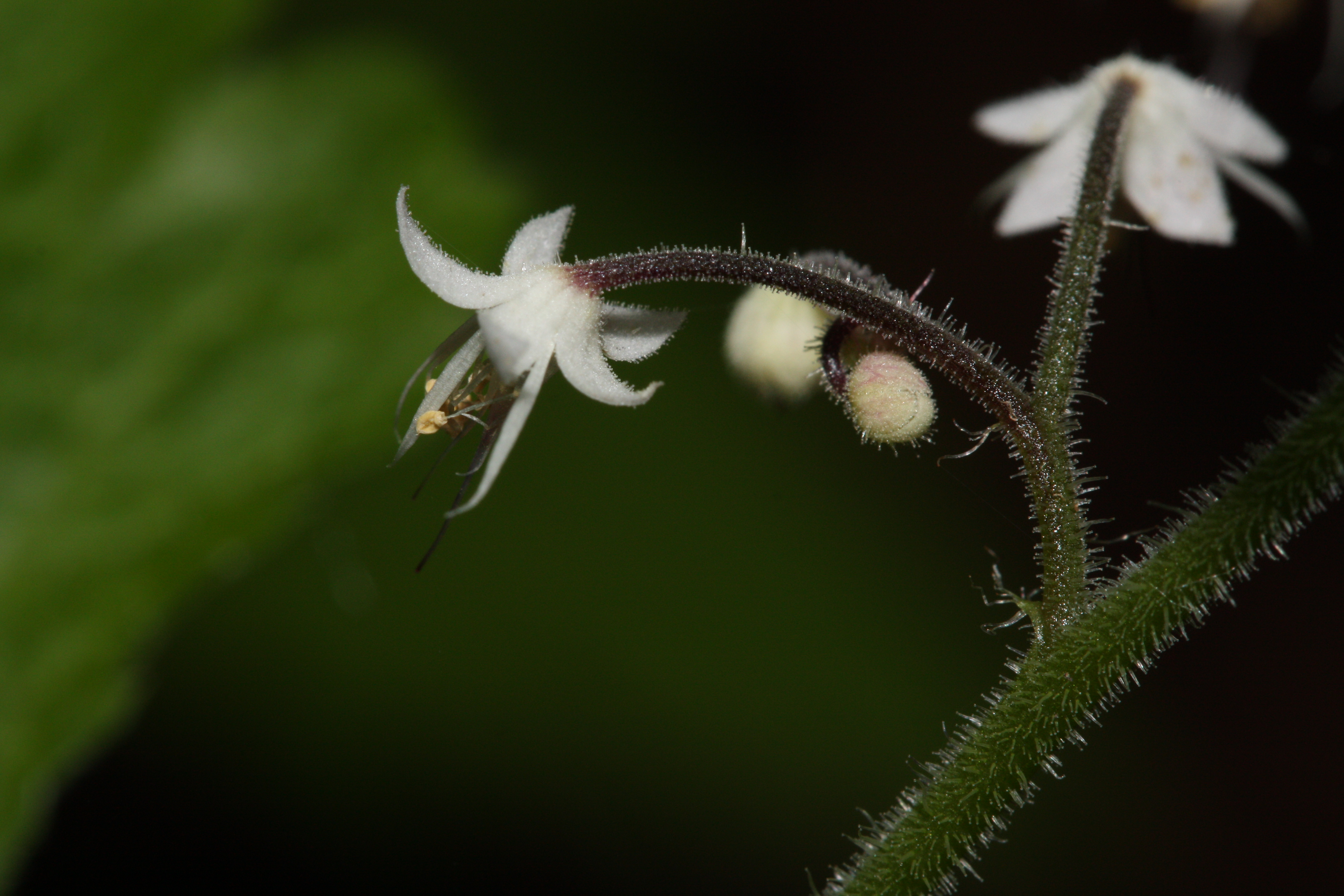
Tiarella trifoliata flowers (23 June)

Plants of genus Tiarella are perennial, herbaceous plants with short, slender rhizomes. Three morphological features are used to distinguish Tiarella species: 1) presence or absence of stolons; 2) size and shape of basal leaves; and 3) presence or absence of stem leaves (also called cauline leaves). Two species of Tiarella have stolons (T. austrina, T. stolonifera) while two other species have stem leaves (T. nautila, T. austrina). Plants from the southern Blue Ridge Mountains and southward have relatively large basal leaves with an extended terminal lobe (T. austrina, T. nautila, T. wherryi).

The following identification key was published by Guy Nesom in 2021:

Identification Key
1a. Inflorescence a narrow panicle or thyrse (branches with 2–5 flowers), usually with a single axis; petals linear to subulate; styles 2–3 mm long; leaves simple to trifoliolate; western North America	T. trifoliata
1b. Inflorescence a raceme (branches usually with 1 flower), axis usually single but sometimes branched; petals absent or else present and oblanceolate to elliptic; styles 1 mm or less long; leaves simple; Asia or eastern North America	2
2a. Petals absent; Asia	T. polyphylla
2b. Petals present; eastern North America	3
3a. Plants always with herbaceous, leafy stolons	4
4a. Leaves usually with obtuse to rounded lobes, terminal lobe not prominently extended; flowering stem very rarely with a small bract; sepals 2.5–3.5 mm long	T. stolonifera
4b. Leaves usually with acute-acuminate lobes, terminal lobe prominently extended; flowering stem usually with 1–2 leaves or foliaceous bracts; sepals 1.5–2 mm long	T. austrina
3b. Plants without herbaceous, leafy stolons	5
5a. Leaves usually about as long as wide, usually with obtuse to rounded lobes, terminal lobe not extended; sepals 2.5–3 mm long	T. cordifolia
5b. Leaves usually longer than wide, usually with acute-acuminate lobes, terminal lobe prominently extended; sepals 1.5–2 mm long	6
6a. Flowering stem usually with leaves or foliaceous bracts	T. nautila
6b. Flowering stem without leaves or foliaceous bracts	T. wherryi

== Taxonomy ==
In 1753, Swedish botanist Carl Linnaeus established genus Tiarella by recognizing two species, Tiarella cordifolia and Tiarella trifoliata. A third species, Tiarella polyphylla, was described by David Don in 1825. Together these three species form the taxonomic backbone of the genus. In 1840, in the first critical treatment of Tiarella since Linnaeus, John Torrey and Asa Gray described two new sections:

- Tiarella sect. Anthonema Nutt. apud Torr. et Gray: flowering stem leafy with alternate leaves; flowers paniculate; petals filiform or subulate; western North America
- Tiarella sect. Eutiarella Torr. et Gray: flowering stem naked; flowers racemose; petals oblong with a small claw or stalk; eastern North America.

Olga Lakela highlighted the section names in 1937, but they have since fallen out of favor with botanists, mainly because Tiarella polyphylla is inconsistent with the dichotomy, but perhaps also because there are taxa with leafy flowering stems in both western and eastern North America.

In Asia, the genus is represented by one species (Tiarella polyphylla). In North America, there have been numerous major treatments of genus Tiarella, with taxonomies recognizing from two to six species, some including infraspecific taxa.

	Tiarella trifoliata and related taxa (Tiarella sect. Anthonema)			Tiarella cordifolia and related taxa (Tiarella sect. Eutiarella)		
	Species	Varieties	Forms	Species	Varieties	Forms
Linnaeus 1753.	1			1		
Torrey & Gray 1840.	3			1		
Lakela 1937.	4		2	2	2	3
Jog 2009.	1	3		1		
USDA 2014.	1	3		1	3	
Nesom 2021.	1			5		

Currently accepted taxonomies are based on three sources:

- Tiarella polyphylla in Flora of China
- Tiarella trifoliata and related taxa in Flora of North America
- Tiarella cordifolia and related taxa in a paper published by Guy Nesom in 2021

The treatment in the first source is near-universally accepted, the second is widely recognized, while the third is new and growing in acceptance. A few authorities (with global scope) accept all three.

=== Infrageneric taxa ===
All names used in this section are taken from the International Plant Names Index, except where noted. The geographical locations are taken from Plants of the World Online (POWO). As of October 2022, POWO accepts 7 species and 3 infraspecies:

- Tiarella austrina (Lakela) G.L.Nesom: Alabama, Georgia, North Carolina, South Carolina, Tennessee
- Tiarella cordifolia L. sensu stricto: Georgia, Maryland, North Carolina, South Carolina, Virginia
- Tiarella nautila G.L.Nesom: Georgia, North Carolina, Tennessee
- Tiarella polyphylla D.Don: Assam, China, East Himalaya, Japan, Korea, Myanmar, Nepal, Taiwan, Tibet
- Tiarella stolonifera G.L.Nesom: Connecticut, Kentucky, Maine, Maryland, Massachusetts, Michigan, New Brunswick, New Hampshire, New Jersey, New York, North Carolina, Nova Scotia, Ohio, Ontario, Pennsylvania, Québec, Rhode Island, Tennessee, Vermont, Virginia, West Virginia, Wisconsin
- Tiarella trifoliata L.
  - Tiarella trifoliata var. laciniata (Hook.) Wheelock: British Columbia, Oregon, Washington
  - Tiarella trifoliata var. trifoliata: Alaska, Alberta, British Columbia, California, Idaho, Montana, Oregon, Washington
  - Tiarella trifoliata var. unifoliata (Hook.) Kurtz: Alaska, Alberta, British Columbia, California, Idaho, Montana, Oregon, Washington
- Tiarella wherryi Lakela: Alabama, Georgia, Kentucky, Mississippi, Tennessee

== Distribution ==
Tiarella is native to Asia and North America. It has been introduced into Norway.

=== Asia ===
Tiarella polyphylla is an Asian species, ranging from the eastern Himalayas to China, east Asia, and southeast Asia. In China, it is found in moist forests and shady wet places at altitudes from 1,000 to 3,800 meters (3,300 to 12,500 ft).

=== Western North America ===
In western North America, Tiarella trifoliata ranges from California northward to Alaska, and eastward to Montana. Within this region, the varieties of T. trifoliata have overlapping ranges.

Canada:

- Alberta: T. t. var. trifoliata, T. t. var. unifoliata
- British Columbia: T. t. var. laciniata, T. t. var. trifoliata, T. t. var. unifoliata

United States:

- Alaska: T. t. var. trifoliata, T. t. var. unifoliata
- California: T. t. var. trifoliata, T. t. var. unifoliata
- Idaho: T. t. var. trifoliata, T. t. var. unifoliata
- Montana: T. t. var. trifoliata, T. t. var. unifoliata
- Oregon: T. t. var. laciniata, T. t. var. trifoliata, T. t. var. unifoliata
- Washington: T. t. var. laciniata, T. t. var. trifoliata, T. t. var. unifoliata

=== Eastern North America ===
In eastern North America, Tiarella cordifolia sensu lato is wide ranging, from northeastern Wisconsin across southeastern Canada to Nova Scotia, extending southward through the Appalachians into Alabama and Mississippi. The range of Tiarella cordifolia sensu stricto is narrowly confined to the East Coast of the United States from Maryland through Virginia and the Carolinas into Georgia.

At least one species of Tiarella occurs in each of 26 provinces and states. Multiple species of Tiarella occur in eight (8) states. Tiarella stolonifera occurs in 22 provinces and states, it being the only species of Tiarella in 17 of those provinces and states. Tiarella cordifolia sensu stricto occurs in just five (5) states, all of which have at least two Tiarella species. The ranges of Tiarella nautila, Tiarella wherryi, and Tiarella austrina overlap in Tennessee, North Carolina, and Georgia.

Canada:

- New Brunswick: T. stolonifera
- Nova Scotia: T. stolonifera
- Ontario: T. stolonifera
- Québec: T. stolonifera

United States:

- Alabama: T. austrina, T. wherryi
- Connecticut: T. stolonifera
- Georgia: T. austrina, T. cordifolia, T. nautila, T. wherryi
- Kentucky: T. stolonifera, T. wherryi
- Maine: T. stolonifera
- Maryland: T. cordifolia, T. stolonifera
- Massachusetts: T. stolonifera
- Michigan: T. stolonifera
- Mississippi: T. wherryi
- New Hampshire: T. stolonifera
- New Jersey: T. stolonifera
- New York: T. stolonifera
- North Carolina: T. austrina, T. cordifolia, T. nautila, T. stolonifera
- Ohio: T. stolonifera
- Pennsylvania: T. stolonifera
- Rhode Island: T. stolonifera
- South Carolina: T. austrina, T. cordifolia
- Tennessee: T. austrina, T. nautila, T. stolonifera, T. wherryi
- Vermont: T. stolonifera
- Virginia: T. cordifolia, T. stolonifera
- West Virginia: T. stolonifera
- Wisconsin: T. stolonifera

A disjunct population of Tiarella occurs in Stearns County, Minnesota but botanists believe it was introduced. That population is claimed to be T. stolonifera, but evidence is lacking.

== Conservation ==
In western North America, Tiarella trifoliata is globally secure (G5). Each variety is globally secure as well.

In eastern North America, Tiarella cordifolia sensu lato is globally secure (G5). It is frequent to common throughout most of its wide distribution but becomes rare at the edges of its range, in Wisconsin and the western Upper Peninsula of Michigan, Nova Scotia, New Jersey, and Mississippi.

== Cultivation ==
Many hybrids are known and cultivated. The following have been given the Royal Horticultural Society's Award of Garden Merit:

- Tiarella Angel Wings = 'Gowing'
- Tiarella 'Spring Symphony'
- Tiarella cordifolia
- Tiarella wherryi
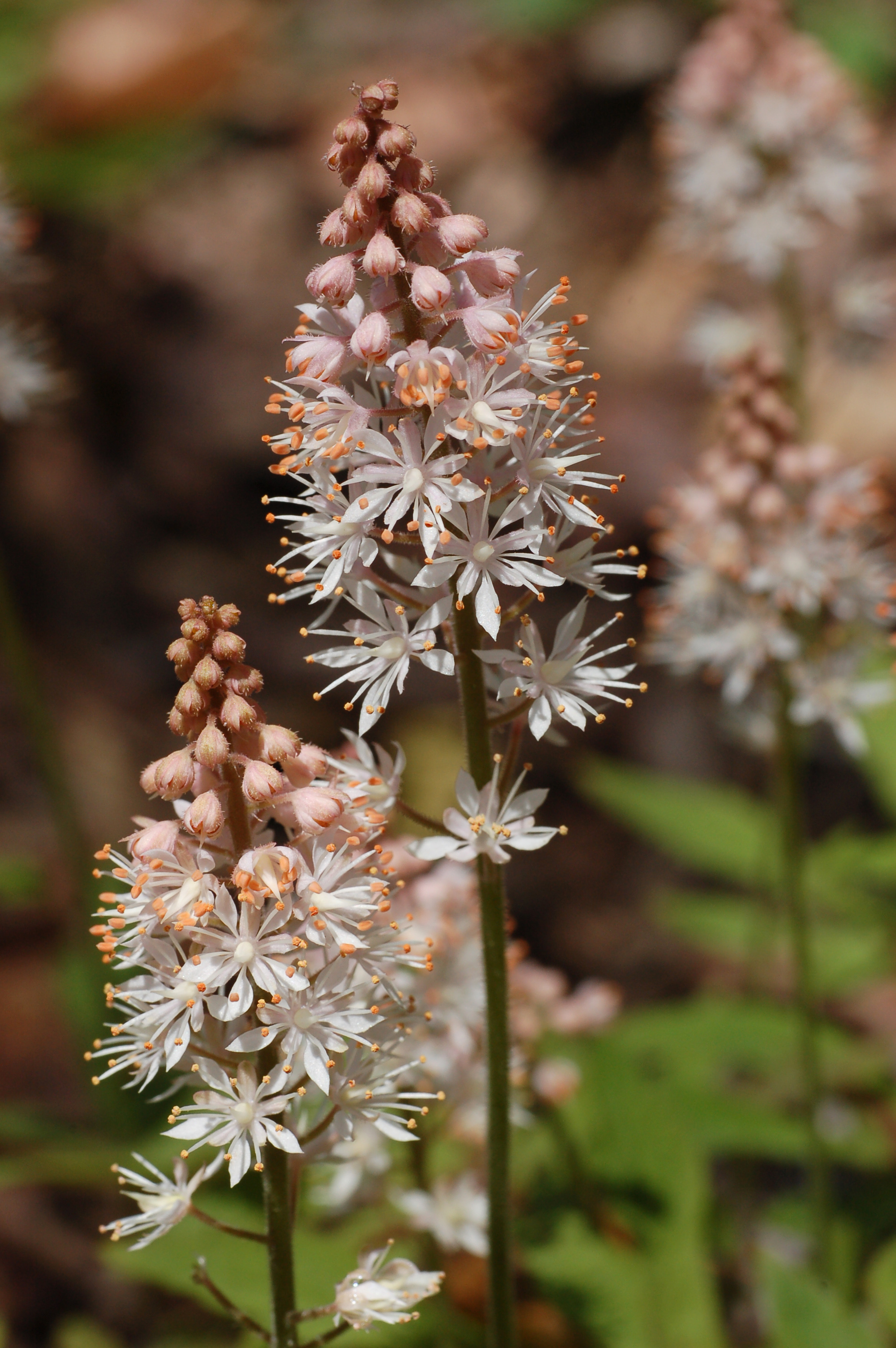
Tiarella 'Cygnet' flowers

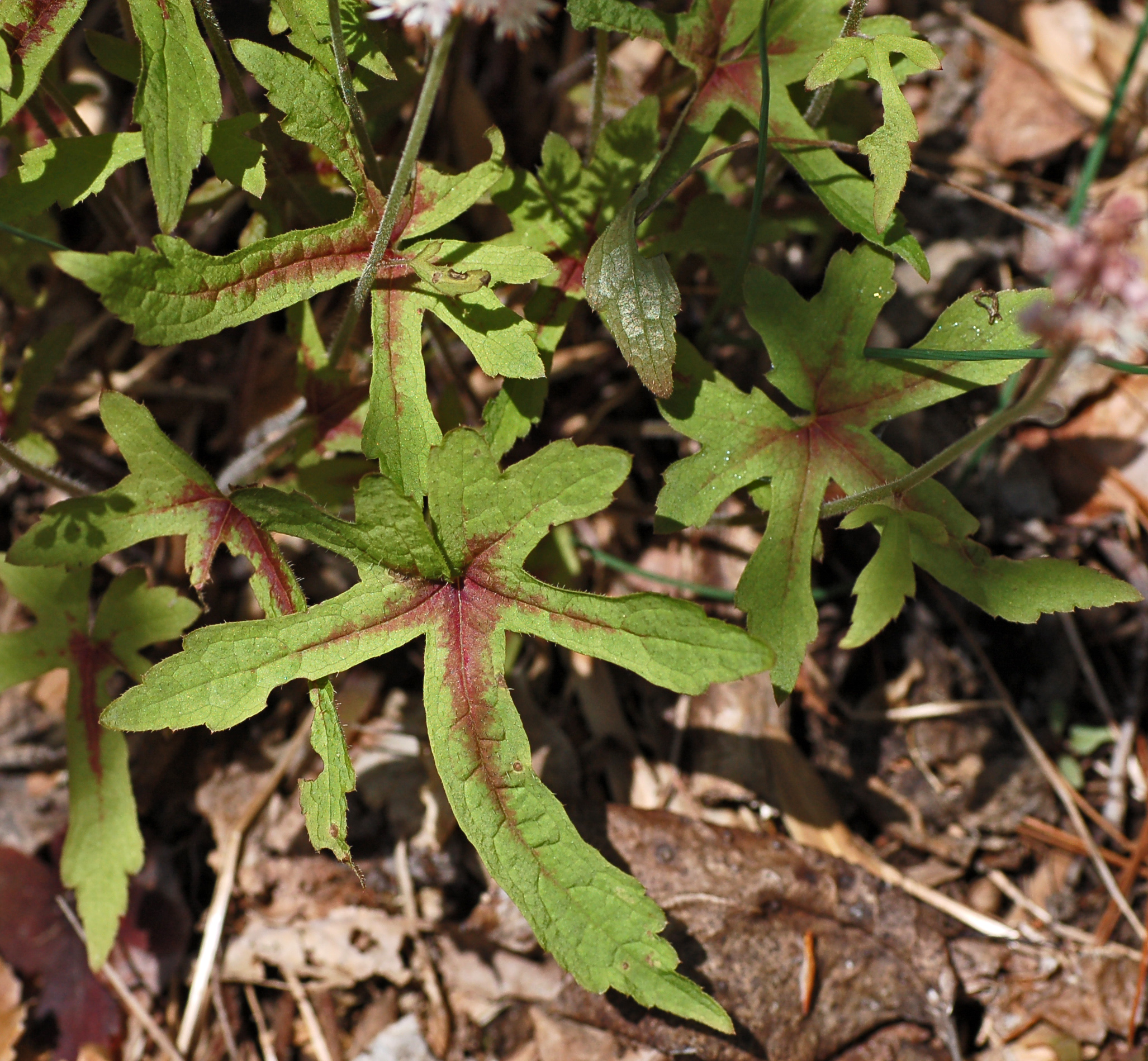
Tiarella 'Cygnet' leaves

== Bibliography ==
- Fernald, M. L. (1943). "Virginian botanizing under restrictions". Rhodora. 45: 445–449.
- Fields, Douglas; Brzeskiewicz, Marjory (2002). "Conservation Assessment for Heart-leaved Foam-flower (Tiarella cordifolia)" (PDF). USDA Forest Service, Eastern Region. Archived from the original (PDF) on March 3, 2017.
- Lakela, Olga (1937). "A monograph of the genus Tiarella L. in North America". Amer. J. Bot. 24 (6): 344–351. Bibcode:1937AmJB...24..344L. doi:10.1002/j.1537-2197.1937.tb09109.x.
- Nesom, Guy L. (2021). "Taxonomy of Tiarella (Saxifragaceae) in the eastern USA" (PDF). Phytoneuron. 31: 1–61. ISSN 2153-733X.
- Spongberg, Stephen A. (1972). "The genera of Saxifragaceae in the southeastern United States". Journal of the Arnold Arboretum. 53 (4): 409–498. doi:10.5962/p.324705. S2CID 88839907.
- Torrey, John; Gray, Asa (1840). Flora of North America, Volume 1. New York: Wiley & Putnam. pp. 1–711.
- Weakley, Alan S.; Southeastern Flora Team (2022). "Flora of the southeastern United States". University of North Carolina Herbarium, North Carolina Botanical Garden.
