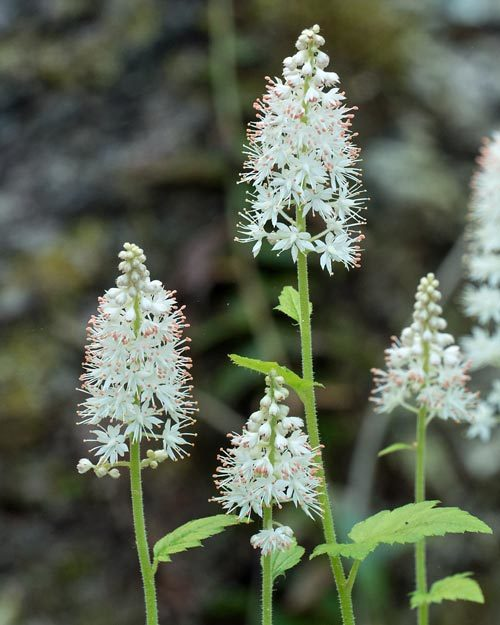
- Transylvania County, North Carolina, USA (April 24)

Scientific classification
- Kingdom: Plantae
- Clade: Tracheophytes
- Clade: Angiosperms
- Clade: Eudicots
- Order: Saxifragales
- Family: Saxifragaceae
- Genus: Tiarella
- Species: T. austrina

Binomial name
- Tiarella austrina (Lakela) G.L.Nesom

Synonyms
- T. austrina: Tiarella cordifolia var. austrina Lakela

= Tiarella austrina =

Species of flowering plant

Tiarella austrina is a species of flowering plant in the family Saxifragaceae. The specific name austrina means "from the south". Being endemic to the southeastern United States, it is sometimes referred to as the southern foamflower. It is one of two species of Tiarella that spread by stolons (the other being Tiarella stolonifera).

== Description ==
Tiarella austrina is a perennial, herbaceous plant with a short, slender rhizome. It has a leafy flowering stem and relatively large basal leaves with an extended terminal lobe. Most importantly, the species has the ability to produce stolons.

=== Identification ===
To positively identify Tiarella austrina, all of the following key features must be verified (in any order):

- Stolon present
- Basal leaves usually longer than wide
- Basal leaf lobes usually acute-acuminate with the terminal lobe prominently extended
- Flowering stem usually with 1–2 leaves or foliaceous bracts

The key features listed above are similar to those of Tiarella nautila but the presence of the stolon rules out that species.

== Taxonomy ==
In 1937, Olga Lakela described Tiarella cordifolia var. austrina, a variety of T. cordifolia with stolons. Guy Nesom raised this variety to species rank in 2021. Consequently, Tiarella cordifolia var. austrina Lakela is a basionym for Tiarella austrina (Lakela) G.L.Nesom.

== Distribution ==
In eastern North America, Tiarella austrina is narrowly endemic to the southeastern United States where it occurs mainly in the southern Blue Ridge Mountains of southwestern North Carolina, southeastern Tennessee, northeastern Georgia, and northwestern South Carolina. Counties where the species is known to occur include:

- Alabama: Jackson, Madison
- Georgia: Dawson, Habersham, Rabun, Stephens, Towns, White
- North Carolina: Buncombe, Cherokee, Clay, Graham, Haywood, Henderson, Jackson, Macon, Polk, Swain, Transylvania
- South Carolina: Greenville, Oconee, Pickens
- Tennessee: Blount, Cocke, Franklin, Monroe, Sevier

The ranges of Tiarella austrina and Tiarella nautila overlap in Georgia (Dawson, Towns, White), North Carolina (Cherokee), and Tennessee (Monroe). Both Tiarella austrina and Tiarella stolonifera occur in Buncombe County, North Carolina. A small disjunct population of T. austrina overlaps Tiarella wherryi in northeastern Alabama (Jackson, Madison) and adjacent south-central Tennessee (Franklin).

== Conservation ==
The global conservation status of Tiarella austrina is unknown. It is uncommon (S3) in North Carolina.

== Bibliography ==
- Lakela, Olga (1937). "A monograph of the genus Tiarella L. in North America". Amer. J. Bot. 24: 344–351.
- Nesom, Guy L. (2021). "Taxonomy of Tiarella (Saxifragaceae) in the eastern USA" (PDF). Phytoneuron. 31: 1–61. ISSN 2153-733X.
- Weakley, Alan S.; Southeastern Flora Team (2022). "Flora of the southeastern United States". University of North Carolina Herbarium, North Carolina Botanical Garden.
