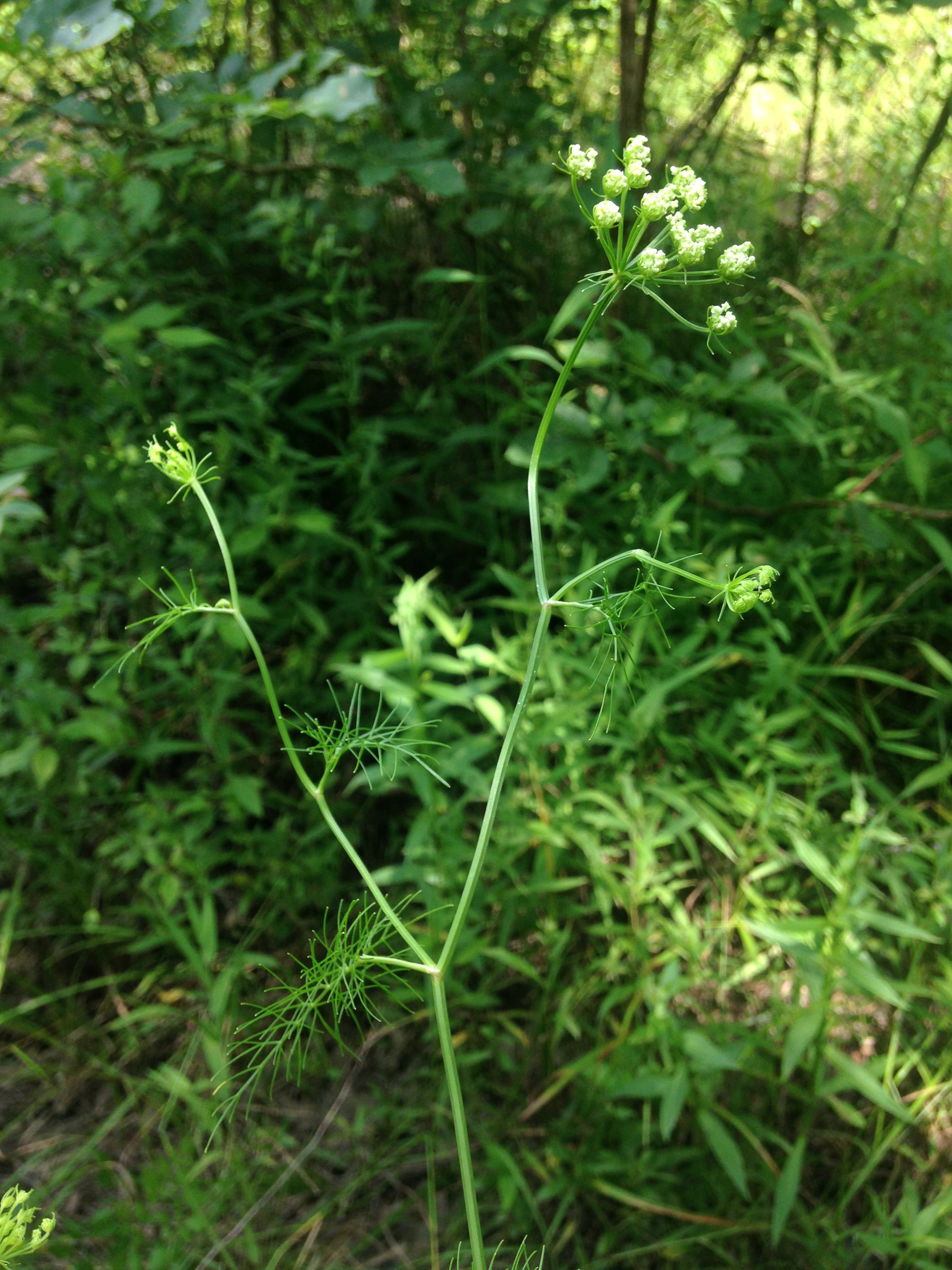

Scientific classification
- Kingdom: Plantae
- Clade: Tracheophytes
- Clade: Angiosperms
- Clade: Eudicots
- Clade: Asterids
- Order: Apiales
- Family: Apiaceae
- Genus: Ptilimnium
- Species: P. costatum

Binomial name
- Ptilimnium costatum (Elliott) Raf.

= Ptilimnium costatum =

Species of flowering plant

Ptilimnium costatum, commonly called ribbed mock bishopweed or big bishopweed, is a species of flowering plant in the carrot family (Apiaceae). It is native to the southeastern United States. It has a scattered and disjunct distribution, and is rare throughout its range. Its natural habitat in wetlands, such as swamps, marshes, and wet prairies.

Ptilimnium costatum is a robust perennial, growing to 150 cm tall. It produces umbels of small white flowers. It flowers and fruits from June to October, which is generally later in the season that other Ptilimnium in its range. In addition, it can be distinguished from other nearby Ptilimnium by its longer fruit styles (1–2 mm) and perennial habit from a corm base.

Populations that were previously considered Ptilimnium costatum in the West Gulf Coastal Plain of Arkansas, Louisiana, and Texas, have been treated as Ptilimnium texense as of 2010. This reinstatement was based on combination of molecular, morphological, and ecological evidence.
