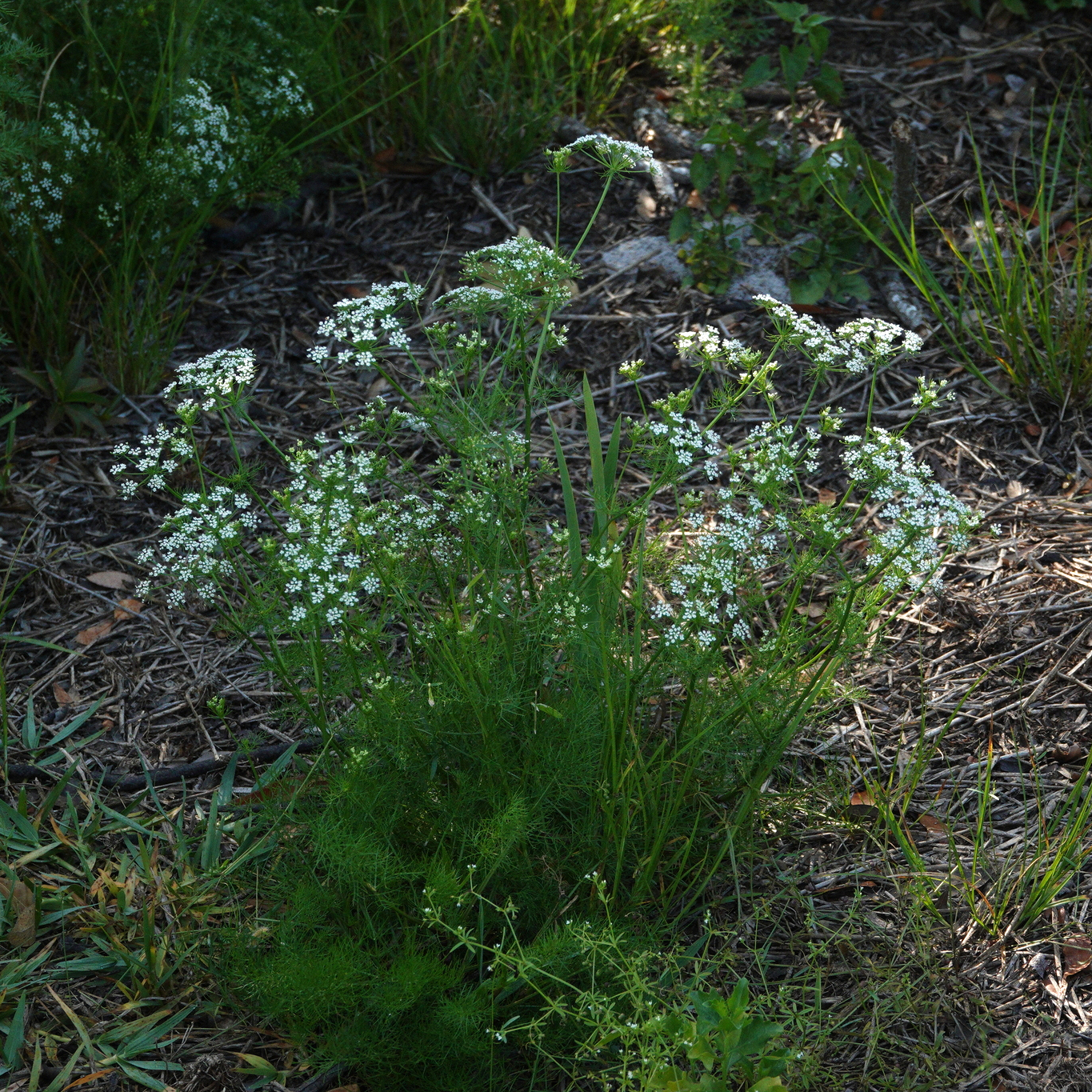

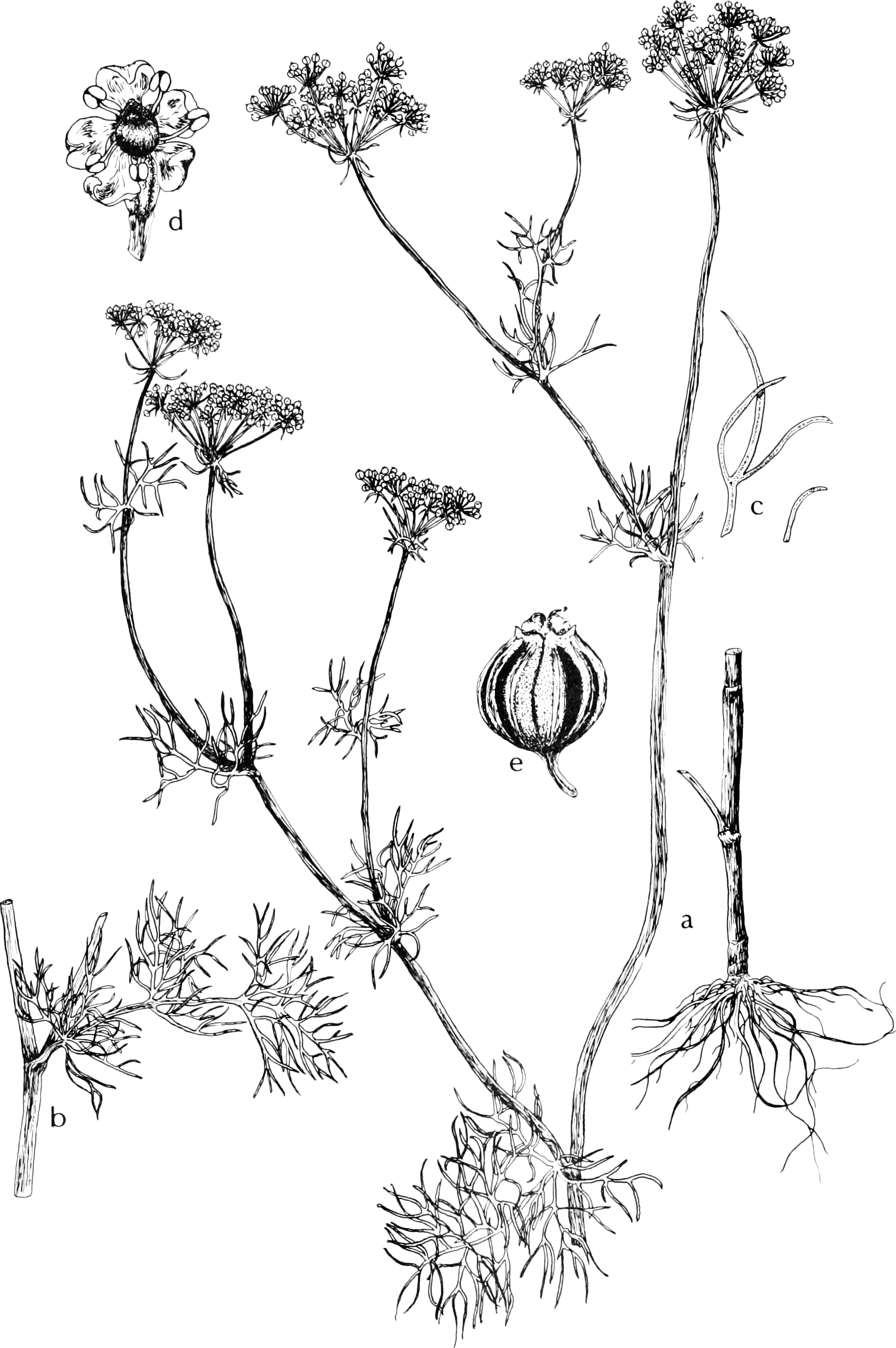

Scientific classification
- Kingdom: Plantae
- Clade: Tracheophytes
- Clade: Angiosperms
- Clade: Eudicots
- Clade: Asterids
- Order: Apiales
- Family: Apiaceae
- Genus: Ptilimnium
- Species: P. capillaceum

Binomial name
- Ptilimnium capillaceum (Michx.) Raf. (1830)
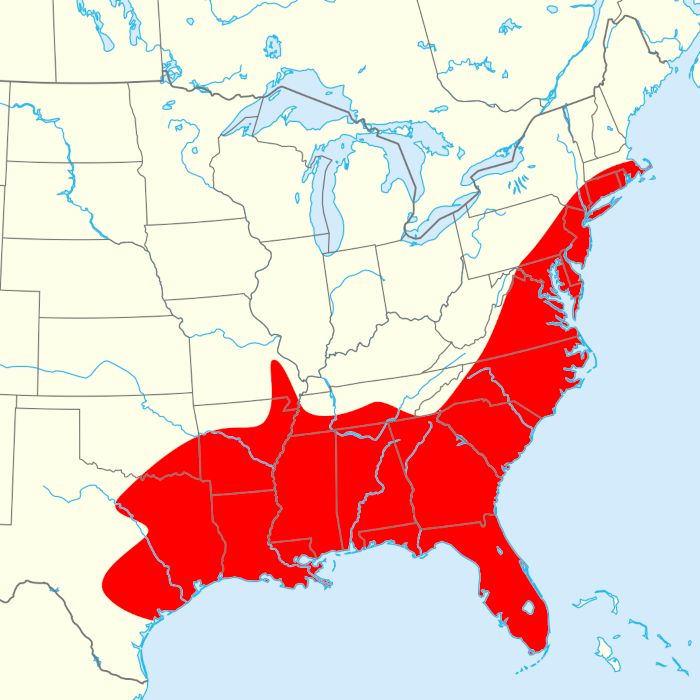
- General range of Ptilimnium capillaceum

Synonyms
- Ammi capillaceum Michx. (1803); Discopleura capillacea (Michx.) DC. (1829); Sison capillaceum (Michx.) Spreng. (1824); Ammi majus Walter (1788); Ammi rubricaule Hornem. (1813); Discopleura juncea (Raf.) Steud. (1840); Discopleura major Britton, Sterns & Poggenb. (1888); Ptilimnium junceum Raf. (1830); Sison rubricaule (Hornem.) Eaton & Wright (1840)

= Ptilimnium capillaceum =

Herbwilliam

Species of plant

Ptilimnium capillaceum, known by the common name of herbwilliam, is a member of the carrot family, Apiaceae. It is a perennial herb, native to the eastern United States, from Texas to Massachusetts.

== Description ==
P. capillaceum range between 1 and 8 decimeters (approximately 4 and 31 inches) in height. Leaves are pinnate.

== Distribution and habitat ==
This species' range encompasses eastern and central United States, stretching westward to Texas and south to Florida's Miami-Dade and Collier counties.

Within the United States' southeastern coastal plain, P. capillaceum occurs in wiregrass and slashpine habitats, flatwoods, and hammocks of various types. It grows in both shady and full sun location. Soil preferences range, including loamy sand, peaty soil, and clay.
