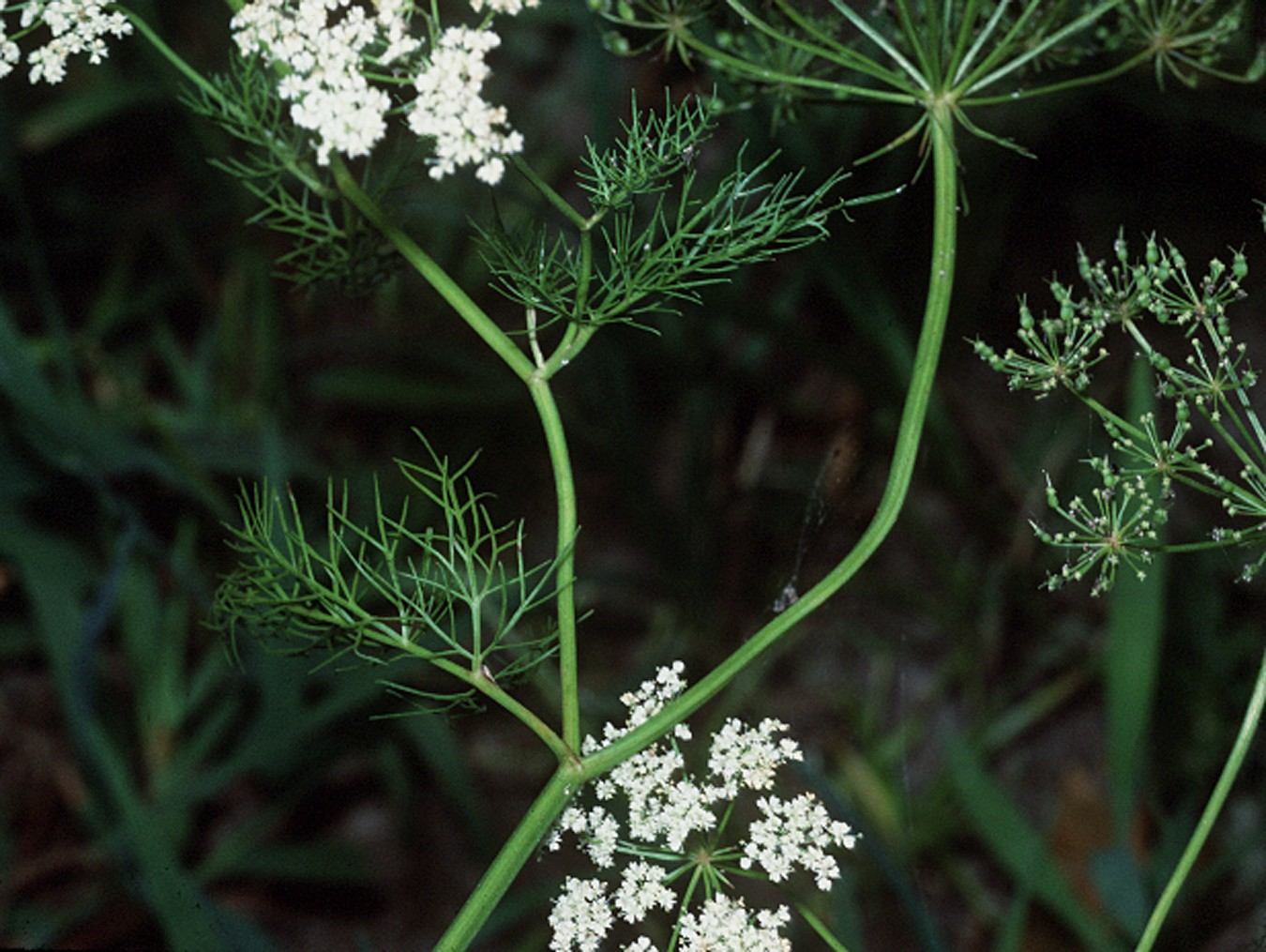
- Ptilimnium nuttallii

Scientific classification
- Kingdom: Plantae
- Clade: Tracheophytes
- Clade: Angiosperms
- Clade: Eudicots
- Clade: Asterids
- Order: Apiales
- Family: Apiaceae
- Subfamily: Apioideae
- Tribe: Oenantheae
- Genus: Ptilimnium; Raf.

Type species
- Ptilimnium capillaceum (Michx.) Raf.

Synonyms
- Discopleura DC.

= Ptilimnium =

Genus of plants

Ptilimnium is a group of plants in the family Apiaceae described as a genus in 1819. The common name is mock bishopweed or mock bishop's weed. It is endemic to the United States, primarily in the Southeast, the Lower Mississippi Valley, and the Lower Great Plains.

== Species ==
As of December 2022, Plants of the World Online accepted five species:

- Ptilimnium ahlesii Weakley & G.L.Nesom
- Ptilimnium capillaceum (Michx.) Raf. - SE + SC + NE USA
- Ptilimnium costatum (Elliott) Raf. - SC USA
- Ptilimnium nuttallii (DC.) Britton - SC USA
- Ptilimnium texense J.M. Coult. & Rose - Texas, Louisiana, Florida

Ptilimnium nodosum (Rose) Mathias, native to Georgia and South Carolina, is treated as Harperella nodosa by Plants of the World Online.
