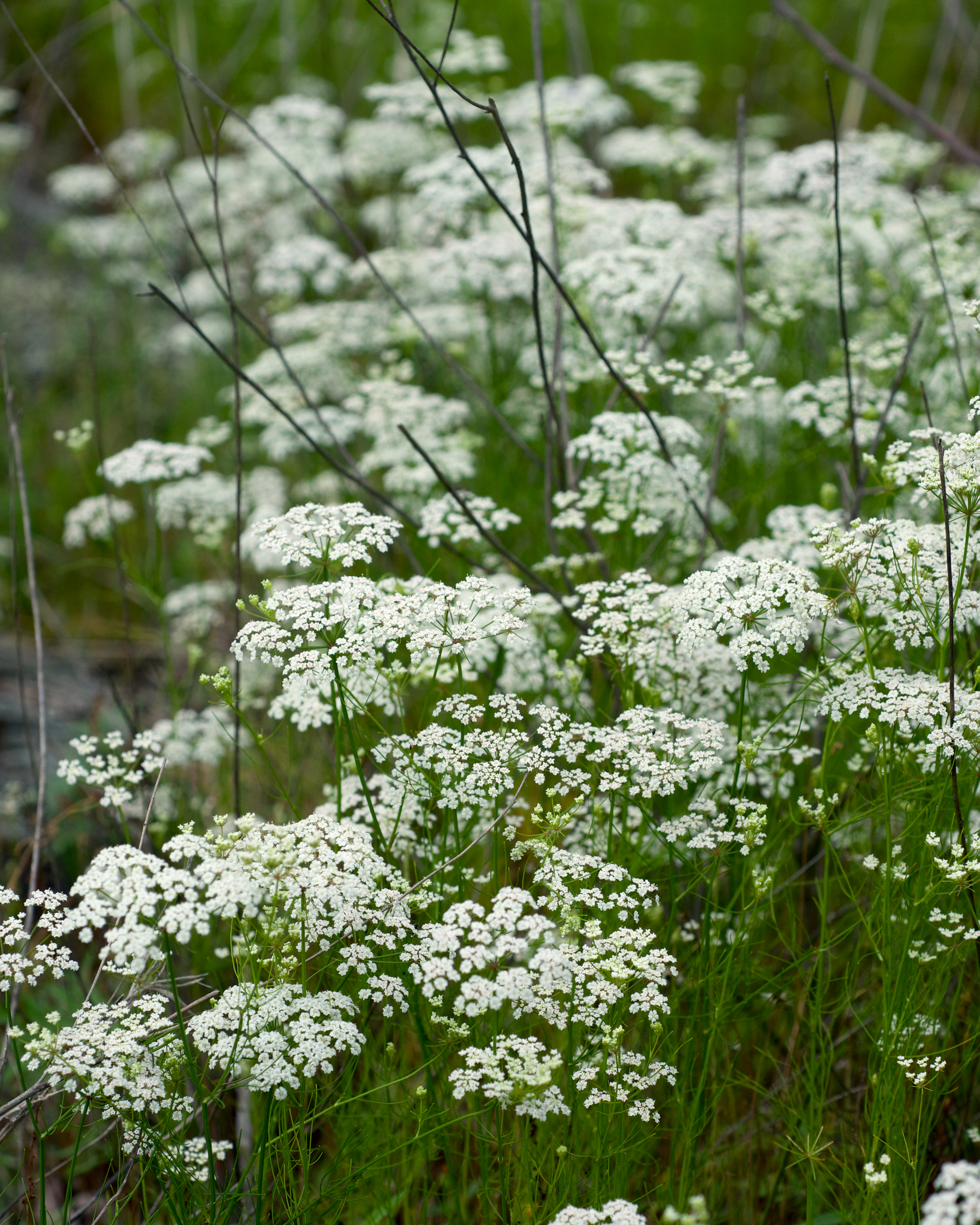

Scientific classification
- Kingdom: Plantae
- Clade: Tracheophytes
- Clade: Angiosperms
- Clade: Eudicots
- Clade: Asterids
- Order: Apiales
- Family: Apiaceae
- Genus: Ptilimnium
- Species: P. nuttallii

Binomial name
- Ptilimnium nuttallii (DC.) Britton

= Ptilimnium nuttallii =

Species of flowering plant

Ptilimnium nuttallii, commonly called laceflower, is a species of plant in the family Apiaceae that is native to the south-central United States.

It annually produces white flowers in the spring.
