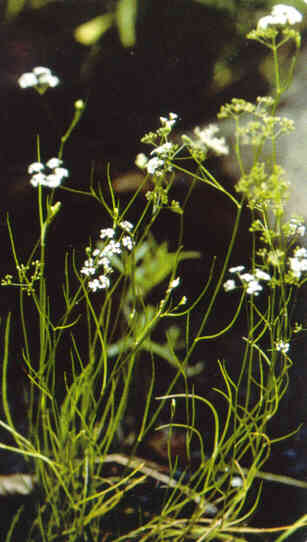

Conservation status
- Imperiled (NatureServe)

- Endangered (ESA)

Scientific classification
- Kingdom: Plantae
- Clade: Tracheophytes
- Clade: Angiosperms
- Clade: Eudicots
- Clade: Asterids
- Order: Apiales
- Family: Apiaceae
- Subfamily: Apioideae
- Tribe: Oenantheae
- Genus: Harperella; Rose
- Species: H. nodosa

Binomial name
- Harperella nodosa Rose (Rose)

Synonyms
- Genus: Harperia Rose, nom. illeg.; Species: Carum nodosum (Rose) Koso-Pol.; Harperia nodosa Rose, nom. illeg.; Ptilimnium nodosum (Rose) Mathias; Carum viviparum (Rose) Koso-Pol.; Harperella fluviatilis Rose; Harperella vivipara Rose; Ptilimnium fluviatile (Rose) Mathias; Ptilimnium viviparum (Rose) Mathias

= Harperella =

Genus of flowering plants

Harperella is a monotypic genus of flowering plants in the family Apiaceae. Its only species is Harperella nodosa (synonym Ptilimnium nodosum), known as piedmont mock bishopweed and harperella. It is native to riparian environments in the Southeastern United States, found at sites in West Virginia, Maryland, several Southeastern states such as Alabama and North Carolina, and the Ouachita National Forest in Arkansas and Oklahoma. As Ptilimnium nodosum, it was placed on the United States' Endangered Species List in 1988.

== Taxonomy ==
The genus was first described by Joseph Nelson Rose in 1905 under the name Harperia. However, this was a later homonym of a genus in the family Restionaceae, and so illegitimate. In 1906, Rose published the replacement name Harperella.
