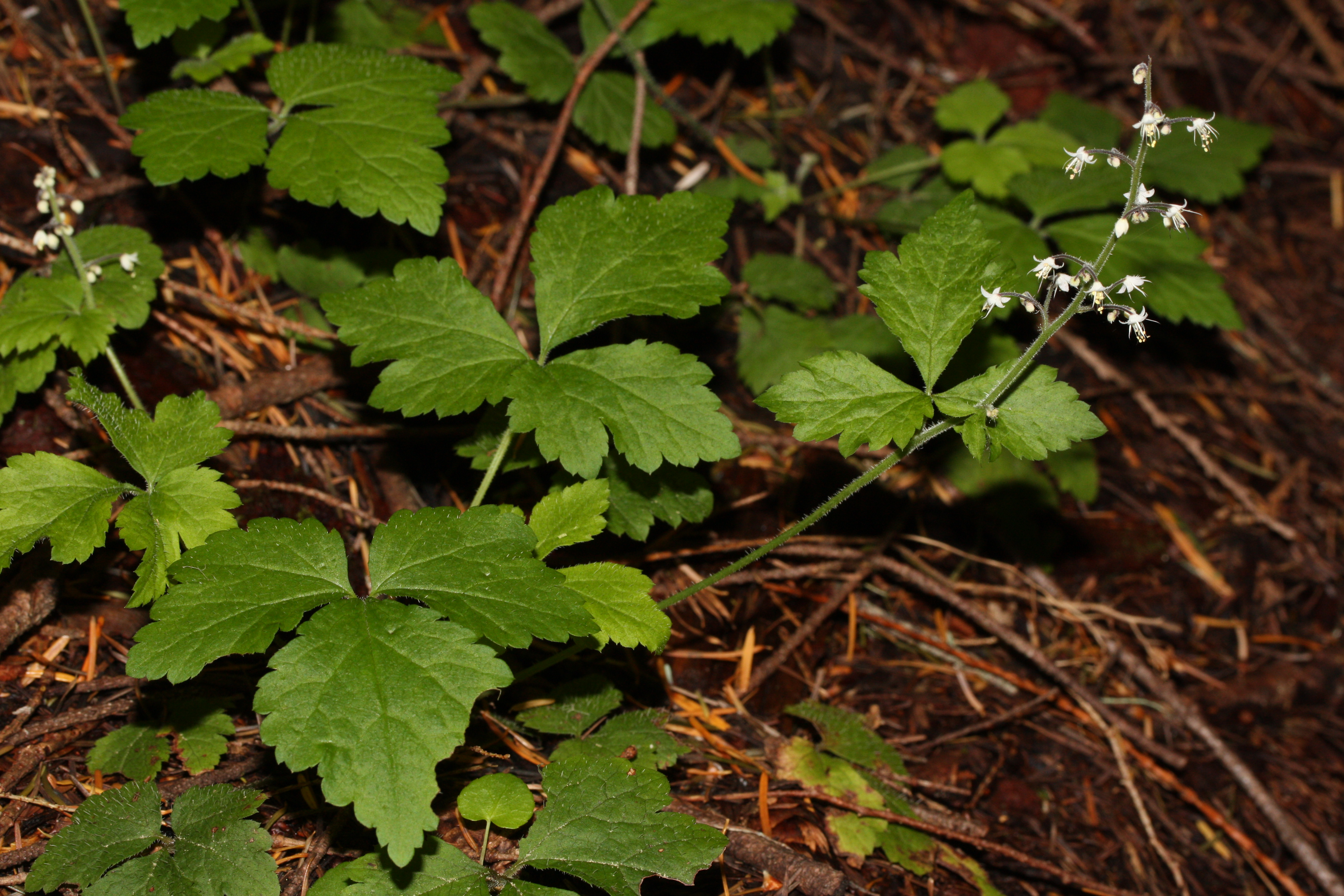
- Mount Baker-Snoqualmie National Forest, State of Washington, USA (23 June)

Conservation status
- Secure (NatureServe)

Scientific classification
- Kingdom: Plantae
- Clade: Tracheophytes
- Clade: Angiosperms
- Clade: Eudicots
- Order: Saxifragales
- Family: Saxifragaceae
- Genus: Tiarella
- Species: T. trifoliata

Binomial name
- Tiarella trifoliata L.

Synonyms
- T. trifoliata var. laciniata: Tiarella laciniata Hook.; Heuchera californica Kellogg; Tiarella californica (Kellogg) Rydb.; T. trifoliata var. trifoliata: Blondia trifoliata Raf.; Petalosteira laciniata Raf.; Tiarella stenopetala C.Presl; Tiarella trifolia J.F.Gmel.; T. trifoliata var. unifoliata: Petalosteira unifolia (Hook.) Raf.; Tiarella trifoliata subsp. unifoliata (Hook.) P.M.Kern; Tiarella unifoliata Hook.; Tiarella unifoliata f. typica Lakela; Tiarella unifoliata f. trisecta Lakela

= Tiarella trifoliata =

Species of flowering plant

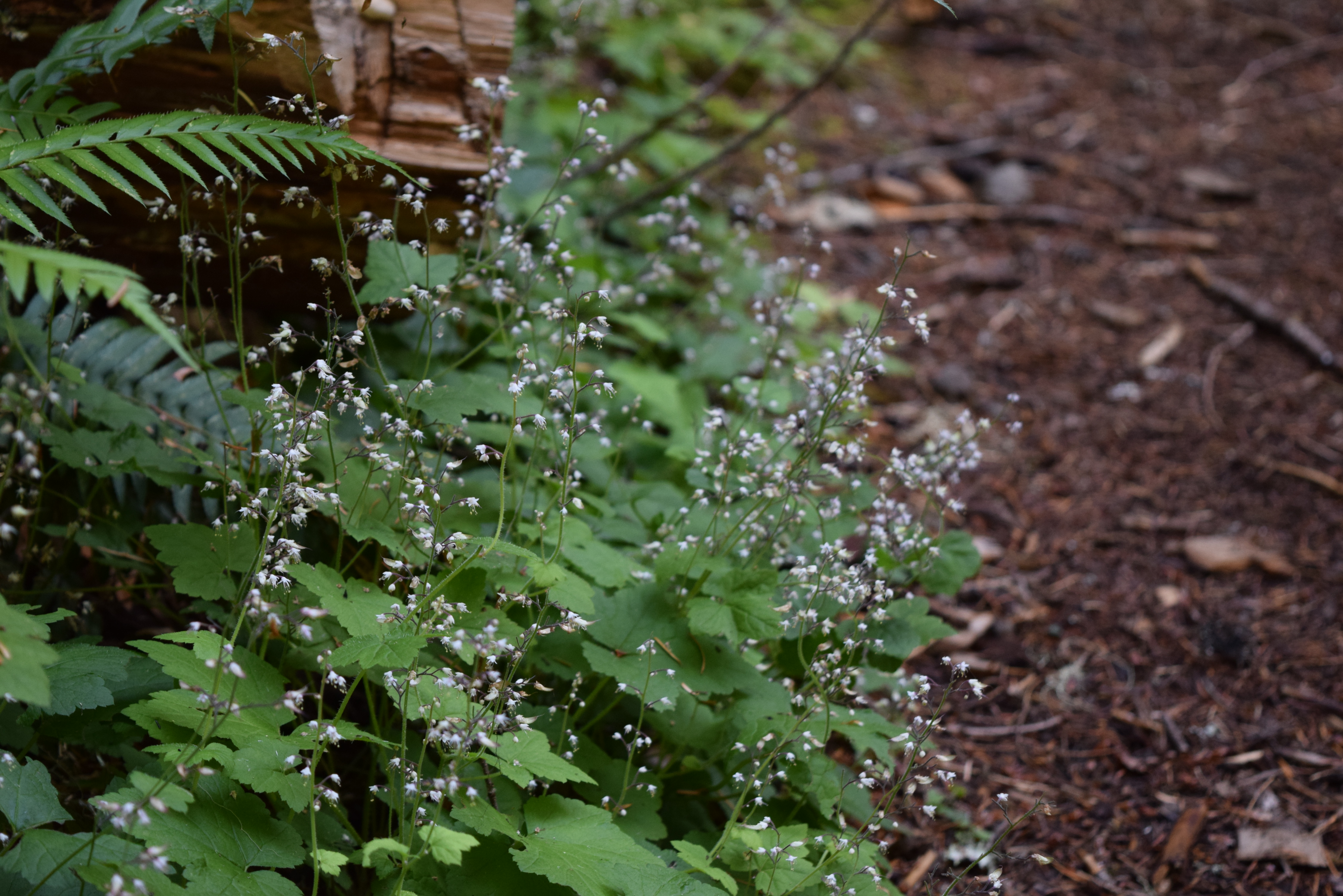
Salmon-Huckleberry Wilderness, Mount Hood National Forest, Oregon, USA (23 August)

Tiarella trifoliata, the three-leaf foamflower, is a species of flowering plant in the family Saxifragaceae. The specific name trifoliata means "having three leaflets", a characteristic of two of the three recognized varieties. Also known as the laceflower or sugar-scoop, the species is found in shaded, moist woods in western North America.

== Description ==
Tiarella trifoliata is a perennial dicotyledonous herb that flowers in the late spring. The flowers are bell-shaped, white and solitary forming an elongated, leafless panicle. The calyx lobes are 1.5–2.5 mm and petals are 3–4 mm. Basal leaves are 15–80 mm long and up to 120 mm wide, trifoliate or palmately 3- to 5-lobed. Cauline leaves are infrequent and much smaller.

The typical variety of Tiarella trifoliata (var. trifoliata) has petiolate leaves with three leaflets per leaf (i.e., trifoliate). The cut-leaved foamflower (var. laciniata) also has trifoliate leaves with petioles, but unlike the typical variety, it has deep lobes more than half the length of the leaflet. The one-leaf foamflower (var. unifoliata) has sessile, simple leaves (rarely trifoliate).

== Taxonomy ==
Tiarella trifoliata was first described by the Swedish botanist Carl Linnaeus in 1753. Its type specimen was collected by Georg Steller on Cape St. Elias, Kayak Island, Alaska in 1742, but that specimen is now lost. A specimen collected from Sitka, Alaska has been designated as the neotype for this species.

In 1832, William Hooker described two additional species of Tiarella in western North America (T. laciniata and T. unifoliata), including two hand-drawn illustrations in his description. John Torrey and Asa Gray recognized all three species (T. trifoliata, T. laciniata, T. unifoliata) in their treatment of genus Tiarella in 1840.

In 1905, Per Axel Rydberg described T. californica based on an earlier description of a species thought to belong to genus Heuchera. All four species (T. trifoliata, T. laciniata, T. unifoliata, T. californica) were included in a taxonomy proposed by Olga Lakela in 1937.

Based on Hooker's species description, William Efner Wheelock renamed T. laciniata Hook. as a variety of Tiarella trifoliata (var. laciniata) in 1896. Similarly, Federico Kurtz renamed T. unifoliata Hook. as Tiarella trifoliata var. unifoliata in 1894. Flora of North America recognized the varieties (var. laciniata and var. unifoliata) in an influential treatment of genus Tiarella published in 2009. As of October 2022, the varieties (not the species) are widely recognized:

- Tiarella trifoliata L.
  - Tiarella trifoliata var. laciniata (Hook.) Wheelock (synonym: T. laciniata Hook.)
  - Tiarella trifoliata var. trifoliata
  - Tiarella trifoliata var. unifoliata (Hook.) Kurtz (synonym: T. unifoliata Hook.)

Likewise Tiarella californica (Kellogg) Rydb. is considered to be a synonym of T, trifoliata var. laciniata.

== Distribution ==
In western North America, Tiarella trifoliata prefers shaded, moist, sometimes dense woods up to 1,900 m (6,234 ft). It ranges from northern California through western Canada northward to Alaska, and eastward to Montana. Within this region, the varieties of T. trifoliata have overlapping ranges:

- Tiarella trifoliata var. laciniata: British Columbia; Oregon, Washington
- Tiarella trifoliata var. trifoliata: Alberta, British Columbia; Alaska, California, Idaho, Montana, Oregon, Washington
- Tiarella trifoliata var. unifoliata: Alberta, British Columbia; Alaska, California, Idaho, Montana, Oregon, Washington

T. trifoliata var. trifoliata and T. trifoliata var. unifoliata range north to Alaska, while T. trifoliata var. laciniata only ranges as far north as Vancouver Island in British Columbia.

== Conservation ==
The conservation status of Tiarella trifoliata is globally secure (G5). Each variety is secure as well.

== Bibliography ==
- Lakela, Olga (1937). "A monograph of the genus Tiarella L. in North America". Amer. J. Bot. 24 (6): 344–351. Bibcode:1937AmJB...24..344L. doi:10.1002/j.1537-2197.1937.tb09109.x.
- Torrey, John; Gray, Asa (1840). Flora of North America, Volume 1. New York: Wiley & Putnam. pp. 1–711.
