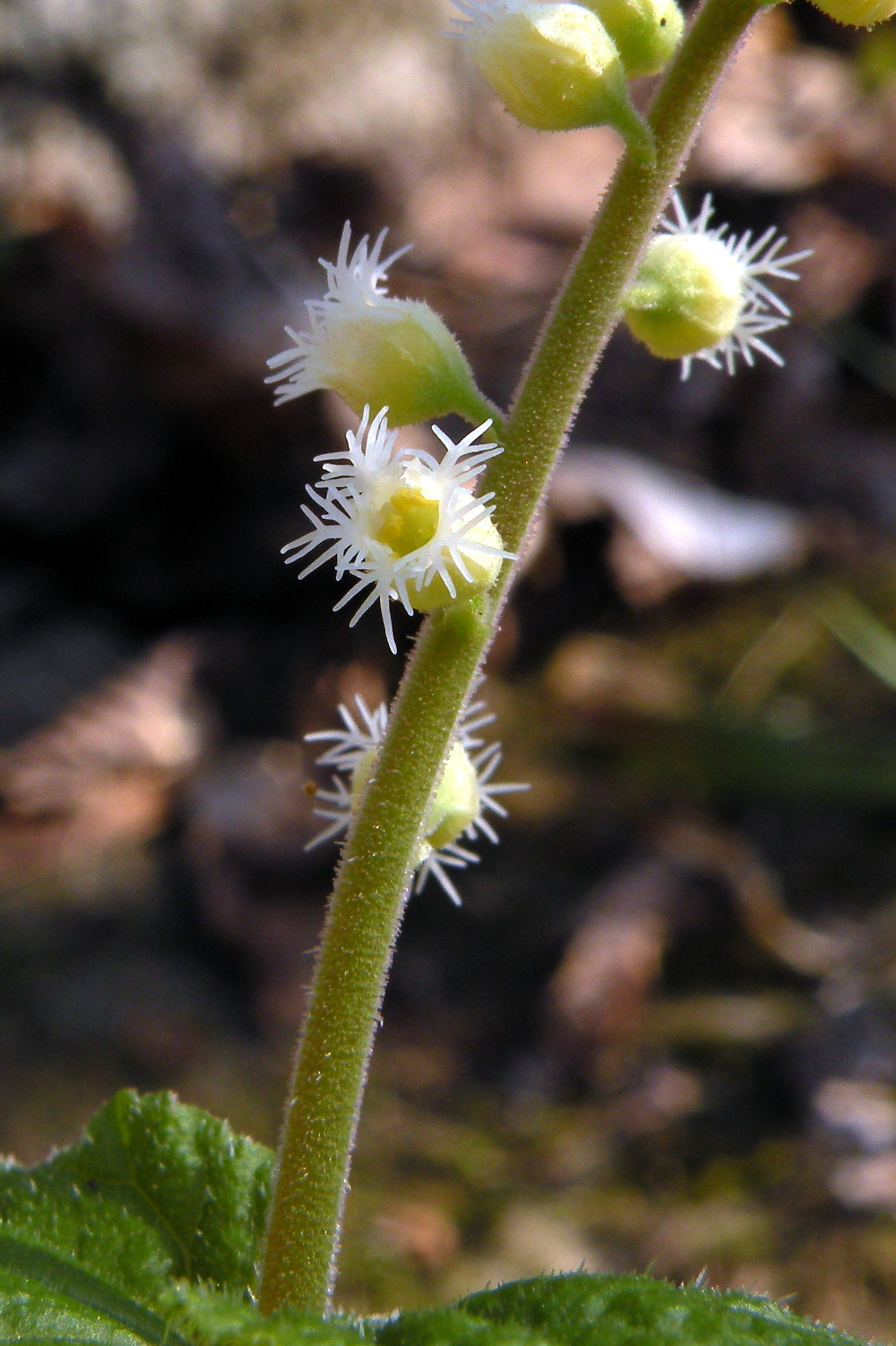
- Mitella diphylla in Hector, New York

Scientific classification
- Kingdom: Plantae
- Clade: Tracheophytes
- Clade: Angiosperms
- Clade: Eudicots
- Order: Saxifragales
- Family: Saxifragaceae
- Genus: Mitella
- Species: M. diphylla

Binomial name
- Mitella diphylla L.

= Mitella diphylla =

Two-leaved miterwort

Species of flowering plant

Mitella diphylla (twoleaf miterwort, two-leaved mitrewort, or bishop's cap) is a clump forming, open woodland plant native to northeast and midwest regions of North America.

== Description ==
Miterwort grows from a rhizomatous root system with fibrous roots. Leaves are coarsely toothed with 3-5 shallow lobes. Most leaves are basal, and there is one opposite pair of stemless leaves on each flower stalk.

Tiny flowers with finely divided, lacy white petals are produced in mid-spring in racemes on stems growing from 20 to 50 cm (8 to 20 in) tall.

The seeds are tiny, 1.2–1.6 mm (0.05–0.06 in), produced in small green cups, formed from the sepals of the flower, and when ripe are shiny and black. They are spread when raindrops hit the cups and splash the seeds out.

It grows in high quality mesic forests on moist, mossy ledges and north-facing slopes. The Latin specific epithet diphylla means two-leaved and is in reference to the non-basal leaves.

== Ecology ==
The flowers produce both pollen and nectar. Due to their small size, they are mainly visited by small bees and flies: for instance, Lasioglossum sweat bees, small carpenter bees (Ceratina) and hoverflies.

== Cultivation ==
This species is grown as an ornamental plant in shade gardens. It prefers wet-mesic to dry soil and partial shade.
