= Olga Lakela =

Finnish-American botanist (1890-1980)

Olga Korhoven Lakela (March 11, 1890 – May 17, 1980) was a Finnish-American botanist and educator who identified many species in the genera Heuchera and Tiarella.

She emigrated to the United States from Finland in 1906. Lakela received her doctorate in botany from the University of Minnesota in 1932. Lakela founded the herbarium at the University of Minnesota Duluth, which is named after her, and worked there until 1935.

After her retirement from the University of Minnesota Duluth in 1958, she taught for a year at the University of North Dakota and was then the curator of the University of South Florida's herbarium from 1960 until her retirement there in 1973.
