= Asimitellaria amamiana =

Scientific classification
- Kingdom: Plantae
- Clade: Tracheophytes
- Clade: Angiosperms
- Clade: Eudicots
- Order: Saxifragales
- Family: Saxifragaceae
- Genus: Asimitellaria
- Species: A. amamiana

Binomial name
- Asimitellaria amamiana (Y.Okuyama) R.A.Folk & Y.Okuyama

Synonyms
- Mitella amamiana (basionym)

Species of plant

Asimitellaria amamiana (アマミチャルメルソウ, Amami-charumerusō) is a species of flowering plant in the family Saxifragaceae that is endemic to Amami Ōshima in the Amami Islands of Kagoshima Prefecture, Japan.

== Taxonomy ==
Discovered by researchers on Amami Ōshima in March 2011, the species was first described, as Mitella amamiana, by Japanese botanist Yudai Okuyama in 2016. Asimitellaria, a section erected by Michio Wakabayashi in the genus Mitella in 2001, was elevated to genus rank in 2021, the new combination being Asimitellaria amamiana. The specific epithet relates to the type locality (Amami Ōshima) in the Amami Islands.

== Description ==
Asimitellaria amamiana is a perennial plant with green filaments and yellow anthers found growing on wet rock walls in the vicinity of low waterfalls in the evergreen forest of Amami-Ōshima, at an elevation of some 300–430 metres (980–1,410 ft). It is similar to but somewhat larger than Asimitellaria doiana, endemic to Yakushima (north of the Tokara Gap), previously believed to be the southernmost domestic species of the genus, which is characterized as having "low dispersability.

== Conservation status ==
Found in a restricted range on only one island and with a population estimated at less than 1,000, Mitella amamiana (the basionym) is classed as Critically Endangered on the Ministry of the Environment Red List. As of 2016, the only botanical garden in the world where the species could be found was the Tsukuba Botanical Garden in Ibaraki Prefecture, although there were plans to propagate and distribute the plant to other botanical gardens in Japan, to reduce the likelihood of extinction.

== See also ==
- Amami Guntō National Park
