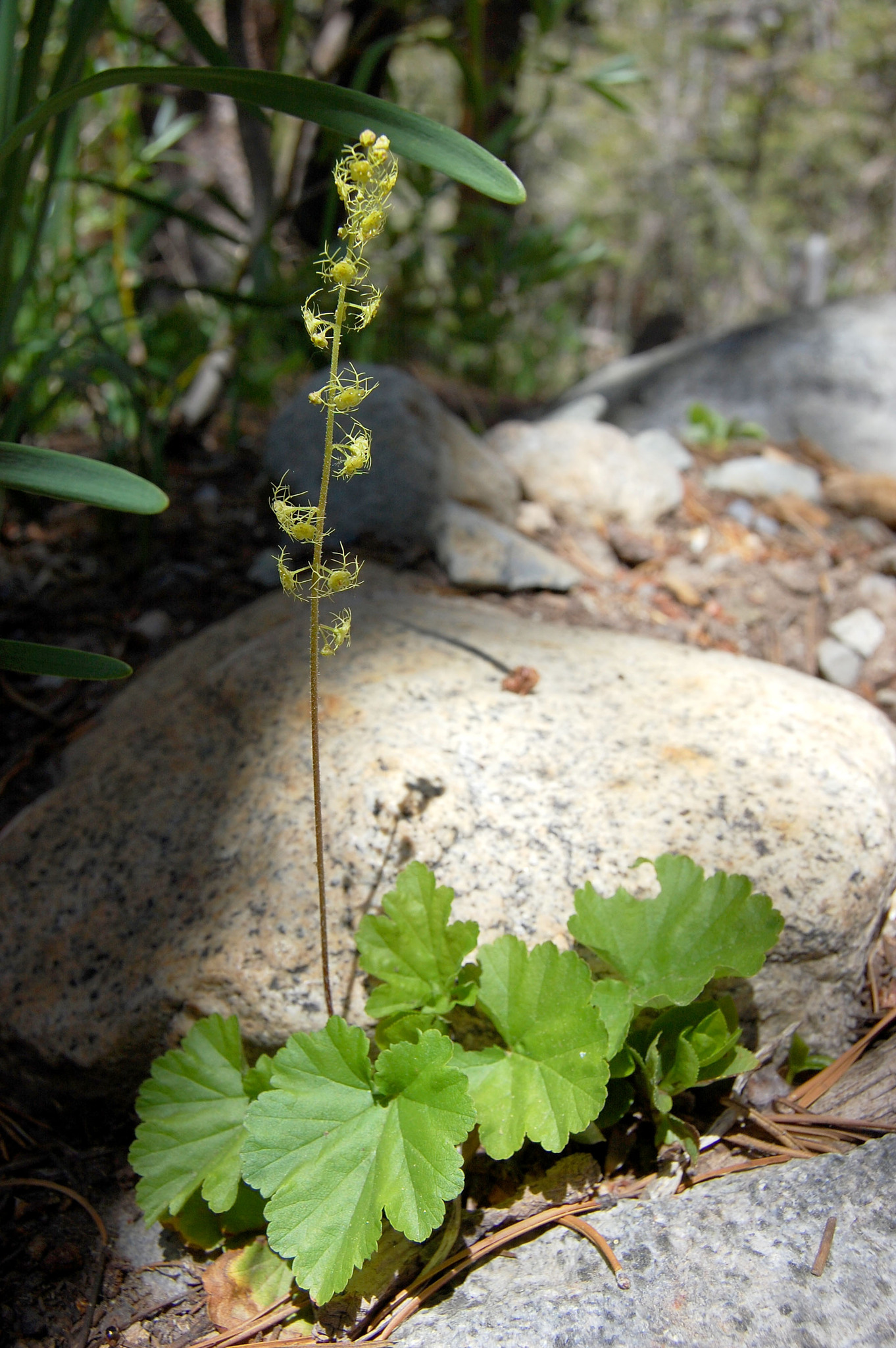
- Brewerimitella breweri

Scientific classification
- Kingdom: Plantae
- Clade: Embryophytes
- Clade: Tracheophytes
- Clade: Spermatophytes
- Clade: Angiosperms
- Clade: Eudicots
- Order: Saxifragales
- Family: Saxifragaceae
- Tribe: Heuchereae
- Genus: Brewerimitella (Engl.) R.A.Folk & Y.Okuyama (2021)

Species
- Brewerimitella breweri (A.Gray) R.A.Folk & Y.Okuyama; Brewerimitella ovalis (Greene) R.A.Folk & Y.Okuyama

= Brewerimitella =

Genus of flowering plants

Brewerimitella is a genus of flowering plants in the saxifrage family, Saxifragaceae. It includes two species of perennials native to western North America, ranging from California and Nevada to Montana, Alberta, and British Columbia.

- Brewerimitella breweri (A.Gray) R.A.Folk & Y.Okuyama – Alberta, British Columbia, California, Idaho, Montana, Nevada, Oregon, and Washington
- Brewerimitella ovalis (Greene) R.A.Folk & Y.Okuyama – British Columbia, California, Oregon, and Washington

Both species were previously included in genus Mitella.
