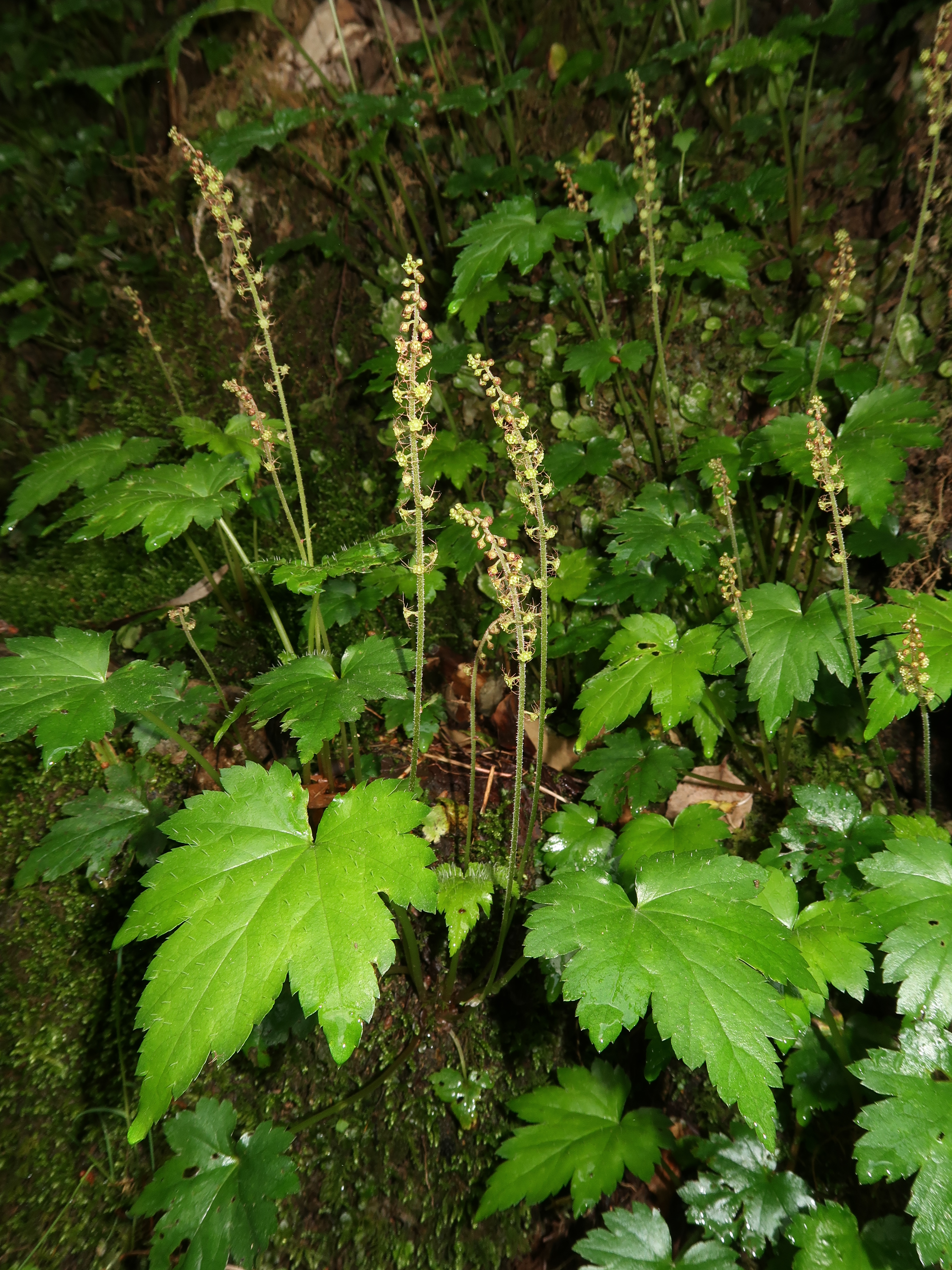
- Asimitellaria acerina

Scientific classification
- Kingdom: Plantae
- Clade: Tracheophytes
- Clade: Angiosperms
- Clade: Eudicots
- Clade: Superrosids
- Order: Saxifragales
- Family: Saxifragaceae
- Genus: Asimitellaria (Wakab.) R.A.Folk & Y.Okuyama

Synonyms
- Mitella sect. Asimitellaria

= Asimitellaria =

Genus of flowering plants

Asimitellaria is a genus of flowering plants in the family Saxifragaceae that is native to Japan and Taiwan. Formerly a section in the genus Mitella, Asimitellaria was elevated to genus rank in 2021.

== Species ==
As of April 2021, species include:

- Asimitellaria acerina (Makino) R.A.Folk & Y.Okuyama
- Asimitellaria amamiana (Y.Okuyama) R.A.Folk & Y.Okuyama
- Asimitellaria doiana (Ohwi) R.A.Folk & Y.Okuyama
- Asimitellaria formosana (Hayata) R.A.Folk & Y.Okuyama
- Asimitellaria furusei (Ohwi) R.A.Folk & Y.Okuyama
- Asimitellaria japonica (Maxim.) R.A.Folk & Y.Okuyama
- Asimitellaria kiusiana (Makino) R.A.Folk & Y.Okuyama
- Asimitellaria koshiensis (Ohwi) R.A.Folk & Y.Okuyama
- Asimitellaria pauciflora (Rosend.) R.A.Folk & Y.Okuyama
- Asimitellaria stylosa (H.Boissieu) R.A.Folk & Y.Okuyama
- Asimitellaria yoshinagae (Hara) R.A.Folk & Y.Okuyama
