= Hypanthium =

Structure in angiosperms where basal portions form a cup-shaped tube

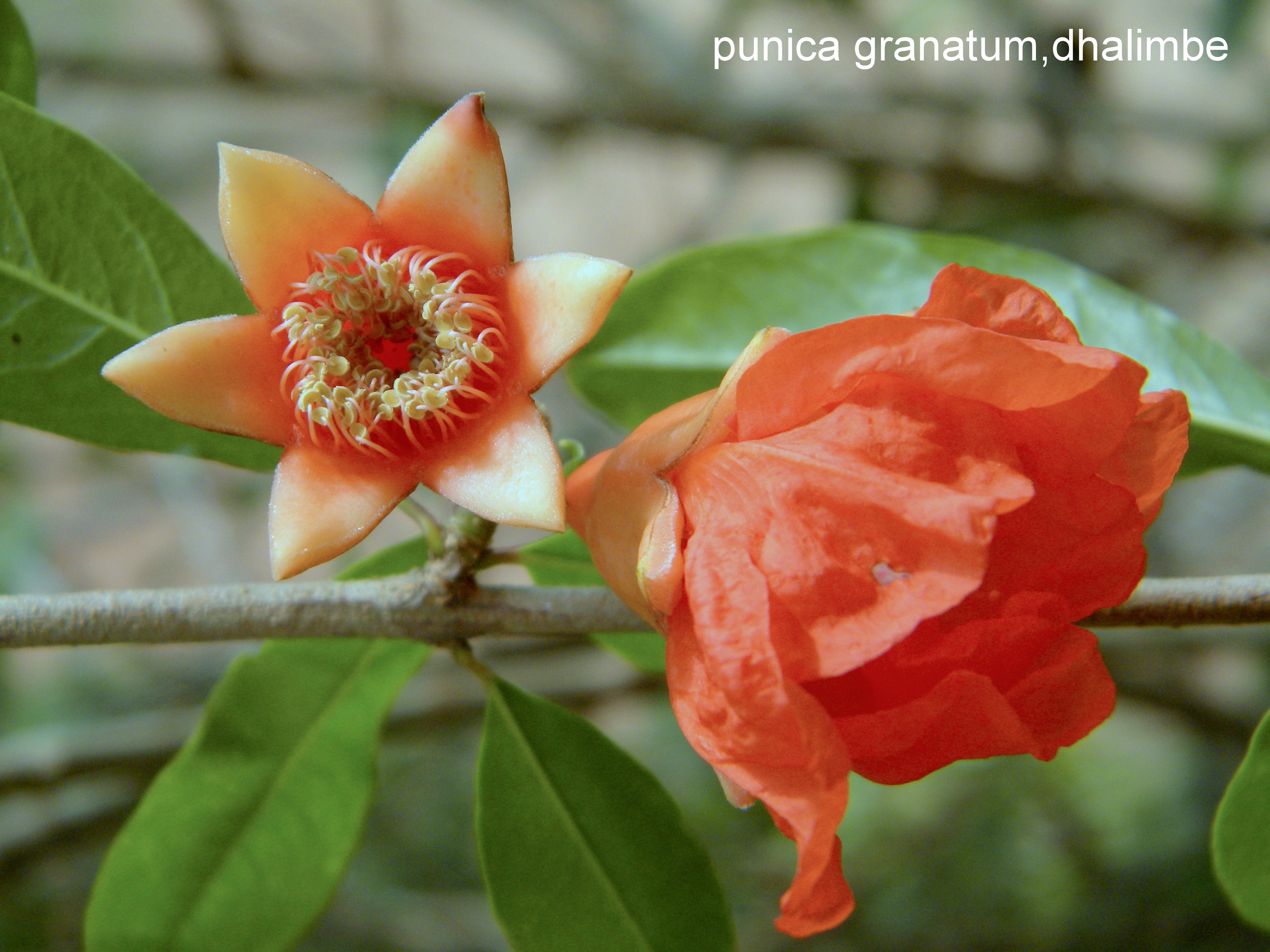
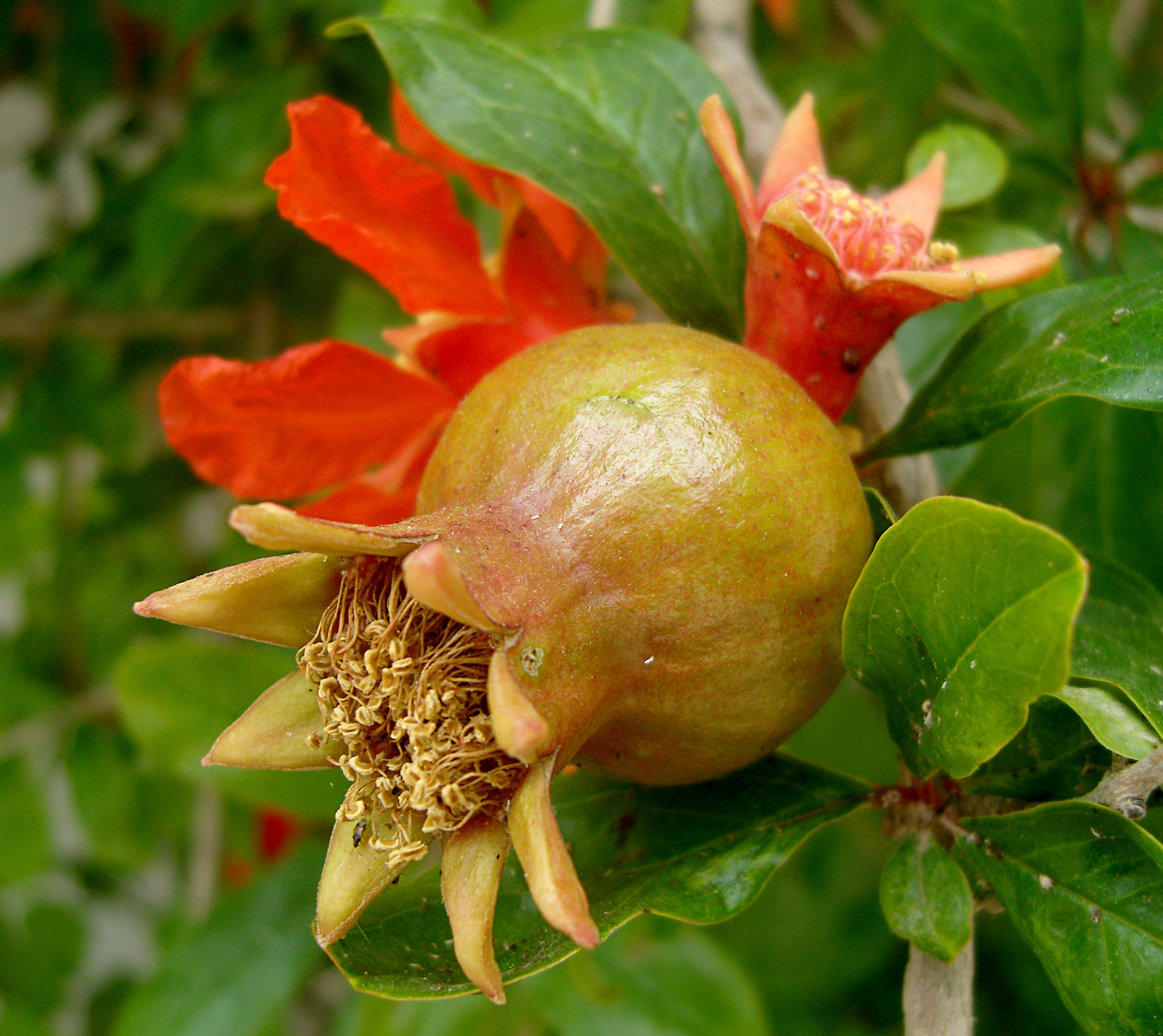
In a pomegranate flower, Punica granatum, the petals, except for their fused bases, soon fall. The hypanthium with sepal lobes and stamens still attached develops to form the outer layer of the fruit.

In angiosperms, a hypanthium or floral cup is a structure where basal portions of the calyx, the corolla, and the stamens form a cup-shaped tube. It is sometimes called a floral tube, a term that is also used for corolla tube and calyx tube. It often contains the nectaries of the plant. It is present in many plant families, although varies in structural dimensions and appearance. This differentiation between the hypanthium in particular species is useful for identification. Some geometric forms are obconic shapes, as in toyon (Heteromeles), whereas some are saucer-shaped, as in Mitella caulescens.

Its presence is diagnostic of many families, including the Rosaceae, Grossulariaceae, and Fabaceae. In some cases, it can be so deep, with such a narrow top, that the flower can appear to have an inferior ovary – the ovary is below the other attached floral parts. The hypanthium is known by different common names in differing species. In the eucalypts, it is referred to as the gum nut; in roses it is called the hip.

== Variations in plant species ==
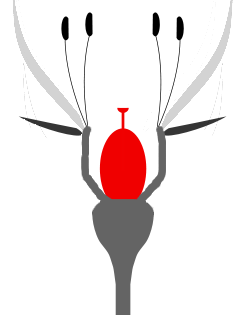
Ovary superior to hypanthium

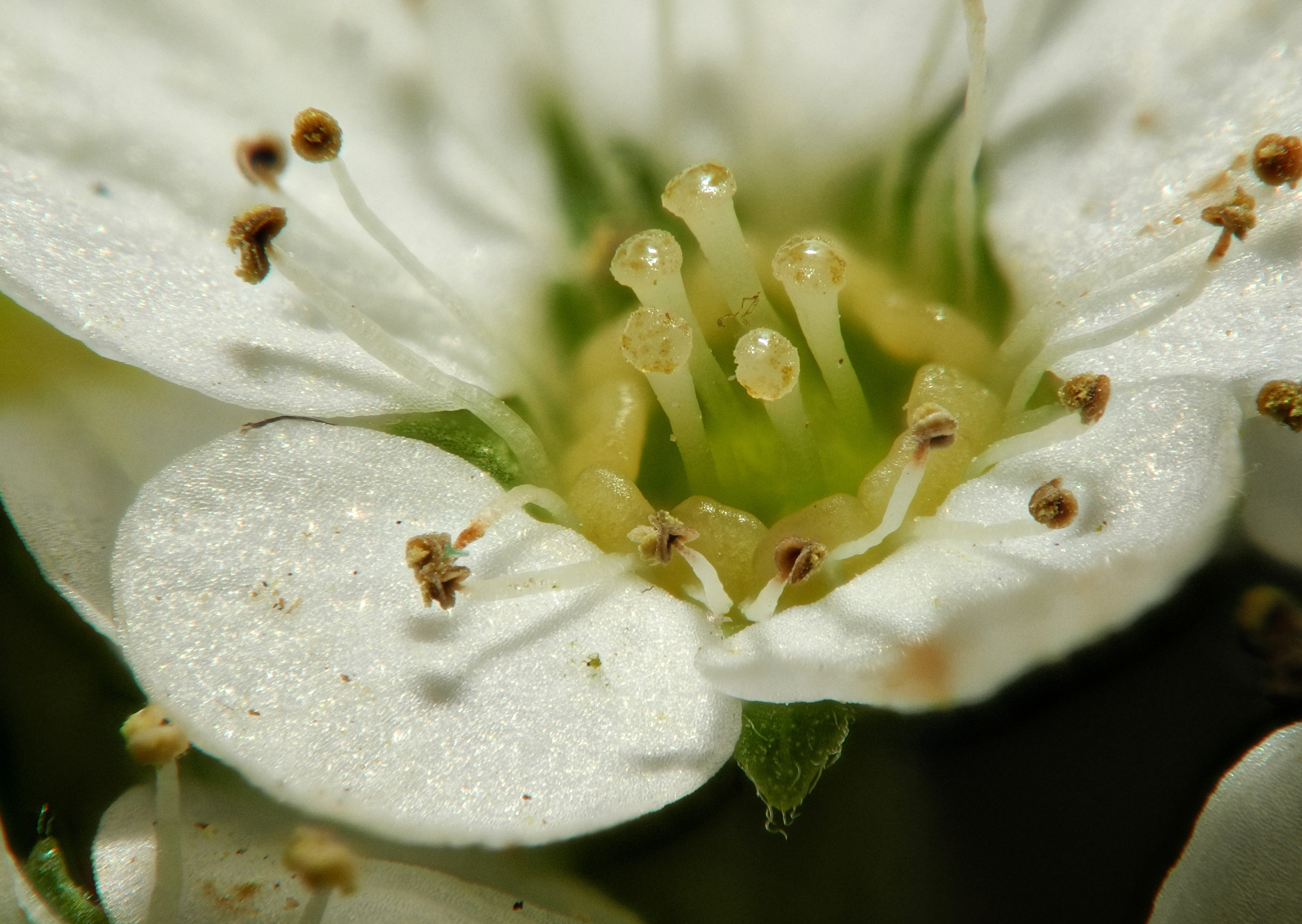
In Spiraea, the hypanthium supports a nectar-producing "disk" which is ring-shaped and may have lobes as it does here. The stamens arise between the petals and the disk.

Hypanthium in Rosa

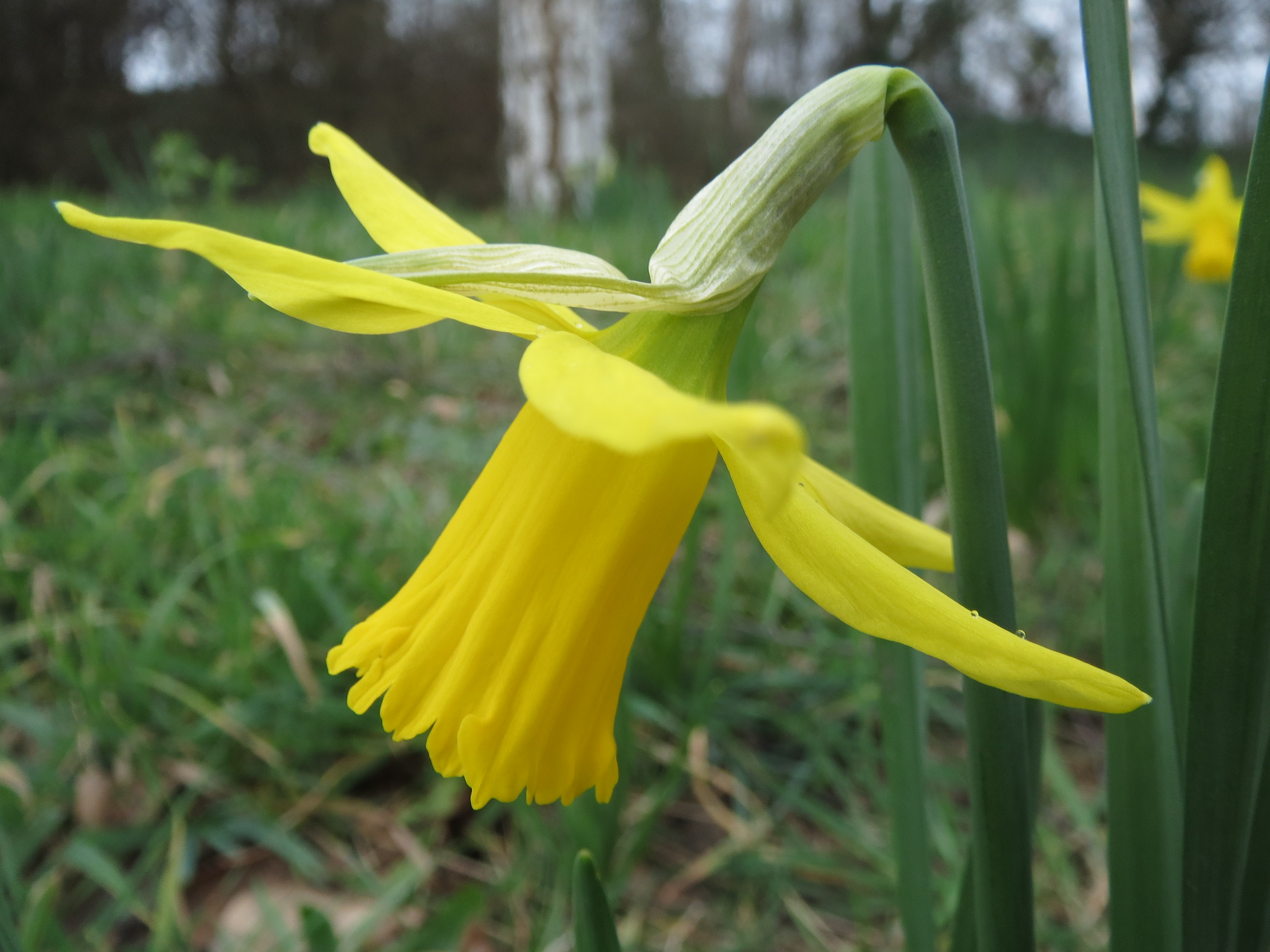
Narcissus pseudonarcissus, showing from the upper bend to the tip of the flower: spathe, ovary, hypanthium, tepals, corona

In myrtles, the hypanthium can either surround the ovary loosely or tightly; in some cases, it can be fused to the walls of the ovary. It can vary in length. The rims around the outside of the hypanthium contain the calyx lobes or free sepals, petals and either the stamen or multiple stamen that are attached at one or two points.

The flowers of the rose family (Rosaceae) always have some type of hypanthium or at least a floral cup from which the sepals, petals and stamens all arise, which is lined with tissue known as nectaries, which produce nectar, a sweet substance that attracts to the flower birds and bees, which receive pollen from the lining of the hypanthium, subsequently transferring it to the next flower they visit, usually a neighbouring plant, facilitating pollination.

When discussing the flowers of the cactus family (Cactaceae), the hypanthium is often also called the pericarpel.

The stamens borne on the hypanthium are the pollen-producing reproductive organs of the flower. The hypanthium helps in many ways with the reproduction pathways of most plants. It provides weather protection and a medium to sustain the lost pollen, increasing the probability of fertility and cross-pollination. The retained pollen can then attach to pollinators such as birds, bees, moths, beetles, bats, butterflies and other animals. Wind can act as an instigator for fertilisation. The hypanthium is also an adaptive feature for structural support. It helps the stem fuse with the flower, in turn strengthening the bond and overall stability and integrity.

== Bibliography ==
=== Books ===
- Cronquist, Arthur (1981), An integrated system of classification of flowering plants, Columbia University Press, ISBN 978-0-231-03880-5
- Givnish, Thomas J (1997), Molecular evolution and adaptive radiation, Cambridge University Press, ISBN 978-0-521-57329-0
- Snow, Neil Wilton (2003), Systematics of Austromyrtus, Lenwebbia, and the Australian species of Gossia (Myrtaceae), American Society of Plant Taxonomists, ISBN 978-0-912861-65-4
- Faegri, Knut; Iversen, Johannes, 1904- (1975), Textbook of pollen analysis (3rd rev. ed.), Hafner Press, archived from the original on 6 December 2014
- Clarke, Andrew (2004). The AgLaw papers. Armidale, N.S.W: Australian Centre for Agriculture and Law. ISBN 9781863898737.

=== Websites ===
Foster, Tony. "Botany Word of the Day". Phytography.
