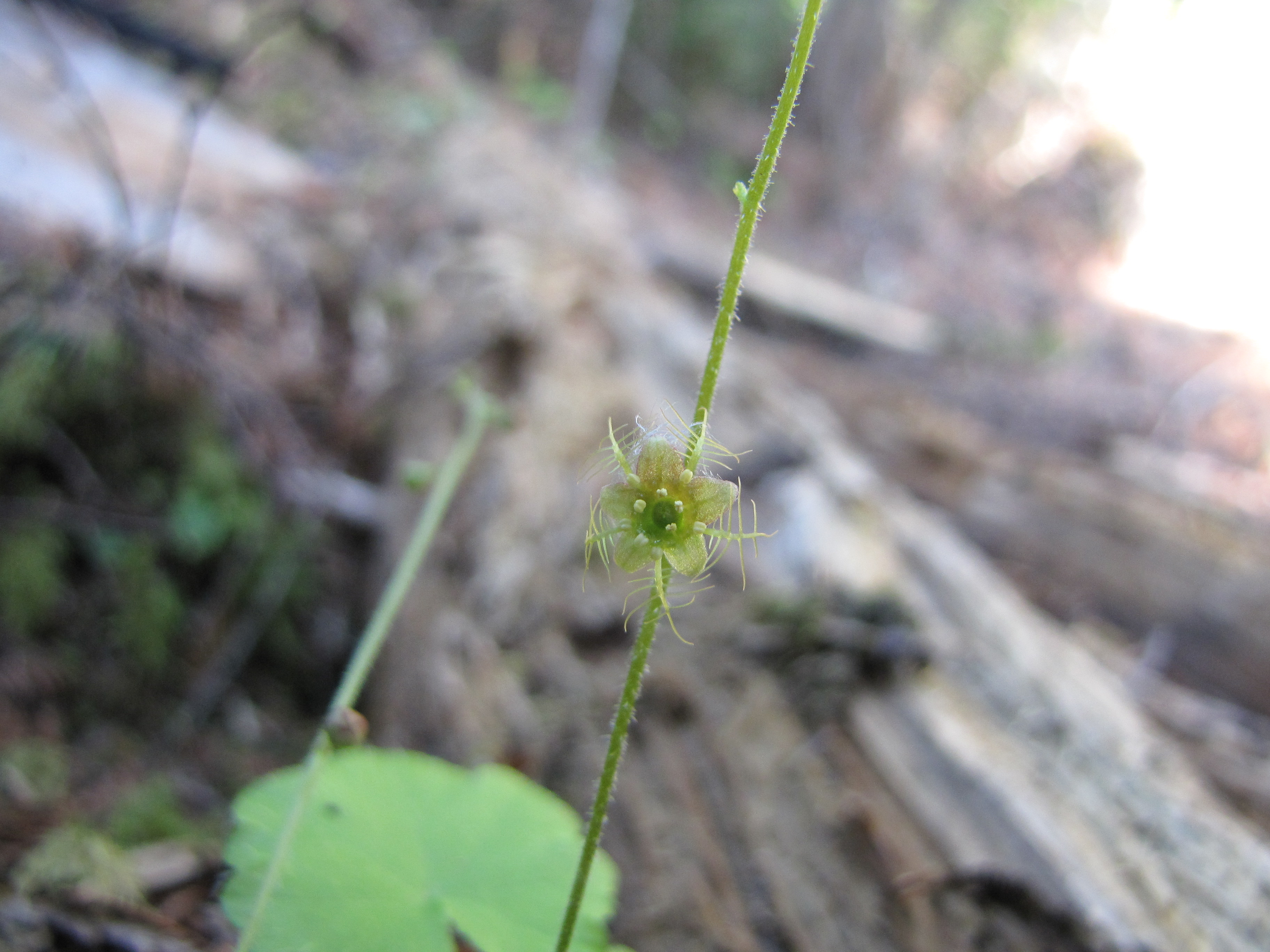
- Flower

Scientific classification
- Kingdom: Plantae
- Clade: Embryophytes
- Clade: Tracheophytes
- Clade: Spermatophytes
- Clade: Angiosperms
- Clade: Eudicots
- Order: Saxifragales
- Family: Saxifragaceae
- Genus: Mitella
- Species: M. nuda

Binomial name
- Mitella nuda L. (1753)

Synonyms
- Mitella cordifolia Lam. (1797); Mitella nuda f. countrymaniae F.Seym. (1969); Mitella nuda f. intermedia Rosend. (1914); Mitella nuda f. prostrata (Michx.) Rosend. (1914); Mitella prostrata Michx. (1803); Mitella reniformis Lam. (1797); Tiarella unifolia Retz. (1783)

= Mitella nuda =

Species of flowering plant

Mitella nuda, the naked bishop's cap or naked miterwort, is a species of flowering plant in the family Saxifragaceae. It is a perennial or rhizomatous geophyte native to temperate and subarctic regions of northern North America and northeastern Asia, ranging across Canada and the northern United States, and from Western Siberia through Mongolia and northern China to Korea, Japan, and the Russian Far East.

It has a single leaf, serrate but not deeply lobed, rising in single stalks from the ground. The leaf color is light green. Tiny white hairs arise perpendicular to the leaf surface. These are especially large and noticeable on the leaf top, but occur on the bottom also. The naked bishop's cap provides low ground cover and grows to be 0.25 to 1.5 inches (6.3 to 38 mm) tall, not counting inflorescence.
