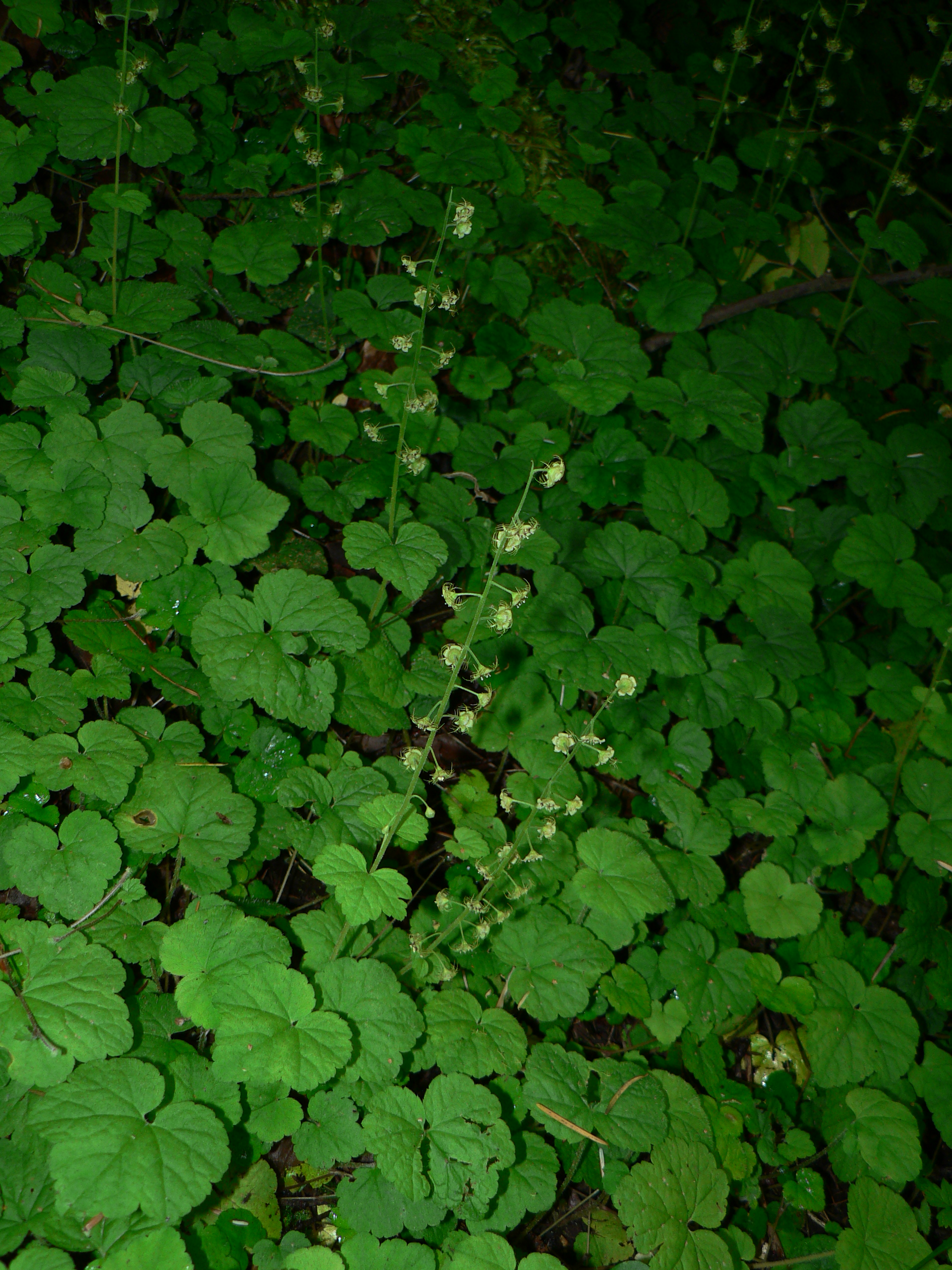
- Mitella caulescens

Scientific classification
- Kingdom: Plantae
- Clade: Embryophytes
- Clade: Tracheophytes
- Clade: Spermatophytes
- Clade: Angiosperms
- Clade: Eudicots
- Order: Saxifragales
- Family: Saxifragaceae
- Genus: Mitella; Tourn. ex L. (1753)

Species
- Mitella diphylla L.; Mitella × inamii Ohwi & Okuyama; Mitella × intermedia Bruhin; Mitella nuda L.

Synonyms
- Mitellopsis Meisn. (1838)

= Mitella =

Genus of flowering plants

Mitella is a genus of flowering plants known as miterworts or bishop's caps. Mitella species are native to temperate and arctic North America and Asia.

== Description ==
Mitella includes perennials growing from a scaly rhizome, bearing wide heart- or spade-shaped leaves near their bases and flowers with five petals in a long raceme or spike.

== Etymology ==
The genus name means "little mitre", from Latin mitra with the diminutive suffix -ella, since the flowers are said to resemble bishop's headdresses. In Classical Latin use, however, mitella means "female headdress" or "sling". Latin mitra comes from Greek mítrā "girdle", "headband", or "turban".

== Species ==
Four species and natural hybrids are accepted.

- Mitella diphylla L. – twoleaf miterwort
- Mitella × inamii Ohwi & Okuyama
- Mitella × intermedia Bruhin (M. diphylla × M. nuda)
- Mitella nuda L. – naked miterwort (syn. Mitella prostrata – creeping bishop's cap)

=== Formerly placed here ===
- Brewerimitella breweri (A.Gray) R.A.Folk & Y.Okuyama – Brewer's miterwort (as Mitella breweri A.Gray)
- Brewerimitella ovalis (Greene) R.A.Folk & Y.Okuyama – coastal miterwort (as Mitella ovalis Greene)
- Mitellastra caulescens (Nutt.) Howell – slightstemmed miterwort (as Mitella caulescens Nutt.)
- Ozomelis diversifolia (Greene) Rydb. – angleleaf miterwort (as Mitella diversifolia)
- Ozomelis stauropetala (Piper) Rydb. – smallflower miterwort (as Mitella stauropetala)
- Ozomelis trifida (Graham) Rydb. – threepart miterwort (as Mitella trifida Graham)
- Pectiantia pentandra (Hook.) Rydb. – fivestamen miterwort (as Mitella pentandra Hook.)
