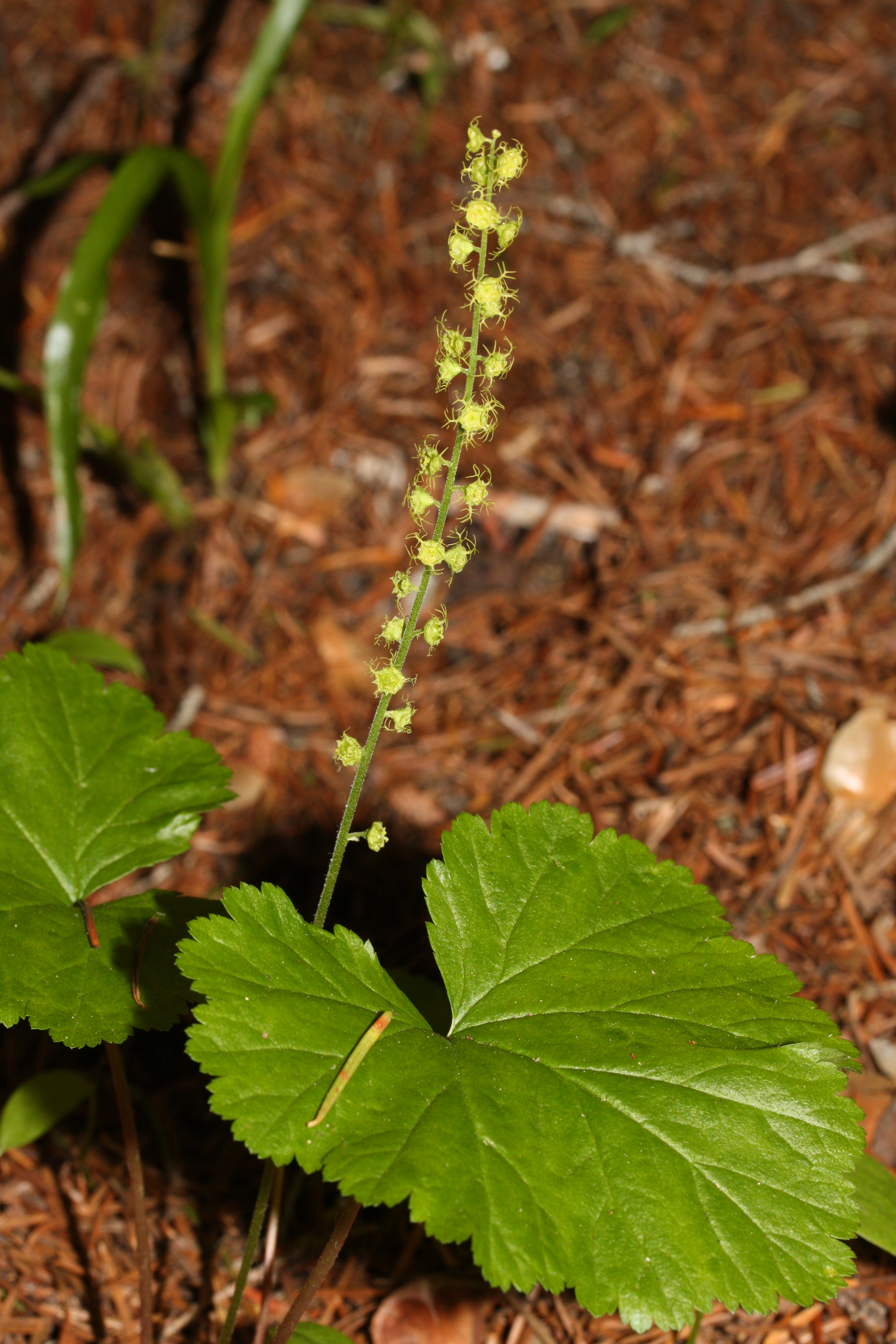
- Brewerimitella breweri in Mount Rainier National Park

Conservation status
- Secure (NatureServe)

Scientific classification
- Kingdom: Plantae
- Clade: Tracheophytes
- Clade: Angiosperms
- Clade: Eudicots
- Order: Saxifragales
- Family: Saxifragaceae
- Genus: Brewerimitella
- Species: B. breweri

Binomial name
- Brewerimitella breweri (A.Gray) R.A.Folk & Y.Okuyama (2021)

Synonyms
- Mitella breweri A.Gray (1865); Mitella breweri f. denticulata Rosend. (1914); Mitella breweri f. lobata Rosend. (1914); Pectiantia breweri (A.Gray) Rydb. (1905)

= Brewerimitella breweri =

Species of flowering plant

Brewerimitella breweri is a species of flowering plant in the saxifrage family, known by the synonyms Mitella breweri and Pectiantia breweri and by the common names Brewer's mitrewort and Brewer's bishop's cap. It is native to western North America from British Columbia to central California (Sierra Nevada range) and Nevada, where it grows in moist meadows, woods, and mountain forests.

It is a rhizomatous perennial herb growing up to about 30 or 40 centimetres (12 or 16 in) tall. Most of the leaves occur around the base of the stem. They have rounded blades several centimetres wide and edges divided into dull toothed lobes. The erect inflorescence bears several flowers, sometimes over 50, usually along one side of the stem. The distinctive flower is saucer-shaped with five greenish petals which are divided into narrow, whiskerlike lobes.
