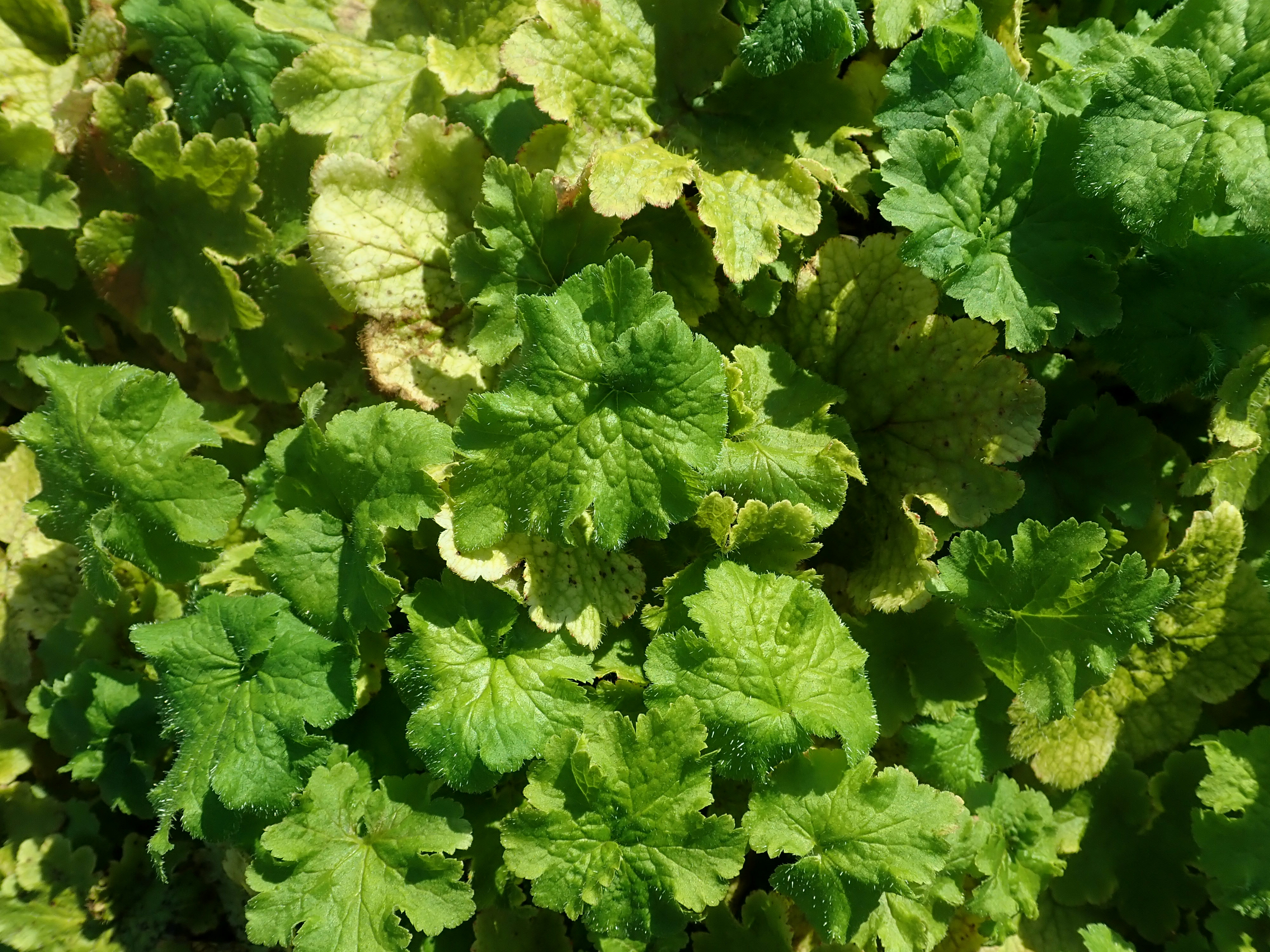

Conservation status
- Secure (NatureServe)

Scientific classification
- Kingdom: Plantae
- Clade: Tracheophytes
- Clade: Angiosperms
- Clade: Eudicots
- Order: Saxifragales
- Family: Saxifragaceae
- Genus: Brewerimitella
- Species: B. ovalis

Binomial name
- Brewerimitella ovalis (Greene) R.A.Folk & Y.Okuyama (2021)

Synonyms
- Mitella hallii Howell (1895); Mitella ovalis Greene (1887); Pectiantia ovalis (Greene) Rydb. (1905)

= Brewerimitella ovalis =

Species of flowering plant

Brewerimitella ovalis is a species of flowering plant in the saxifrage family known by the common names coastal miterwort and oval-leaf miterwort. It is native to western North America from southwestern British Columbia, including Vancouver Island, to northern California as far south as Marin County. It grows in moist, shady habitat, such as coastal forests and streambanks.

== Description ==
It is a rhizomatous perennial herb growing up to about 35 or 40 centimetres (14 or 16 in) tall. The leaves occur around the base of the stem. They have oval blades up to 5 centimetres (2.0 in) wide with toothed, lobed edges. The erect inflorescence bears several flowers, generally 20 to 60, usually along one side of the stem. The distinctive flower is saucer-shaped with five greenish yellow petals which are divided into narrow, whisker-like lobes. The petiole is between 1.2 and 8 centimetres (0.47 and 3.15 in) long. There are no cauline leaves. The 1 to 3 inflorescences with between 20 and 60 flowers per node. The pedicles are between 1 and 2 millimetres long. The seeds are either reddish-brown or blackish in color. The fruit type is a capsule. The bloom color is either yellow or green. The bloom period is between the months of April, May, and June.
