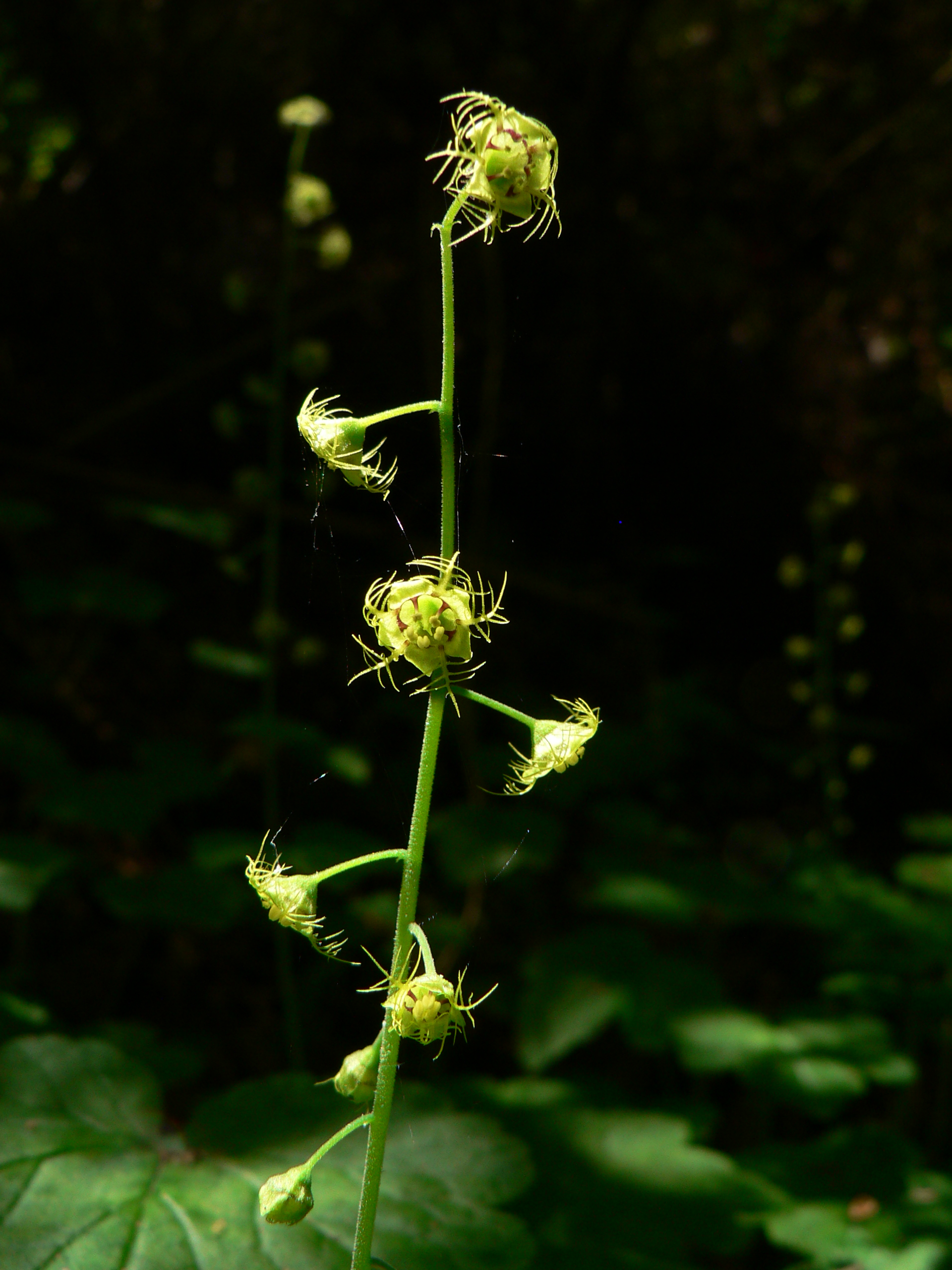

Scientific classification
- Kingdom: Plantae
- Clade: Tracheophytes
- Clade: Angiosperms
- Clade: Eudicots
- Order: Saxifragales
- Family: Saxifragaceae
- Genus: Mitellastra (Nutt. ex Torr. & A.Gray) Howell (1898)
- Species: M. caulescens

Binomial name
- Mitellastra caulescens (Nutt.) Howell (1898)

Synonyms
- Mitella caulescens Nutt. (1840); Mitella caulescens f. tonsa H.St.John (1937)

= Mitellastra =

Species of flowering plant

Mitellastra caulescens, the slightstemmed miterwort, star-shaped mitrewort, leafy miterwort, or creeping miterwort, is an herbaceous perennial flowering plant in the family Saxifragaceae. It is the sole species in genus Mitellastra. It is native to western North America, where it grows in British Columbia, California, Idaho, Montana, Oregon, and Washington. In California it is limited to the northwestern part of the state, growing along the North Coast and in the Klamath Mountains and outer and high Northern Coast Ranges.

It grows in wet shady places.
