= Fernleaf =

Fernleaf may refer to:

- Anchor (brand), an alternative brand for Anchor dairy products
- Fernleaf, Kentucky, an unincorporated community in the United States
- Pedicularis bracteosa, a North American plant species in the lousewort genus
