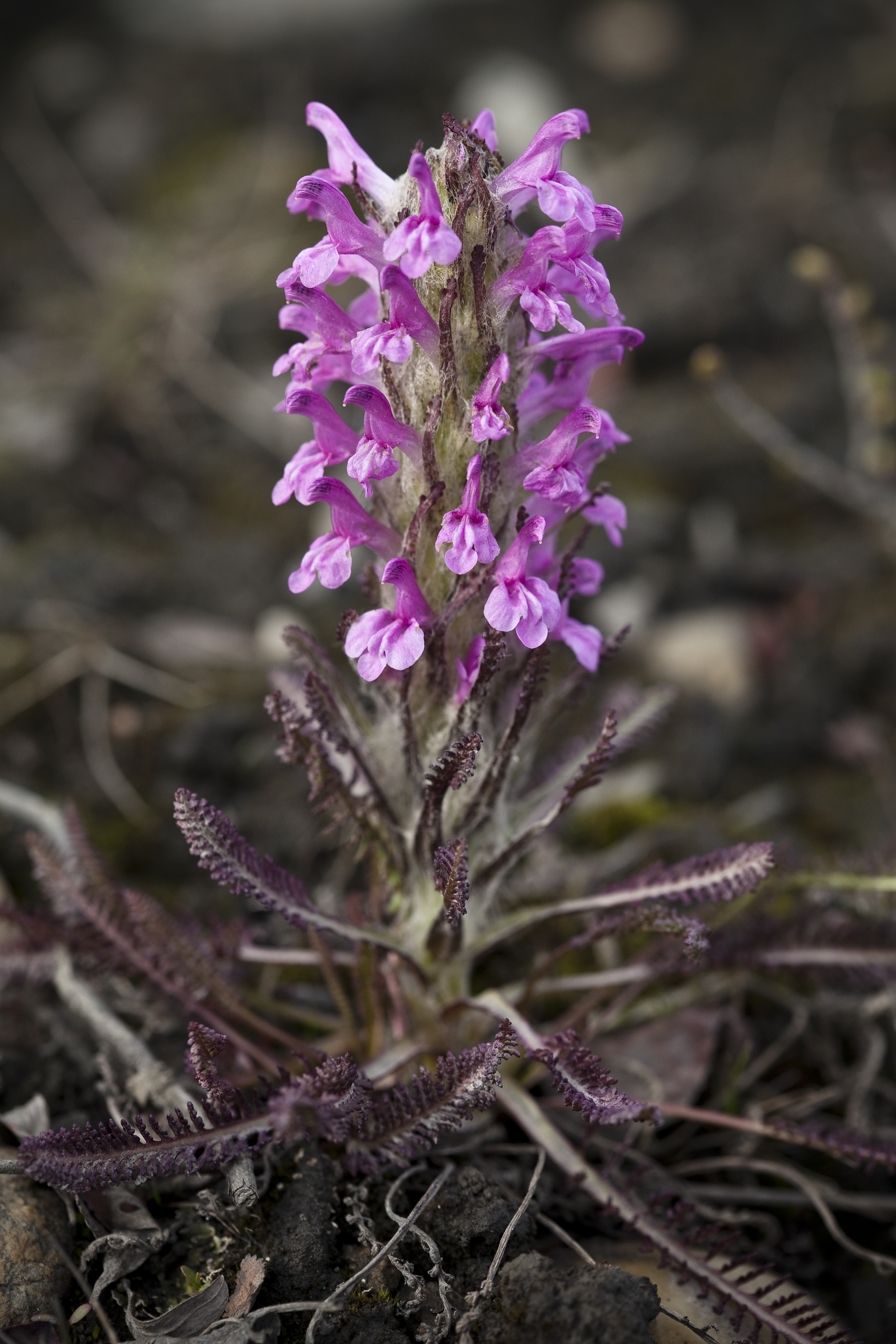

Scientific classification
- Kingdom: Plantae
- Clade: Tracheophytes
- Clade: Angiosperms
- Clade: Eudicots
- Clade: Asterids
- Order: Lamiales
- Family: Orobanchaceae
- Genus: Pedicularis
- Species: P. lanata

Binomial name
- Pedicularis lanata Cham. and Schlect.

Synonyms
- Pedicularis kanei Dur.

= Pedicularis lanata =

Species of flowering plant

Pedicularis lanata is a species of flowering plant in the family Orobanchaceae. It is native to Canada and Alaska. Its common names include woolly lousewort and bumble-bee flower.

== Description ==
The plant has a wooly stem 5–25 centimetres (2.0–9.8 in) tall which grows from a bright yellow taproot. The narrow leaves are lobed or compound, the lower on long petioles. The woolly, many-flowered inflorescence is dense when new, elongating with maturity. The corolla is up to 2 centimeters long and is usually dark pink, but sometimes white. It is surrounded by toothed sepals. The fruit is a flat, beaked capsule 8–13 millimetres (0.31–0.51 in) long. The seeds have a honeycomb-patterned surface. P. lanata is dependent on insects in order to set seeds.

P. lanata has a breeding system with high capacity for outcrossing in West Greenland (Disko) and also show great morphological variation, compared to P. flammea, P. hirsuta and P. lapponica.

== Distribution ==
P. lanata is native to Canada and Alaska, and is also found in Russia , Greenland and Svalbard.
