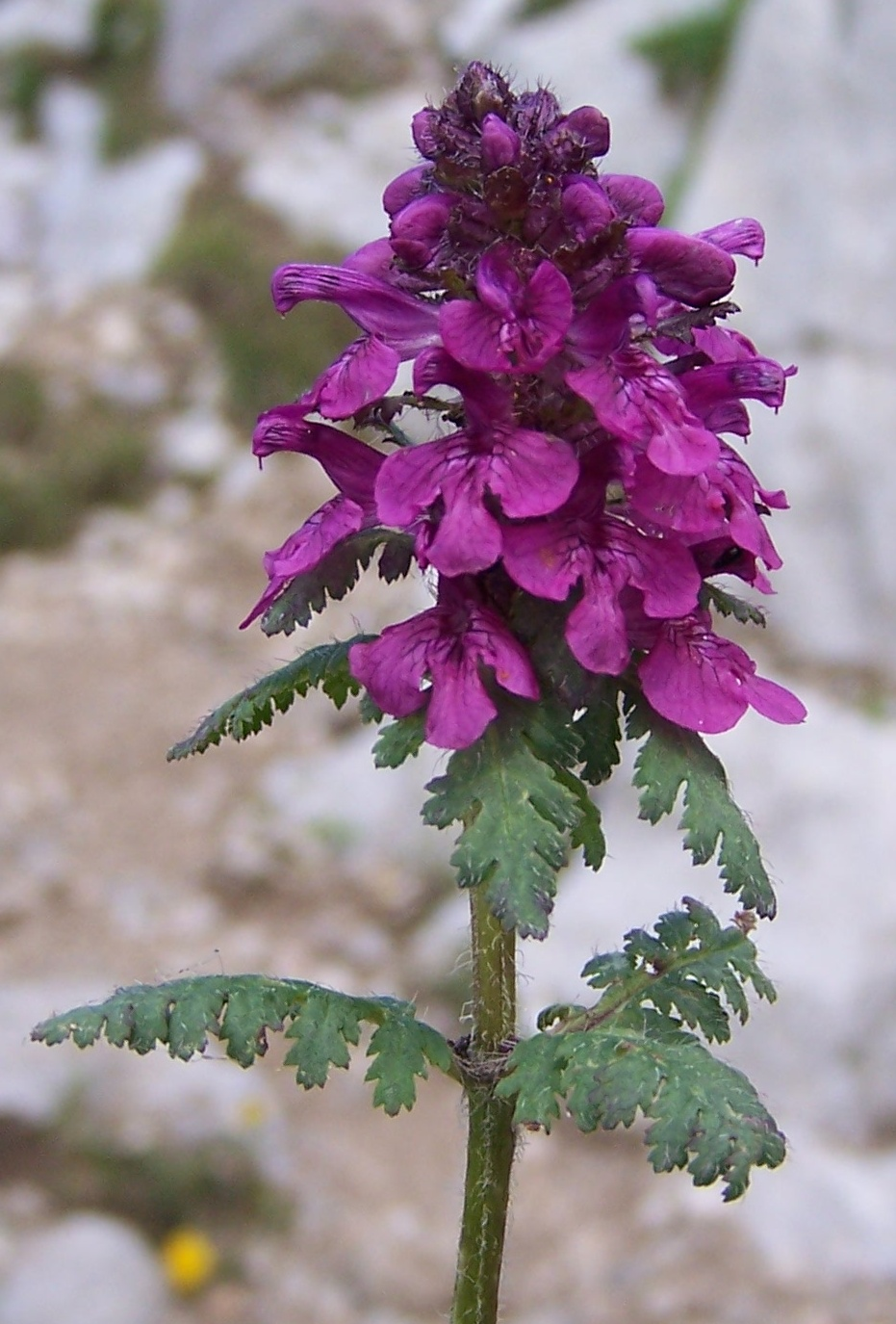

Scientific classification
- Kingdom: Plantae
- Clade: Tracheophytes
- Clade: Angiosperms
- Clade: Eudicots
- Clade: Asterids
- Order: Lamiales
- Family: Orobanchaceae
- Genus: Pedicularis
- Species: P. verticillata

Binomial name
- Pedicularis verticillata L.

= Pedicularis verticillata =

Species of flowering plant

Pedicularis verticillata, the whorled lousewort, is a species of flowering plant in the family Orobanchaceae which can be found in Alaska, North-Western Canada, and everywhere in China at the elevation of 2,100–4,400 metres (6,900–14,400 ft). Its native habitats include moist meadows and lakeshores.

== Description ==
The plant is a perennial herb and is 15–35 centimetres (5.9–13.8 in) high. The stems are erect at the center and have hairs which come in four lines. It leaves carry 3 centimetres (1.2 in) long petioles which are white coloured while its leaf-blades are oblong, lanceolate and are 2.5–3 centimetres (0.98–1.18 in) by 1–1.2 centimetres (0.39–0.47 in) (sometimes they are as wide as 1.8 centimetres (0.71 in)). Both stem and basal leaves are of the same length while the species' calyx is red and is 6 millimetres (0.24 in) long and is ovoid. Raceme is inflorescent and dense, with white coloured flowers. It corolla is of purple colour and is 1.3 centimetres (0.51 in) with right tube being bent. The galea is falcate, 5 millimetres (0.20 in) long and rounded at the front. The plant' capsule is 1–1.5 centimetres (0.39–0.59 in) by 4–5 millimetres (0.16–0.20 in), and is both apiculate and lanceolate with the seeds being 1.8 millimetres (0.071 in) long.

== See also ==
- Pedicularis lanata
- Pedicularis sudetica
