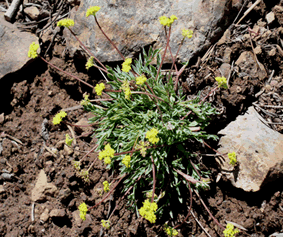

Conservation status
- Critically Imperiled (NatureServe)

Scientific classification
- Kingdom: Plantae
- Clade: Tracheophytes
- Clade: Angiosperms
- Clade: Eudicots
- Clade: Asterids
- Order: Apiales
- Family: Apiaceae
- Genus: Lomatium
- Species: L. greenmanii

Binomial name
- Lomatium greenmanii Mathias

= Lomatium greenmanii =

Species of flowering plant

Lomatium greenmanii is a rare species of flowering plant in the carrot family known by the common names Greenman's desertparsley and Greenman's biscuitroot. It is endemic to Oregon in the United States, where it is found only in the Wallowa Mountains of Wallowa County.

This is a petite perennial herb with highly dissected green basal leaves each 3 to 6 centimeters long. The inflorescence is borne on a stem just a few centimeters tall. It is an umbel of tiny yellow flowers. Blooming occurs in July and August after the snow melts in its high elevation habitat.

The plant grows in the subalpine zone in rocky areas or meadows amongst conifers. Other plants in the habitat may include short-leaved fescue (Festuca brachypylla), narrow false oat (Trisetum spicatum), Cusick's desertparsley (Lomatium cusickii), dwarf mountain fleabane (Erigeron compositus), white coil-beak lousewort (Pedicularis contorta), and Mt. Hood pussypaws (Cistanthe umbellata).

This plant grows on three mountain peaks in one mountain range in northeastern Oregon. Threats include trampling by hikers and tourists visiting Mount Howard. Trampling causes the rocky substrate to become unstable and may crush seedlings.
