= Pedicularis elephantiflora =

Conservation status
- Least Concern (IUCN 3.1)

Scientific classification
- Kingdom: Plantae
- Clade: Tracheophytes
- Clade: Angiosperms
- Clade: Eudicots
- Clade: Asterids
- Order: Lamiales
- Family: Orobanchaceae
- Genus: Pedicularis
- Species: P. elephantiflora

Binomial name
- Pedicularis elephantiflora T.Yamaz.

Species of flowering plant

Pedicularis elephantiflora is a species of flowering plant endemic to Bhutan.
