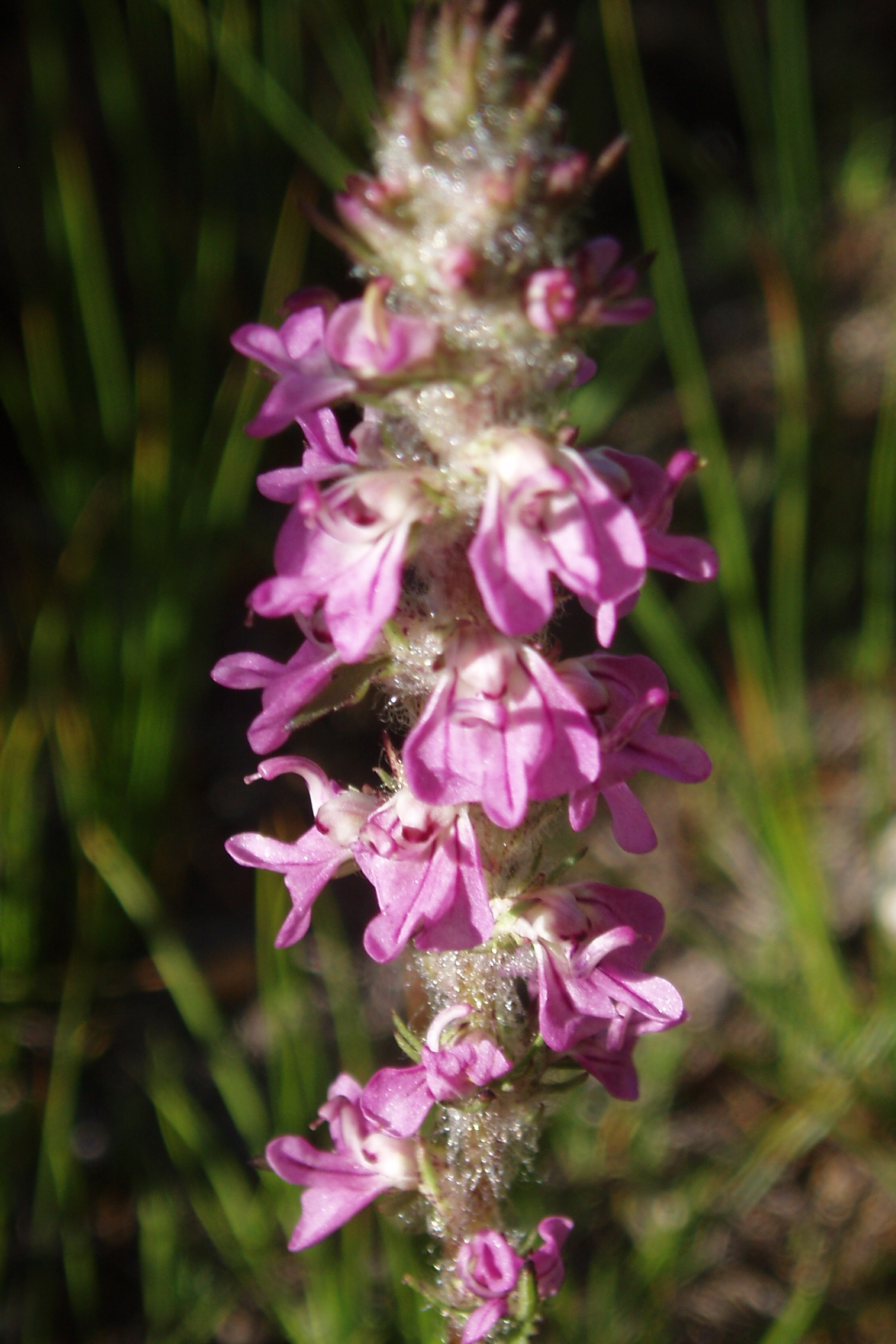

Scientific classification
- Kingdom: Plantae
- Clade: Tracheophytes
- Clade: Angiosperms
- Clade: Eudicots
- Clade: Asterids
- Order: Lamiales
- Family: Orobanchaceae
- Genus: Pedicularis
- Species: P. attollens

Binomial name
- Pedicularis attollens A.Gray

= Pedicularis attollens =

Species of flowering plant

Pedicularis attollens is a species of flowering plant in the family Orobanchaceae known by the common name little elephant's head lousewort. It is native to Oregon and California, where it grows in moist mountainous areas such as meadows and bogs. It is a perennial herb growing up to 60 centimetres (24 in) in maximum height with one or more stems emerging from a caudex. The leaves are comblike, divided into many linear lobes. The inflorescence is a raceme occupying the top of the stem. The sepals of the flowers and the bracts between them are woolly. The flower is under 1 centimetre (2/5 in) long and divided into a curving trunklike upper lip and a three-lobed lower lip. It is pink or purplish in color with darker stripes. The fruit is a capsule up to 1 centimetre (2/5 in) long containing seeds with netlike surfaces.
