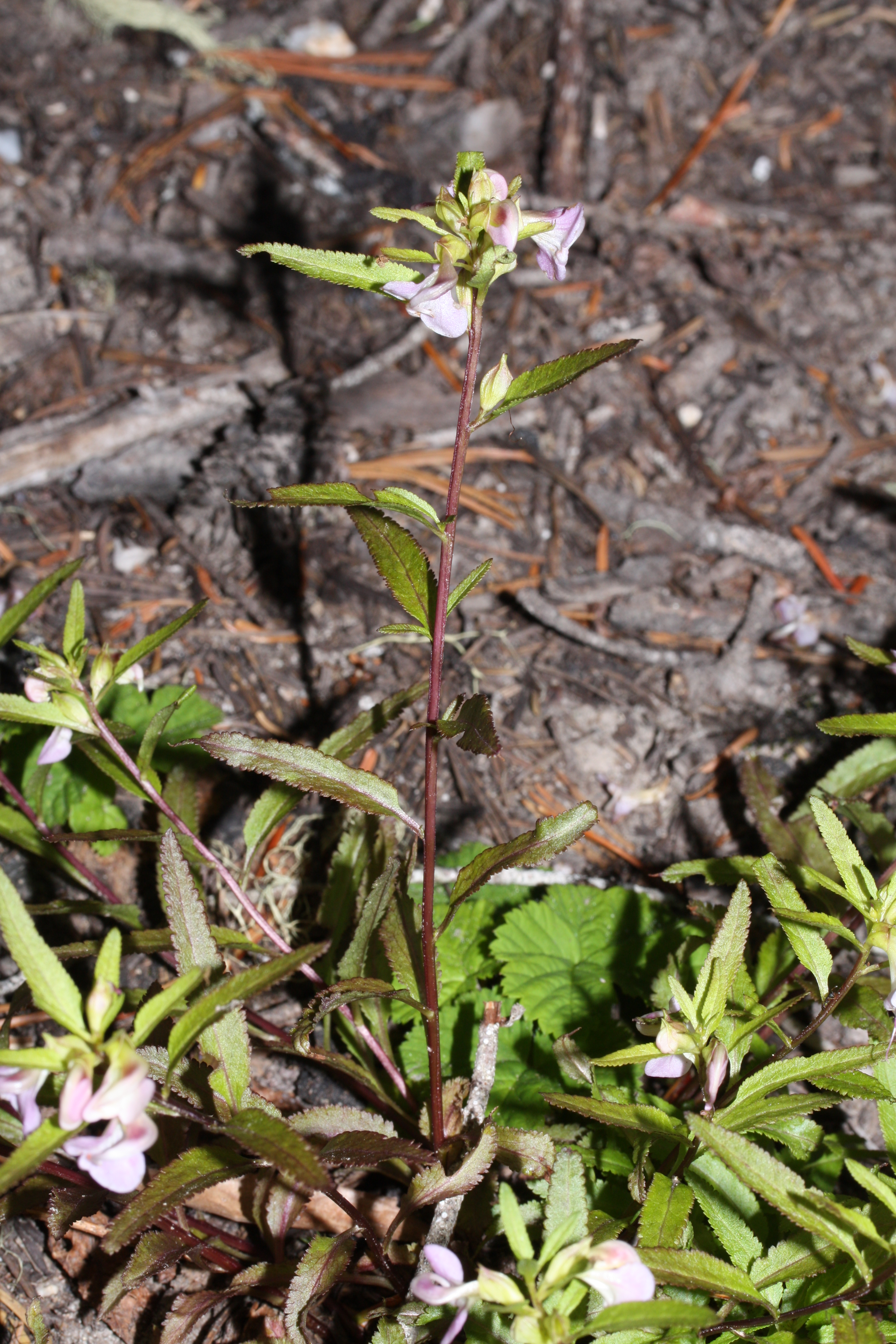
- In Mount Rainier National Park

Conservation status
- Secure (NatureServe)

Scientific classification
- Kingdom: Plantae
- Clade: Tracheophytes
- Clade: Angiosperms
- Clade: Eudicots
- Clade: Asterids
- Order: Lamiales
- Family: Orobanchaceae
- Genus: Pedicularis
- Species: P. racemosa

Binomial name
- Pedicularis racemosa Douglas ex Benth.

Subspecies
- P. r. subsp. alba; P. r. subsp. racemosa

= Pedicularis racemosa =

Plant species in the broomrape family

Pedicularis racemosa is a species of flowering plant in the family Orobanchaceae known by the common names sickletop lousewort and leafy lousewort. It is native to western North America, where it grows in coniferous forests. This is a perennial herb producing several stems up to 80 centimetres (31 in) tall, greenish to dark red in color. The leaves are up to 10 centimetres (4 in) long, linear in shape and lined with teeth. The inflorescence is a small raceme of flowers occupying the top of the stem. Each white to light purple or yellow flower is up to 1.6 centimetres (2/3 in) long and is divided into a curved or coiled beak-like upper lip and a wide three-lobed lower lip. The fruit is a capsule over a centimeter in length containing smooth seeds.

== Taxonomy ==
Pedicularis racemosa was scientifically described and named in 1838 by George Bentham based on an incomplete description by David Douglas. It is classified in the genus Pedicularis within the family Orobanchaceae and has two accepted subspecies.

- Pedicularis racemosa subsp. alba – Widespread, from Pacific Coast to Rocky Mountains
- Pedicularis racemosa subsp. racemosa – British Columbia to California
