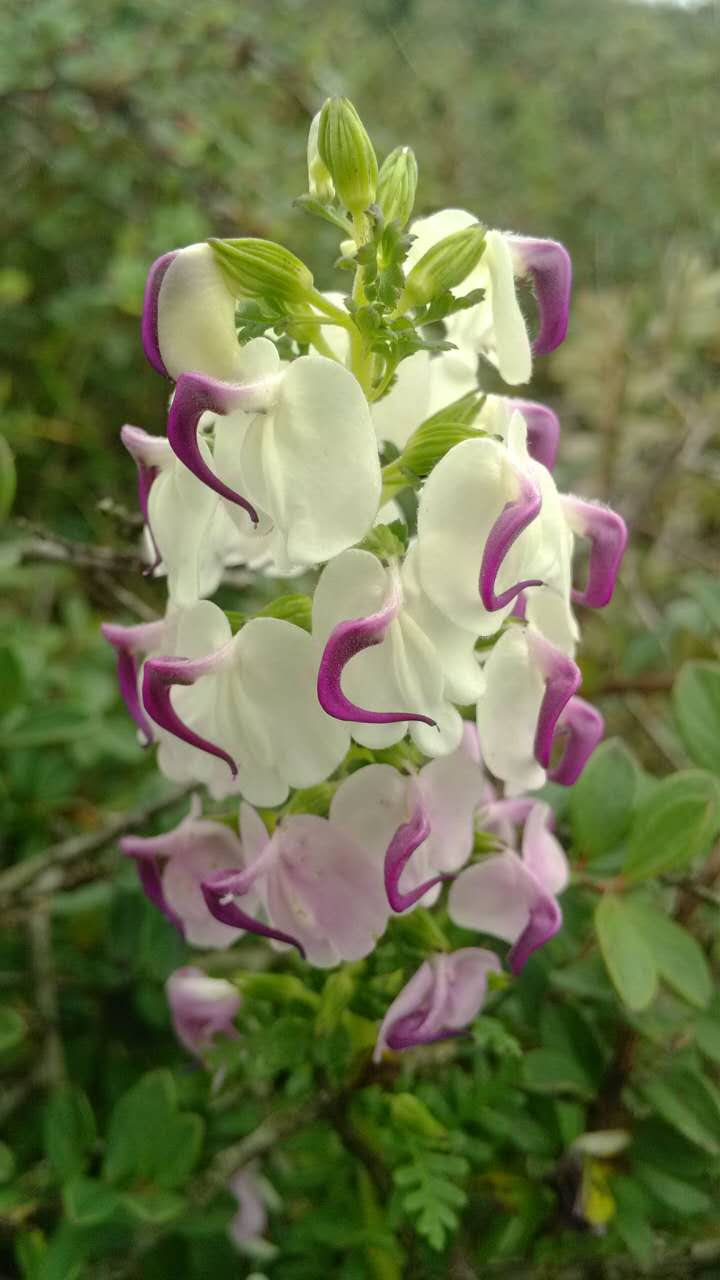

Scientific classification
- Kingdom: Plantae
- Clade: Tracheophytes
- Clade: Angiosperms
- Clade: Eudicots
- Clade: Asterids
- Order: Lamiales
- Family: Orobanchaceae
- Genus: Pedicularis
- Species: P. oxycarpa

Binomial name
- Pedicularis oxycarpa Franch. ex Maxim.

= Pedicularis oxycarpa =

Species of flowering plant

Pedicularis oxycarpa is a species of flowering plant in the family Orobanchaceae. It is native to Yunnan and Sichuan, southwest China, where it grows in 2800–4400 m alpine meadows.20–40 cm tall. Corolla white, with purplish beak, 1.4-1.8 cm.
