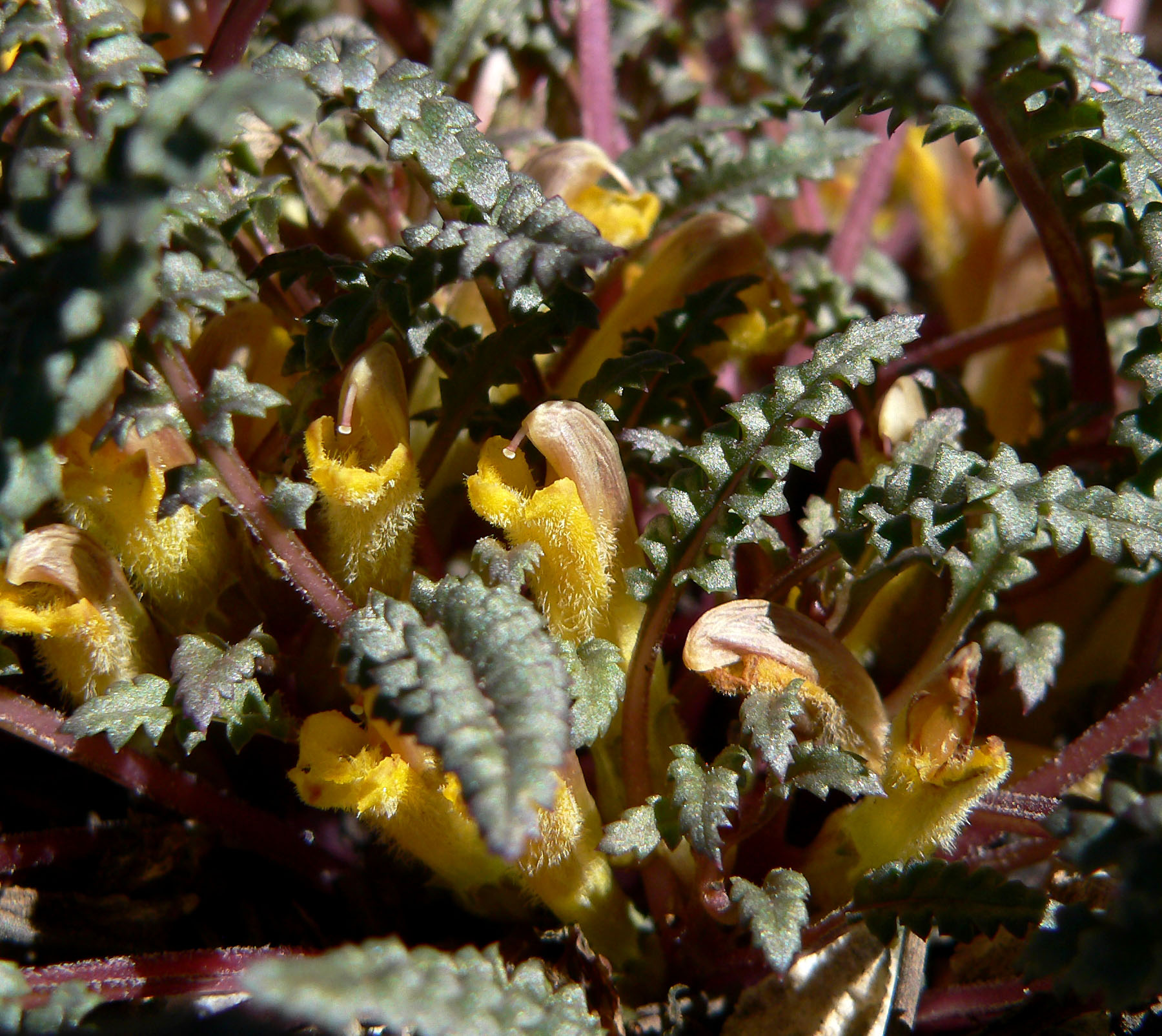
- ssp. charlestonensis

Scientific classification
- Kingdom: Plantae
- Clade: Tracheophytes
- Clade: Angiosperms
- Clade: Eudicots
- Clade: Asterids
- Order: Lamiales
- Family: Orobanchaceae
- Genus: Pedicularis
- Species: P. semibarbata

Binomial name
- Pedicularis semibarbata A.Gray

= Pedicularis semibarbata =

Species of flowering plant

Pedicularis semibarbata, known by the common name pinewoods lousewort, is a species of flowering plant in the family Orobanchaceae.

It is native to California and Nevada. It can often be found in coniferous forests of the Peninsular Ranges, Sierra Nevada, and Transverse Ranges.

== Description ==
Pedicularis semibarbata is a perennial herb producing several stems up to 20 centimeters long from a caudex, but most of the stem is beneath the soil and the plant is low on the ground. The leaves are up to 20 centimeters long, lance-shaped shape and divided into many toothed or lobed segments.

The inflorescence is a raceme of flowers with hairy bracts and sepals surrounding the flower bases. Each hairy red- or purple-tinged yellow flower is club-shaped and may exceed 2 centimeters in length. Toward the middle it is divided into a broad hooded upper lip and a three-lobed lower lip.

Parasitic plant

Like many species in the broomrape family, the lousewort is a root-parasite. This species taps nutrients from conifers and the lupine Lupinus fulcratus.

Some authors recognize the Pedicularis semibarbata subtaxon charlestonensis, which is endemic to Nevada.
