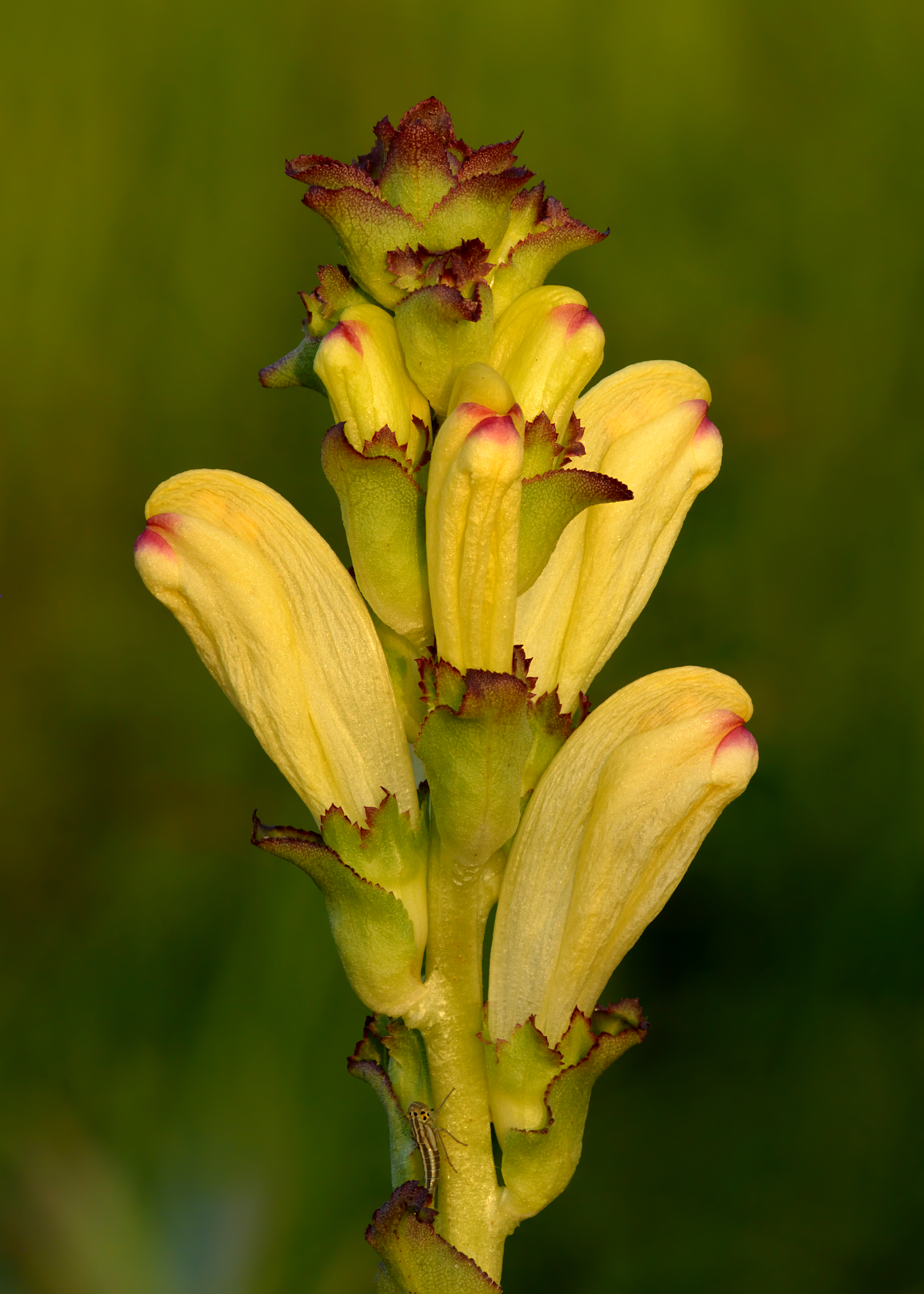

Scientific classification
- Kingdom: Plantae
- Clade: Tracheophytes
- Clade: Angiosperms
- Clade: Eudicots
- Clade: Asterids
- Order: Lamiales
- Family: Orobanchaceae
- Genus: Pedicularis
- Species: P. sceptrum-carolinum

Binomial name
- Pedicularis sceptrum-carolinum L.

= Pedicularis sceptrum-carolinum =

Species of flowering plant

Pedicularis sceptrum-carolinum, commonly known as moor-king or moor-king lousewort, is a plant species in the genus Pedicularis.
