= Pedicularis procera =

Conservation status
- Apparently Secure (NatureServe)

Scientific classification
- Kingdom: Plantae
- Clade: Embryophytes
- Clade: Tracheophytes
- Clade: Angiosperms
- Clade: Eudicots
- Clade: Asterids
- Order: Lamiales
- Family: Orobanchaceae
- Genus: Pedicularis
- Species: P. procera

Binomial name
- Pedicularis procera A.Gray

Species of flowering plant

Pedicularis procera, the giant lousewort, is a species of flowering plant native to the western United States.

== Description ==
Pedicularis procera is a large species of lousewort, with a stem that can exceed 1m in length. The leaves of the plant resemble a fern, but is distinguished by the reproductive spike. The flowers are pinkish with red streaks and can number in the hundreds. Flowers bloom between July and August.

== Distribution and habitat ==
Pedicularis procera is found in Arizona, New Mexico, Colorado, Utah, Wyoming, and South Dakota. The giant lousewort is found in higher elevation regions between 7,000 ft and 10,000 ft. It lives in areas with rich soils and is frequently found in near streams. It is associated with aspen, meadow, and spruce-fir communities.
