= Pedicularis dhurensis =

Conservation status
- Near Threatened (IUCN 3.1)

Scientific classification
- Kingdom: Plantae
- Clade: Tracheophytes
- Clade: Angiosperms
- Clade: Eudicots
- Clade: Asterids
- Order: Lamiales
- Family: Orobanchaceae
- Genus: Pedicularis
- Species: P. dhurensis

Binomial name
- Pedicularis dhurensis R.R.Mill

Species of flowering plant

Pedicularis dhurensis is a species of flowering plant endemic to Bhutan.
