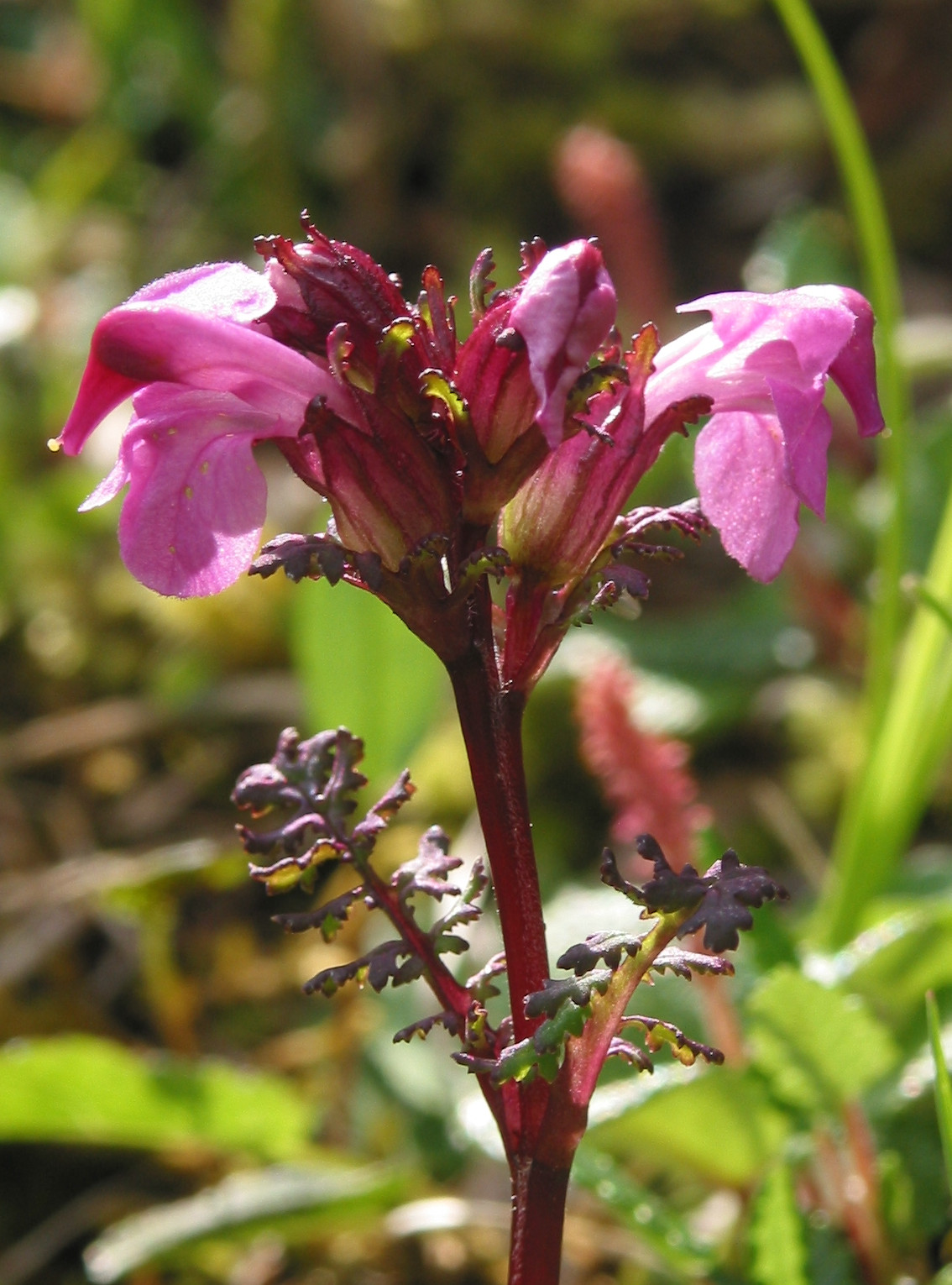

Scientific classification
- Kingdom: Plantae
- Clade: Tracheophytes
- Clade: Angiosperms
- Clade: Eudicots
- Clade: Asterids
- Order: Lamiales
- Family: Orobanchaceae
- Genus: Pedicularis
- Species: P. rostratocapitata

Binomial name
- Pedicularis rostratocapitata Crantz, 1769

= Pedicularis rostratocapitata =

Species of flowering plant

Pedicularis rostratocapitata is a species of flowering plant in the family Orobanchaceae commonly known as long-nosed lousewort. It is endemic to the Alps.
