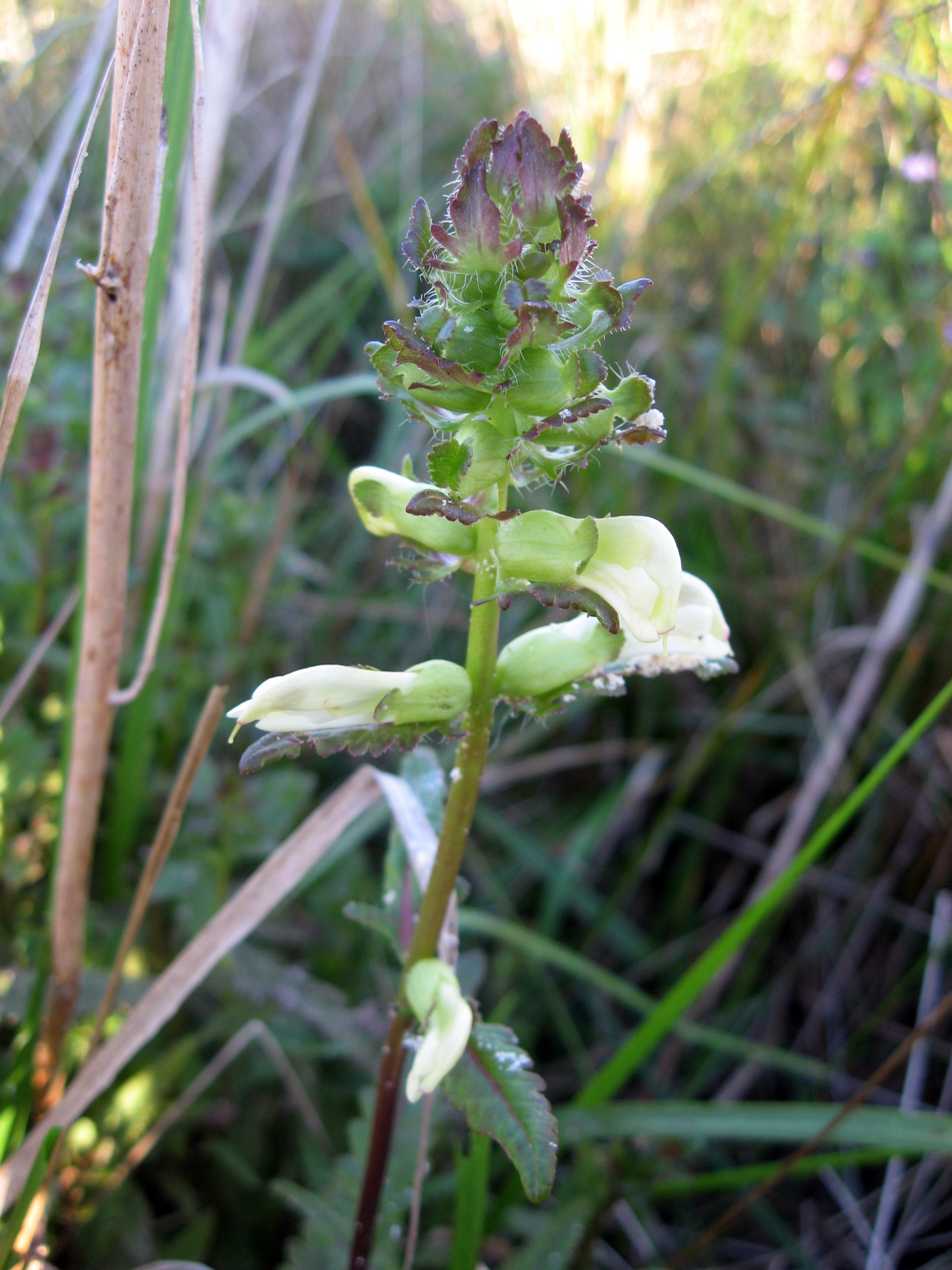

Scientific classification
- Kingdom: Plantae
- Clade: Tracheophytes
- Clade: Angiosperms
- Clade: Eudicots
- Clade: Asterids
- Order: Lamiales
- Family: Orobanchaceae
- Genus: Pedicularis
- Species: P. lanceolata

Binomial name
- Pedicularis lanceolata Michx.

= Pedicularis lanceolata =

Species of flowering plant

Pedicularis lanceolata, the swamp lousewort, is a species of flowering plant native to the Midwestern and Northeastern United States and southern Canada. It is most often found in base-rich wetlands such as fens, springs, and wet meadows.

It produces a spiral of cream-colored flowers in late summer through fall.
