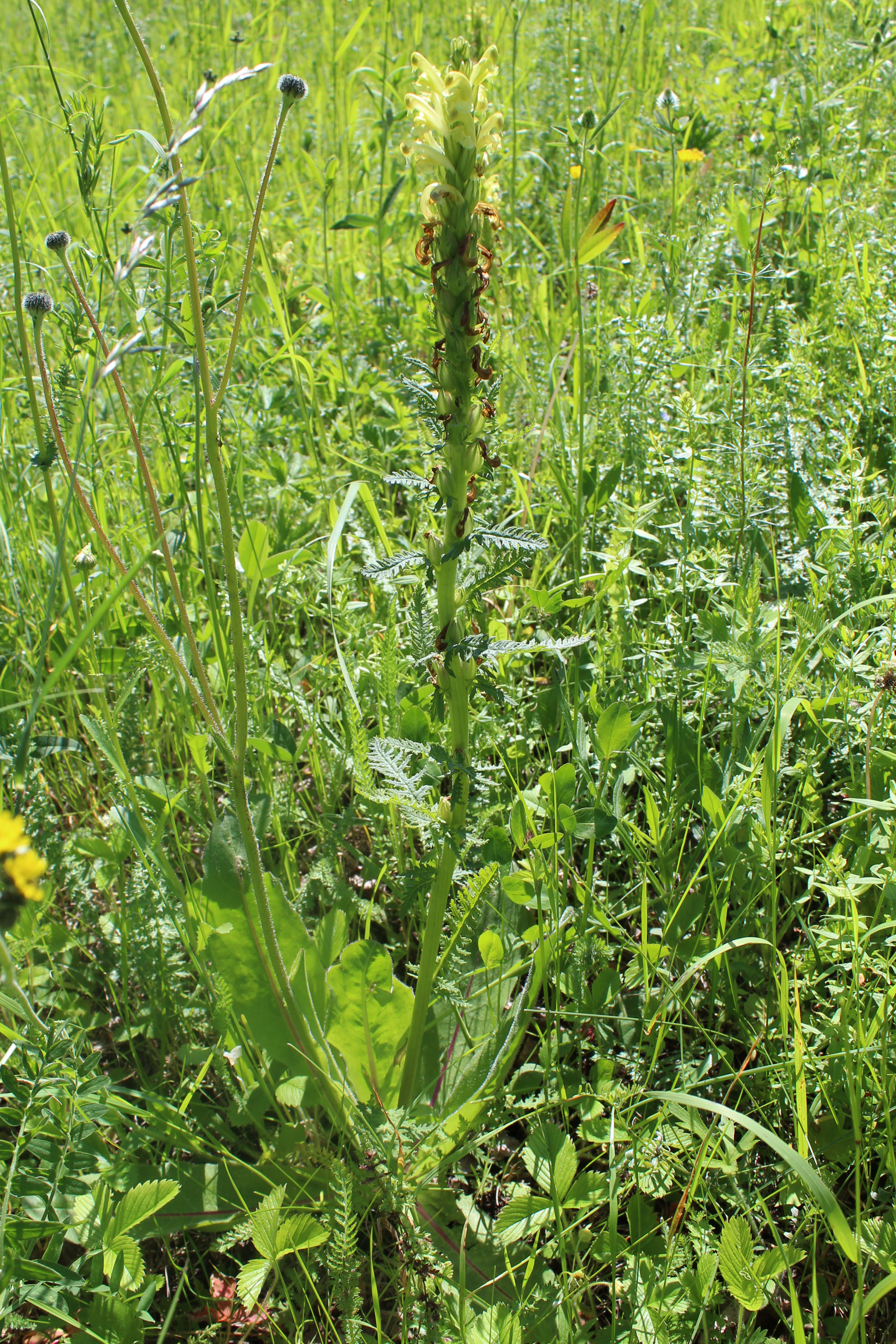

Scientific classification
- Kingdom: Plantae
- Clade: Tracheophytes
- Clade: Angiosperms
- Clade: Eudicots
- Clade: Asterids
- Order: Lamiales
- Family: Orobanchaceae
- Genus: Pedicularis
- Species: P. kaufmannii

Binomial name
- Pedicularis kaufmannii Pinzger

= Pedicularis kaufmannii =

Species of flowering plant

Pedicularis kaufmannii is a species of flowering plant belonging to the family Orobanchaceae.

It is native to Eurasia.
