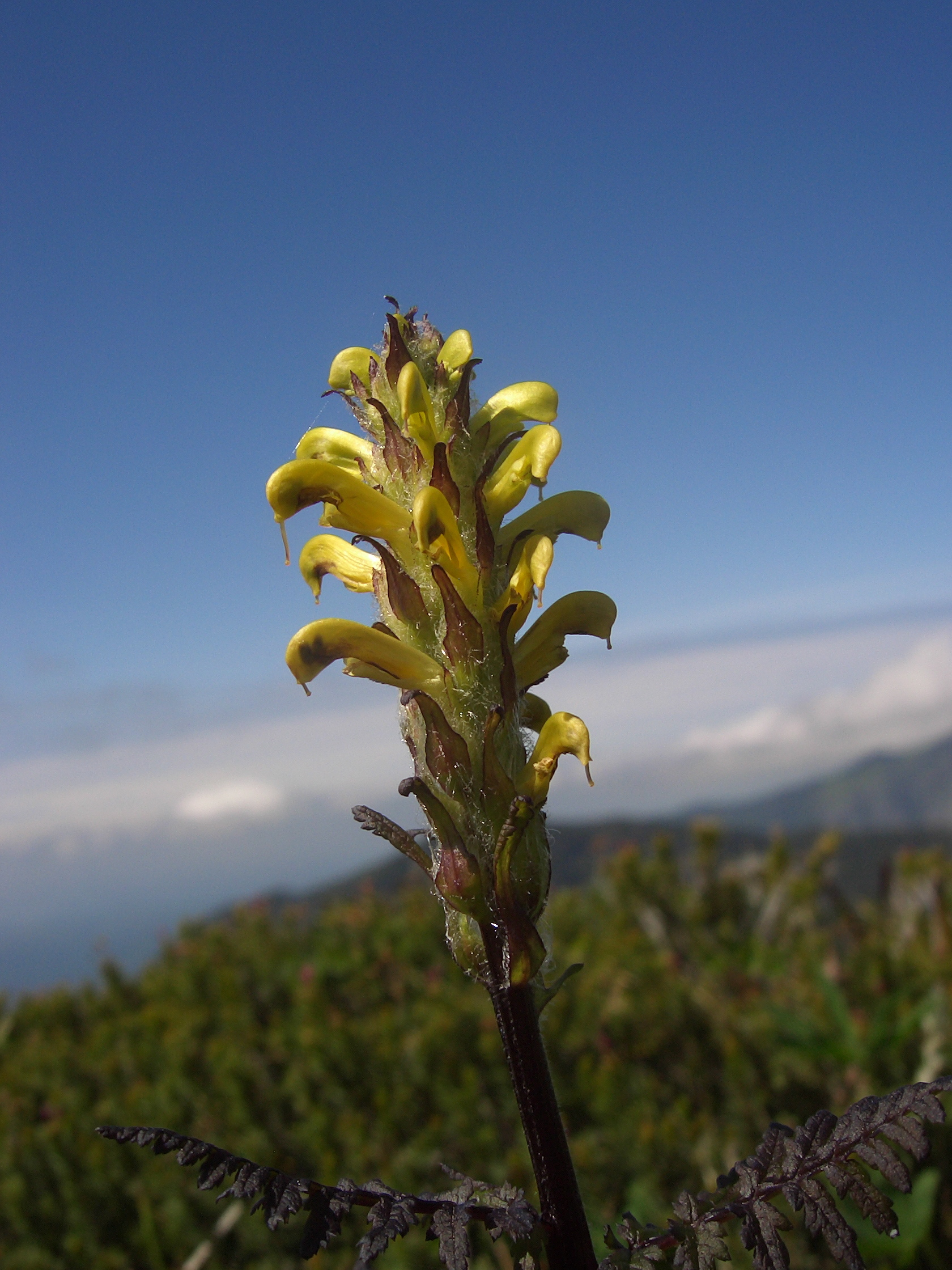

Scientific classification
- Kingdom: Plantae
- Clade: Tracheophytes
- Clade: Angiosperms
- Clade: Eudicots
- Clade: Asterids
- Order: Lamiales
- Family: Orobanchaceae
- Genus: Pedicularis
- Species: P. rainierensis

Binomial name
- Pedicularis rainierensis Pennell and Warren

= Pedicularis rainierensis =

Species of flowering plant

Pedicularis rainierensis is a species of flowering plant in the family Orobanchaceae commonly known as Mount Rainier lousewort. It is endemic to the vicinity of Mount Rainier in Washington state.

The Mount Rainier lousewort has a imperiled status.

== Description ==
Pedicularis rainierensis is a fibrous-rooted, perennial herb that is 1.5-4 decimeters long. The basal leaves are numerous, 5-15 centimeters long and up to 3 centimeters wide. The fruits' capsules are hairless, flattened, and often slighted winged. The flowers have a spikelike raceme topping an unbranched stem. The corolla is yellowish in color, about 1.5 centimeters long, and 2-lipped.

== Gallery ==
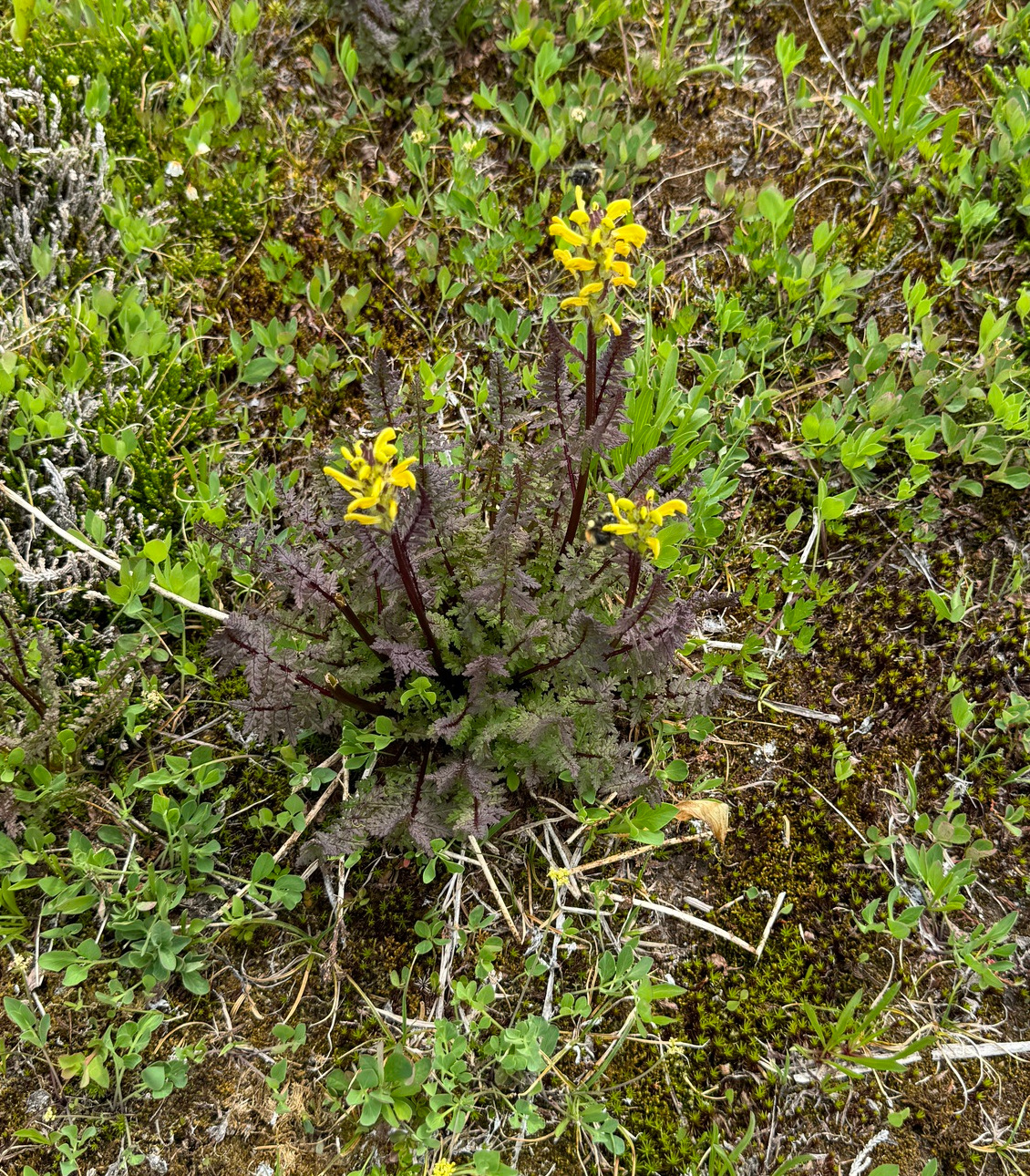
Whole plant

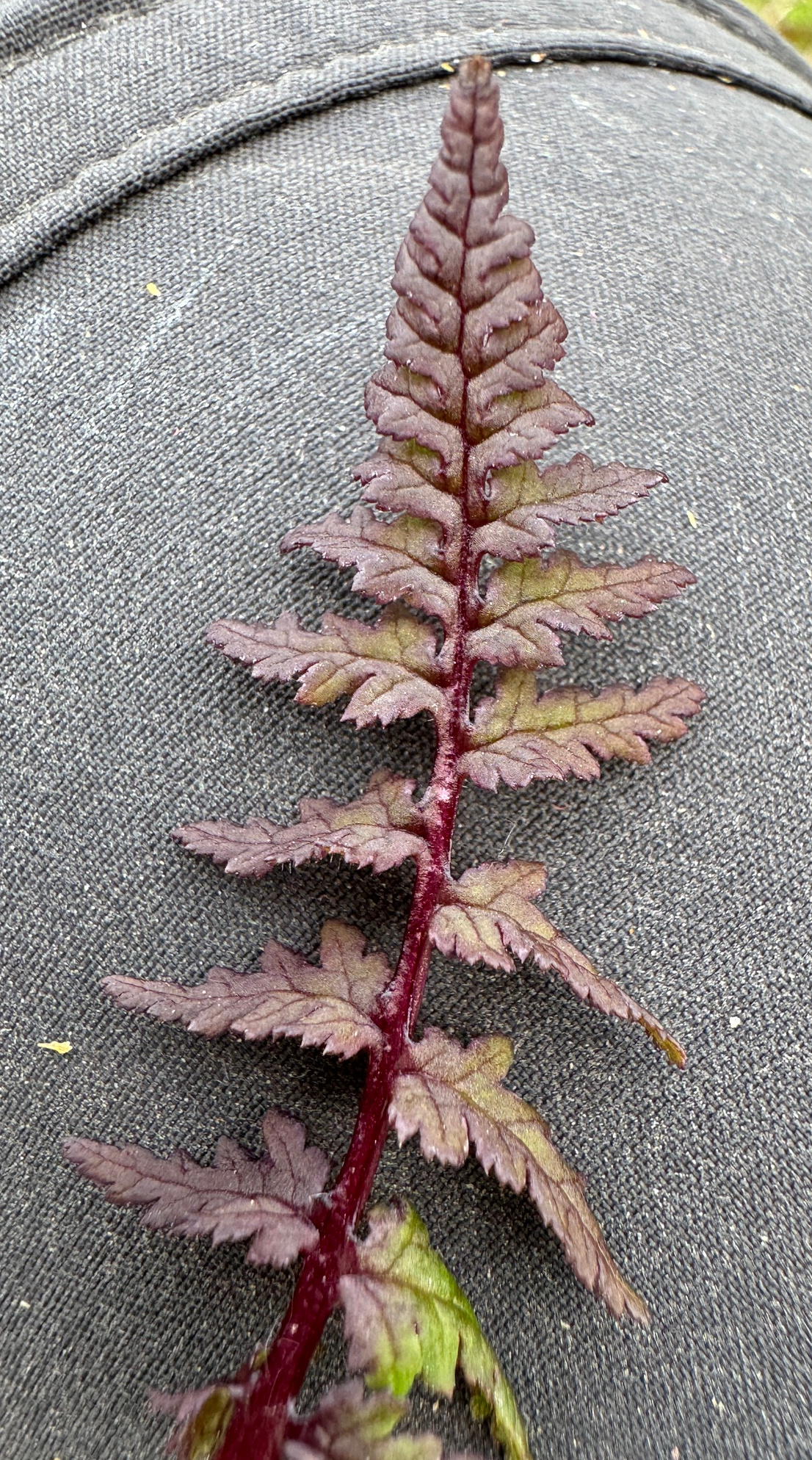
Leaf

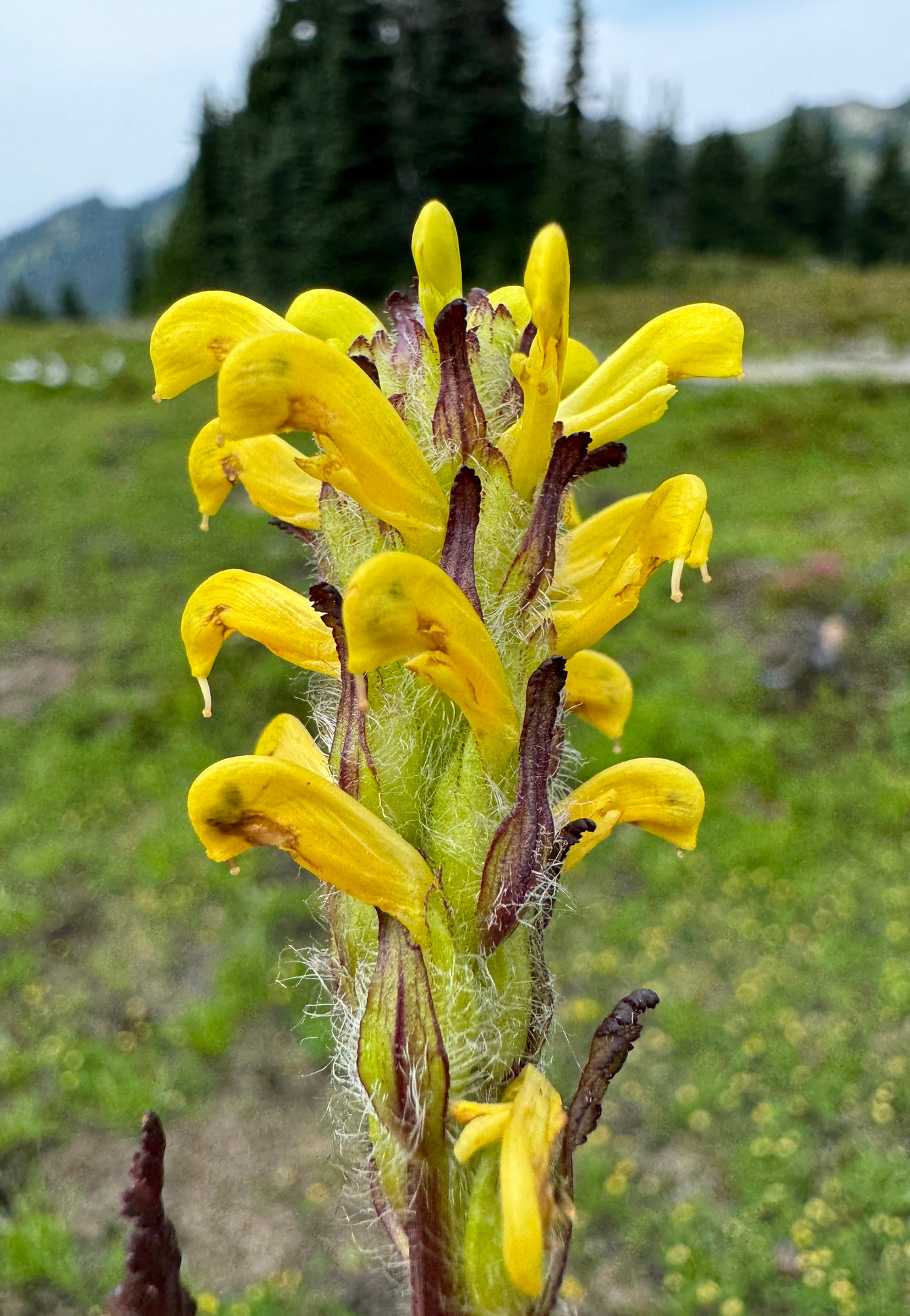
Flowers

== Sources ==
- Biek, David (2000), Flora of Mount Rainier National Park, Corvallis: Oregon State University Press
- Camp, Pamela; Gamon, John G. (2011), Field Guide to the Rare Plants of Washington, Seattle and London: University of Washington Press, ISBN 9780295990927
- Mathews, Daniel (1999), Cascade-Olympic Natural History: A Trailside Reference, Portland, Oregon: Raven Editions, ISBN 9780962078217
