= Pedicularis cacuminidenta =

Conservation status
- Least Concern (IUCN 3.1)

Scientific classification
- Kingdom: Plantae
- Clade: Tracheophytes
- Clade: Angiosperms
- Clade: Eudicots
- Clade: Asterids
- Order: Lamiales
- Family: Orobanchaceae
- Genus: Pedicularis
- Species: P. cacuminidenta

Binomial name
- Pedicularis cacuminidenta T.Yamaz

Species of flowering plant

Pedicularis cacuminidenta is a species of flowering plant belonging to the family Orobanchaceae, the broomrapes. This species is endemic to Bhutan.

== Taxonomy ==
Pedicularis cacuminidenta was first formally described in 2003 by the Japanese botanist Takasi Yamazaki. Yamazaki was describing specimens which had been collected, along with other specimens of Pedicularis species, in Bhutan in 2000 by Mr and Mrs Miehe of Georg-Augst University，Göttingen. The holotype of P. cacumindenta given as Gasa District, Baiteng at an altituude of 5,060 m (16,600 ft), northeast of Gangla Karchung. The genus Pedicularis is classified in the broomrape family Orobanchaceae.

== Description ==
Pedicularis cacuminidenta is a perennial herb with a thick corm with many fibrous roots. It has a simple erect stem which reaches a height of 9 to 10 cm (3.5 to 3.9 in). It has alternate, pubescent oblong leaves. There is a desne spike flowers near the tip of teh stem which are sessile and are located in the uppermost leaf axil. They have a tubular clayx with pink, purple veined petals.

== Distributuion and habitat ==
Pedicularis cacuminidenta is endemic to Bhutan where it is known from three localities: Lamcheng in Thimphu District at an altitude of 4,620 m (15,160 ft); as well as Bonte La in the vicinity of Tshophu Lake in Paro District. This broomrape is found in rocky grassland on both slopes and level ground. The holotype was collected in assocuation with the grass Kobresia nepalensis. Like other members of the genus Pedicularis, this plant is hemiparasitic (or parasitic) plant that draws nutrients from the root systems of neighbouring vegetation.
