= Pedicularis howellii =

Scientific classification
- Kingdom: Plantae
- Clade: Tracheophytes
- Clade: Angiosperms
- Clade: Eudicots
- Clade: Asterids
- Order: Lamiales
- Family: Orobanchaceae
- Genus: Pedicularis
- Species: P. howellii

Binomial name
- Pedicularis howellii A.Gray

Species of flowering plant

Pedicularis howellii is an uncommon species of flowering plant in the family Orobanchaceae known by the common name Howell's lousewort. It is endemic to the Siskiyou Mountains of the Klamath Range in southern Oregon and northern California, where it grows on the edges of coniferous forests. This is a perennial herb producing one or more stems up to 45 centimetres (18 in) tall from a long caudex. The leaves are up to 20 centimetres (8 in) long, lance-shaped, and divided into many toothed oval lobes; those higher on the stem may be unlobed. The basal leaves fall away early. The inflorescence is a small raceme of flowers occupying the top of the stem. Each white to light purple flower is up to one centimetre (2/5 in) long and is sickle-shaped, with a curved beak-like upper lip and a three-lobed lower lip which may be tucked into the hairy mass of sepals. The plant is pollinated by bumblebees including Bombus mixtus. Between the flowers are hairy to woolly triangular bracts. The fruit is a capsule just under a centimeter long containing seeds with netted surfaces.

The plant probably relies on an adequate amount of snow in the area to keep enough moisture in the soil for germination the following season.
