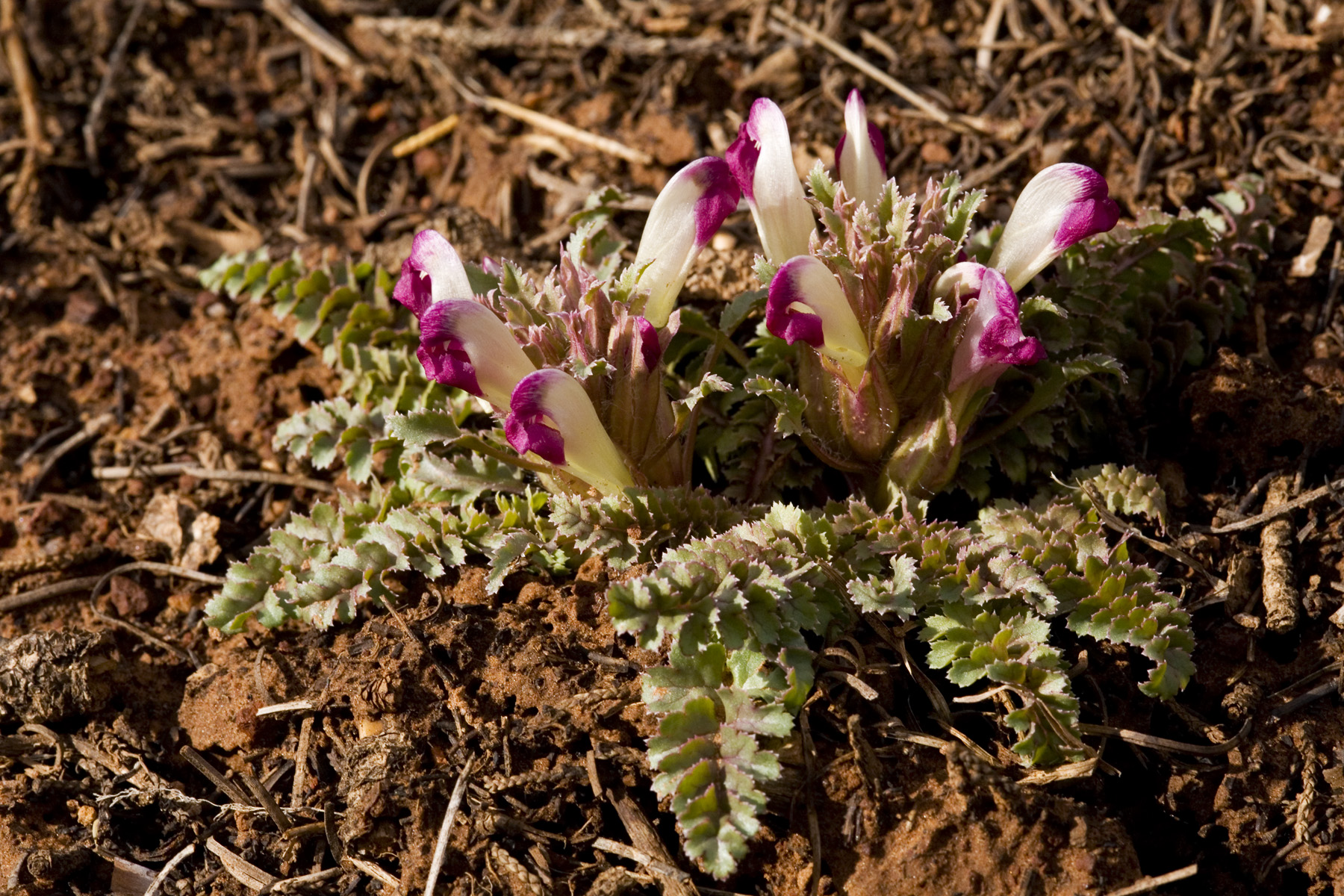
- In the Manzano Mountains, Torrance County, New Mexico

Conservation status
- Secure (NatureServe)

Scientific classification
- Kingdom: Plantae
- Clade: Tracheophytes
- Clade: Angiosperms
- Clade: Eudicots
- Clade: Asterids
- Order: Lamiales
- Family: Orobanchaceae
- Genus: Pedicularis
- Species: P. centranthera

Binomial name
- Pedicularis centranthera A.Gray

Varieties
- P. c. var. centranthera; P. c. var. exulans

= Pedicularis centranthera =

Plant species in the broomrape family

Pedicularis centranthera is a species of flowering plant in the family Orobanchaceae known by the common names dwarf lousewort and Great Basin lousewort. It is native to the western United States from eastern Oregon and California to Colorado and New Mexico, where it grows in sagebrush and other basin and plateau habitat.

== Description ==
Dwarf lousewort is a perennial plant with a tuberous root. Its leaves are in a ground level rosette and usually measure 6–15 centimeters long including the leaf stem, but occasionally can reach 30 cm. The leaf stems are short, just 2–10 millimeters. Lower leaves are narrow and grass-like without divisions or teath. The upper leaves are pinnatifid, divided up and feather like. The divisions of the upper leaves are egg-shaped and have teeth along their edges and a wrinkled texture. The inflorescence is a short raceme bearing many long, protruding, club-shaped flowers. Each flower may exceed 4 centimeters in length and is white or pale purple with dark purple tips on the wide ends of its upper and lower lips. The sepals of the flowers are shorter and hairy. The fruit is a capsule around centimeter long containing seeds with netlike surfaces.

== Taxonomy ==
Pedicularis centranthera was named and scientifically described by Asa Gray in 1859. It is classified in the genus Pedicularis as part of the family Orobanchaceae. It has two accepted varieties:

- Pedicularis centranthera var. centranthera – Widespread from New Mexico to Oregon
- Pedicularis centranthera var. exulans – Endemic to Oregon

== Range and habitat ==
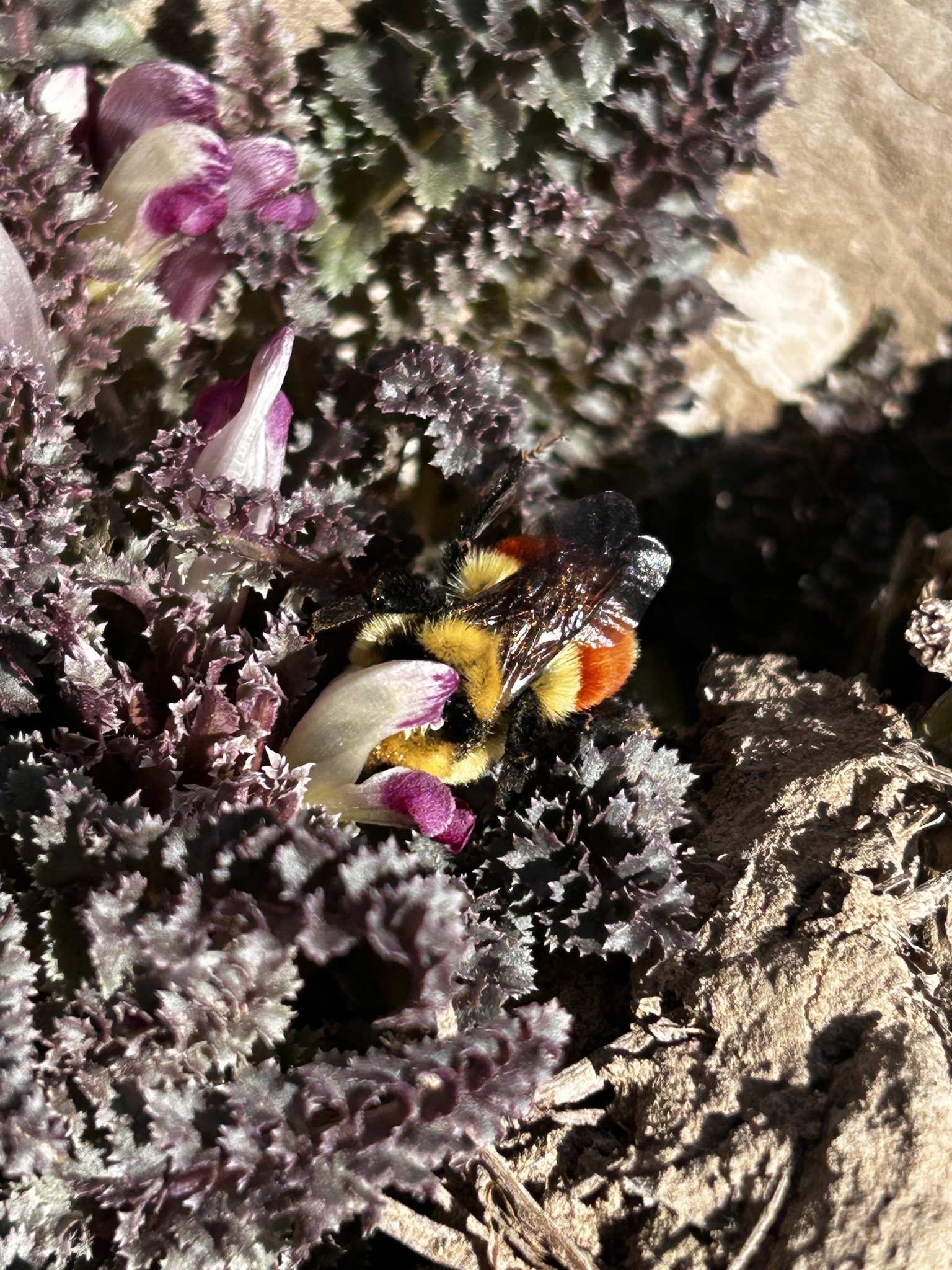
Flower with bumblebee (Bombus huntii) Millard County, Utah

The native range for dwarf lousewort is the western United States including Arizona, California, Colorado, Nevada, New Mexico, and Utah. In California it grows only in the northeast the Warner Mountains and the Modoc Plateau. In Oregon it similarly is reported in just Lake and Harney counties in the southwest of the state. It is found in the western two-thirds of Nevada and southern Utah. It is reported in many of the counties of Arizona, five in the northwest of New Mexico, and five in western Colorado.

It is associated with pinyon–juniper woodlands, ponderosa pine forests, and other yellow pines.
