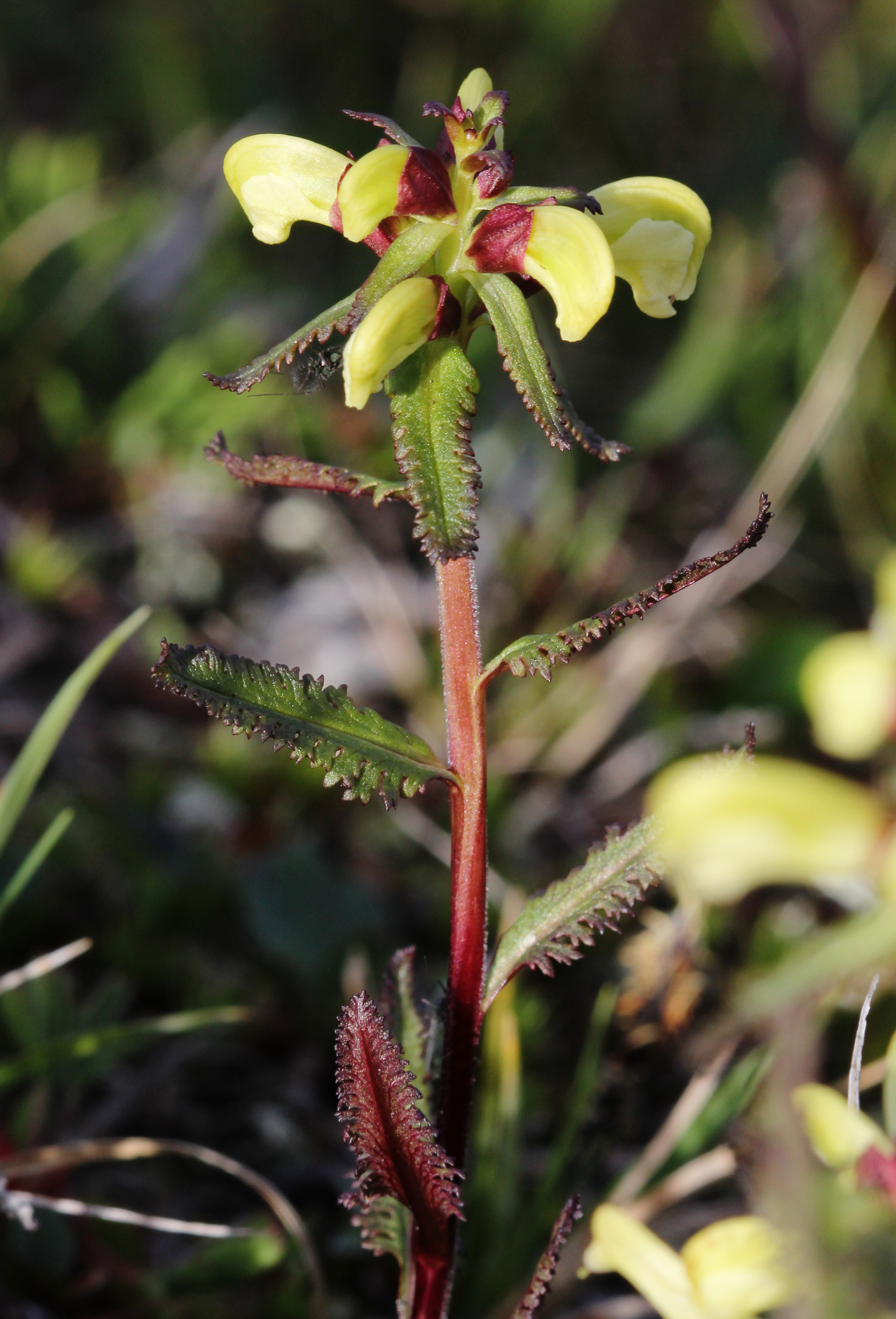

Scientific classification
- Kingdom: Plantae
- Clade: Tracheophytes
- Clade: Angiosperms
- Clade: Eudicots
- Clade: Asterids
- Order: Lamiales
- Family: Orobanchaceae
- Genus: Pedicularis
- Species: P. lapponica

Binomial name
- Pedicularis lapponica L., 1753

Synonyms
- Pedicularis euphrasioides Cham.; Pedicularis obliqua Adams

= Pedicularis lapponica =

Species of flowering plant

Pedicularis lapponica, the Lapland lousewort, is a perennial hemiparasitic species of flowering plant in the family Orobanchaceae with yellow to creme coloured flowers.

== Description ==
The plant has an unbranched (or very rarely branched) stem of 10–25 cm tall which grows from a creeping rootstock with long slender rhizomes. No rosette is present. Stem leaves are narrow, elongated, and compound with toothed sections, the lower on long petioles. The inflorescence is capitate. The corolla is up to 2 centimeters long and is usually milk white. It is surrounded by toothed sepals. The fruit is a flat, beaked capsule 8–13 millimetres (0.31–0.51 in) long.

Compared to P. lanata, P. lapponica has a breeding system with a lower capacity for outcrossing in West Greenland (Disko) and less morphological variation.

It is perennial (in some cases biennial).

== Distribution ==
Pedicularis lapponica is widely distributed on the northern hemisphere in the arctic and boreal zone.

In Greenland it is found in West Greenland between 62°N and 72°30’N and in East Greenland between 69°N and Bessel Fjord, 75°58'N.

== Habitat and ecology ==
Pedicularis lapponica is hemiparasitic on a number of host species. It is found in arctic to alpine tundras, heathlands, moist hummocky tundras, and dwarf shrub heath.
