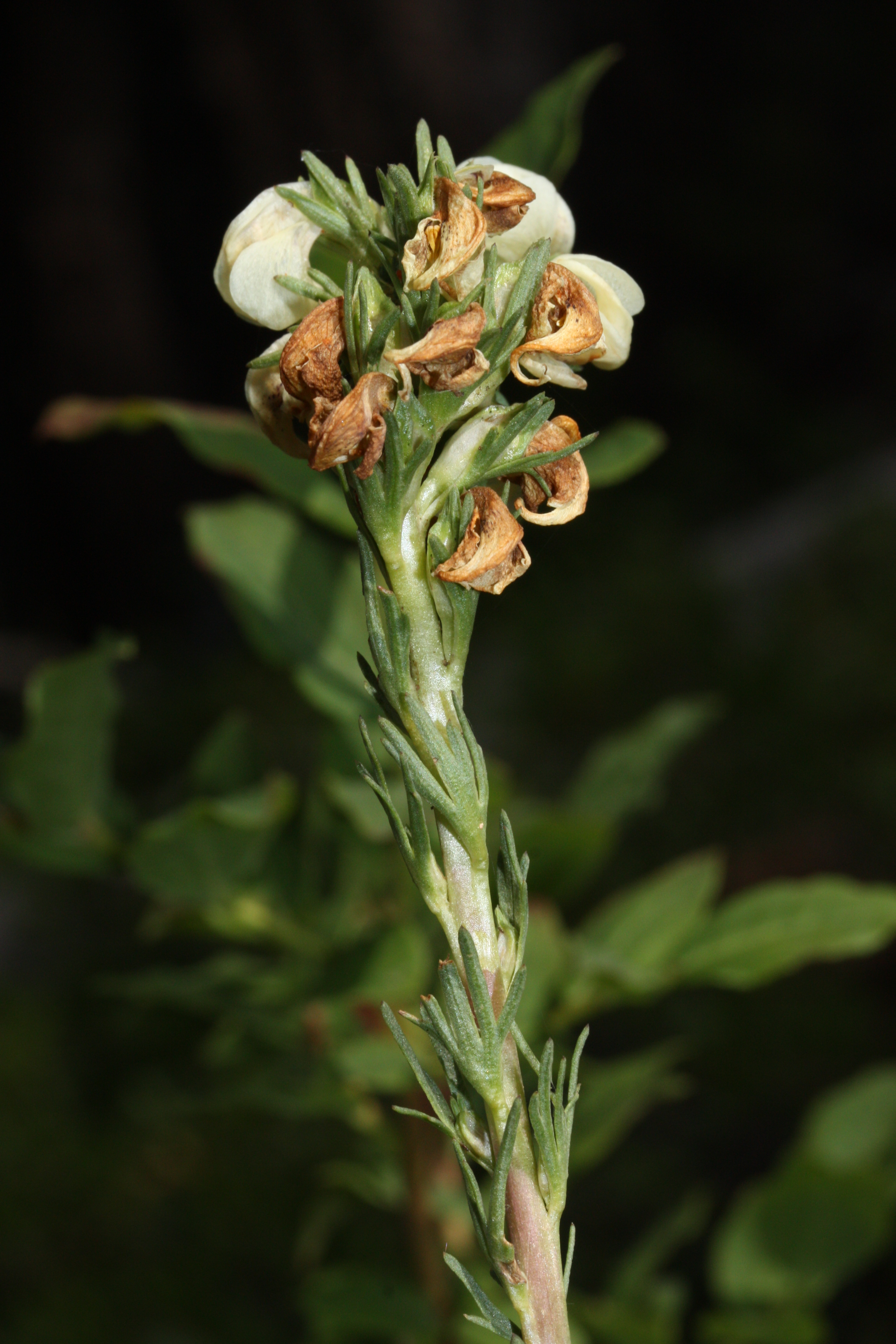

Scientific classification
- Kingdom: Plantae
- Clade: Tracheophytes
- Clade: Angiosperms
- Clade: Eudicots
- Clade: Asterids
- Order: Lamiales
- Family: Orobanchaceae
- Genus: Pedicularis
- Species: P. contorta

Binomial name
- Pedicularis contorta Benth.

= Pedicularis contorta =

Species of flowering plant

Pedicularis contorta is a species of flowering plant in the family Orobanchaceae known by the common names coiled lousewort and curved-beak lousewort. It is native to western North America, including southwestern Canada and the northwestern United States, where it grows in moist mountainous habitat, such as bogs, shady forests, and meadows. It is a perennial herb producing one or more stems up to 40 centimetres (16 in) tall from a caudex. The leaves are up to 18 centimetres (7.1 in) long, lance-shaped to oblong, and divided into many linear lobes which may be toothed or smooth-edged. The inflorescence is a raceme of flowers occupying the top of the stem. Each flower is a centimeter long or slightly longer, white to yellowish in color, and divided into a coiled or curved beak-like upper lip and a flat, three-lobed lower lip. The fruit is a capsule up to a centimeter long containing seeds with netted surfaces.
