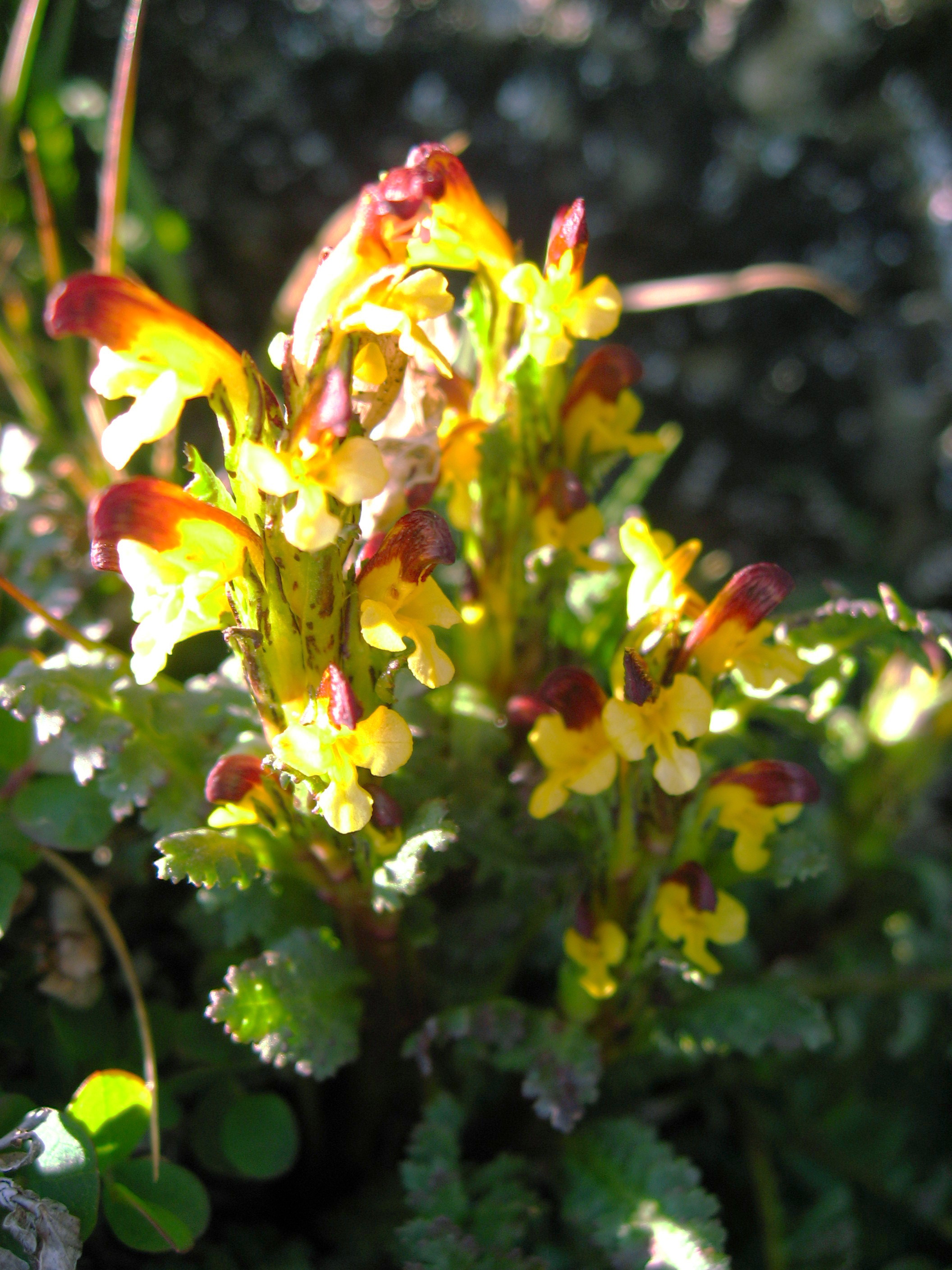

Scientific classification
- Kingdom: Plantae
- Clade: Tracheophytes
- Clade: Angiosperms
- Clade: Eudicots
- Clade: Asterids
- Order: Lamiales
- Family: Orobanchaceae
- Genus: Pedicularis
- Species: P. flammea

Binomial name
- Pedicularis flammea L.

= Pedicularis flammea =

Species of flowering plant

Pedicularis flammea is a species of flowering plant belonging to the family Orobanchaceae.

Its native range is Subarctic America to Eastern Canada, Northern Europe.
