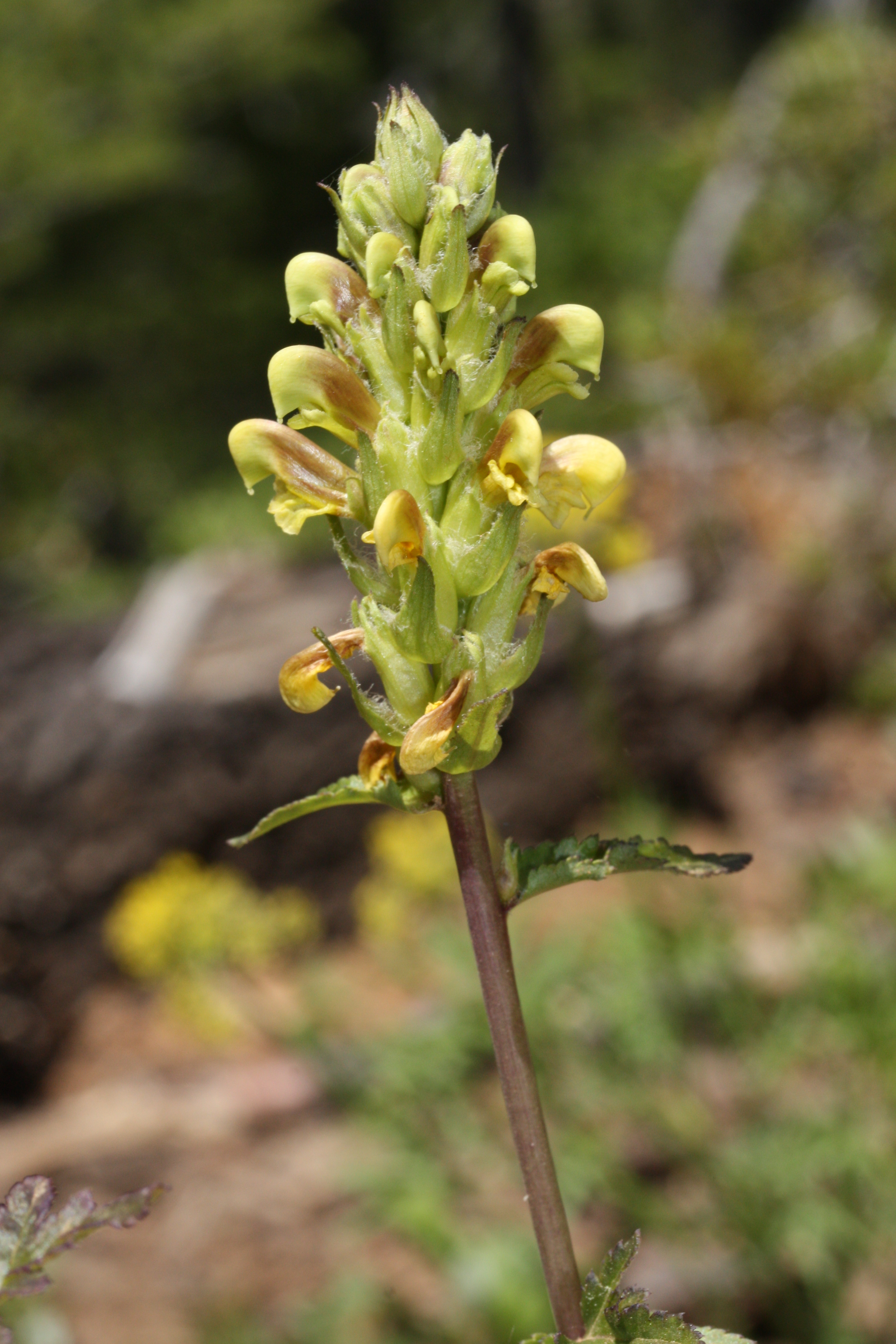
- Pedicularis bracteosa

Scientific classification
- Kingdom: Plantae
- Clade: Embryophytes
- Clade: Tracheophytes
- Clade: Spermatophytes
- Clade: Angiosperms
- Clade: Eudicots
- Clade: Asterids
- Order: Lamiales
- Family: Orobanchaceae
- Tribe: Pedicularideae
- Genus: Pedicularis; L.\

Species
- 650+, see text

Synonyms
- List: Elephantella Rydb.; Enslenia Raf.; Nelensia Poir.; Pediculariopsis Á.Löve & D.Löve; Prosopia Rchb.; Scepanium Ehrh.; Sceptrum J.O.Rudbeck ex Hartm.

= Pedicularis =

Genus of flowering plants in the broomrape family

Pedicularis is a genus of perennial green root parasite plants currently placed in the family Orobanchaceae (the genus previously having been placed in Scrophulariaceae sensu lato).

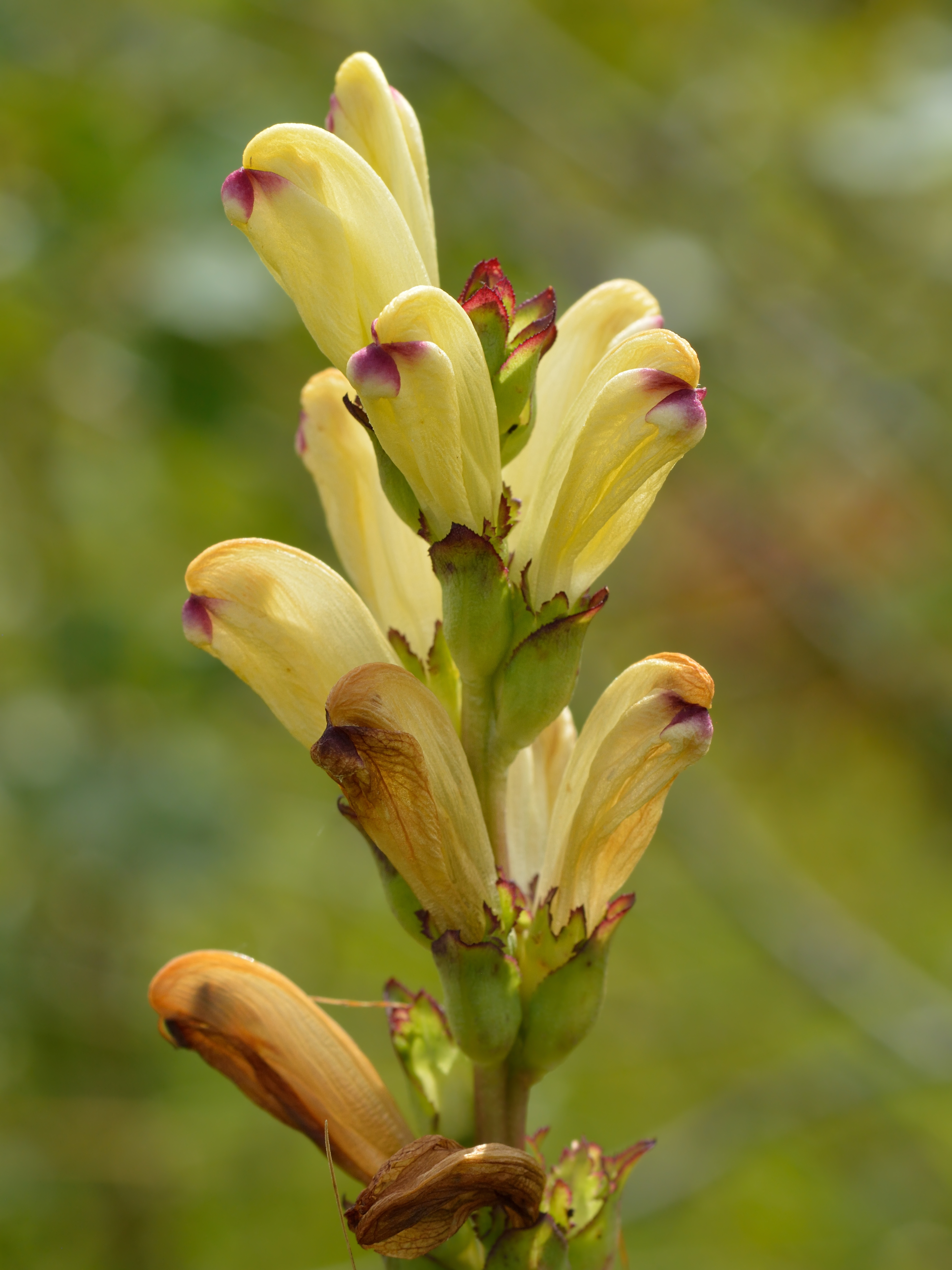
Pedicularis sceptrum-carolinum (Moor-king lousewort)

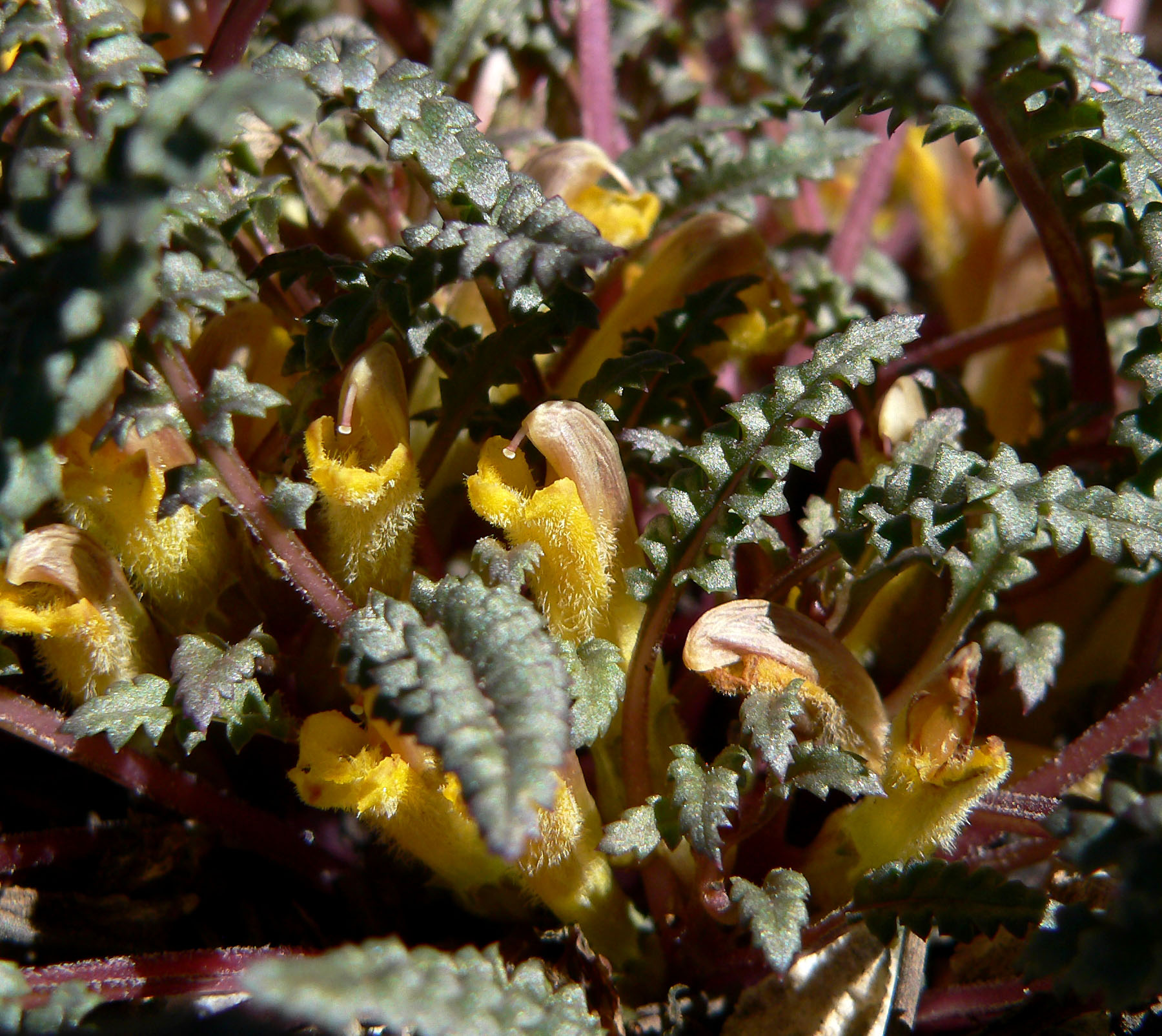
Pedicularis semibarbata ssp charlestonensis (pinewoods lousewort)

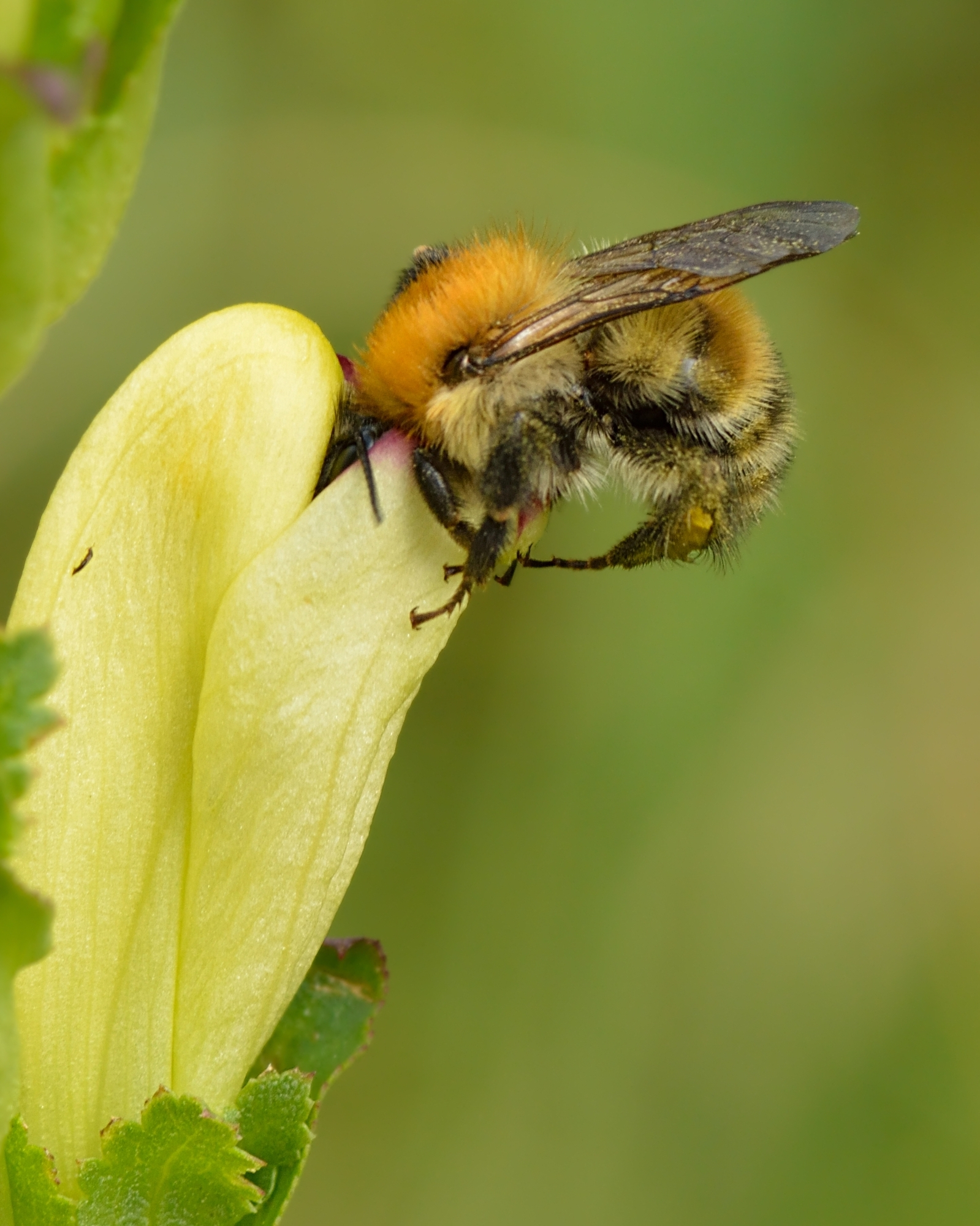
Pollination

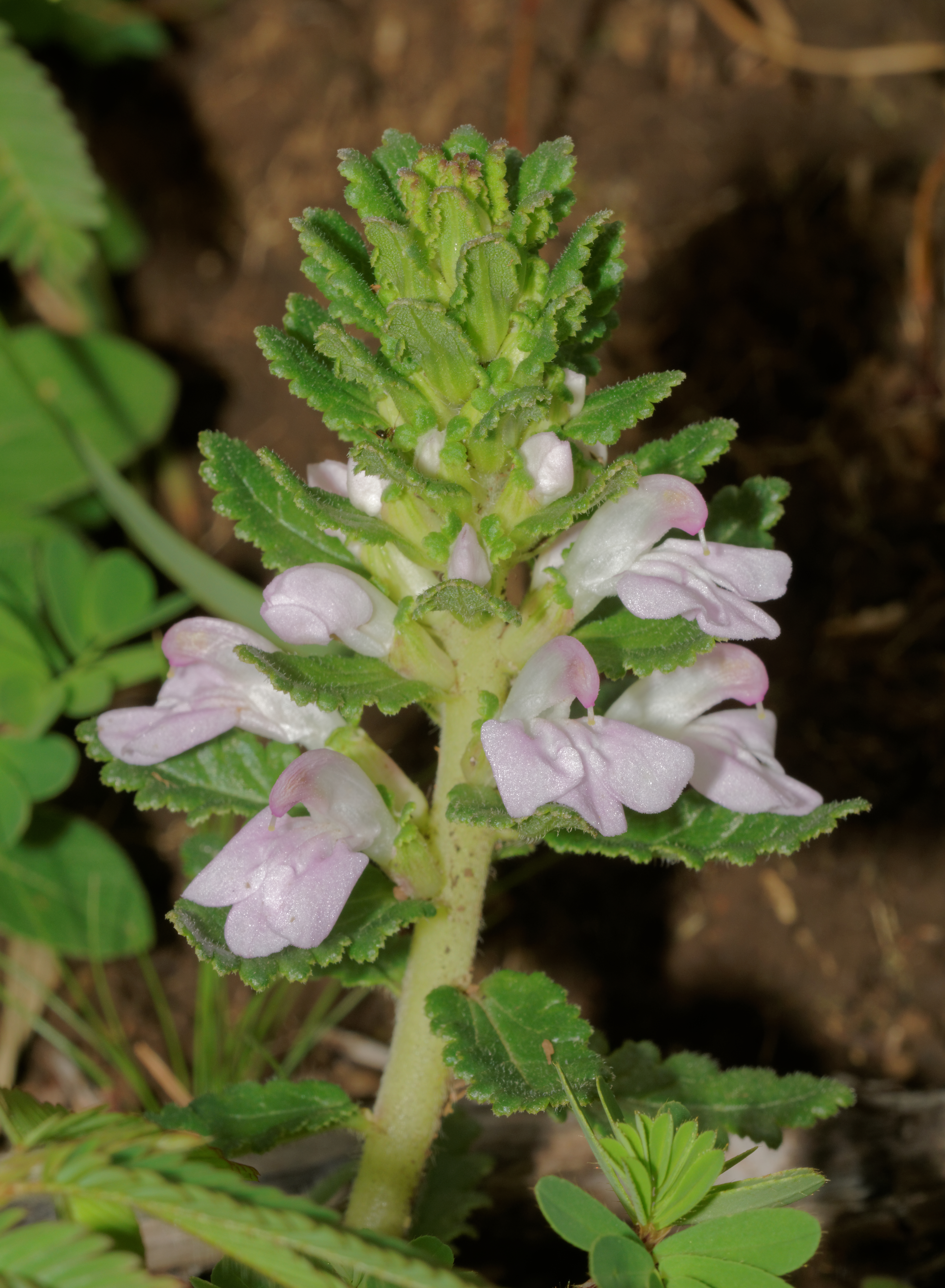
Pedicularis zeylanica

== Uses ==
Pedicularis is used medicinally in teas and smoking blends.

== Taxonomy ==
The common name lousewort, applied to several species, derives from an old belief that these plants, when ingested, were responsible for lice infestations in livestock. The genus name Pedicularis is from the Latin pediculus meaning louse. Over 600 species are accepted, mostly from the wetter northern temperate zones, as well as from South America. The highest diversity is in eastern Asia, with 352 species accepted in China alone.

=== Selected species ===
- Pedicularis attollens (little elephant's head)
- Pedicularis bhutanomuscoides
- Pedicularis bracteosa (fern-leaf, towering, or bracted lousewort)

Pedicularis caeruleoalbescens Wendelbo

- Pedicularis cacuminidenta
- Pedicularis canadensis (Canadian lousewort)
- Pedicularis centranthera
- Pedicularis contorta (coiled lousewort or white-coiled beak lousewort)
- Pedicularis dasyantha (woolly lousewort)
- Pedicularis densiflora (Indian warrior)
- Pedicularis dhurensis
- Pedicularis dudleyi (Dudley's lousewort)
- Pedicularis elephantiflora
- Pedicularis flammea (redrattle)
- Pedicularis foliosa (leafy lousewort)
- Pedicularis furbishiae (Furbish's lousewort)
- Pedicularis groenlandica (elephant's head)
- Pedicularis hirsuta (hairy lousewort)
- Pedicularis howellii (Howell's lousewort)
- Pedicularis kaufmannii
- Pedicularis lanata
- Pedicularis lanceolata
- Pedicularis lapponica (Lapland lousewort)
- Pedicularis oederi (crimson-tipped lousewort)
- Pedicularis ornithorhyncha (duck's-bill/bird's-beak lousewort)
- Pedicularis oxycarpa
- Pedicularis palustris (marsh lousewort)
- Pedicularis parryi (Parry's lousewort)
- Pedicularis procera (giant lousewort)
- Pedicularis racemosa (sickle-top lousewort, parrot's beak)
- Pedicularis rainierensis (Mount Rainier lousewort)
- Pedicularis rostratocapitata
- Pedicularis sceptrum-carolinum (Moor-king lousewort)
- Pedicularis semibarbata (pinewoods lousewort)
- Pedicularis sudetica (fernweed, Sudeten lousewort or Sedetic lousewort)
- Pedicularis sylvatica (common lousewort)
- Pedicularis verticillata (verticillate lousewort)

== Pollination ==
Bombus polaris has an essential role in the pollination of the large zygomorphic flowers of Pedicularis. B. polaris has a special adaption that allows it to work the spikes of Pedicularis from the bottom towards the top.
