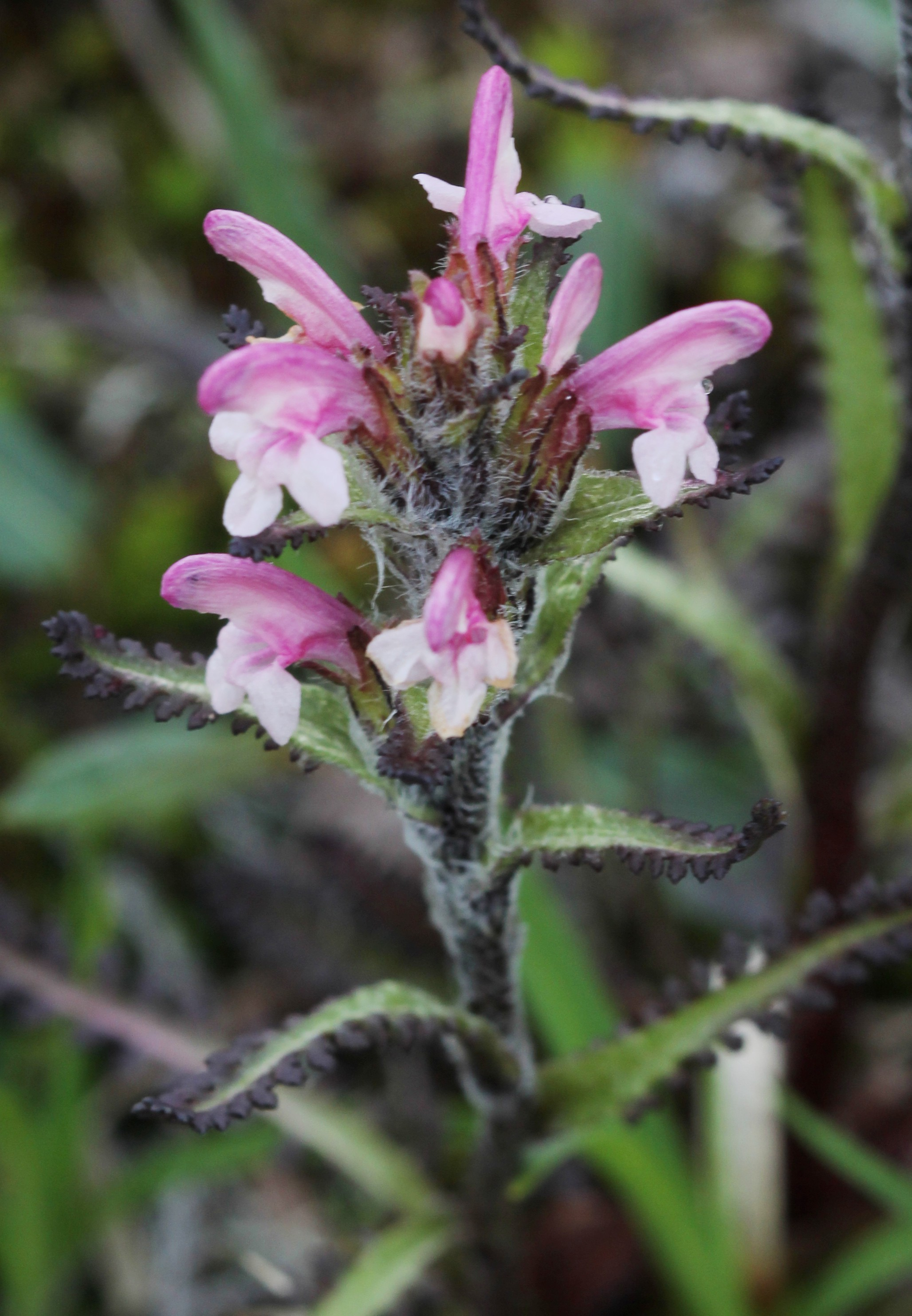

Scientific classification
- Kingdom: Plantae
- Clade: Tracheophytes
- Clade: Angiosperms
- Clade: Eudicots
- Clade: Asterids
- Order: Lamiales
- Family: Orobanchaceae
- Genus: Pedicularis
- Species: P. hirsuta

Binomial name
- Pedicularis hirsuta L.

= Pedicularis hirsuta =

Species of flowering plant

Pedicularis hirsuta, commonly known as hairy lousewort, is a species of flowering plant belonging to the family Orobanchaceae. It is a semi-parasitic plant.

Its native range is subarctic.

== Description ==
Pedicularis hirsuta is a low, solitary herb growing from a tap root. It has one or more rosettes of hairy, linear leaves born on long petioles. The leaves are shallowly pinnately-lobed, sheathing at the base and up to 5 cm (2 in) long. One or more erect flowering stems grow from each rosette, up to 10 cm (4 in) tall. The flowers alternate with long, pinnately-lobed bracts. The calyx is toothed, tubular and fused. The corolla is partially tubed and has two-lips and long, floccose hairs. The upper lip is hooded and the lower lip has three lobes. The fruit is a single-chambered capsule containing many small brown seeds.

== Distribution ==
This plant is found on tundra in the subarctic regions of North America and Europe, extending southwards on mountains in northern Europe to the boreal zone.

== Ecology ==
Pedicularis hirsuta grows on well-vegetated herb-mats and heaths, both fairly dry and moist, and on various types of soil, but tending to avoid extremely acid sites. Because of its semi-parasitic nature, it is seldom found in scantily vegetated habitats. The flowers may be pollinated by bumblebees when present, but in Svalbard, pollination is mostly by flies, with self-pollination also occurring. The fruits have stiff stems and open at the apex, thus facilitating ballistic dispersal. This plant does not appear to be grazed by geese or reindeer to any significant extent.
