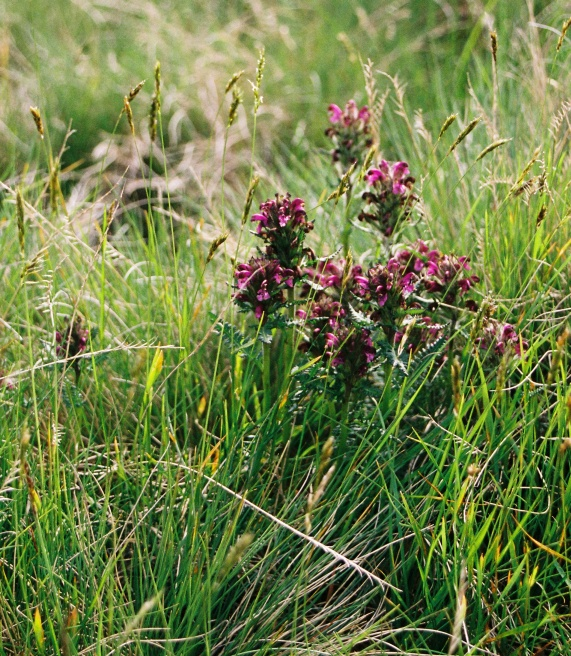

Scientific classification
- Kingdom: Plantae
- Clade: Embryophytes
- Clade: Tracheophytes
- Clade: Spermatophytes
- Clade: Angiosperms
- Clade: Eudicots
- Clade: Asterids
- Order: Lamiales
- Family: Orobanchaceae
- Genus: Pedicularis
- Species: P. sudetica

Binomial name
- Pedicularis sudetica Willd.

= Pedicularis sudetica =

Species of flowering plant

Pedicularis sudetica, common names of which are fernweed, Sudeten lousewort, Sedetic lousewort, and Sudetic lousewort is a species of flowering plant in the family Orobanchaceae which is native to Eurasia and North America. The plant is both perennial and bisexual. It grows 0.3 m (1 ft 0 in) high with the flowers being hermaphrodite.
