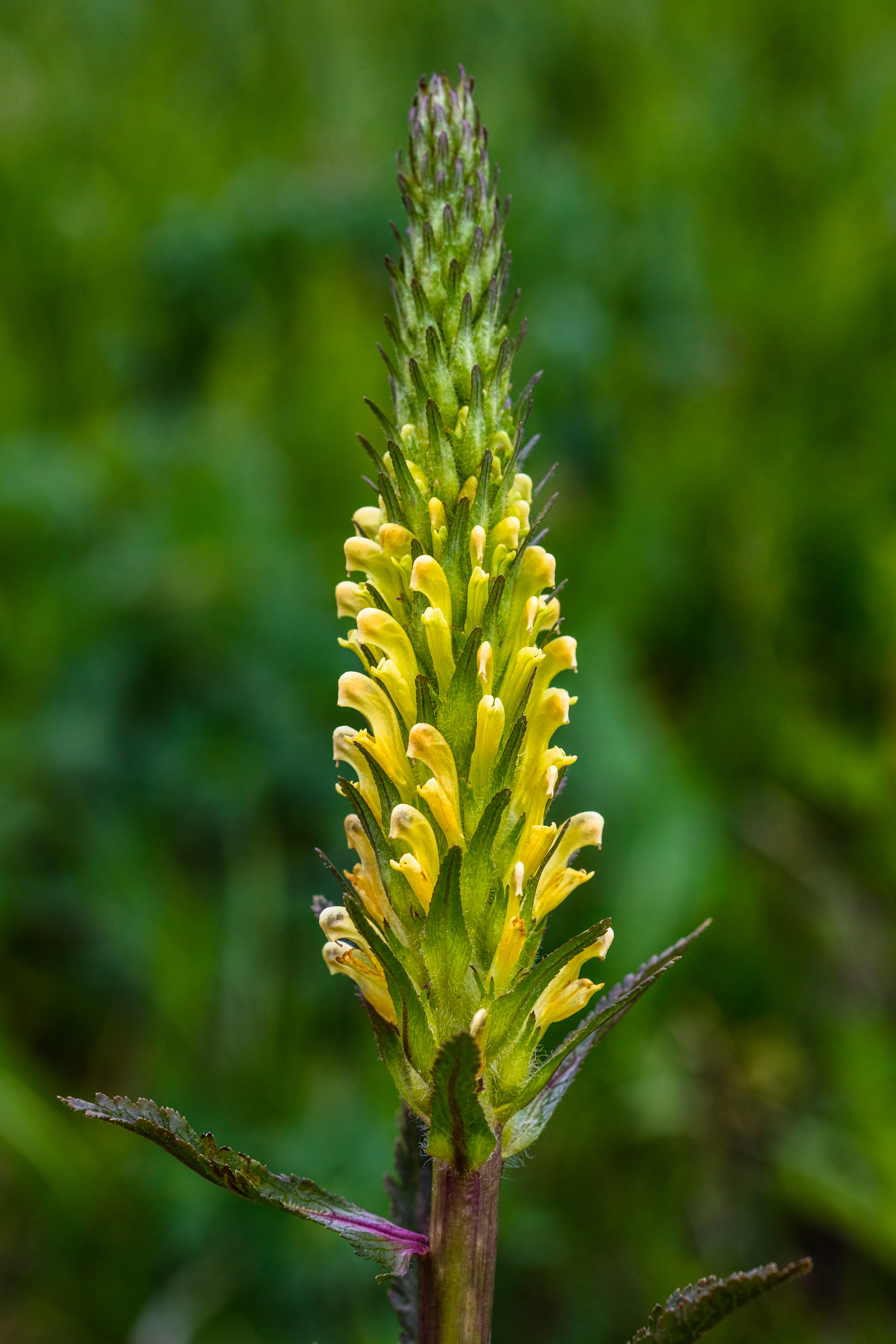
- Inflorescence

Conservation status
- Secure (NatureServe)

Scientific classification
- Kingdom: Plantae
- Clade: Tracheophytes
- Clade: Angiosperms
- Clade: Eudicots
- Clade: Asterids
- Order: Lamiales
- Family: Orobanchaceae
- Genus: Pedicularis
- Species: P. bracteosa

Binomial name
- Pedicularis bracteosa Benth.

= Pedicularis bracteosa =

Plant species in the broomrape family

Pedicularis bracteosa also known as bracted lousewort is a flowering deciduous perennial plant with alternating cauline leaves that are linear/oblong to lanceolate, approximately 1 to 7 cm long. It has fibrous roots and grows to approximately 1 meter high. Its flowers form in densely clustered spike raceme, and range in color from yellow to bronze to red to purple. Its distribution is found in western North America including New Mexico, Colorado, Montana, mountainous parts of Washington and California, and in British Columbia.

Historically, the leaves have been used as an alternative treatment for skeletal muscle relaxation.

== Taxonomy ==
Pedicularis bracteosa was scientifically described and named in 1838 by George Bentham. The species is classified in the genus Pedicularis as part of the family Orobanchaceae. It has eight accepted varieties according to Plants of the World Online.

- Pedicularis bracteosa var. atrosanguinea – British Columbia and Washington
- Pedicularis bracteosa var. bracteosa – Alberta, British Columbia, Washington, Idaho, and Montana
- Pedicularis bracteosa var. canbyi – Idaho and Montana
- Pedicularis bracteosa var. flavida – Washington, Oregon, and California
- Pedicularis bracteosa var. latifolia – British Columbia, Idaho, and Washtington
- Pedicularis bracteosa var. pachyrhiza – Eastern Washington and Oregon
- Pedicularis bracteosa var. paysoniana – The Rocky Mountain states from Montana to New Mexico
- Pedicularis bracteosa var. siifolia – Eastern Washington, Idaho, and Montana

All the varieties except for bracteosa were formerly described as species and it has thirteen synonyms in total.

Table of Synonyms
Name	Year	Rank	Synonym of:	Notes
Pedicularis atrosanguinea Pennell & J.W.Thomps.	1934	species	var. atrosanguinea	≡ hom.
Pedicularis bracteosa var. montanensis M.E.Jones	1910	variety	var. bracteosa	= het.
Pedicularis bracteosa subsp. paysoniana (Pennell) W.A.Weber	1983	subspecies	var. paysoniana	≡ hom.
Pedicularis canbyi A.Gray	1886	species	var. canbyi	≡ hom.
Pedicularis flavida Pennell	1934	species	var. flavida	≡ hom.
Pedicularis latifolia Pennell	1934	species	var. latifolia	≡ hom.
Pedicularis montanensis Rydb.	1897	species	var. bracteosa	= het.
Pedicularis pachyrhiza Pennell	1934	species	var. pachyrhiza	≡ hom.
Pedicularis paddoensis Pennell	1934	species	var. latifolia	= het.
Pedicularis paysoniana Pennell	1934	species	var. paysoniana	≡ hom.
Pedicularis recutita Pursh	1813	species	var. bracteosa	= het., nom. illeg.
Pedicularis siifolia Rydb.	1907	species	var. siifolia	≡ hom.
Pedicularis thompsonii Pennell	1934	species	var. latifolia	= het.
Notes: ≡ homotypic synonym; = heterotypic synonym

=== Names ===
The species name bracteosa is Botanical Latin for having bracts. It is similarly known by the common names bracted lousewort, as well as towering lousewort, tall lousewort, or fernleaf for its size and appearance.

== Gallery ==
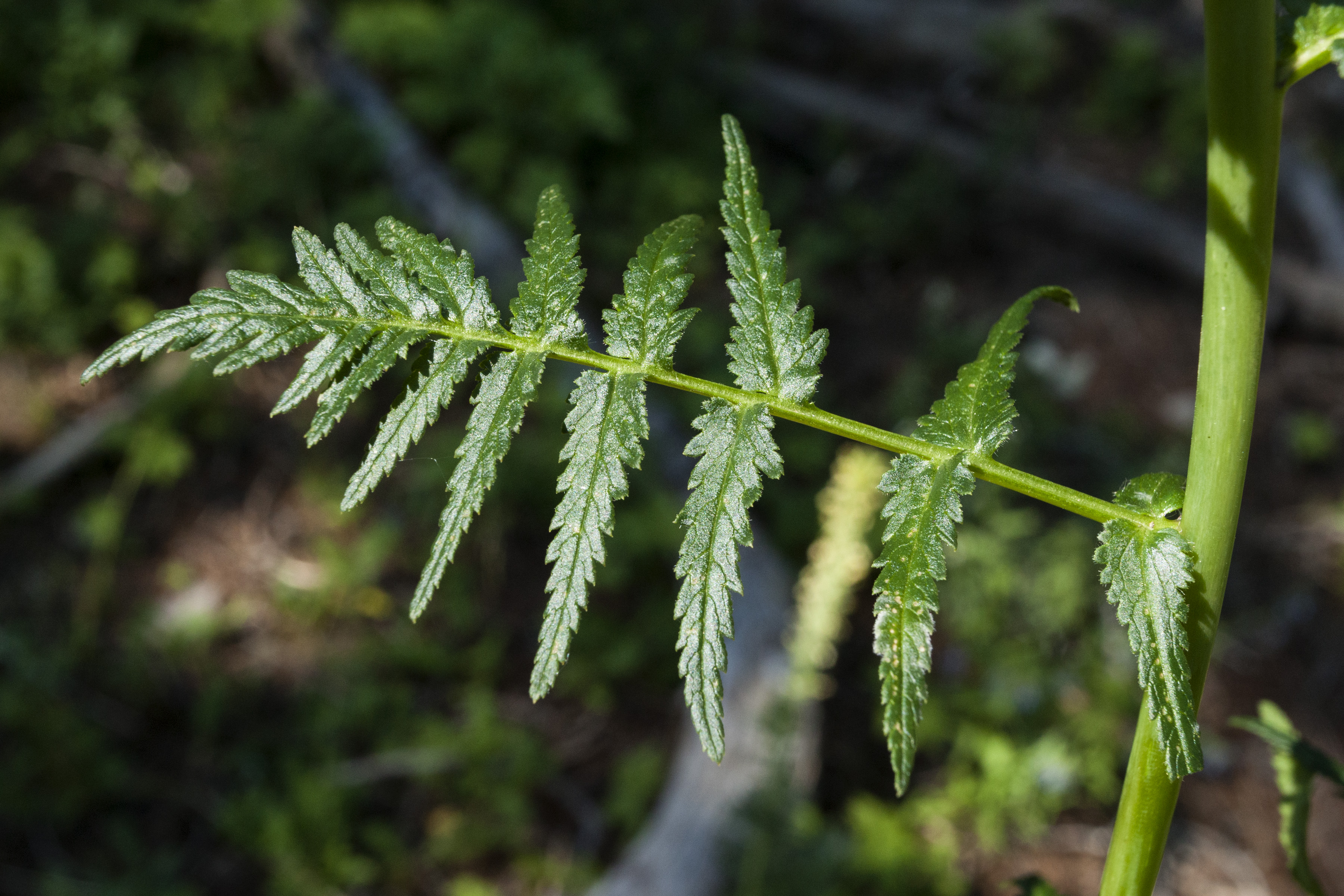
Pedicularis bracteosa leaf structure

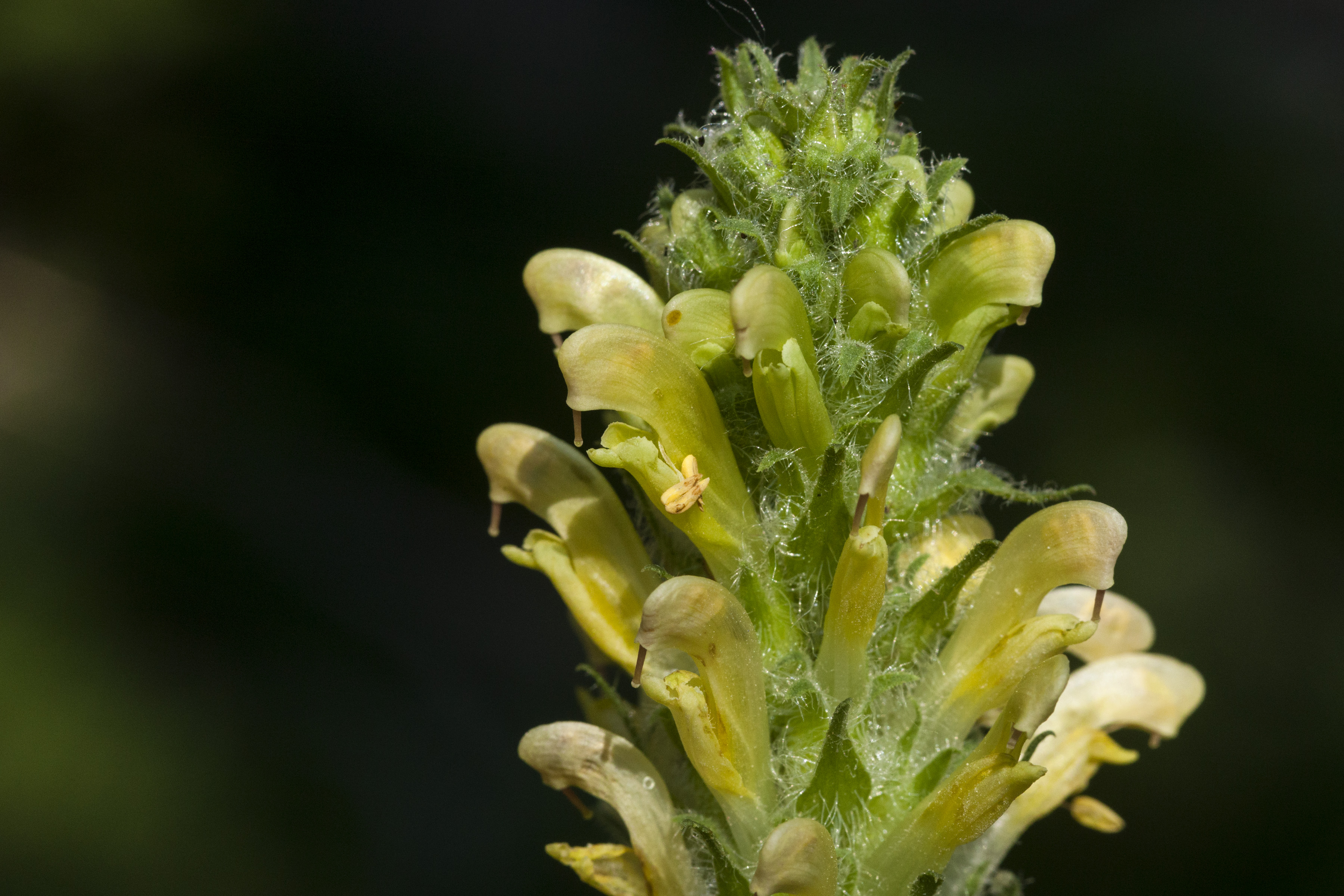
Pedicularis bracteosa flower detail

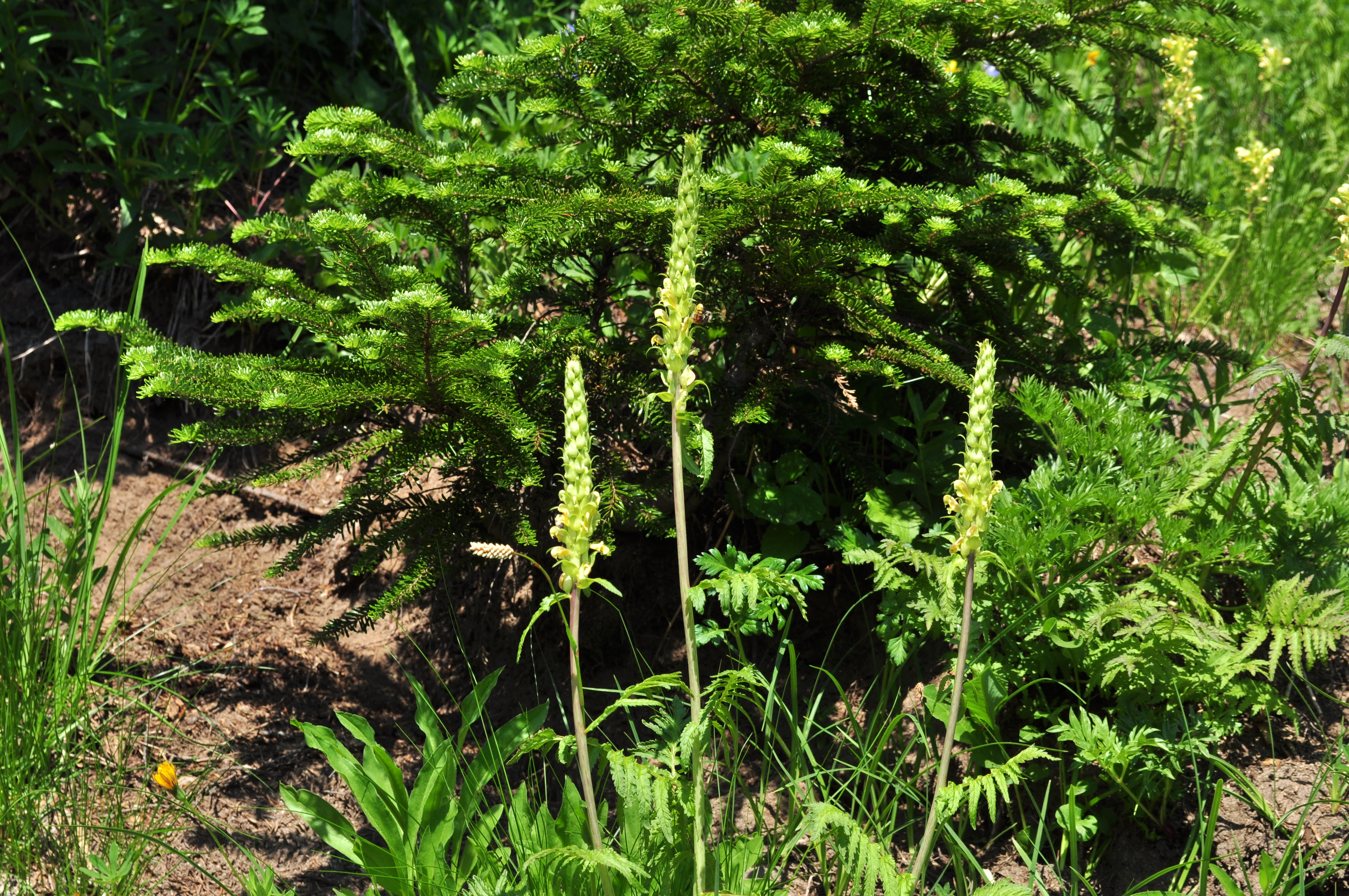
Pedicularis bracteosa in flower

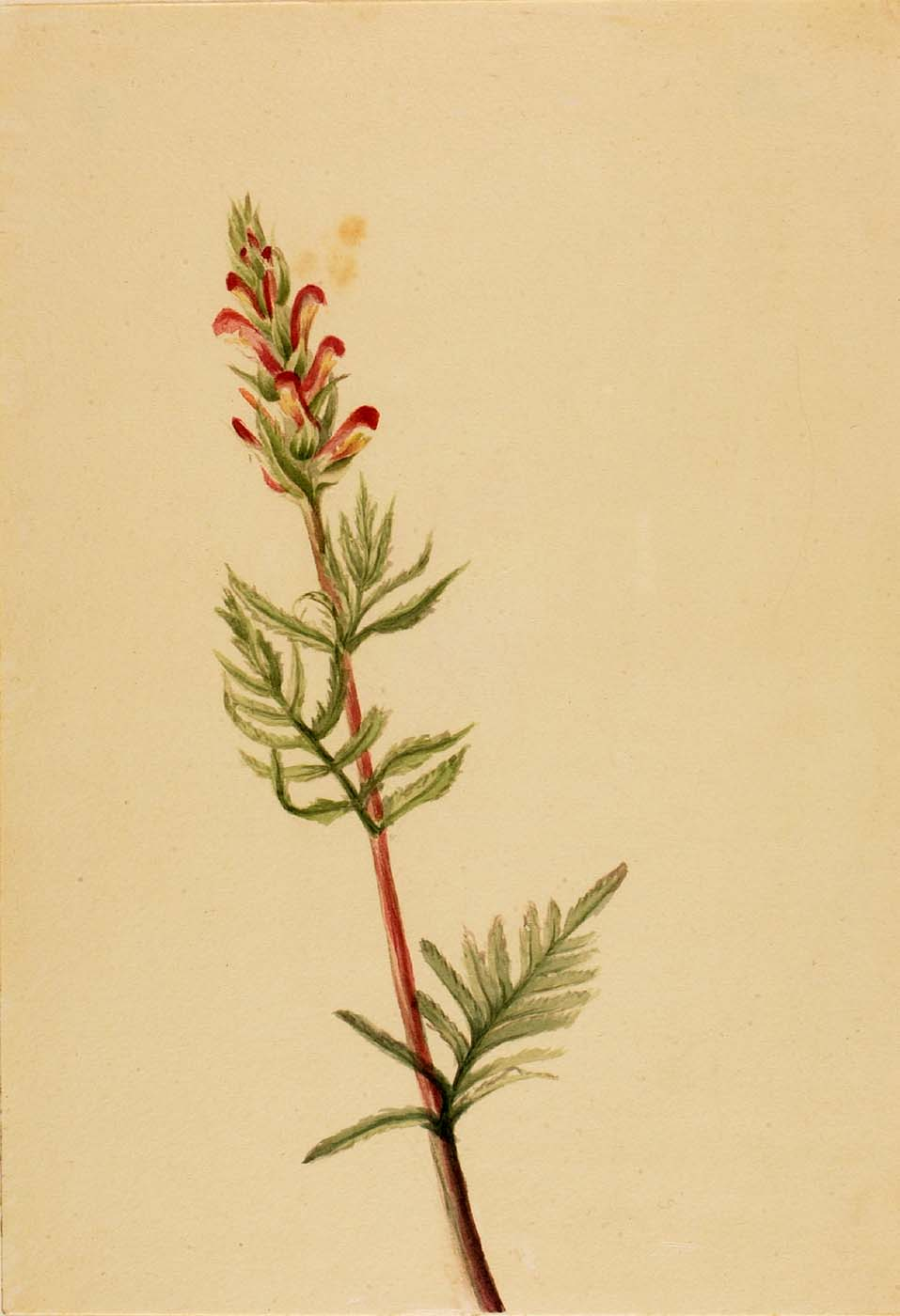
Mary Vaux Walcott, c.1917
