= List of Pedicularis species =

The following is a list of all 679 species in the plant genus Pedicularis which are accepted by Plants of the World Online as of 17 June 2024.

== A ==
- Pedicularis abrotanifolia M.Bieb. ex Steven
- Pedicularis acaulis Scop.
- Pedicularis achilleifolia Stephan ex Willd.
- Pedicularis acmodonta Boiss.
- Pedicularis adunca M.Bieb. ex Steven
- Pedicularis × affinis Steininger
- Pedicularis afghanica Wendelbo
- Pedicularis alaica A.D.Li
- Pedicularis alaschanica Maxim.
- Pedicularis alatavica Stadlm. ex Vved.
- Pedicularis alberti Regel
- Pedicularis albida Pennell
- Pedicularis albiflora (Hook.f.) Prain
- Pedicularis allorrhampha Vved.
- Pedicularis aloensis Hand.-Mazz.
- Pedicularis alopecuroides Steven ex Spreng.
- Pedicularis alopecuros Franch. ex Maxim.
- Pedicularis × alpicola Rouy & Faure
- Pedicularis altaica Stephan ex Steven
- Pedicularis altifrontalis P.C.Tsoong
- Pedicularis amoena Adams ex Steven
- Pedicularis amoeniflora Vved.
- Pedicularis amplicollis T.Yamaz.
- Pedicularis amplituba H.L.Li
- Pedicularis anas Maxim.
- Pedicularis angularis P.C.Tsoong
- Pedicularis angustifolia Benth.
- Pedicularis angustilabris H.L.Li
- Pedicularis angustiloba P.C.Tsoong
- Pedicularis annapurnensis T.Yamaz.
- Pedicularis anomala P.C.Tsoong & H.P.Yang
- Pedicularis anserantha T.Yamaz.
- Pedicularis anthemifolia Fisch. ex Colla
- Pedicularis apodochila Maxim.
- Pedicularis aquilina Bonati
- Pedicularis × aranensis I.Soriano
- Pedicularis arctoeuropaea (Hultén) Molau & D.F.Murray
- Pedicularis armata Maxim.
- Pedicularis artiae R.Kr.Singh, Kholia & Sudhakar
- Pedicularis artselaeri Maxim.
- Pedicularis ascendens Schleich. ex Gaudin
- Pedicularis aschistorrhyncha C.Marquand & Airy Shaw
- Pedicularis asparagoides Lapeyr.
- Pedicularis asplenifolia Flörke ex Willd.
- Pedicularis atra Bonati
- Pedicularis atropurpurea Nordm.
- Pedicularis × atrorubens Schleich. ex Gaudin
- Pedicularis atroviridis P.C.Tsoong
- Pedicularis attollens A.Gray
- Pedicularis atuntsiensis Bonati
- Pedicularis aurantiaca (E.F.Sprague) Monfils & Prather
- Pedicularis aurata (Bonati) H.L.Li
- Pedicularis axillaris Franch. ex Maxim.

== B ==
- Pedicularis balkharica E.A.Busch
- Pedicularis bambusetorum Hand.-Mazz.
- Pedicularis batangensis Bureau & Franch.
- Pedicularis baumgartenii Simonk.
- Pedicularis bella Hook.f.
- Pedicularis × bernardinensis Braun-Blanq.
- Pedicularis bhutanomuscoides T.Yamaz.
- Pedicularis × bicknellii Sommier
- Pedicularis bicolor Diels
- Pedicularis bicornuta Klotzsch
- Pedicularis bidentata Maxim.
- Pedicularis bietii Franch.
- Pedicularis bifida (Buch.-Ham. ex D.Don) Pennell
- Pedicularis binaria Maxim.
- Pedicularis bipinnatifida (Pennell) R.R.Mill
- Pedicularis birmanica Bonati
- Pedicularis bomiensis H.P.Yang
- Pedicularis × bonatii Faure
- Pedicularis brachychila H.L.Li
- Pedicularis brachycrania H.L.Li
- Pedicularis brachyodonta Schloss. & Vuk.
- Pedicularis brachystachys Bunge
- Pedicularis bracteosa Benth.
- Pedicularis breviflora Regel
- Pedicularis brevifolia D.Don
- Pedicularis brevilabris Franch.
- Pedicularis brevirostris Pennell
- Pedicularis breviscaposa T.Yamaz.

== C ==
- Pedicularis cabulica Benth.
- Pedicularis cacuminidenta T.Yamaz.
- Pedicularis cadmea Boiss.
- Pedicularis caeruleoalbescens Wendelbo
- Pedicularis canadensis L.
- Pedicularis canescens P.C.Tsoong
- Pedicularis capitata Adams
- Pedicularis caucasica M.Bieb.
- Pedicularis cenisia Gaudin
- Pedicularis centranthera A.Gray
- Pedicularis cephalantha Franch. ex Maxim.
- Pedicularis cephalanthoides P.C.Tsoong
- Pedicularis cernua Bonati
- Pedicularis chamissonis Steven
- Pedicularis chamissonoides T.Yamaz.
- Pedicularis cheilanthifolia Schrenk
- Pedicularis chengxianensis Z.G.Ma & Z.Z.Ma
- Pedicularis chenocephala Diels
- Pedicularis chihuahuensis G.L.Nesom
- Pedicularis chinensis Maxim.
- Pedicularis chingii Bonati
- Pedicularis cholashanensis T.Yamaz.
- Pedicularis chorgonica Regel & C.Winkl.
- Pedicularis chroorrhyncha Vved.
- Pedicularis chumbica Prain
- Pedicularis cinerascens Franch.
- Pedicularis clarkei Hook.f.
- Pedicularis collata Prain
- Pedicularis collettii Prain
- Pedicularis columigera T.Yamaz.
- Pedicularis comosa L.
- Pedicularis compacta Stephan ex Willd.
- Pedicularis comptoniifolia Franch. ex Maxim.
- Pedicularis condensata M.Bieb.
- Pedicularis confertiflora Prain
- Pedicularis confluens P.C.Tsoong
- Pedicularis conifera Maxim. ex Hemsl.
- Pedicularis connata H.L.Li
- Pedicularis contorta Benth.
- Pedicularis cooperi P.C.Tsoong
- Pedicularis cornigera T.Yamaz.
- Pedicularis corydaloides Hand.-Mazz.
- Pedicularis corymbifera H.P.Yang
- Pedicularis cranolopha Maxim.
- Pedicularis craspedotricha Maxim.
- Pedicularis crassirostris Bunge
- Pedicularis crenata Maxim.
- Pedicularis crenularis H.L.Li
- Pedicularis crenulata Benth.
- Pedicularis cristatella Pennell & H.L.Li
- Pedicularis croizatiana H.L.Li
- Pedicularis cryptantha C.Marquand & Airy Shaw
- Pedicularis curvipes Hook.f.
- Pedicularis curvituba Maxim.
- Pedicularis cyathophylla Franch.
- Pedicularis cyathophylloides H.Limpr.
- Pedicularis cyclorhyncha H.L.Li
- Pedicularis cymbalaria Bonati
- Pedicularis cyrtorhyncha Pennell
- Pedicularis cystopteridifolia Rydb.
- Pedicularis czuiliensis Semiotr.

== D ==
- Pedicularis daghestanica Bonati
- Pedicularis daltonii Prain
- Pedicularis daochengensis H.P.Yang
- Pedicularis dasyantha Hadač
- Pedicularis dasystachys Schrenk
- Pedicularis daucifolia Bonati
- Pedicularis davidii Franch.
- Pedicularis debilis Franch. ex Maxim.
- Pedicularis decora Franch.
- Pedicularis decorissima Diels
- Pedicularis delavayi Franch. ex Maxim.
- Pedicularis × delphinata Steininger
- Pedicularis deltoidea Franch. ex Maxim.
- Pedicularis densiflora Benth.
- Pedicularis densispica Franch. ex Maxim.
- Pedicularis denudata Hook.f.
- Pedicularis deqinensis H.P.Yang
- Pedicularis dhurensis R.R.Mill
- Pedicularis dichotoma Bonati
- Pedicularis dichrocephala Hand.-Mazz.
- Pedicularis dielsiana Bonati
- Pedicularis diffusa Prain
- Pedicularis dissecta (Bonati) Pennell & H.L.Li
- Pedicularis dissectifolia H.L.Li
- Pedicularis dolichantha Bonati
- Pedicularis dolichocymba Hand.-Mazz.
- Pedicularis dolichoglossa H.L.Li
- Pedicularis dolichorrhiza Schrenk
- Pedicularis dolichostachya H.L.Li
- Pedicularis domzeyensis P.C.Tsoong
- Pedicularis dubia B.Fedtsch.
- Pedicularis duclouxii Bonati
- Pedicularis dudleyi Elmer
- Pedicularis dulongensis H.P.Yang
- Pedicularis dunniana Bonati

== E ==
- Pedicularis eburnata B.L.Rob. & Seaton
- Pedicularis elata Willd.
- Pedicularis elegans Ten.
- Pedicularis elephantiflora T.Yamaz.
- Pedicularis elephantoides Benth.
- Pedicularis elephas Boiss.
- Pedicularis elisabethae T.N.Popova
- Pedicularis elliotii P.C.Tsoong
- Pedicularis elongata A.Kern.
- Pedicularis elsholtzioides T.Yamaz.
- Pedicularis elwesii Hook.f.
- Pedicularis eriantha (Boiss. & Buhse) T.N.Popova
- Pedicularis eriophora Turcz.
- Pedicularis ernesti-mayeri Stevan., Niketić & D.Lakušić
- Pedicularis evrardii Bonati
- Pedicularis excelsa Hook.f.
- Pedicularis exigua H.L.Li

== F ==
- Pedicularis fargesii Franch.
- Pedicularis fastigiata Franch.
- Pedicularis × faurei Rouy
- Pedicularis fengii H.L.Li
- Pedicularis ferdinandi Bornm.
- Pedicularis fetisowii Regel
- Pedicularis filicifolia Hemsl.
- Pedicularis filicula Franch.
- Pedicularis filiculiformis P.C.Tsoong
- Pedicularis fissa Turcz.
- Pedicularis flaccida Prain
- Pedicularis flagellaris Benth.
- Pedicularis flammea L.
- Pedicularis flava Pall.
- Pedicularis fletcheri P.C.Tsoong
- Pedicularis flexosoides T.Yamaz.
- Pedicularis flexuosa Hook.f.
- Pedicularis floribunda Franch.
- Pedicularis foliosa L.
- Pedicularis forrestiana Bonati
- Pedicularis fragarioides P.C.Tsoong
- Pedicularis fragilis Prain ex Maxim.
- Pedicularis franchetiana Maxim.
- Pedicularis friderici-augusti Tomm.
- Pedicularis furbishiae S.Watson
- Pedicularis furfuracea Wall. ex Benth.

== G ==
- Pedicularis gagnepainiana Bonati
- Pedicularis galeata Bonati
- Pedicularis gammieana Prain
- Pedicularis ganpinensis Vaniot ex Bonati
- Pedicularis garckeana Prain ex Maxim.
- Pedicularis geniculata T.Yamaz.
- Pedicularis geosiphon Harry Sm. & C.H.Tsoong
- Pedicularis gibbera Prain
- Pedicularis × gillotana Rouy & Faure
- Pedicularis giraldiana Bonati
- Pedicularis glabra McVaugh & Mellich.
- Pedicularis glabrescens H.L.Li
- Pedicularis × glantschnigiana Ronniger
- Pedicularis globifera Hook.f.
- Pedicularis gloriosa Bisset & S.Moore
- Pedicularis gongshanensis H.P.Yang
- Pedicularis gordonii McVaugh & Koptur
- Pedicularis gracilicaulis H.L.Li
- Pedicularis gracilis Wall. ex Benth.
- Pedicularis gracilituba H.L.Li
- Pedicularis graeca Bunge
- Pedicularis grigorjevii Ivanina
- Pedicularis griniformis T.Yamaz.
- Pedicularis groenlandica Retz.
- Pedicularis gruiflora T.Yamaz.
- Pedicularis gruina Franch. ex Maxim.
- Pedicularis gyirongensis H.P.Yang
- Pedicularis gymnostachya (Trautv.) Khokhr.
- Pedicularis gypsicola Vved.
- Pedicularis gyroflexa Vill.
- Pedicularis gyrorhyncha Franch. ex Maxim.

== H ==
- Pedicularis habachanensis Bonati
- Pedicularis hacquetii Graf
- Pedicularis hemsleyana Prain
- Pedicularis henryi Maxim.
- Pedicularis heterodonta Pančić
- Pedicularis heydei Prain
- Pedicularis hicksii P.C.Tsoong
- Pedicularis hintonii McVaugh & Mellich.
- Pedicularis hirsuta L.
- Pedicularis hirtella Franch.
- Pedicularis hoermanniana K.Malý
- Pedicularis hoffmeisteri Klotzsch
- Pedicularis holocalyx Hand.-Mazz.
- Pedicularis honanensis P.C.Tsoong
- Pedicularis hongii Kottaim.
- Pedicularis hookeriana Wall. ex Benn.
- Pedicularis howellii A.Gray
- Pedicularis humilis Bonati
- Pedicularis husainiana P.Agnihotri, D.Husain, D.Sahoo & S.K.Barik
- Pedicularis × huteri A.Kern.
- Pedicularis hyperborea Vved.
- Pedicularis hypophylla T.Yamaz.

== I ==
- Pedicularis ikomae Sasaki
- Pedicularis imbricata P.C.Tsoong
- Pedicularis inaequilobata P.C.Tsoong
- Pedicularis incarnata L.
- Pedicularis × incarnatoides Steininger
- Pedicularis incisopetala E.Menzel, H.Menzel & Zoller
- Pedicularis inconspicua P.C.Tsoong
- Pedicularis incurva Benth.
- Pedicularis infirma H.L.Li
- Pedicularis inflexirostris F.S.Yang, D.Y.Hong & Xiao Q.Wang
- Pedicularis ingens Maxim.
- Pedicularis insignis Bonati
- Pedicularis instar Prain ex Maxim.
- Pedicularis integrifolia Hook.f.
- Pedicularis interrupta Stephan ex Willd.
- Pedicularis ishidoyana Koidz. & Ohwi
- Pedicularis iwatensis Ohwi

== J ==
- Pedicularis julica E.Mayer
- Pedicularis junatovii Ivanina

== K ==
- Pedicularis kangtingensis P.C.Tsoong
- Pedicularis kansuensis Maxim.
- Pedicularis karakorumiana T.Yamaz.
- Pedicularis karatavica Pavlov
- Pedicularis kariensis Bonati
- Pedicularis karoi Freyn
- Pedicularis kashmiriana Pennell
- Pedicularis kaufmannii Pinzger
- Pedicularis kawaguchii T.Yamaz.
- Pedicularis keiskei Franch. & Sav.
- Pedicularis kerneri Dalla Torre
- Pedicularis khasiana (Hook.f.) Pennell
- Pedicularis kialensis Franch.
- Pedicularis kiangsiensis P.C.Tsoong & S.H.Cheng
- Pedicularis kingii Prain
- Pedicularis klotzschii Hurus.
- Pedicularis koidzumiana Tatew. & Ohwi
- Pedicularis kokpakensis Semiotr.
- Pedicularis kolymensis A.P.Khokhr.
- Pedicularis kongboensis P.C.Tsoong
- Pedicularis korolkowii Regel
- Pedicularis koshiensis T.Yamaz.
- Pedicularis koueytchensis Bonati
- Pedicularis krylowii Bonati
- Pedicularis kuljabensis Ivanina
- Pedicularis kungeica Bajtenov
- Pedicularis kuruchuensis T.Yamaz.
- Pedicularis kusnetzovii Kom.

== L ==
- Pedicularis labordei Vaniot ex Bonati
- Pedicularis labradorica Wirsing
- Pedicularis lachnoglossa Hook.f.
- Pedicularis laktangensis Bonati
- Pedicularis lamioides Hand.-Mazz.
- Pedicularis lanata Cham. & Schltdl.
- Pedicularis lanceifolia P.C.Tsoong
- Pedicularis lanceolata Michx.
- Pedicularis langsdorffii Fisch. ex Steven
- Pedicularis lanpingensis H.P.Yang
- Pedicularis lapponica L.
- Pedicularis lasiophrys Maxim.
- Pedicularis lasiostachys Bunge
- Pedicularis latibracteata T.Yamaz.
- Pedicularis latirostris P.C.Tsoong
- Pedicularis latituba Bonati
- Pedicularis laxiflora Franch.
- Pedicularis laxispica H.L.Li
- Pedicularis lecomtei Bonati
- Pedicularis legendrei Bonati
- Pedicularis leptosiphon H.L.Li
- Pedicularis leucodon Griseb.
- Pedicularis lhasana T.Yamaz.
- Pedicularis liguliflora T.Yamaz.
- Pedicularis likiangensis Franch. ex Maxim.
- Pedicularis limithangensis T.Yamaz.
- Pedicularis limnogena A.Kern.
- Pedicularis limprichtiana Hand.-Mazz.
- Pedicularis lineata Franch.
- Pedicularis lingelsheimiana H.Limpr.
- Pedicularis lobatorostrata T.Yamaz.
- Pedicularis longicalyx H.P.Yang
- Pedicularis longicaulis Franch.
- Pedicularis longiflora Rudolph
- Pedicularis longipedicellata P.C.Tsoong
- Pedicularis longipes Maxim.
- Pedicularis longipetiolata Franch.
- Pedicularis longistipitata P.C.Tsoong
- Pedicularis lophotricha H.L.Li
- Pedicularis ludlowiana P.C.Tsoong
- Pedicularis ludwigii Regel
- Pedicularis lunglingensis Bonati
- Pedicularis lutescens Franch.
- Pedicularis lyrata Prain ex Maxim.

== M ==
- Pedicularis macilenta Franch.
- Pedicularis macrochila Vved.
- Pedicularis macrorhyncha H.L.Li
- Pedicularis macrosiphon Franch.
- Pedicularis mairei Bonati
- Pedicularis mandshurica Maxim.
- Pedicularis mariae Regel
- Pedicularis × martellii Bonati
- Pedicularis masalskyi Semiotr.
- Pedicularis × mathoneti Bonati ex Rouy
- Pedicularis maximowiczii Krasn.
- Pedicularis maxonii Bonati
- Pedicularis mayana Hand.-Mazz.
- Pedicularis × mayeri Daksk. & Vreš
- Pedicularis megalantha D.Don
- Pedicularis megalochila H.L.Li
- Pedicularis melalimne R.R.Mill
- Pedicularis melampyriflora Franch.
- Pedicularis membranacea H.L.Li
- Pedicularis merrilliana H.L.Li
- Pedicularis metaszetschuanica P.C.Tsoong
- Pedicularis meteororhyncha H.L.Li
- Pedicularis mexicana Zucc. ex Benth.
- Pedicularis micrantha H.L.Li
- Pedicularis microcalyx Hook.f.
- Pedicularis microchila Franch.
- Pedicularis microloba R.R.Mill
- Pedicularis milliana W.B.Yu, D.Z.Li & H.Wang
- Pedicularis milosevicii Křivka & Holubec
- Pedicularis minima P.C.Tsoong & S.H.Cheng
- Pedicularis minutilabris P.C.Tsoong
- Pedicularis mixta Gren.
- Pedicularis mollis Wall. ex Benth.
- Pedicularis monbeigiana Bonati
- Pedicularis × monnieri Rouy
- Pedicularis moschata Maxim.
- Pedicularis moupinensis Franch.
- Pedicularis mucronulata P.C.Tsoong
- Pedicularis muguensis T.Yamaz.
- Pedicularis multicaulis Bonati
- Pedicularis multicolor W.Jun Li, K.Y.Guan, Abduraimov & Y.Feng
- Pedicularis multiflora Pennell
- Pedicularis munzurdaghensis Armağan
- Pedicularis murreeana R.R.Mill
- Pedicularis muscicola Maxim.
- Pedicularis muscoides H.L.Li
- Pedicularis mussotii Franch.
- Pedicularis mustanghatana T.Yamaz.
- Pedicularis mychophila C.Marquand & Airy Shaw
- Pedicularis myriantha H.L.Li
- Pedicularis myriophylla Pall.

== N ==
- Pedicularis nana C.E.C.Fisch.
- Pedicularis nanchuanensis P.C.Tsoong
- Pedicularis nanfutashanensis T.Yamaz.
- Pedicularis nasturtiifolia Franch.
- Pedicularis nasuta M.Bieb. ex Steven
- Pedicularis neofischeri P.C.Tsoong
- Pedicularis nepalensis Prain
- Pedicularis nigra (Bonati) Vaniot ex Bonati
- Pedicularis ningjuingensis T.Yamaz.
- Pedicularis nipponica Makino
- Pedicularis nobilis Bonati
- Pedicularis nodosa Pennell
- Pedicularis nordmanniana Bunge
- Pedicularis novaiae-zemliae (Hultén) Kozhevn.
- Pedicularis numeniicephala T.Yamaz.
- Pedicularis numidica Pomel
- Pedicularis nyalamensis H.P.Yang
- Pedicularis nyingchiensis H.P.Yang & Tateishi

== O ==
- Pedicularis obliquigaleata W.B.Yu & H.Wang
- Pedicularis obscura Bonati
- Pedicularis ochiaiana Makino
- Pedicularis ochotensis A.P.Khokhr.
- Pedicularis ochrorrhyncha Galushko & T.N.Popova
- Pedicularis odontochila Diels
- Pedicularis odontocorys T.Yamaz.
- Pedicularis odontoloma T.Yamaz.
- Pedicularis odontophora Prain
- Pedicularis oederi Vahl
- Pedicularis olgae Regel
- Pedicularis oligantha Franch. ex Maxim.
- Pedicularis oliveriana Prain
- Pedicularis olympica Boiss.
- Pedicularis omiiana Bonati
- Pedicularis ophiocephala Maxim.
- Pedicularis orizabae Schltdl. & Cham.
- Pedicularis ornithorhynchos Benth.
- Pedicularis orthantha Griseb.
- Pedicularis orthocoryne H.L.Li
- Pedicularis oxycarpa Franch. ex Maxim.
- Pedicularis oxyrhyncha T.Yamaz.

== P ==
- Pedicularis pacifica (Hultén) Kozhevn.
- Pedicularis paiana H.L.Li
- Pedicularis pallasii Vved.
- Pedicularis × pallidiflora I.Soriano
- Pedicularis palustris L.
- Pedicularis pandania W.B.Yu, H.Q.Lin & Yue H.Cheng
- Pedicularis panjutinii E.A.Busch
- Pedicularis pantlingii Prain
- Pedicularis paradoxa (Prain) T.Yamaz.
- Pedicularis parryi A.Gray
- Pedicularis parviflora Sm.
- Pedicularis pauciflora (Prain ex Maxim.) Pennell
- Pedicularis paxiana H.Limpr.
- Pedicularis pectinata Wall. ex Benth.
- Pedicularis pectinatiformis Bonati
- Pedicularis pennellii Hultén
- Pedicularis pentagona H.L.Li
- Pedicularis perpusilla P.C.Tsoong
- Pedicularis perrottetii Benth.
- Pedicularis petelotii P.C.Tsoong
- Pedicularis petiolaris Ten.
- Pedicularis petitmenginii Bonati
- Pedicularis petrophila H.L.Li
- Pedicularis phaceliifolia Franch.
- Pedicularis pheulpinii Bonati
- Pedicularis physocalyx Bunge
- Pedicularis pilosocalycina Charit.
- Pedicularis pilostachya Maxim.
- Pedicularis pinetorum Hand.-Mazz.
- Pedicularis platychila P.C.Tsoong
- Pedicularis platyrhyncha Schrenk
- Pedicularis plicata Maxim.
- Pedicularis poluninii P.C.Tsoong
- Pedicularis polygaloides Hook.f.
- Pedicularis polyodonta H.L.Li
- Pedicularis pontica Boiss.
- Pedicularis popovii Vved.
- Pedicularis porrecta Wall. ex Benth.
- Pedicularis porriginosa P.C.Tsoong
- Pedicularis portenschlagii Saut. ex Rchb.
- Pedicularis potaninii Maxim.
- Pedicularis praeruptorum Bonati
- Pedicularis praetermissa (I.Soriano, M.Bernal & Sánchez-Cux.) Aymerich & L.Sáez
- Pedicularis prainiana Maxim.
- Pedicularis princeps Franch.
- Pedicularis proboscidea Steven
- Pedicularis procera A.Gray
- Pedicularis przewalskii Maxim.
- Pedicularis × pseudoasplenifolia Steininger
- Pedicularis pseudoatra Bonati
- Pedicularis pseudocephalantha Bonati
- Pedicularis pseudocurvituba P.C.Tsoong
- Pedicularis pseudoheydei P.C.Tsoong
- Pedicularis pseudohookeriana T.Yamaz.
- Pedicularis pseudoingens Bonati
- Pedicularis pseudomelampyriflora Bonati
- Pedicularis pseudomuscicola Bonati
- Pedicularis pseudoregeliana P.C.Tsoong
- Pedicularis pseudosteiningeri Bonati
- Pedicularis pseudoversicolor Hand.-Mazz.
- Pedicularis pteridifolia Bonati
- Pedicularis pubiflora Vved.
- Pedicularis pulchella Pennell
- Pedicularis pulchra Paulsen
- Pedicularis punctata Decne.
- Pedicularis purpurea Pennell
- Pedicularis pushpangadanii T.Husain & Arti Garg
- Pedicularis pycnantha Boiss.
- Pedicularis pygmaea Maxim.
- Pedicularis pyramidata Royle ex Benth.
- Pedicularis pyrenaica J.Gay
- Pedicularis qinghaiensis T.Yamaz.

== Q ==
- Pedicularis quxiangensis H.P.Yang

== R ==
- Pedicularis racemosa Douglas ex Benth.
- Pedicularis raghvendrae Arti Garg & R.Kr.Singh
- Pedicularis rainierensis Pennell & F.A.Warren
- Pedicularis ramosissima Bonati
- Pedicularis rechingeri Wendelbo
- Pedicularis recurva Maxim.
- Pedicularis recutita L.
- Pedicularis refracta (Maxim.) Maxim.
- Pedicularis regeliana Prain
- Pedicularis remotiloba Hand.-Mazz.
- Pedicularis reptans P.C.Tsoong
- Pedicularis resupinata L.
- Pedicularis retingensis P.C.Tsoong
- Pedicularis revealiana Arti Garg
- Pedicularis rex C.B.Clarke ex Maxim.
- Pedicularis reynieri Bonati
- Pedicularis rhinanthoides Schrenk ex Fisch. & C.A.Mey.
- Pedicularis rhizomatosa P.C.Tsoong
- Pedicularis rhodotricha Maxim.
- Pedicularis rhynchodonta Bureau & Franch.
- Pedicularis rhynchotricha P.C.Tsoong
- Pedicularis rigginsiae D.J.Keil
- Pedicularis rigida Franch. ex Maxim.
- Pedicularis rigidescens T.Yamaz.
- Pedicularis rigidiformis Bonati
- Pedicularis rizhaoensis H.P.Yang
- Pedicularis roborowskii Maxim.
- Pedicularis robusta Hook.f.
- Pedicularis rohtangensis Aswal, Goel & Mehrotra
- Pedicularis rosea Wulfen
- Pedicularis roseialba T.Yamaz.
- Pedicularis rostratocapitata Crantz
- Pedicularis rostratospicata Crantz
- Pedicularis rotundifolia C.E.C.Fisch.
- Pedicularis × rouyana F.O.Wolf ex Rouy
- Pedicularis roylei Maxim.
- Pedicularis rubens Stephan ex Willd.
- Pedicularis rudis Maxim.
- Pedicularis ruoergaiensis H.P.Yang
- Pedicularis rupicola Franch.

== S ==
- Pedicularis × sagalaevii V.V.Byalt & Firsov
- Pedicularis salicifolia Bonati
- Pedicularis salviiflora Franch.
- Pedicularis sanguilimbata R.R.Mill
- Pedicularis sarawschanica Regel
- Pedicularis sceptrum-carolinum L.
- Pedicularis schistostegia Vved.
- Pedicularis schizocalyx (Lange) Steininger
- Pedicularis schizorrhyncha Prain
- Pedicularis schugnana B.Fedtsch.
- Pedicularis scolopax Maxim.
- Pedicularis scopulorum A.Gray
- Pedicularis scullyana Prain ex Maxim.
- Pedicularis semenowii Regel
- Pedicularis semibarbata A.Gray
- Pedicularis semitorta Maxim.
- Pedicularis shansiensis P.C.Tsoong
- Pedicularis sherriffii P.C.Tsoong
- Pedicularis siamensis P.C.Tsoong
- Pedicularis sibirica Vved.
- Pedicularis sibthorpii Boiss.
- Pedicularis sigmoidea Franch.
- Pedicularis sikkimensis Bonati
- Pedicularis sima Maxim.
- Pedicularis siphonantha D.Don
- Pedicularis smithiana Bonati
- Pedicularis songarica Schrenk ex Fisch. & C.A.Mey.
- Pedicularis sorbifolia P.C.Tsoong
- Pedicularis souliei Franch.
- Pedicularis sphaerantha P.C.Tsoong
- Pedicularis spicata Pall.
- Pedicularis stadlmanniana Bonati
- Pedicularis staintonii R.R.Mill
- Pedicularis steiningeri Bonati
- Pedicularis stenantha Franch.
- Pedicularis stenophylla H.L.Li
- Pedicularis stenotheca P.C.Tsoong
- Pedicularis stewartii Pennell
- Pedicularis straussii Hausskn.
- Pedicularis streptorhyncha P.C.Tsoong
- Pedicularis striata Pall.
- Pedicularis strobilacea Franch.
- Pedicularis stylosa H.P.Yang
- Pedicularis subrostrata C.A.Mey.
- Pedicularis subulatidens P.C.Tsoong
- Pedicularis sudetica Willd.
- Pedicularis sunkosiana T.Yamaz.
- Pedicularis superba Franch. ex Maxim.
- Pedicularis svenhedinii Paulsen
- Pedicularis sylvatica L.
- Pedicularis szetschuanica Maxim.

== T ==
- Pedicularis tachanensis Bonati
- Pedicularis tahaiensis Bonati
- Pedicularis takpoensis P.C.Tsoong
- Pedicularis talassica Vved.
- Pedicularis taliensis Bonati
- Pedicularis tamurensis T.Yamaz.
- Pedicularis tantalorhyncha Franch. ex Bonati
- Pedicularis tantalorhynchoides P.C.Tsoong
- Pedicularis tapaoensis P.C.Tsoong
- Pedicularis tatarinowii Maxim.
- Pedicularis tatianae Bordz.
- Pedicularis tatsienensis Bureau & Franch.
- Pedicularis tayloriana P.C.Tsoong
- Pedicularis tenacifolia P.C.Tsoong
- Pedicularis tenera H.L.Li
- Pedicularis tenuicaulis Prain
- Pedicularis tenuirostris Benth.
- Pedicularis tenuisecta Franch. ex Maxim.
- Pedicularis tenuituba Pennell & H.L.Li
- Pedicularis ternata Maxim.
- Pedicularis terrenoflora T.Yamaz.
- Pedicularis thailandica T.Yamaz.
- Pedicularis thamnophila (Hand.-Mazz.) H.L.Li
- Pedicularis tianschanica Rupr.
- Pedicularis tibetica Franch.
- Pedicularis tomentosa H.L.Li
- Pedicularis tongolensis Franch.
- Pedicularis torta Maxim.
- Pedicularis transversa Baimukhambetova
- Pedicularis triangularidens P.C.Tsoong
- Pedicularis trichocymba H.L.Li
- Pedicularis trichodonta T.Yamaz.
- Pedicularis trichoglossa Hook.f.
- Pedicularis trichomata H.L.Li
- Pedicularis tricolor Hand.-Mazz.
- Pedicularis tripinnata M.Martens & Galeotti
- Pedicularis tristis L.
- Pedicularis tsaii H.L.Li
- Pedicularis tsangchanensis Franch. ex Maxim.
- Pedicularis tsarungensis H.L.Li
- Pedicularis tsekouensis Bonati
- Pedicularis tsiangii H.L.Li
- Pedicularis tuberosa L.

== U ==
- Pedicularis uliginosa Bunge
- Pedicularis umbelliformis H.L.Li
- Pedicularis uralensis Vved.
- Pedicularis urceolata P.C.Tsoong

== V ==
- Pedicularis vagans Hemsl.
- Pedicularis variegata H.L.Li
- Pedicularis venusta Schangin ex Bunge
- Pedicularis verae Vved.
- Pedicularis verbenifolia Franch. ex Maxim.
- Pedicularis × verlotii Arv.-Touv.
- Pedicularis veronicifolia Franch.
- Pedicularis verticillata L.
- Pedicularis vialii Franch.
- Pedicularis villosa Ledeb. ex Spreng.
- Pedicularis violascens Schrenk
- Pedicularis × vulpii Solms

== W ==
- Pedicularis waldheimii Bonati
- Pedicularis wallichii Bunge
- Pedicularis wanghongiae M.L.Liu & W.B.Yu
- Pedicularis wardii Bonati
- Pedicularis weixiensis H.P.Yang
- Pedicularis × wettsteiniana Bonati
- Pedicularis wilhelmsiana Fisch. ex M.Bieb.
- Pedicularis wilsonii Bonati
- Pedicularis wlassowiana Steven
- Pedicularis woodii R.R.Mill

== X ==
- Pedicularis xiangchengensis H.P.Yang
- Pedicularis xiqingshanensis H.Y.Feng & J.Z.Sun
- Pedicularis xylopoda P.C.Tsoong
- Pedicularis yalungensis T.Yamaz.

== Y ==
- Pedicularis yamazakiana R.R.Mill
- Pedicularis yanyuanensis H.P.Yang
- Pedicularis yaoshanensis H.Wang
- Pedicularis yarilaica R.R.Mill
- Pedicularis yezoensis Maxim.
- Pedicularis yinshanensis (Z.Y.Chu & Y.Z.Zhao) Y.Zhao
- Pedicularis yui H.L.Li

== Z ==
- Pedicularis yunnanensis Franch. ex Maxim.
- Pedicularis zayuensis H.P.Yang
- Pedicularis zeylanica Benth.
- Pedicularis zhongdianensis H.P.Yang
