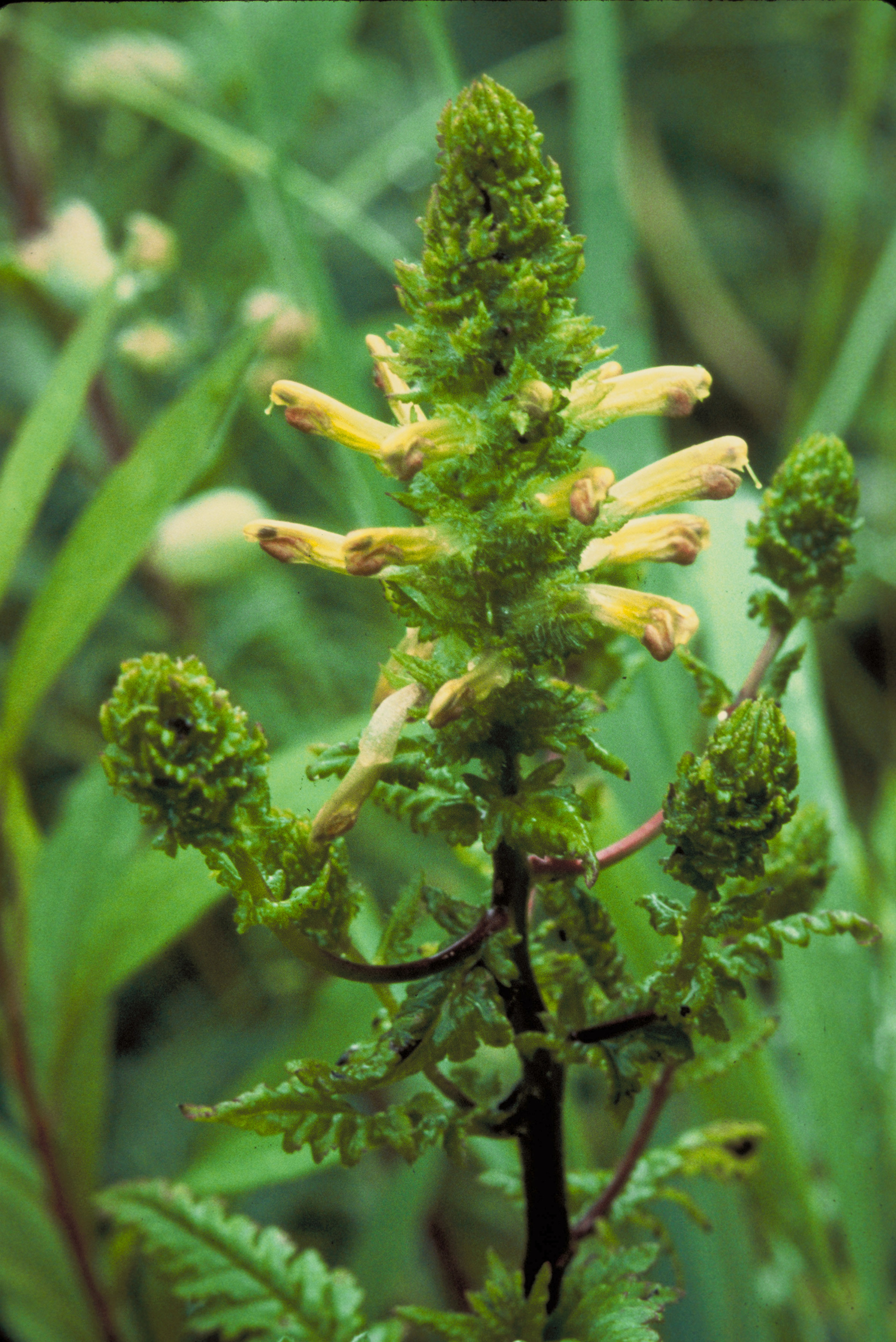

Conservation status
- Endangered (IUCN 3.1)

- Critically Imperiled (NatureServe)

Scientific classification
- Kingdom: Plantae
- Clade: Embryophytes
- Clade: Tracheophytes
- Clade: Angiosperms
- Clade: Eudicots
- Clade: Asterids
- Order: Lamiales
- Family: Orobanchaceae
- Genus: Pedicularis
- Species: P. furbishiae

Binomial name
- Pedicularis furbishiae S.Watson

= Pedicularis furbishiae =

Species of flowering plant

Pedicularis furbishiae, or Furbish's lousewort, is a perennial herb found only on the shores of the upper Saint John River in Maine and New Brunswick. Furbish's lousewort was first recognized as a new species by Maine naturalist and botanical artist Kate Furbish (who named it Furbish's wood betony) in 1880. It is considered an endangered species in the United States and Canada, and is threatened by habitat destruction, as well as riverside development, forestry, littering and recreational use of the riverbank. It was formerly in the family Scrophulariaceae, but is now placed in the family Orobanchaceae. Once thought to be extinct, it is considered a Lazarus taxon.

== Description ==
Furbish's lousewort is not distinguished by large and showy flowers. The Nature Trust of New Brunswick says it "averages 75 cm in height. During its first few years of growth, it forms a basal rosette of deeply incised fern like leaves. Usually after three years the lousewort begins to flower, often from a single, slightly hairy and reddish tinged stem with a few branches near the top. Furbish's lousewort flowers are small, yellow and snap-dragon like. They are clustered in a short cylindrical head, and open sequentially from the lower to the upper-most between July and August."

== Distribution and habitat ==
Furbish's lousewort grows on the bank of the Saint John River in three areas of New Brunswick and at 18 sites in Maine. It needs moist, unstable, semi-shaded, eroding banks subject to flooding, and ice-scouring. In this way, it is typical of an entire group of shoreline species (e.g. Sabatia kennedyana, Platanthera flava) that grow in wet meadows created by spring flooding and ice scour, combined with summer low water periods. Its range extends 225 km (140 mi) from "the town of Andover, New Brunswick ... upstream to a point 2.4 km (1.5 mi) past the confluence with the Big Black River in Aroostook County, Maine". Despite only being found in a limited range today, previous records show it was found throughout the Aroostook River, but recent surveys have found no such populations.

== Conservation ==
Because it is endangered and endemic to the area, development projects have been restricted to preserve its habitat. For example, the Dickey-Lincoln dam, a $227 million hydroelectric project proposed on the upper Saint John River in 1974, was deauthorized by Congress in 1986 after years of study, because the dam would have flooded 88,000 acres (360 km^{2}) of Maine forest and severely reduced the lousewort's habitat. Some criticized ending the dam project to protect the lousewort; Time magazine called the idea "downright silly" in 1977. While thought extinct at the time the dam was proposed, it was rediscovered in 1976 by C.D. Richards while doing surveys to determine the environmental impact of the dam. It was later discovered in the Saint John River Valley in New Brunswick by Dr. George Stirrett and Frederick Wallace Tribe, prompting the Canadian government to recognize its endangered status in 1980. In recognition of their efforts, both Stirrett and Tribe were awarded Stewardship Awards from the province of New Brunswick. Additionally, the George M. Stirrett Nature Preserve was established in 1992, and a prominent road in Perth-Andover was named F. Tribe Road.
