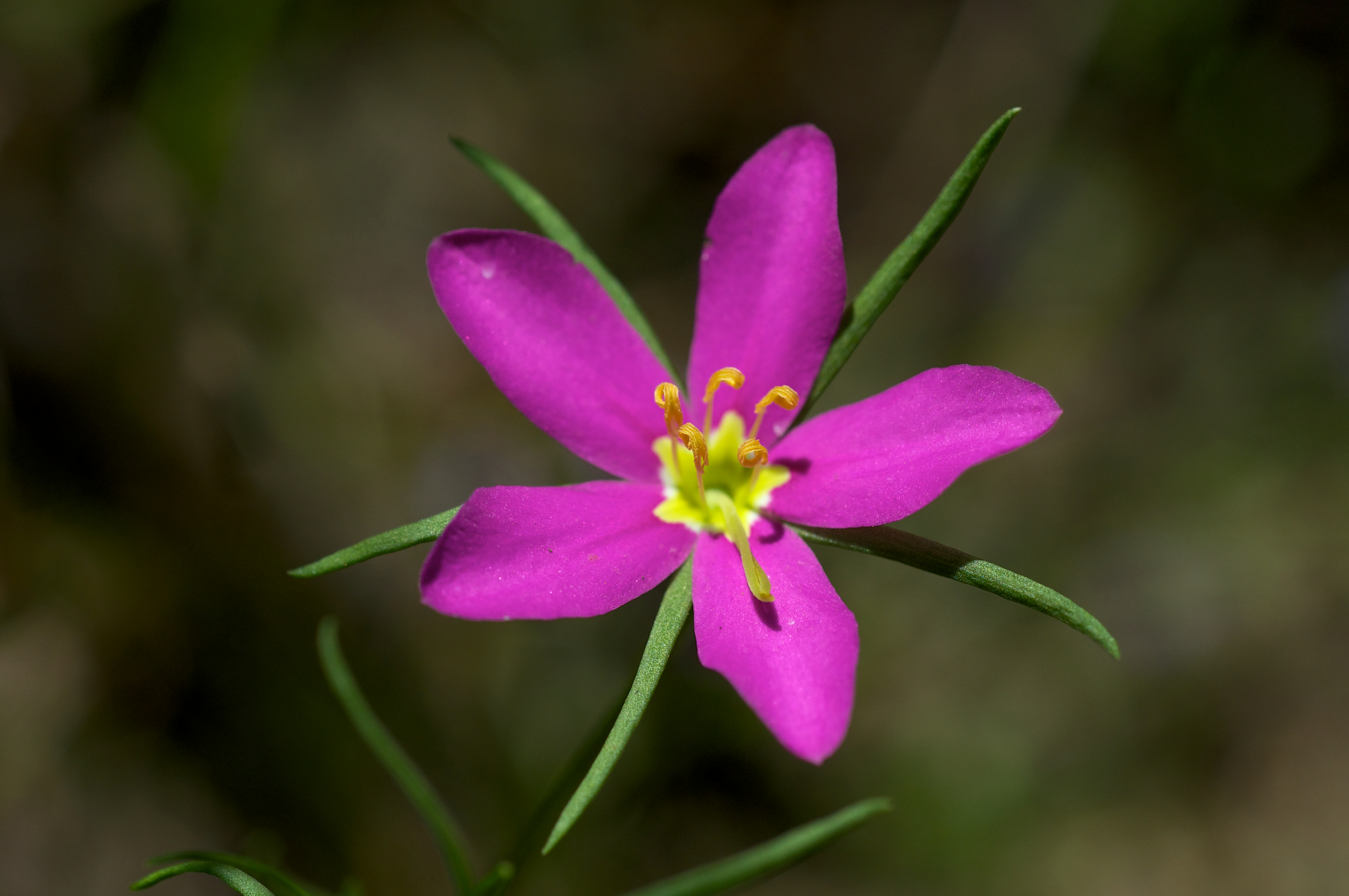

Conservation status
- Critically Imperiled (NatureServe)

Scientific classification
- Kingdom: Plantae
- Clade: Tracheophytes
- Clade: Angiosperms
- Clade: Eudicots
- Clade: Asterids
- Order: Gentianales
- Family: Gentianaceae
- Genus: Sabatia
- Species: S. arkansana

Binomial name
- Sabatia arkansana J.S.Pringle & C.T.Witsell

= Sabatia arkansana =

Pelton's rose gentian

Species of flowering plant

Sabatia arkansana, commonly known as Pelton's rose gentian, is an herbaceous annual in the gentian family. It was discovered in 2001 in several glades of the Ouachita Mountains in Saline County, Arkansas by John Pelton, a retired mechanic turned amateur photographer and naturalist. It is known only from two locations in this county and is considered critically imperiled as a result of the presence of nearby housing developments and due to the absence of a fire regime. In summer it shows attractive rose-purple flowers.

== Description ==
It is an annual plant growing to about 12 cm tall. The leaves are produced in opposite pairs, lanceolate, 5–15 mm long and 2–3 mm broad. The flowers are about 3.5 cm diameter, with a five-lobed corolla, purplish-pink with a pale yellow center, and five yellow stamens. The fruit is a capsule about 1 cm long.

== Similar species ==
It is similar to and often occurs together with the related Sabatia campestris. Pelton's rose gentian differs from it in its smaller size, darker pink flowers with rounded corolla lobes and in growing on moister sites.

== Taxonomy ==
John Pelton, an amateur nature photographer and naturalist, discovered Sabatia arkansana in 2001 northwest of the town of Owensville. Initially unaware of his discovery, he showed the plant to Theo Witsell, a botany student who was involved with the Flora of Arkansas Project, in hopes of properly identifying it. He collected specimens of it and Sabatia campestris, which was also found growing at the same site. All the consulted literature seemed to suggest that both were S. campestris, but the differences between the two were clear.

While surveying populations of the rare pipewort Eriocaulon koernickianum in similar habitats near the town of Bauxite, John Pringle, a botanist from the Royal Botanical Gardens in Ontario, and Witsell discovered another population of Pelton's rose gentian. After Witsell had compared his specimens with a range of specimens of S. campestris at the Missouri Botanical Gardens and had confirmed that they were not the same, the plants were sent to Pringle who described and named the new species. The authors offered to name the species after Pelton, but he declined. Instead they chose the specific name arkansana due to the plant's endemism in Arkansas. Despite Pelton's refusal to have the specific epithet bear his surname, the authors suggested the common name "Pelton's rose-gentian" in his honour.

== Distribution and habitat ==
Sabatia arkansana is found exclusively in shale and igneous glades that become wet in winter but are dry from summer through fall. Within these unique micro-habitats the plant only exists in confined flat areas along the floodplains of small streams that often dry up during the hotter months of the year. It may also be found in similar conditions near seeping springs. Due to the plant being an annual, the population numbers fluctuate every year. At the first known site, called the Womble Formation site, between 200 and over 1000 individuals were found between 2001 and 2004. The other site showed similar results. Similar habitats in the neighbouring areas of Pulaski County, Garland County and Montgomery County were searched in 2003 and 2004 in hopes of finding other sites, but none were found.
