= George Golding Kennedy =

American botanist (1841–1918)

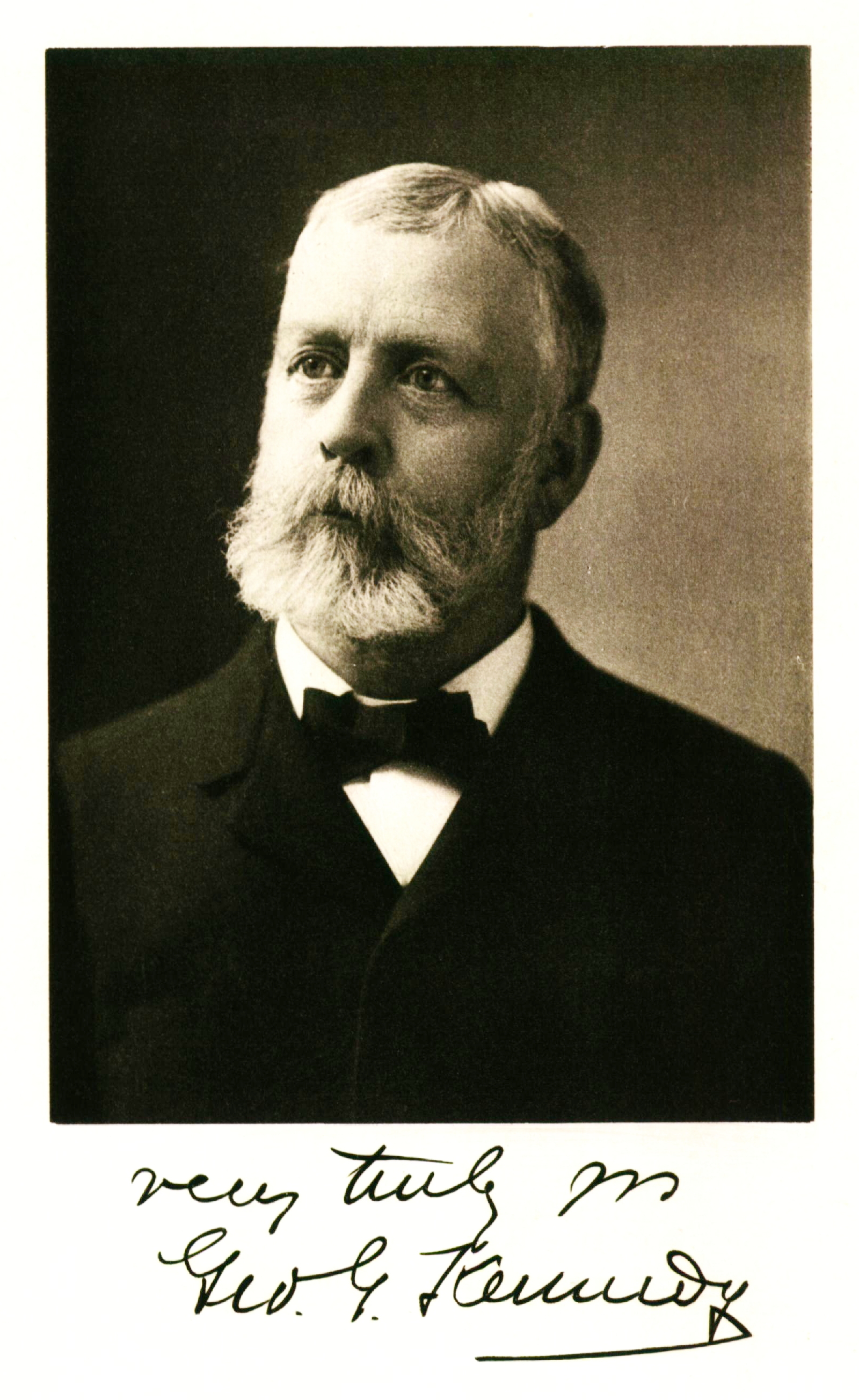

George Golding Kennedy (October 16, 1841 – March 31, 1918) was an American physician and botanist. He took a special interest in the mosses. The plant Sabatia kennedyana was named after him.

Kennedy was born in Roxbury, Boston, to Donald and Ann Golding Kennedy née Colgate. His father had moved from Scotland to Canada and later in 1833 to Boston. He went to the Roxbury Latin School under Augustus H. Buck and in 1860 he enrolled in Harvard College. After receiving an AB in 1864 he went to the Harvard Medical School and received a medical degree in 1867. He practiced briefly but took over his father's estate and business. In 1865 he married Harriet White (d. 1910), daughter of Benjamin Clark Harris.

Kennedy became interested in botany through the classes of Asa Gray and began to make a herbarium collection from around 1862. He collected plants locally and also on trips to Europe, Egypt, and the Middle East. Kennedy purchased the estate of Judges John Oakes Shaw in Milton, Massachusetts, in 1897 and established his new home there. In 1903 he visited his family in Devonshire, Scotland, and also visited Joseph Dalton Hooker. He joined the New England Botanical Club in 1896 and took part in its activities. His herbarium of nearly 13,490 sheets was donated to the Gray Herbarium at Harvard University.
