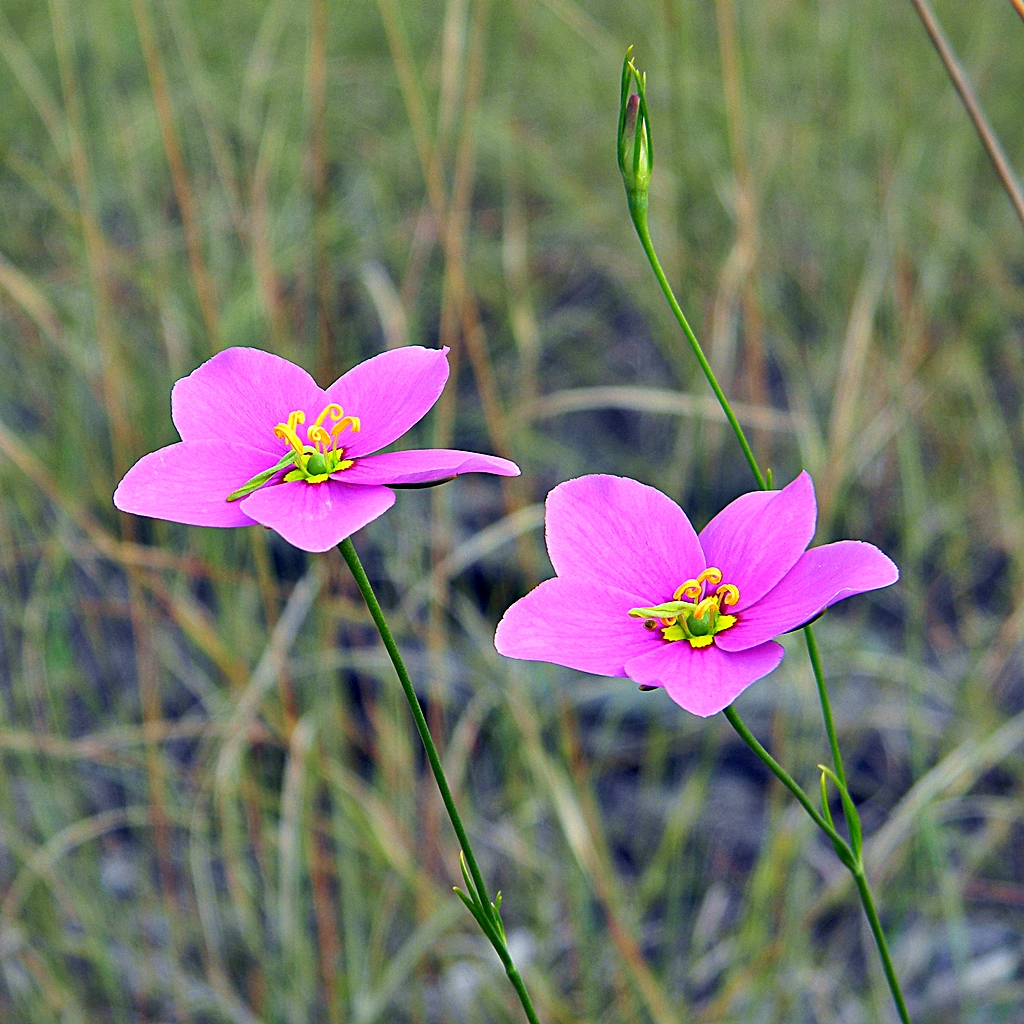
- At Jonathan Dickinson State Park
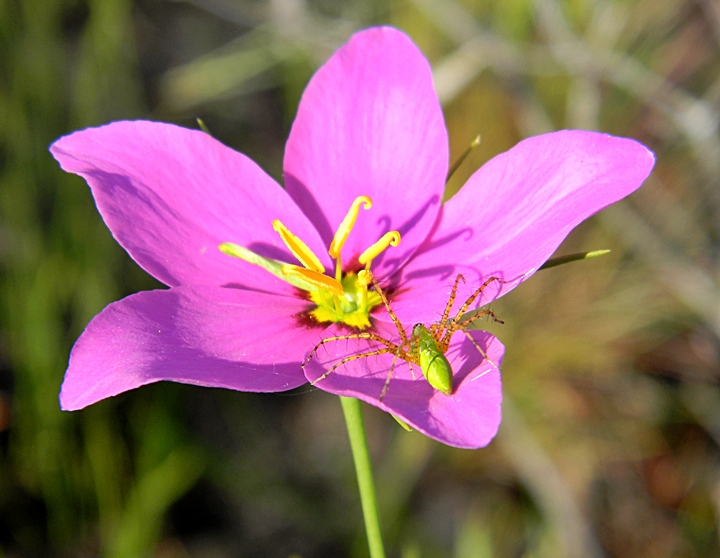
- With a green lynx spider

Conservation status
- Vulnerable (NatureServe)

Scientific classification
- Kingdom: Plantae
- Clade: Tracheophytes
- Clade: Angiosperms
- Clade: Eudicots
- Clade: Asterids
- Order: Gentianales
- Family: Gentianaceae
- Genus: Sabatia
- Species: S. grandiflora

Binomial name
- Sabatia grandiflora (A.Gray) Small

= Sabatia grandiflora =

Species of flowering plant

Sabatia grandiflora is a flowering plant in the genus Sabatia. Commonly known as marsh-pink or largeflower rose gentian, the annual has pink flowers. It grows in parts of Florida and Alabama. The flowers have five pink petals and a yellow center.
