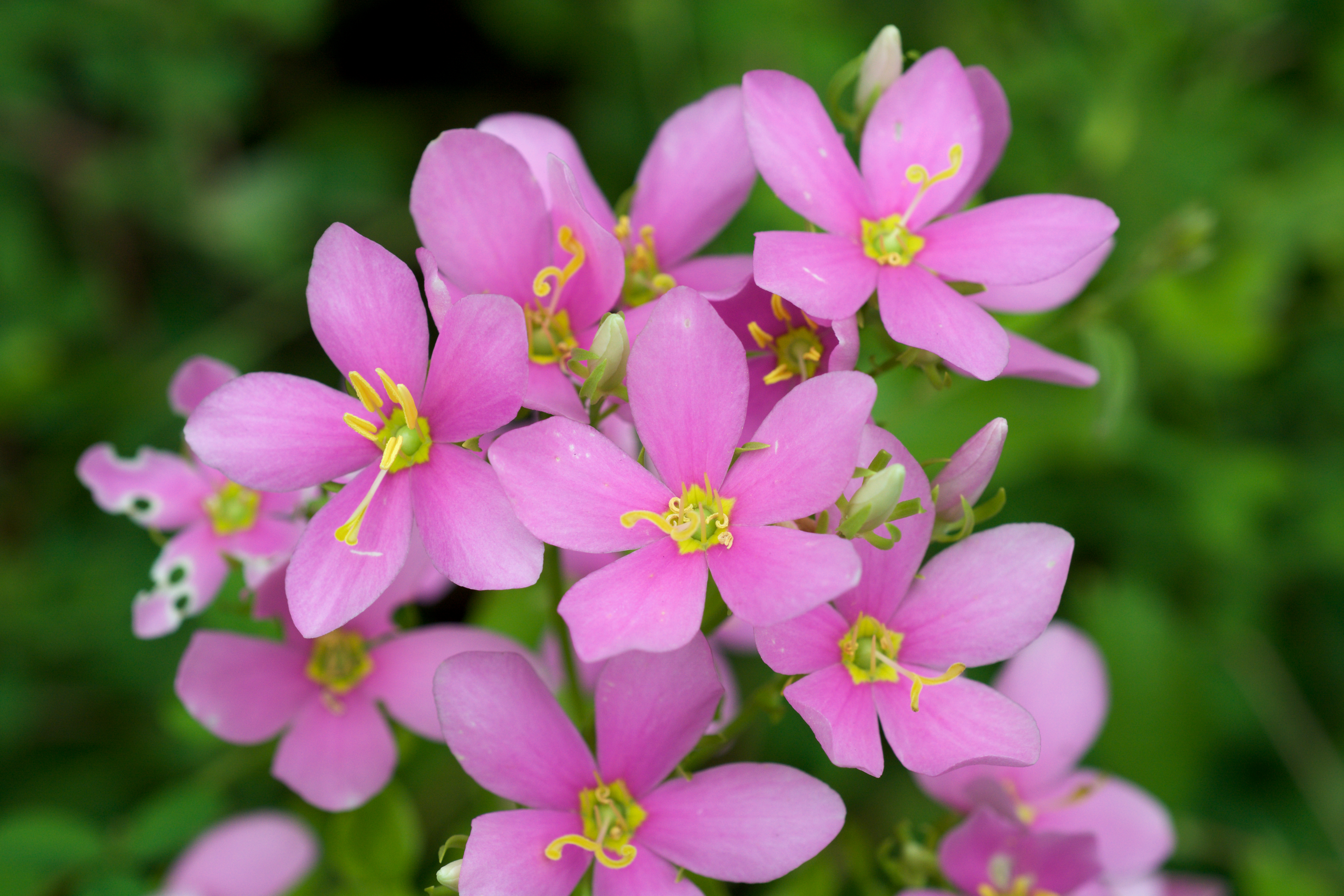

Conservation status
- Secure (NatureServe)

Scientific classification
- Kingdom: Plantae
- Clade: Tracheophytes
- Clade: Angiosperms
- Clade: Eudicots
- Clade: Asterids
- Order: Gentianales
- Family: Gentianaceae
- Genus: Sabatia
- Species: S. angularis

Binomial name
- Sabatia angularis (L.) Pursh

= Sabatia angularis =

Species of plant

Sabatia angularis, commonly called rosepink, rose pink, square-stem rose pink or rose gentian, is a biennial flowering plant in the Gentianaceae (gentain) family. It is native to central and eastern North America.

== Description ==
S. angularis grows 0.8–0.9 metres (2.5–3 ft) tall, although in the first year this biennial plant appears only as a low rosette of leaves. In the second year, one or more stems rise from the basal leaves. The stems are 4-sided, appearing as a square in cross section, and glabrous, with flexible, thin wings on the edges. The lower part of the main stem is unbranched, with branches growing primarily from leaf nodes on the upper part. The leaves are opposite, simple, entire (without teeth), glabrous, ovate to ovate-lanceolate, and measure up to about 3.8 centimetres (1.5 in) long and 2.5 centimetres (1 in) wide.

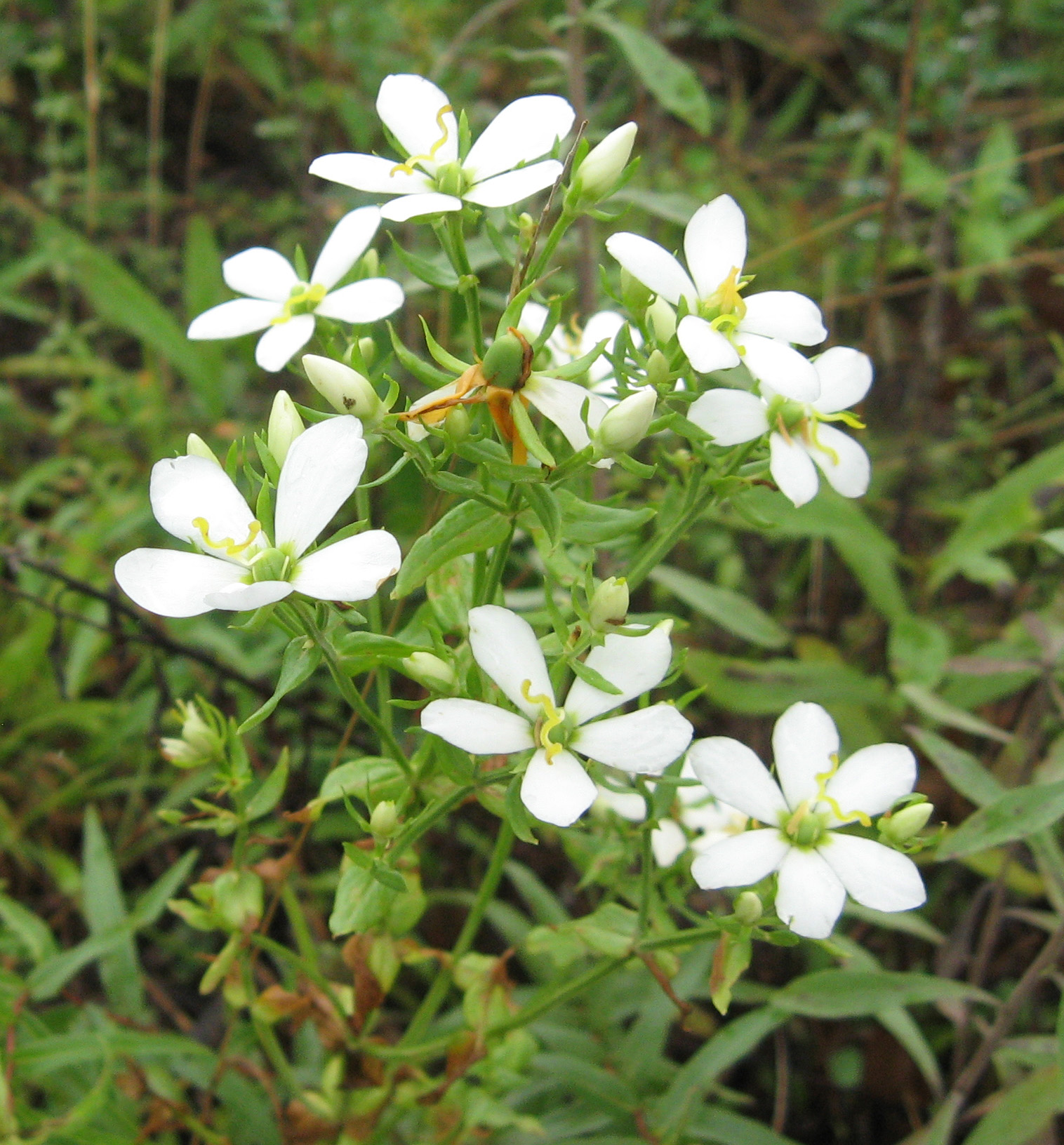
Form albiflora has white flowers.

The plant blooms from June to September with fragrant pink (occasionally white) flowers that are up to 2.5 centimetres (1 in) across. The flowers have 5 petal-like obovate lobes. Yellowish triangular markings on the inner edge of the lobes give the appearance of a star in the middle of the flower. After the flowers fade, the plant produces seed capsules that contain numerous tiny seeds. Seeds are spread by the wind, and the plant will reseed itself.

== Etymology ==
The genus name honors Liberato Sabbati, an 18th-century Italian botanist. The specific epithet is Latin for "angular", referring to the square stems.

== Distribution and habitat ==
It is geographically widespread in the United States, in the southern U.S. from Arizona in the west all the way to the east coast, and in the northern U.S. from Illinois in the west to Massachusetts in the east. It is native to Ontario but it is believed to be extirpated.

S. angularis is found in a variety of habitats, in glades, along roadsides, in fields, and along the margins of woods.

== Ecology ==
Sabatia angularis is insect pollinated and is recorded to have been visited in northern Florida by Lasioglossum reticulatum and Megachile mendica.
