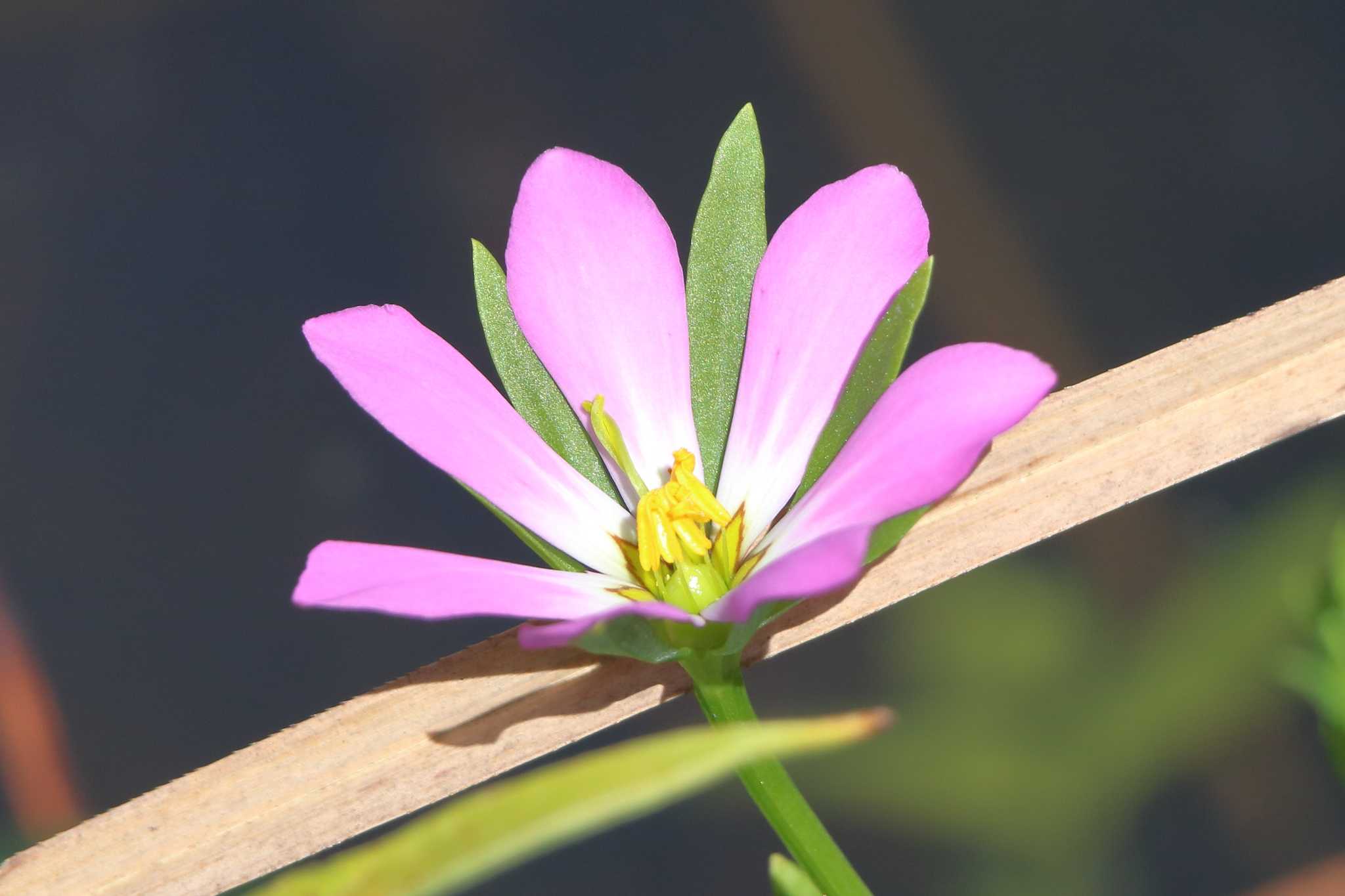
- Flower

Scientific classification
- Kingdom: Plantae
- Clade: Tracheophytes
- Clade: Angiosperms
- Clade: Eudicots
- Clade: Asterids
- Order: Gentianales
- Family: Gentianaceae
- Genus: Sabatia
- Species: S. calycina

Binomial name
- Sabatia calycina (Lam.) A. Heller

Synonyms
- List: Chironia calycosa Michx.; Chironia dichotoma Walter; Dasystephana calycina (Lam.) J.Sojak; Gentiana calycina Lam.; Pleienta fasciculata Raf.; Pleienta quinquenervia Raf.; Sabatia calycosa (Michx.) Pursh; Sabatia calycosa (Michx.) Pursh ex Sims; Sabatia cubensis (Griseb.) Urb.; Sabatia dichotoma (Walter) Trel. ex Branner & Coville; Sabatia gracilis var. cubensis Griseb.

= Sabatia calycina =

Species of flowering plant

Sabatia calycina, commonly known as coastal rose gentian or coastal rose-pink, is a perennial flower native to North America and the Caribbean.

== Description ==
Sabatia calycina varies in height between 8 to 50 cm (3 to 20 in). The leaves are oppositely arranged and elliptic in shape, reaching a length of 2 to 7 cm (0.8 to 2.8 in) and a width of 0.5 to 2.5 cm (0.2 to 1.0 in). Basal leaves are notably absent, but basal offshoots are often present.

When inflorescence occurs it is white to pale pink in color. The corolla lobes are oblanceolate in shape, reaching a length between 7 and 15 mm (0.3 and 0.6 in). The sepals are commonly longer than the lobes. S. calycina blooms from March through November.

== Distribution and habitat ==
Within North America S. calycina may be found in the southeastern coastal plain region, its range stretching from Virginia south to Florida and westwards to Texas. Disjunct populations also exist in western Cuba and the Dominican Republic.

Sabatia calycina is considered by the United States Department of Agriculture to be an obligate wetland species. As such, it can be found in mesic environments such as along river banks and within swamp forests.
