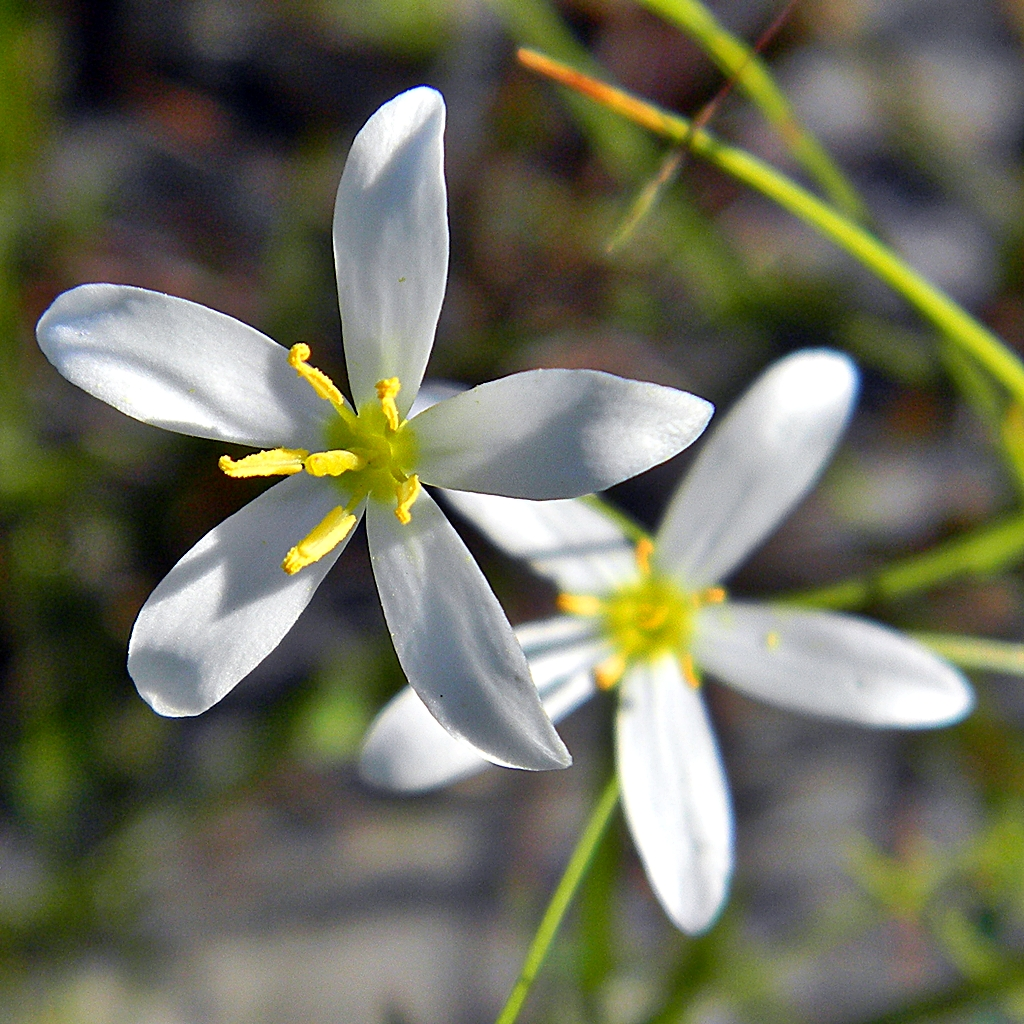

Conservation status
- Vulnerable (NatureServe)

Scientific classification
- Kingdom: Plantae
- Clade: Embryophytes
- Clade: Tracheophytes
- Clade: Angiosperms
- Clade: Eudicots
- Clade: Asterids
- Order: Gentianales
- Family: Gentianaceae
- Genus: Sabatia
- Species: S. brevifolia

Binomial name
- Sabatia brevifolia Raf.

= Sabatia brevifolia =

Species of plant

Sabatia brevifolia, commonly known as shortleaf or short-leaved rose gentian (or rose-gentian), narrowleaf or narrow-leaved sabatia, white marsh-pink or white sabatia, is a species of flowering plant in the genus Sabatia and the family Gentianaceae. It is an annual that grows in moist flatwoods and savannahs. It grows from 1–3 feet tall and the flowers have five white petals with pointed tips.

In the United States it grows in the states of Florida, Georgia, South Carolina, and Alabama.
