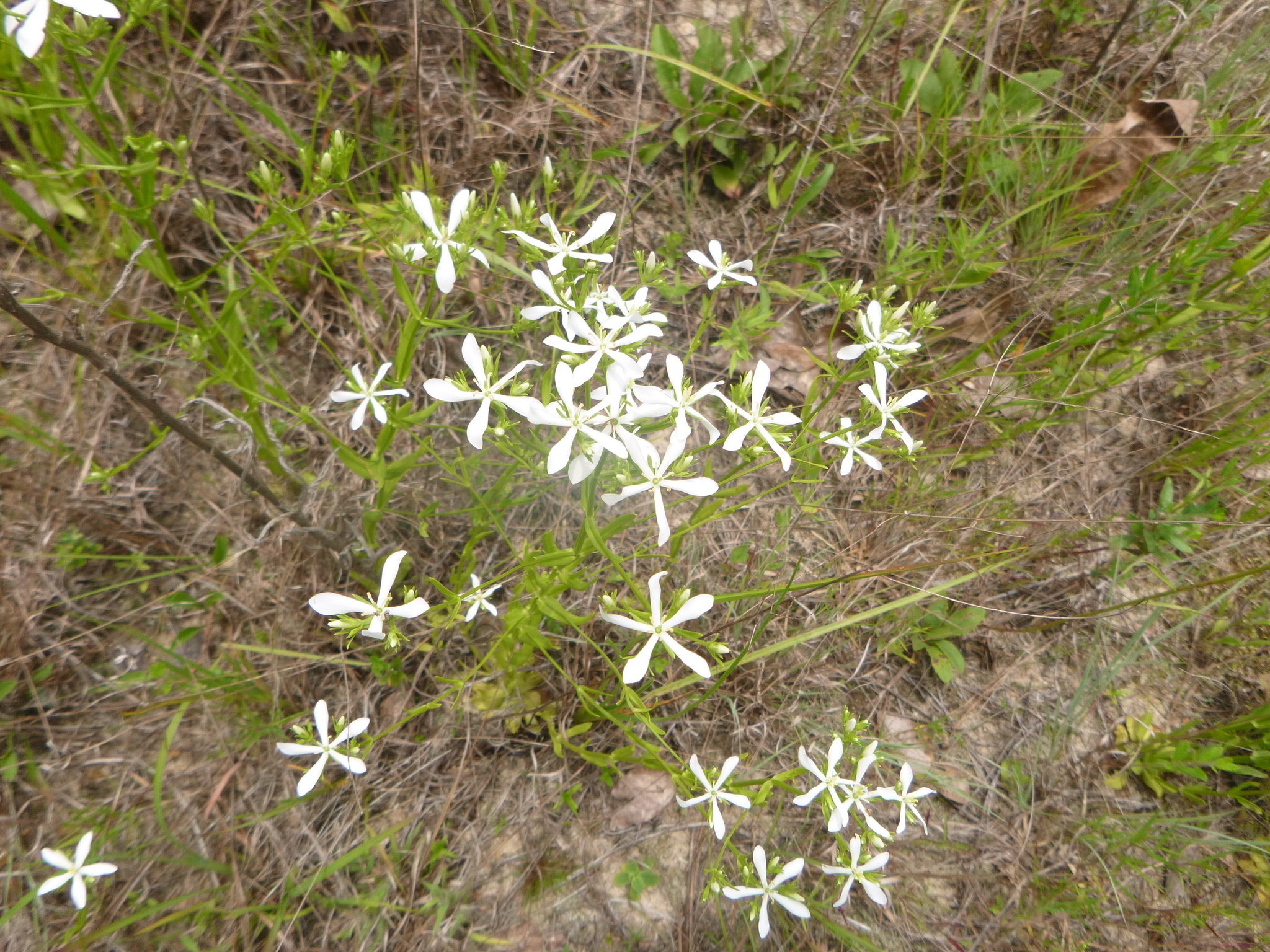
- In Aiken County, South Carolina

Conservation status
- Apparently Secure (NatureServe)

Scientific classification
- Kingdom: Plantae
- Clade: Tracheophytes
- Clade: Angiosperms
- Clade: Eudicots
- Clade: Asterids
- Order: Gentianales
- Family: Gentianaceae
- Genus: Sabatia
- Species: S. quadrangula

Binomial name
- Sabatia quadrangula (Wilbur)

Synonyms
- Sabatia paniculata auct. non (Michx.) Pursh; Sabatia brachiana f. candida (Elliott) Fernald

= Sabatia quadrangula =

Species of plant

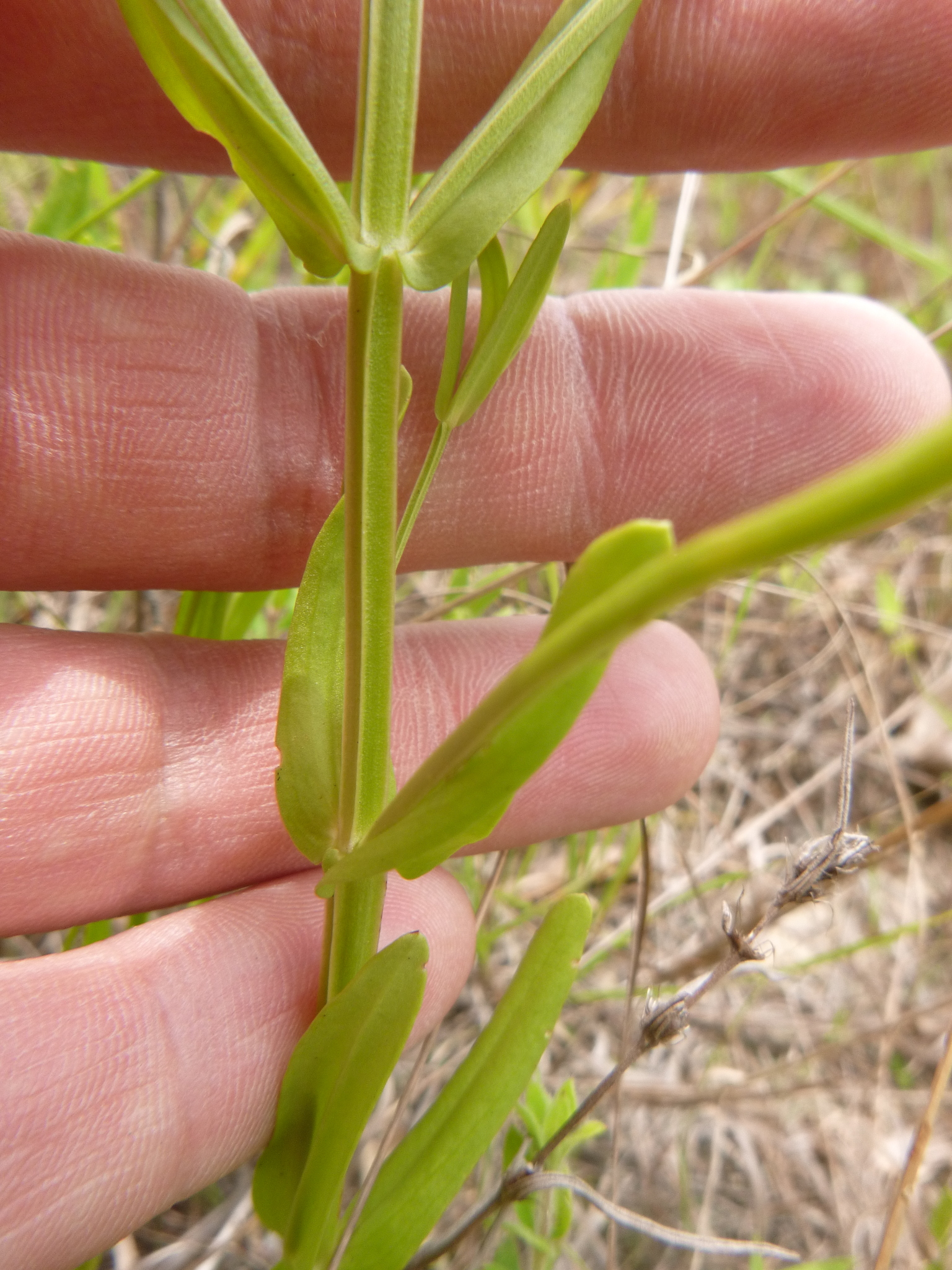
The four-angled stem of Sabatia quandragula

Sabatia quadrangula, the fourangle rose gentian or four-angle rose-gentian, is a flowering plant native to the eastern United States. It is found in pine savannas, flatwoods, shrub bog borders, ditches, and granite outcrops from Virginia south to the Florida panhandle and west to Alabama.
