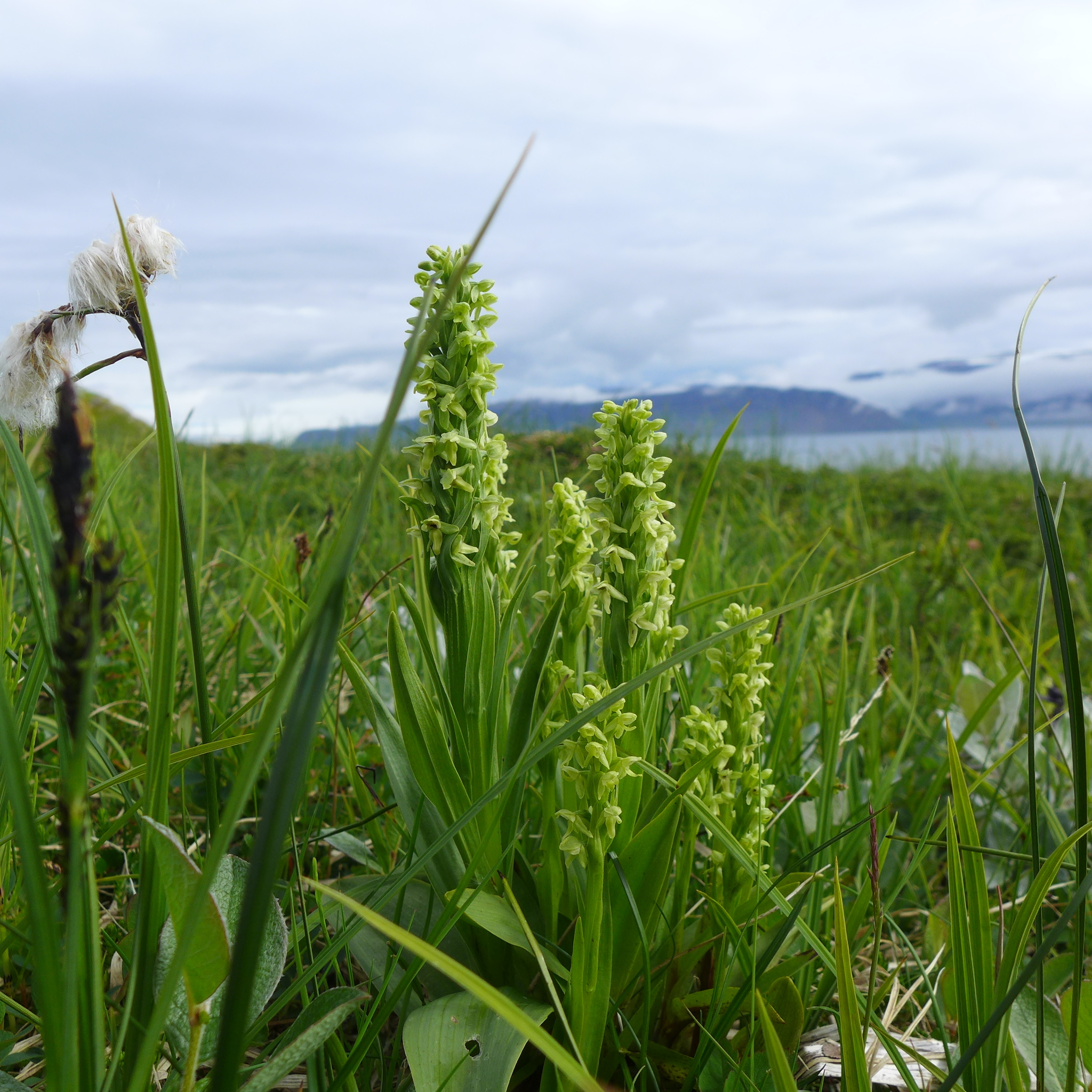

Conservation status
- Secure (NatureServe)

Scientific classification
- Kingdom: Plantae
- Clade: Embryophytes
- Clade: Tracheophytes
- Clade: Spermatophytes
- Clade: Angiosperms
- Clade: Monocots
- Order: Asparagales
- Family: Orchidaceae
- Subfamily: Orchidoideae
- Genus: Platanthera
- Species: P. flava

Binomial name
- Platanthera flava (L.) Lindl.

= Platanthera flava =

Palegreen orchid

Species of flowering plant in the orchid family

Platanthera flava, the southern rein orchid or palegreen orchid, is a species of terrestrial orchid native to eastern North America, from Texas east to Florida, north to Ontario, Quebec and Nova Scotia.

Platanthera flava has from 10 to 40 flowers in an inflorescence. In the north of its range, in Canada, this species is particularly associated with shorelines of lakes and rivers, in the seasonally flooded zone. In Nova Scotia, it occurs in wet meadows on seasonally flooded shorelines with rare shoreline species such as Sabatia kennedyana. In the south, such as in Texas, it is found in wet savannas and flatwoods. The shoreline habitats of the north are maintained by ice scour, while in the south, the flatwoods are maintained by recurring fire. Hence, it appears that this species depends upon recurring natural disturbance to maintain open sunny conditions.

== Varieties ==
Two varieties are recognized:

- Platanthera flava var. flava – southern part of species range
- Platanthera flava var. herbiola (R. Brown) Luer – northern part of species range
