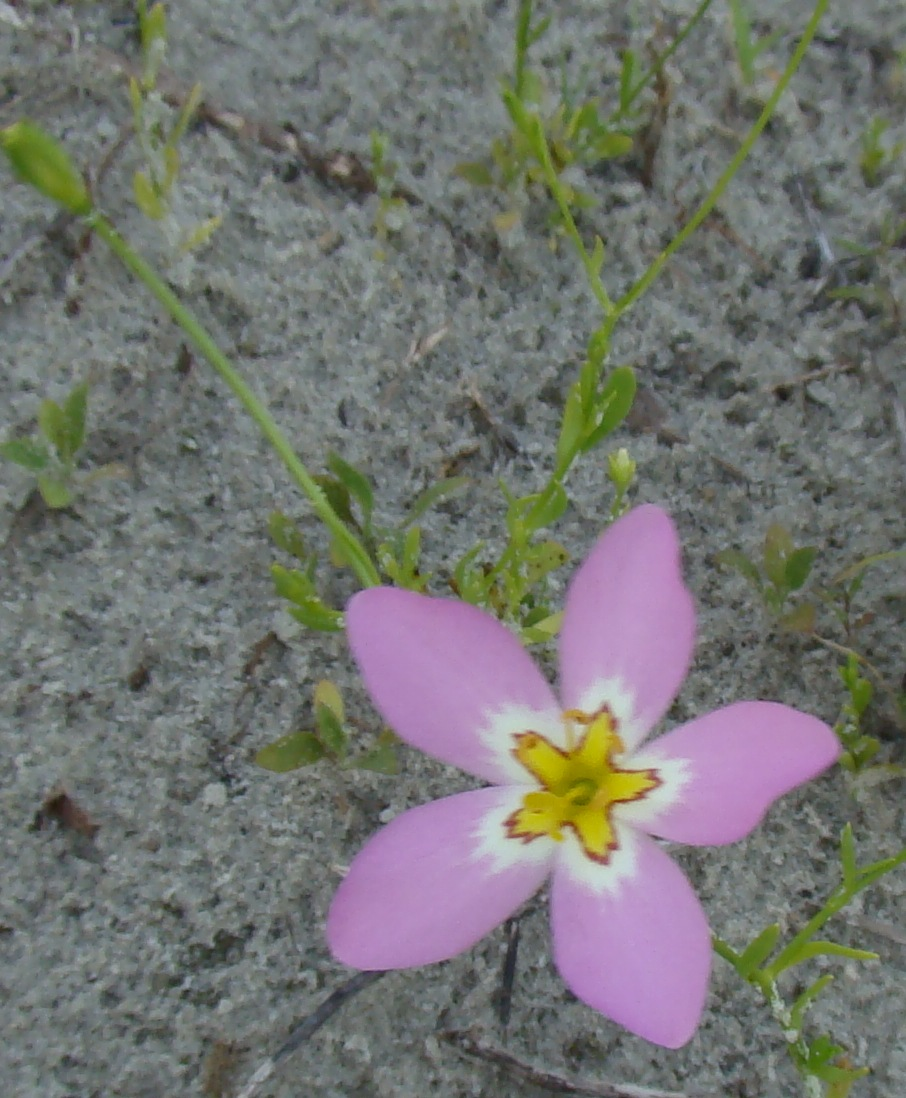
- Marsh pink (Sabatia stellaris) on Fripp Island, South Carolina

Scientific classification
- Kingdom: Plantae
- Clade: Tracheophytes
- Clade: Angiosperms
- Clade: Eudicots
- Clade: Asterids
- Order: Gentianales
- Family: Gentianaceae
- Genus: Sabatia
- Species: S. stellaris

Binomial name
- Sabatia stellaris Pursh

= Sabatia stellaris =

Species of flowering plant

Sabatia stellaris, with the common names rose of Plymouth, marsh pink, salt-marsh pink, and sea-pink; is a species of Sabatia. It has the synonym Sabatia maculata (Benth.) Benth. & Hook.f., Sabatia palmeri Gray, Sabatia purpusii Brandeg., Sabatia simulata Britt.).

== Distribution ==
The plant is endemic to the Eastern United States, where it occurs on the Atlantic and Gulf coasts, from Massachusetts south to Florida and west to Louisiana. It is a halophyte, restricted to salt marsh habitats, where it is threatened by the invasive species Phragmites australis.

== Description ==
Sabatia stellaris is an annual plant growing to 20 cm tall in the northern part of its range, and up to 50 cm tall in the south of the range.

The leaves are arranged in opposite pairs, narrow to broad elliptic in shape, with narrow leaves in Florida, and broad leaves in New England; the change in leaf shape is clinal, and cannot be separated into discrete subspecies or varieties.

The flowers are pink or white, with five or six corolla lobes ('petals'). The fruit is a dry capsule containing up to 600 seeds.

== Conservation ==
Sabatia stellaris is listed as endangered in Massachusetts, Connecticut and New York.
