= Catherine Furbish =

American botanist and scientific illustrator

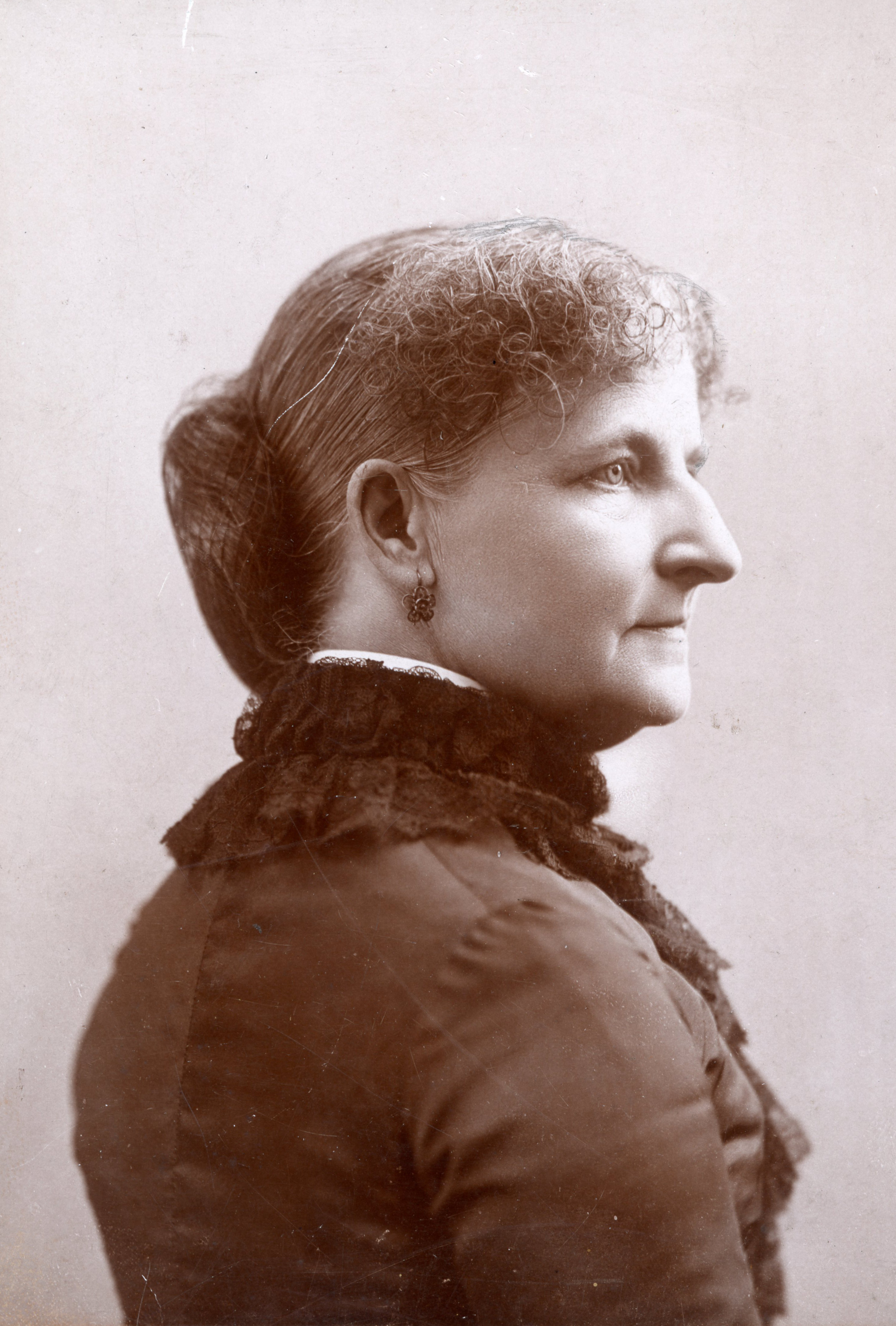
Catherine "Kate" Furbish

Catherine 'Kate' Furbish (May 19, 1834 – December 6, 1931) was an American botanist who collected, classified and illustrated the native flora of Maine. She devoted over 60 years of her life, traveling thousands of miles throughout her home state and creating very accurate drawings and watercolor paintings of the plants she found.

She discovered two plants which were named after her: Pedicularis furbishiae (Furbish lousewort) and Aster cordifolius L., var. furbishiae.

== Early life and education ==
Kate Furbish was born on May 19, 1834, in Exeter, New Hampshire, the eldest child and only daughter of Benjamin and Mary Lane Furbish. The family relocated to Brunswick, Maine, shortly after her birth. As a child, her father would take Furbish and her five younger brothers for walks in the local woods. Even as a young child, Furbish showed a knack for botany as she was able to identify many of the area's native plants.

Furbish pursued a genteel education in painting and French literature. She studied drawing in Portland and Boston. This resulted in her spending one year in Paris to perfect her painting. Though she did not receive a formalized higher education, in 1860, Furbish attended George L. Goodale's botany lectures in Boston.

== Personal life ==
Furbish was an artist, but also a scientist, defying the societal norms of the time. She led the life of a typical Victorian lady in that she dressed appropriately, attended church regularly, and kept her house in immaculate order, but she was often impatient with other social conventions and took refuge in her family. She is described as being very independent. She traveled alone and did not feel the need to get married.

In 1860, Furbish became very ill after a trip to Boston, and spent the next 10 years recovering her fragile health. By 1870, Furbish had regained sufficient strength to resume her walks through the woods in Maine. In 1873, her father died and left her a large enough inheritance so she could pursue her favorite pastime.

Local residents became accustomed to seeing Furbish on her walks. Some people considered her unusual due to her obsession with flora and the outdoors. She was given the nickname "Posey Woman" by the French Canadians living in the wilds of Maine, which stuck with her and which she felt suited her well. When asked why she was so interested in "weeds," Furbish quoted Henry Wadsworth Longfellow, "We feel the presence of God in Nature there, Nature grand and awful, and tread reverently where all is so hushed and oppressive in its silence."

By the end of her life, Furbish had neuralgia, leading to pain in her hands and feet.

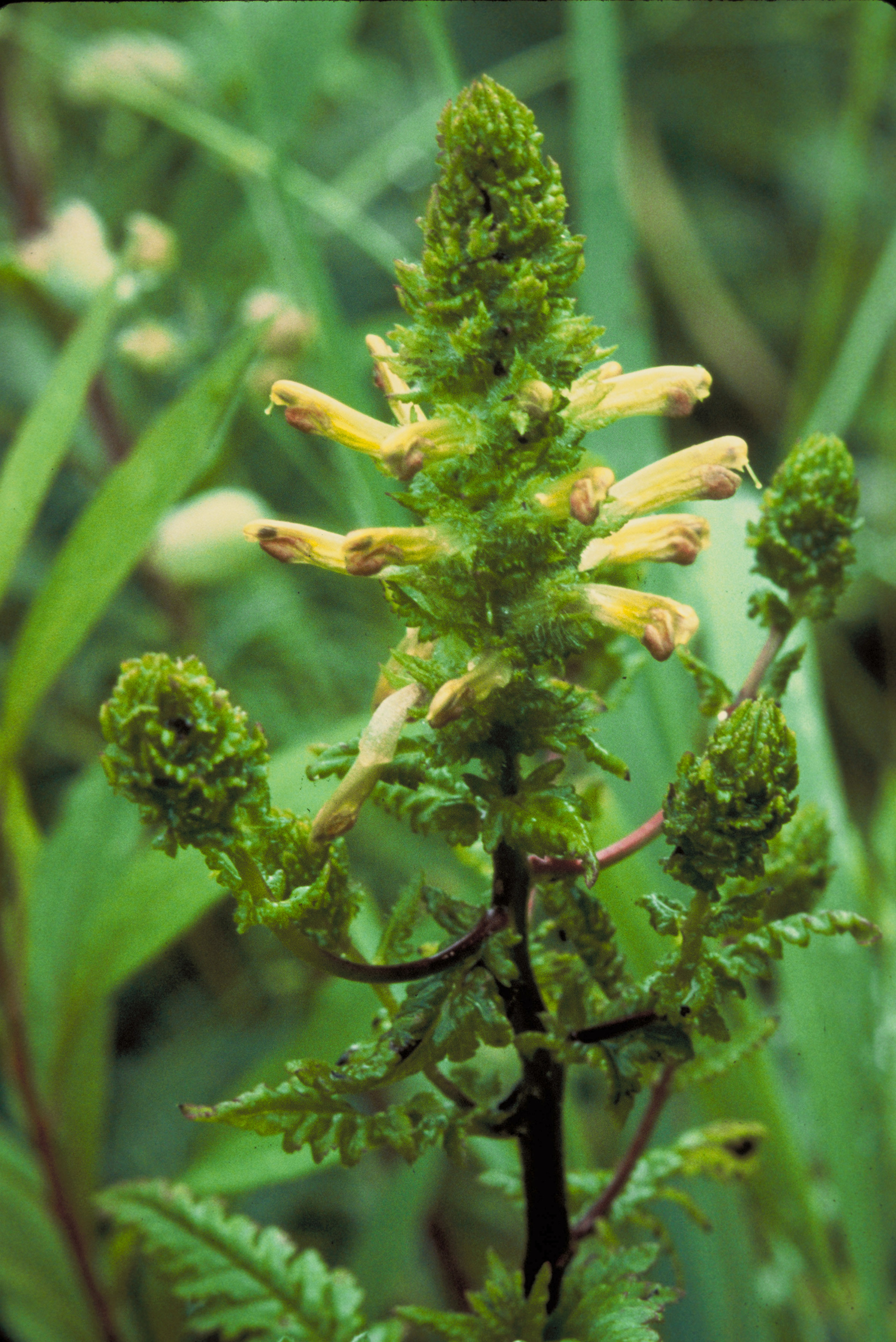
The "pedicularis furbishiae," also known as the furbish lousewart.

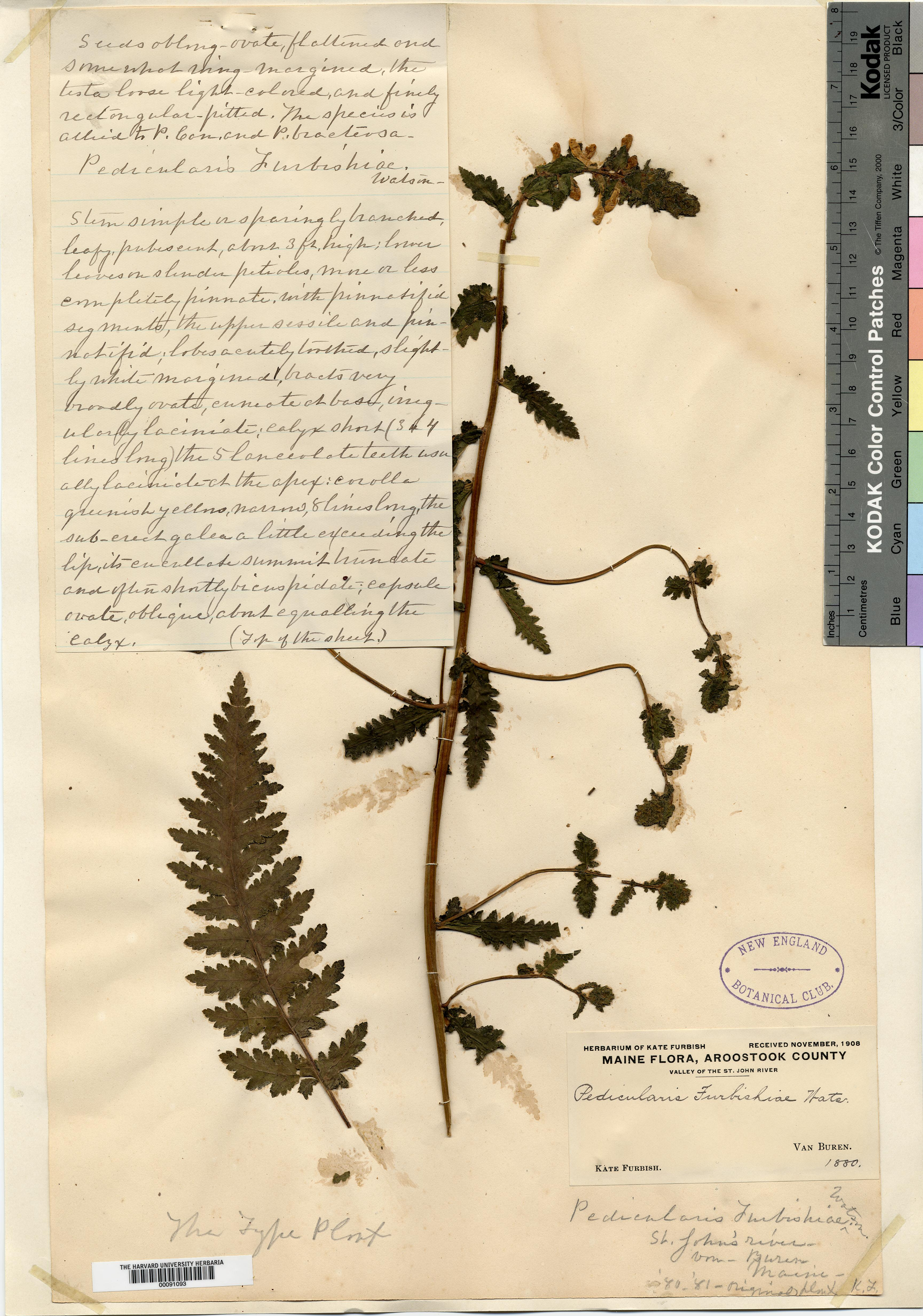
Pressing of the Pedicularis furbishiae discovered near the Saint John River.

== Career and discoveries ==
During the 38 years between 1870 and 1908, Furbish completed the majority of her painting, collecting, and classifying Maine's plant life, traveling thousands of miles across the state. She used information from Goodale's Boston lectures as well as Asa Gray's botany manual to confirm details of some of her discoveries and detailed specific sketches for her future paintings. She often traversed untouched wilderness, and in the process, her self-appointed life task resulted in over 4000 sheets of dried plants and ferns. From 1897 to 1905, Furbish made her now famous sketches of Maine's 500 mushrooms.

In 1880, when Furbish was traveling in Aroostook County, she came upon a strand of plants with dull yellow leaves. This plant now holds her name, being called Pedicularis furbishiae or Furbish's lousewort by the botanist Sereno Watson. This lousewort has never been found anywhere in the world except along a 130-mile stretch of the Saint John River. The Furbish's lousewort is so rare that in 1976, construction of a $1.3 billion hydroelectric power plant and dam project on the Saint John River was stopped in order to protect it. Another plant that holds her name is the Aster cordifolius L. var. furbishiae.

In 1894, Furbish helped to found the Josselyn Botanical Society of Maine and served as its president from 1911 to 1912. Furbish soon collected over 1,300 water colors and pressings in a book that spanned fourteen volumes she titled "Flora of Maine".

== Legacy and impact ==
In 1908, Furbish decided to distribute her research and work. The "Flora of Maine" was donated to Bowdoin College, while her 182 sheets of pressed ferns were donated to the Portland Society of Natural History, and her 4,000 sheets of dried plants to the New England Botanical Club, now in Harvard University's Gray Herbarium. All together, her work represented the flora of more than 200 Maine towns.

Furbish died of cardiac hypertrophy at the age of 97 on December 6, 1931. She was well known in the botanist and naturalist communities, and her water colors and drawings are still widely praised among professional naturalists. Furbish's resurgence in popularity helped to increase the faith and importance placed in amateurs in plant-based sciences.

In June 2018, the Town of Brunswick, ME announced that a new elementary school in the town will be named in her honor. The Kate Furbish Elementary School will serve students from pre-kindergarten through second grade and opened in the fall of 2020.
