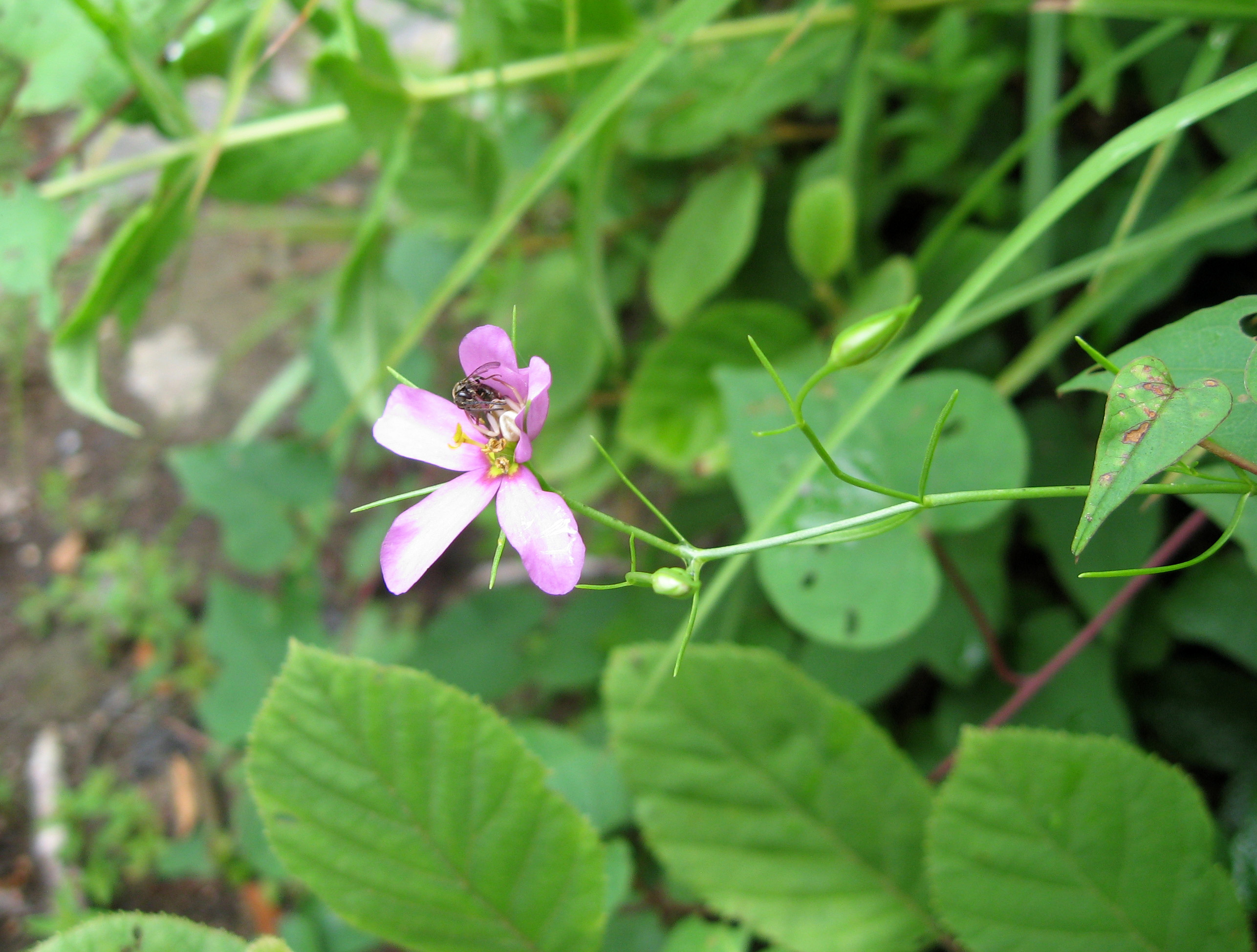

Scientific classification
- Kingdom: Plantae
- Clade: Tracheophytes
- Clade: Angiosperms
- Clade: Eudicots
- Clade: Asterids
- Order: Gentianales
- Family: Gentianaceae
- Genus: Sabatia
- Species: S. campanulata

Binomial name
- Sabatia campanulata (L.) Torr.

= Sabatia campanulata =

Species of flowering plant

Sabatia campanulata, commonly known as the slender rose gentian or slender marsh-pink, is an herbaceous plant in the gentian family. It is native to the primarily to the southeastern United States. Populations extend northward, and become increasingly rare, up the Atlantic Coast to Massachusetts.

This species is most abundant in coastal areas. Its natural habitat is open, moist, acidic areas such as bogs, seeps, and pine savannas.

It is a perennial that produces pink flowers in the summer.

The following organizations list S. campanulata as endangered: the New York Division of Land and Forests Department of Environmental Conservation, the Department of Arkansas Heritage Inventory Research Program, the Massachusetts Division of Fisheries and Wildlife Natural Heritage and Endangered Species Program, the Kentucky State Nature Preserves Commission, and the Maryland Department of Natural Resources Natural Heritage Program.
