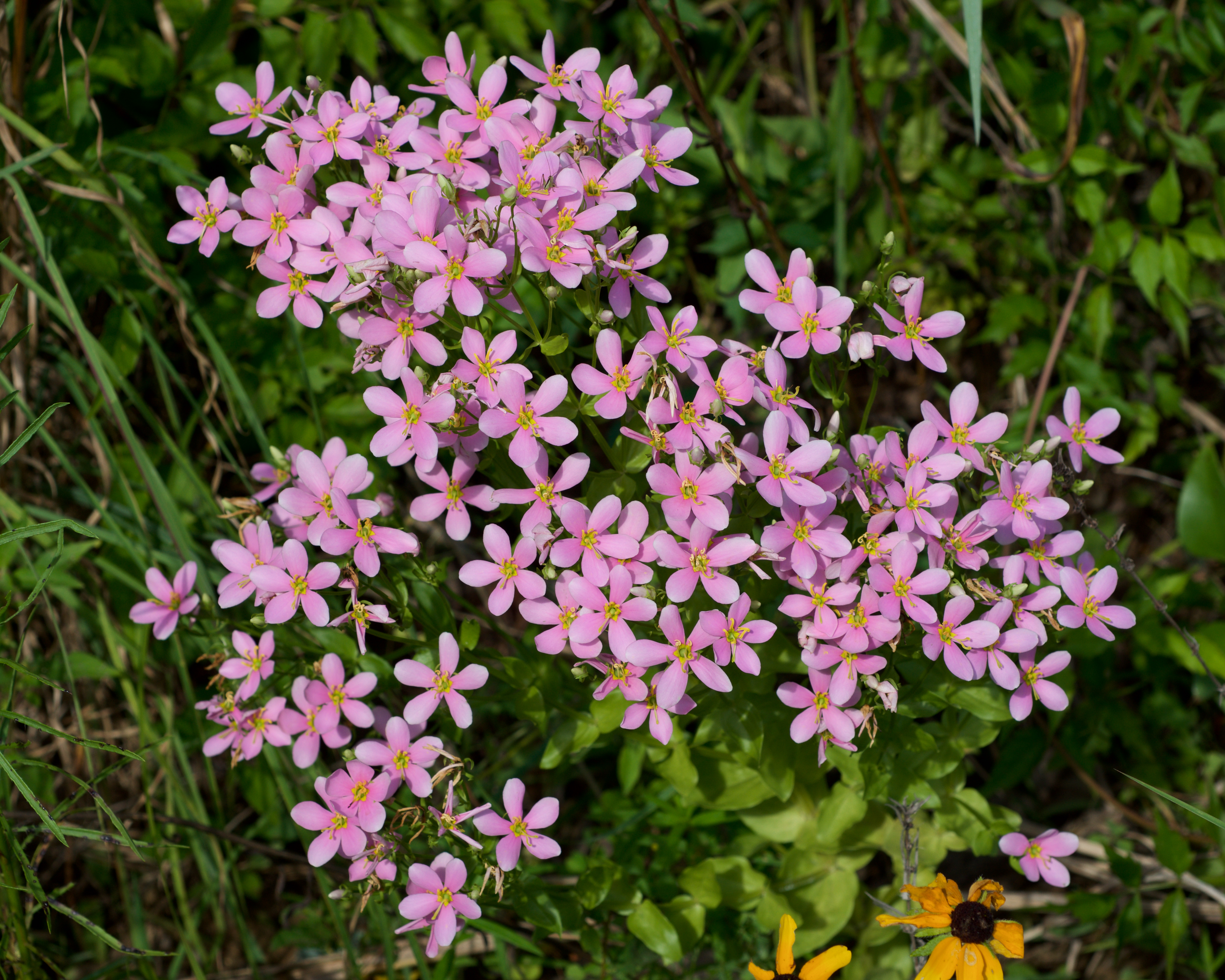
- Sabatia angularis

Scientific classification
- Kingdom: Plantae
- Clade: Tracheophytes
- Clade: Angiosperms
- Clade: Eudicots
- Clade: Asterids
- Order: Gentianales
- Family: Gentianaceae
- Tribe: Chironieae
- Subtribe: Chironiinae
- Genus: Sabatia; Adans.

Species
- See text

= Sabatia =

Genus of plants

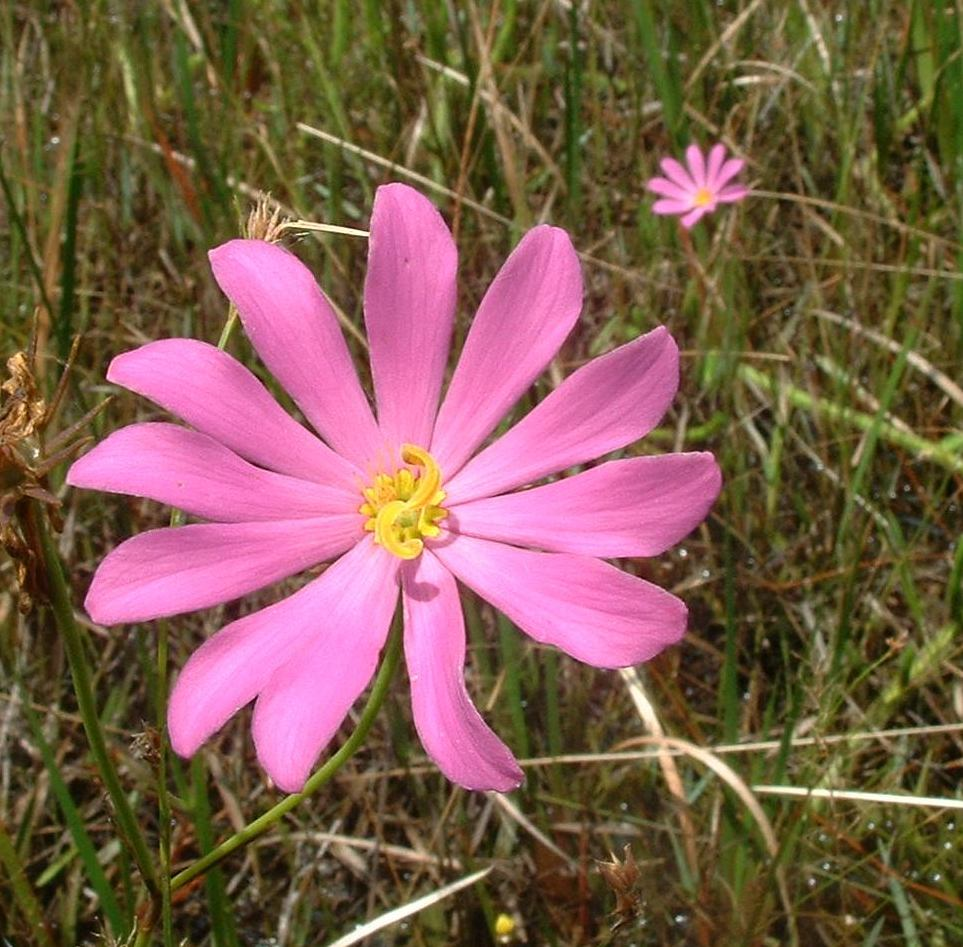
Sabatia dodecandra, the marsh rose gentian, Liberty Co. Florida.

Sabatia, the rose gentians, is a genus of about 20 species of flowering plants in the family Gentianaceae, native to eastern and central North America (Nova Scotia west to Wisconsin and New Mexico, and south to Florida and Texas), Central America, and the Caribbean.

They are annual or perennial herbaceous plants growing to 10–130 cm tall, with opposite leaves. The flowers are produced in large cymes at the top of the stems; the flower corolla has 5–12 lobes, colored pink or white, with a contrasting central yellow 'eye'. The fruit is a capsule containing numerous small seeds.

== Selected species ==
Source: USDA, Arkansas Native Plant Society

- Sabatia angularis
- Sabatia arenicola
- Sabatia arkansana
- Sabatia bartramii
- Sabatia brachiata
- Sabatia brevifolia
- Sabatia calycina
- Sabatia campanulata
- Sabatia campestris
- Sabatia capitata
- Sabatia difformis
- Sabatia dodecandra
- Sabatia formosa
- Sabatia gentianoides
- Sabatia grandiflora
- Sabatia kennedyana
- Sabatia macrophylla
- Sabatia quadrangula
- Sabatia stellaris

== Cultivation and uses ==
Several species are cultivated as ornamental plants in gardens.
