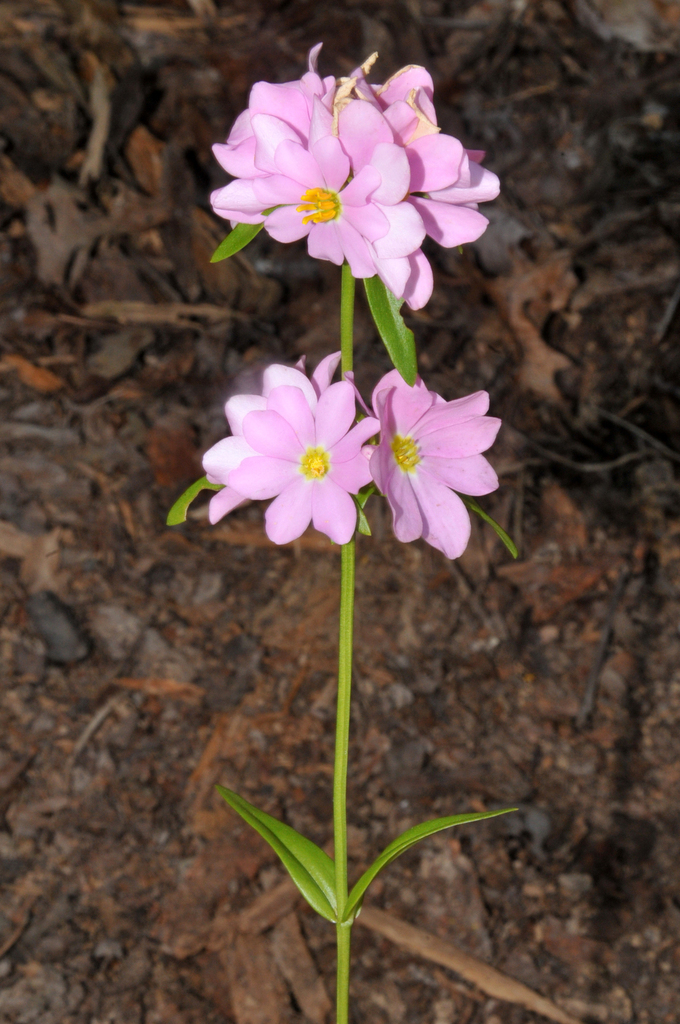
- Sabatia capitata in bloom

Conservation status
- Imperiled (NatureServe)

Scientific classification
- Kingdom: Plantae
- Clade: Embryophytes
- Clade: Tracheophytes
- Clade: Angiosperms
- Clade: Eudicots
- Clade: Asterids
- Order: Gentianales
- Family: Gentianaceae
- Genus: Sabatia
- Species: S. capitata

Binomial name
- Sabatia capitata (Raf.) S.F.Blake

Synonyms
- Pleienta capitata Raf.; Lapithea capitata (Raf.) Small; Sabatia boykinii A.Gray ex Chapm.; Lapithea boykinii (A.Gray ex Chapm.) Small

= Sabatia capitata =

Rare species of flowering plant

Sabatia capitata, commonly known as the Appalachian rose-gentian, is a rare species of flowering plant in the gentian family, Gentianaceae. It is an annual or short-lived perennial herb endemic to the southeastern United States. It occurs chiefly on the Cumberland Plateau and adjoining foothills of the Ridge-and-Valley Appalachians in Alabama, Georgia, and Tennessee.

The species inhabits wet meadows, open woodland, forest margins, roadsides, and utility rights-of-way, often in thin soils over sandstone. Suitable habitat was originally generated by wildfires; surviving populations are often reliant on human disturbance such as mowing of right-of-ways.

NatureServe classifies Sabatia capitata as G2, or globally imperiled. It is also ranked N2 in the United States and S2 in Alabama, Georgia, and Tennessee.
