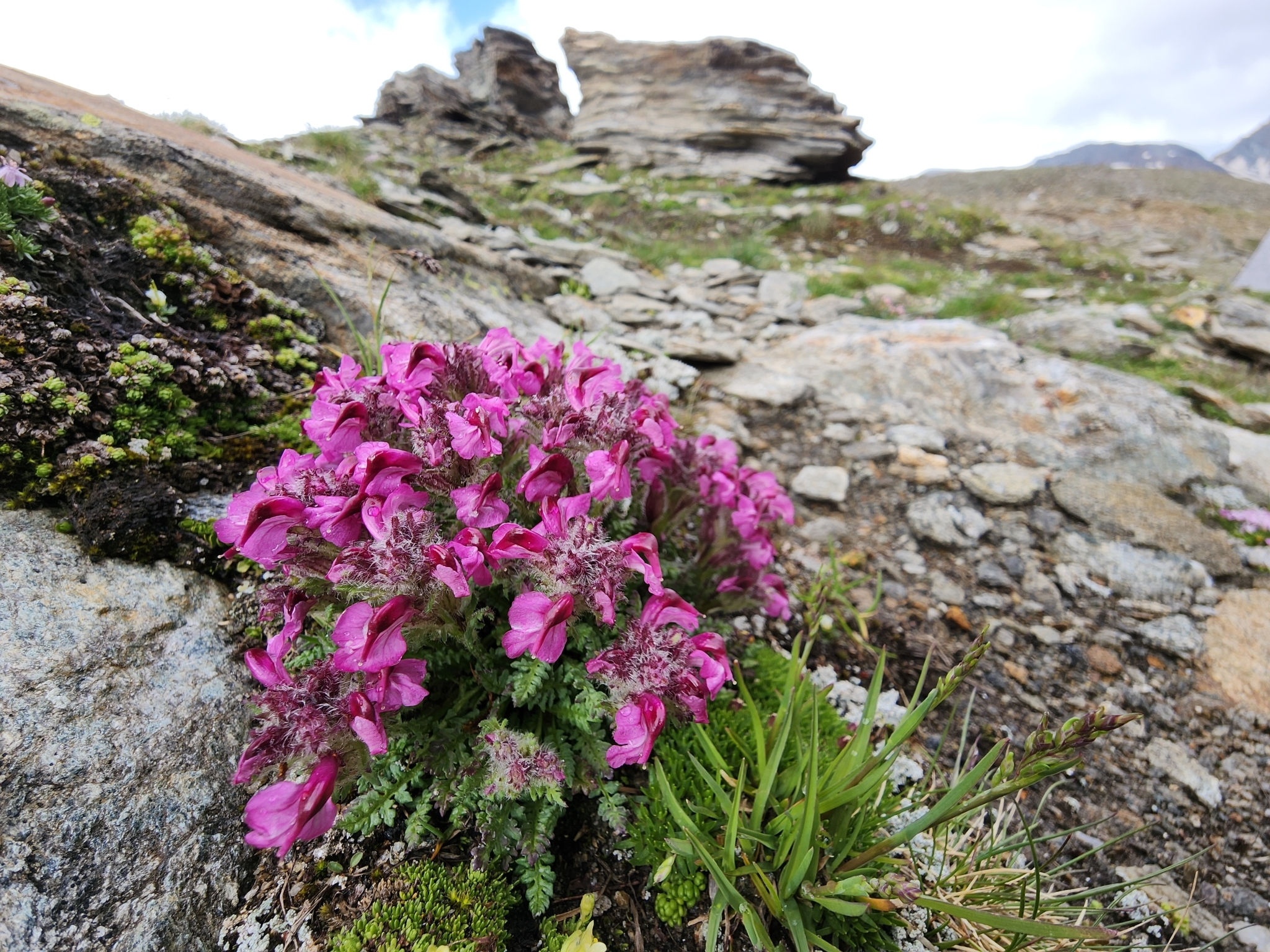
- In Lienz District, Tyrol, Austria

Scientific classification
- Kingdom: Plantae
- Clade: Tracheophytes
- Clade: Angiosperms
- Clade: Eudicots
- Clade: Asterids
- Order: Lamiales
- Family: Orobanchaceae
- Genus: Pedicularis
- Species: P. asplenifolia

Binomial name
- Pedicularis asplenifolia Flörke ex Willd.

= Pedicularis asplenifolia =

Plant species in the broomrape family

Pedicularis asplenifolia, also known as fern-leaved lousewort, is a species of lousewort that grows in the Alps.

== Description ==
Fern-leaved lousewort is a small plant growing just 2 to 8 centimeters tall. It has stems that either curve to grow upwards or grow straight up from the base of the plant. They are hairless below but lanate, covered in woolly hairs, toward the top. Its leaves are narrowly lanceolate, shaped like the head of a spear, in outline and pinnatisect, deeply divided like those of many ferns.

It blooms with a dense, head-like raceme, that may have two to eight flowers, but usually not more than five. The flowers are 17 millimeter long tubes that are red with a pink tone.

== Taxonomy ==
Pedicularis asplenifolia was scientifically described and named by Heinrich Gustav Flörke in 1800 based on work by Carl Ludwig Willdenow. It is classified in the genus Pedicularis within the family Orobanchaceae. It has no synonyms.

=== Names ===
Pedicularis asplenifolia is known as fern-leaved lousewort.

== Range and habitat ==
Pedicularis asplenifolia grows in the central and eastern Alps in Italy, Switzerland, and Austria. It grows on alkaline soils and rocks in alpine habitats.

== Ecology ==
Though, like most louseworts in the Alps, its flowers are adapted to be pollinated by bumblebees, it will often self-pollinate.

Genetic evidence and climate modeling indicate that during the Last Glacial Maximum fern-leaved lousewort was found both in areas around the ice sheet that covered the Aps and on nunataks within it.
