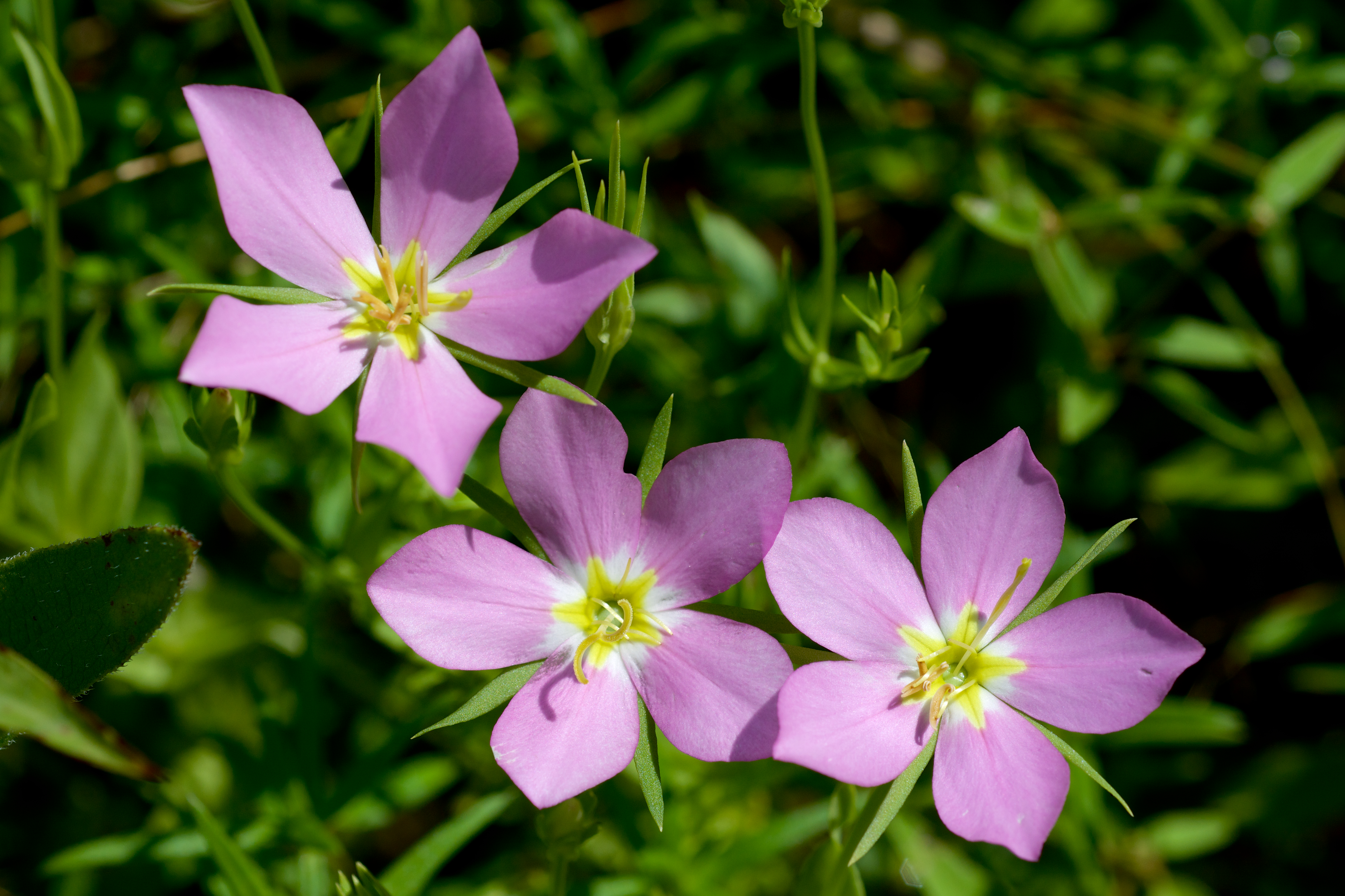

Scientific classification
- Kingdom: Plantae
- Clade: Tracheophytes
- Clade: Angiosperms
- Clade: Eudicots
- Clade: Asterids
- Order: Gentianales
- Family: Gentianaceae
- Genus: Sabatia
- Species: S. campestris

Binomial name
- Sabatia campestris Nutt. 1836

= Sabatia campestris =

Species of flowering plant

Sabatia campestris (Texas star; also prairie rose-gentian, prairie sabatia, meadow pink) is a species of Sabatia, native to the south-central United States, from Texas east to Mississippi and north to Iowa and Illinois. It is also locally naturalized in New England.

Sabatia campestris is an annual plant growing to 15–25 cm (6–10 in) tall with pairs of opposite leaves 8–40 mm long and 5–20 mm wide. The flowers are produced in open, long-stalked cymes at the top of the stems; the flower corolla is about 40 mm diameter, with five pink (rarely white) lobes with bluntly acute apices, and a contrasting bright yellow central 'eye'; they are hermaphrodite (contain both male and female organs). The fruit is a capsule containing numerous small seeds.

== Habitat ==
Its natural habitats are sandy prairies, woodland edges, and stream banks.

== Cultivation and uses ==
Sabatia campestris is cultivated as an ornamental plant in gardens, where it requires moist soil and partial to full sun.

It can be used for medical purposes as an anti-periodic and tonic. It is also possible to obtain a herbal tea from the plant.
