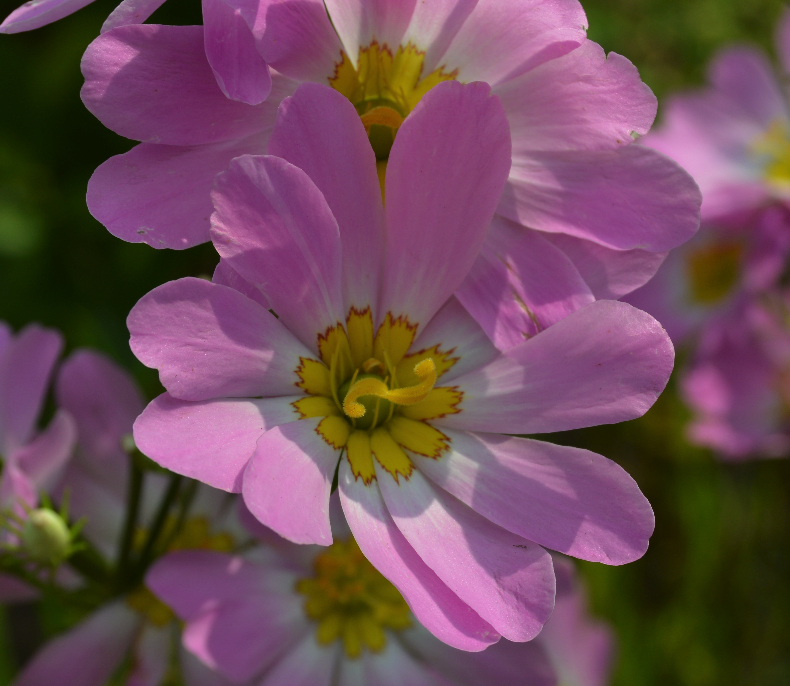

Conservation status
- Near Threatened (IUCN 3.1)

- Vulnerable (NatureServe)

Scientific classification
- Kingdom: Plantae
- Clade: Tracheophytes
- Clade: Angiosperms
- Clade: Eudicots
- Clade: Asterids
- Order: Gentianales
- Family: Gentianaceae
- Genus: Sabatia
- Species: S. kennedyana

Binomial name
- Sabatia kennedyana Fernald

Synonyms
- Sabatia dodecandra var. kennedyana (Fern.) Ahles

= Sabatia kennedyana =

Species of flowering plant

Sabatia kennedyana is a species of flowering plant in the gentian family known by the common name Plymouth rose gentian. It is native to eastern North America. It has a disjunct distribution, occurring in Nova Scotia, Massachusetts, Rhode Island, Virginia, North Carolina, and South Carolina.

== Distribution ==
Sabatia kennedyana grows in wetlands, particularly lakes and ponds on the Atlantic coastal plain. It grows in areas with fluctuating water levels and other forms of natural disturbance, such as ice scour, which eliminate competing vegetation. It is a poor competitor with other plants.

== Description ==
Sabatia kennedyana is a perennial herb with stolons tipped with basal rosettes of leaves. The flower is pink with a white or yellow center. It may be 5 centimeters wide, with 9 to 11 petals.

== Taxonomy ==
Sabatia kennedyana was considered by Ahles to be a variety of Sabatia dodecandra. It was named after George Golding Kennedy

== Conservation ==
Sabatia kennedyana is threatened by shoreline development, recreational activity, off-road vehicles, construction of hydroelectric dams, pollution, and poaching.
