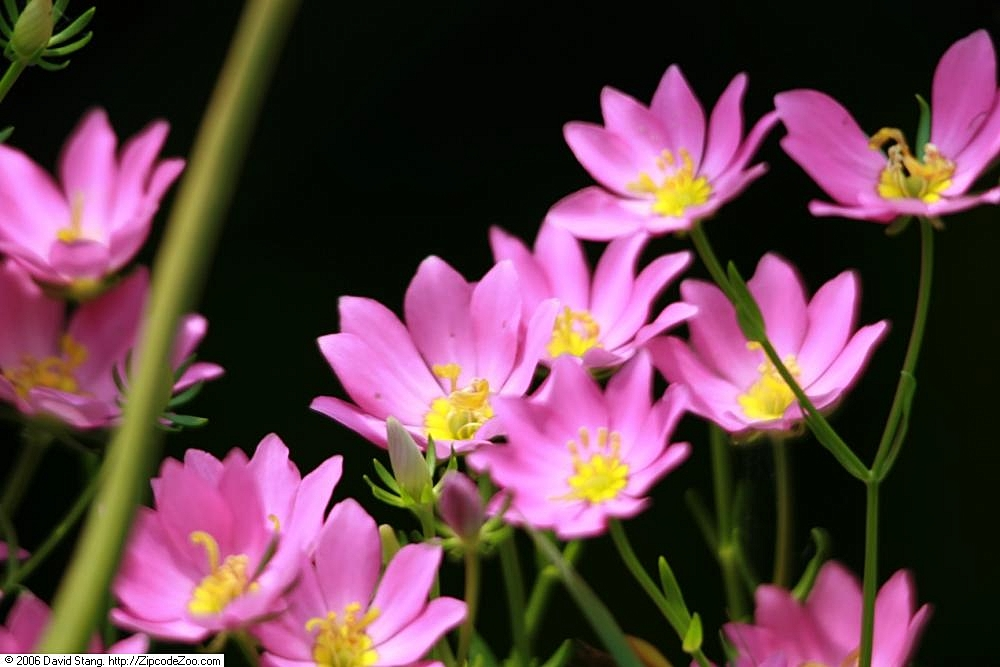

Scientific classification
- Kingdom: Plantae
- Clade: Tracheophytes
- Clade: Angiosperms
- Clade: Eudicots
- Clade: Asterids
- Order: Gentianales
- Family: Gentianaceae
- Genus: Sabatia
- Species: S. dodecandra

Binomial name
- Sabatia dodecandra (L.) Britton, Sterns & Poggenb.

= Sabatia dodecandra =

Species of flowering plant

Sabatia dodecandra, common names large marsh pink or marsh rose gentian, is a plant in the Gentianaceae family.

== Conservation status in the United States ==
It is listed as a special concern and believed extirpated in Connecticut.
