= Pedicularis caeruleoalbescens =

Scientific classification
- Kingdom: Plantae
- Clade: Tracheophytes
- Clade: Angiosperms
- Clade: Eudicots
- Clade: Asterids
- Order: Lamiales
- Family: Orobanchaceae
- Genus: Pedicularis
- Species: P. caeruleoalbescens

Binomial name
- Pedicularis caeruleoalbescens Wendelbo

Species of flowering plant

Pedicularis caeruleoalbescens is a plant species that belongs to the Pedicularis genus. It was first described in Nytt Magasin for Botanik in 1952. This species is native to Northern Pakistan and is a perennial plant that primarily grows in subalpine or subarctic biomes.

== Taxonomy ==
Pedicularis caeruleoalbescens is part of the Pedicularis genus, which consists of perennial green root parasite plants that are currently classified under the Orobanchaceae family (previously classified under Scrophulariaceae sensu lato).
