= List of Salix species =

The following species in the genus Salix are recognised by Plants of the World Online:

== Extant species ==
- Salix abscondita Lacksch.
- Salix acmophylla Boiss.
- Salix acutifolia Willd. – violet willow
- Salix aegyptiaca L.
- Salix aeruginosa E.Carranza
- Salix alatavica Kar. ex Stschegl.
- Salix alaxensis (Andersson) Coville – Alaska willow
- Salix alba L. – white willow
- Salix alexii-skvortzovii A.P.Khokhr.
- Salix alpina Scop. – alpine willow
- Salix amplexicaulis Bory & Chaub.
- Salix amygdaloides Andersson – peachleaf willow
- Salix anatolica Ziel. & D.Tomasz.
- Salix annulifera C.Marquand & Airy Shaw
- Salix anticecrenata Kimura
- Salix apennina A.K.Skvortsov
- Salix apoda Trautv.
- Salix appendiculata Vill.
- Salix arbuscula L. – mountain willow
- Salix arbusculoides Andersson – littletree willow
- Salix arbutifolia Pall.
- Salix arctica Pall. – Arctic willow
- Salix arctophila Cockerell
- Salix argyracea E.L.Wolf
- Salix argyrocarpa Andersson
- Salix arizonica Dorn
- Salix armeno-rossica A.K.Skvortsov
- Salix arrigonii Brullo
- Salix athabascensis Raup
- Salix atopantha C.K.Schneid.
- Salix atrocinerea Brot. – grey willow
- Salix aurita L. – eared willow
- Salix austrotibetica N.Chao
- Salix babylonica L. – Babylon willow, Peking willow
- Salix baileyi C.K.Schneid.
- Salix balansae Seemen
- Salix balfouriana C.K.Schneid.
- Salix ballii Dorn
- Salix bangongensis Z.Wang & C.F.Fang
- Salix barclayi Andersson – Barclay's willow
- Salix barrattiana Hook. – Barratt's willow
- Salix bebbiana Sarg. – beaked willow
- Salix berberifolia Pall.
- Salix bhutanensis
- Salix bicolor Ehrh. ex Willd.
- Salix bikouensis Y.L.Chou
- Salix blakii Goerz
- Salix blinii H.Lév.
- Salix bonplandiana Kunth – Bonpland willow, ahuejote
- Salix boothii Dorn – Booth's willow
- Salix borealis Fr.
- Salix boseensis N.Chao
- Salix brachycarpa Nutt. – barren-ground willow
- Salix brachypoda (Trautv. & C.A.Mey.) Kom.
- Salix breviserrata Flod.
- Salix breweri Bebb – Brewer's willow
- Salix brutia Brullo & G.Spamp.
- Salix cacuminis A.K.Skvortsov
- Salix caesia Vill.
- Salix calcicola Fernald & Wiegand – limestone willow
- Salix calyculata Hook.f. ex Andersson
- Salix cana M.Martens & Galeotti
- Salix candida Flüggé ex Willd. – sage willow
- Salix caprea L. – goat willow
- Salix capusii Franch.
- Salix cardiophylla Trautv. & C.A.Mey.
- Salix carmanica Bornm.
- Salix caroliniana Michx. – coastal plain willow
- Salix cascadensis Cockerell
- Salix caspica Pall.
- Salix cathayana Diels
- Salix caucasica Andersson
- Salix cavaleriei H.Lév.
- Salix chaenomeloides Kimura
- Salix chamissonis Andersson
- Salix characta C.K.Schneid.
- Salix chevalieri Seemen
- Salix cheilophila C.K.Schneid.
- Salix chienii Cheng
- Salix chikungensis C.K.Schneid.
- Salix chilensis Molina
- Salix chlorolepis Fernald
- Salix cinerea L. – grey sallow
- Salix clathrata Hand.-Mazz.
- Salix coggygria Hand.-Mazz.
- Salix columbiana Argus – Columbia River willow
- Salix coluteoides Mirb.
- Salix commutata Bebb – undergreen willow
- Salix contortiapiculata P.I Mao & W.Z.Li
- Salix cordata Michx. – heartleaf, sand dune willow
- Salix crataegifolia Bertol.
- Salix cupularis Rehder
- Salix daguanensis P.I Mao & P.X. He
- Salix daliensis C.F.Fang & S.D.Zhao
- Salix daltoniana Andersson
- Salix dalungensis Z.Wang & P.Y.Fu
- Salix daphnoides Vill.
- Salix delavayana Hand.-Mazz.
- Salix delnortensis C.K.Schneid. – del Norte willow
- Salix denticulata Andersson
- Salix dibapha C.K.Schneid.
- Salix discolor Muhl. – American willow, pussy willow
- Salix disperma Roxb. ex D.Don
- Salix dissa C.K.Schneid.
- Salix divergentistyla C.F.Fang
- Salix divaricata Pall.
- Salix doii Hayata
- Salix dolichostachya Flod.
- Salix donggouxianica C.F.Fang
- Salix driophila C.K.Schneid.
- Salix drummondiana Barratt ex Hook. – Drummond's willow
- Salix dshugdshurica A.K.Skvortsov
- Salix eastwoodiae Cockerell ex A.Heller – Eastwood's willow
- Salix eleagnos Scop.
- Salix eriocephala Michx. – heartleaf willow
- Salix erioclada H. Lév. & Vaniot
- Salix eriostachya Wall. ex Andersson
- Salix ernestii C.K.Schneid.
- Salix erythrocarpa Kom.
- Salix euxina I.V.Belyaeva
- Salix excelsa S.G.Gmel.
- Salix exigua Nutt. – sandbar willow
- Salix famelica (C.R.Ball) Argus
- Salix fargesii Burkill
- Salix farriae C.R.Ball
- Salix fedtschenkoi Goerz
- Salix flabellaris Andersson
- Salix floccosa Burkill
- Salix floridana Chapm.
- Salix foetida Schleich. ex DC.
- Salix fruticulosa Andersson
- Salix fulvopubescens Hayata
- Salix fuscescens Andersson – Alaska bog willow
- Salix futura Seemen
- Salix geyeriana Andersson
- Salix gilgiana Seemen
- Salix glabra Scop.
- Salix glauca L. – northern willow
- Salix glaucosericea Flod.
- Salix gmelinii Pall.
- Salix gonggashanica C.F.Fang & A.K.Skvortsov
- Salix gooddingii C.R.Ball – Goodding willow
- Salix gracilior (Siuzew) Nakai
- Salix gracilistyla Miq.
- Salix guinieri Chass. & Goerz
- Salix gussonei Brullo & G.Spamp.
- Salix hartwegii Benth.
- Salix hastata L.
- Salix hegetschweileri Heer
- Salix helvetica Vill. – Swiss willow
- Salix herbacea L. – dwarf willow
- Salix hookeriana Barratt ex Hook. – Hooker's willow
- Salix hukaoana Kimura
- Salix humboldtiana – Chile willow
- Salix humilis Marshall – upland willow
- Salix iliensis Regel
- Salix interior Rowlee
- Salix ionica Brullo, F.Scelsi & G.Spamp.
- Salix irrorata Andersson
- Salix jaliscana M.E.Jones
- Salix japonica Thunb.
- Salix jejuna Fernald – barrens willow
- Salix jenisseensis (F.Schmidt) Flod.
- Salix jepsonii C.K.Schneid. – Jepson's willow
- Salix juparica Goerz ex Rehder & Kobuski
- Salix jurtzevii A.K.Skvortsov
- Salix kalarica (A.K.Skvortsov) Vorosch.
- Salix kangensis Nakai
- Salix karelinii Turcz. ex Stschegl.
- Salix khokhriakovii A.K.Skvortsov
- Salix kirilowiana Stschegl.
- Salix kitaibeliana Willd.
- Salix kochiana Trautv.
- Salix koeieana A.K.Skvortsov
- Salix koriyanagi Kimura ex Goerz
- Salix krylovii E.L.Wolf
- Salix kusanoi (Hayata) C.K.Schneid.
- Salix kuznetzowii Laksch. ex Goerz
- Salix laevigata Bebb – red willow
- Salix laggeri Wimm.
- Salix lanata L. – woolly willow
- Salix lapponum L. – downy willow
- Salix lasiandra Benth.
- Salix lasiolepis Benth. – arroyo willow
- Salix ledebouriana Trautv.
- Salix ledermannii Seemen
- Salix lemmonii Bebb – Lemmon's willow
- Salix ligulifolia (C.R.Ball) C.R.Ball ex C.K.Schneid. – strapleaf willow
- Salix lindleyana Wall. ex Andersson
- Salix longiflora Wall. ex Andersson
- Salix longistamina Z.Wang & P.Y.Fu
- Salix lucida Muhl. – shining willow
- Salix luctuosa H.Lév.
- Salix ludlowiana A.K.Skvortsov
- Salix lutea Nutt. – yellow willow
- Salix maccalliana Rowlee
- Salix magnifica Hemsl.
- Salix martiana Leyb.
- Salix melanopsis Nutt. – dusky willow
- Salix mesnyi Hance
- Salix mexicana Seemen
- Salix michelsonii Goerz ex Nasarow
- Salix microphylla Schltdl. & Cham.
- Salix microstachya Turcz. ex Trautv.
- Salix mielichhoferi Saut.
- Salix miyabeana Seemen
- Salix monochroma C.R.Ball
- Salix monticola Bebb
- Salix moupinensis Franch.
- Salix mucronata Thunb.
- Salix muliensis Goerz
- Salix myricoides Muhl.
- Salix myrsinifolia Salisb. – dark-leaved willow
- Salix myrsinites L. – whortle-leaved willow
- Salix myrtillacea Andersson
- Salix myrtillifolia Andersson
- Salix myrtilloides L. – swamp willow
- Salix nakamurana Koidz.
- Salix nasarovii A.K.Skvortsov
- Salix niedzwieckii Goerz
- Salix nigra Marshall – black willow
- Salix niphoclada Rydb.
- Salix nipponica Franch. & Sav.
- Salix nivalis Hook.
- Salix nummularia Andersson
- Salix nuristanica A.K.Skvortsov
- Salix obscura Andersson
- Salix olgae Regel
- Salix opsimantha C.K.Schneid.
- Salix oreinoma C.K.Schneid.
- Salix oreophila Hook.f. ex Andersson
- Salix orestera C.K.Schneid. – Sierra willow
- Salix oritrepha C.K.Schneid.
- Salix oropotamica Brullo, F.Scelsi & G.Spamp.
- Salix ovalifolia Trautv.
- Salix pantosericea Goerz
- Salix paradoxa Kunth
- Salix paraflabellaris S.D.Zhao
- Salix paraplesia C.K.Schneid.
- Salix pedicellaris Pursh – bog willow
- Salix pedicellata Desf.
- Salix pellita (Andersson) Bebb
- Salix pentandra L. – bay willow
- Salix pentandrifolia Sennikov
- Salix petiolaris Sm. – slender willow
- Salix petrophila Rydb.
- Salix phlebophylla Andersson
- Salix phylicifolia L. – tea-leaved willow
- Salix pierotii Miq.
- Salix planifolia Pursh – planeleaf willow
- Salix plocotricha C.K.Schneid.
- Salix polaris Wahlenb. – polar willow
- Salix prolixa Andersson – MacKenzie's willow
- Salix pseudocalyculata Kimura
- Salix pseudodepressa A.K.Skvortsov
- Salix pseudomedemii E.L.Wolf
- Salix pseudomonticola C.R.Ball
- Salix pseudomyrsinites Andersson
- Salix pseudopentandra (Flod.) Flod.
- Salix pseudospissa Goerz ex Rehder & Kobuski
- Salix pseudowallichiana Goerz ex Rehder & Kobuski
- Salix psilostigma Andersson
- Salix pulchra Cham.
- Salix purpurea L. – purple willow
- Salix pycnostachya Andersson
- Salix pyrenaica Gouan
- Salix pyrifolia Andersson – balsam willow
- Salix pyrolifolia Ledeb.
- Salix qinghaiensis Y.L.Chou
- Salix radinostachya C.K.Schneid.
- Salix raupii Argus
- Salix rectijulis Ledeb. ex Trautv.
- Salix recurvigemmata A.K.Skvortsov
- Salix rehderiana C.K.Schneid.
- Salix reinii Franch. & Sav. ex Seemen
- Salix repens L. – creeping willow
- Salix reptans Rupr.
- Salix reticulata L. – net-leaved willow
- Salix retusa L.
- Salix rhamnifolia Pall.
- Salix rhododendroides C.Wang & C.Y.Yu
- Salix richardsonii Hook. – possible synonym of Salix lanata
- Salix riskindii M.C.Johnst.
- Salix rockii Goerz ex Rehder & Kobuski
- Salix rorida Laksch.
- Salix rosmarinifolia L. – rosemary-leaved willow
- Salix rotundifolia Trautv.
- Salix rupifraga Koidz.
- Salix sajanensis Nasarow
- Salix salviifolia Brot.
- Salix salwinensis Hand.-Mazz. ex Enander
- Salix saposhnikovii A.K.Skvortsov
- Salix saxatilis Turcz. ex Ledeb.
- Salix schwerinii E.L.Wolf
- Salix sclerophylla Andersson
- Salix scouleriana Barratt ex Hook. – Scouler's willow
- Salix sericea Marshall – silky willow
- Salix sericocarpa Andersson
- Salix serissima (L.H.Bailey ex Arthur) Fernald – autumn willow
- Salix serpillifolia Scop.
- Salix sessilifolia Nutt.
- Salix setchelliana C.R.Ball
- Salix shiraii Seemen
- Salix sieboldiana Blume
- Salix sikkimensis Andersson
- Salix silesiaca Willd.
- Salix silicicola Raup
- Salix sitchensis Sanson ex Bong. – Sitka willow
- Salix songarica Andersson
- Salix spathulifolia Seemen
- Salix sphaeronymphe Goerz
- Salix sphenophylla A.K.Skvortsov
- Salix staintoniana A.K.Skvortsov
- Salix starkeana Willd.
- Salix stolonifera Coville
- Salix stomatophora Flod.
- Salix subopposita Miq.
- Salix suchowensis W.C.Cheng
- Salix sumiyosensis Kimura
- Salix taiwanalpina Kimura
- Salix taraikensis Kimura
- Salix tarraconensis Pau
- Salix taxifolia Kunth – yewleaf willow
- Salix tengchongensis C.F.Fang
- Salix tenuijulis Ledeb.
- Salix tetrasperma Roxb.
- Salix thomsoniana Andersson
- Salix thorelii Dode
- Salix thurberi Rowlee
- Salix tianschanica Regel
- Salix tibetica Goerz ex Rehder & Kobuski
- Salix tonkinensis Seemen
- Salix tracyi C.R.Ball
- Salix triandra L. – almond willow
- Salix triandroides W.P.Fang
- Salix tschujensis (Bolsch.) Baikov
- Salix tschuktschorum A.K.Skvortsov
- Salix turanica Nasarow
- Salix turczaninowii (Laksch.)
- Salix turnorii Raup
- Salix tweedyi (Bebb) C.R.Ball
- Salix tyrrellii Raup
- Salix tyrrhenica Brullo, F.Scelsi & Spamp.
- Salix udensis (Wimm.) Trautv. & C.A.Mey.
- Salix uralicola I.V.Belyaeva
- Salix uva-ursi Pursh – bearberry willow
- Salix variegata Franch.
- Salix vestita Pursh – silky willow
- Salix viminalis L. – common osier
- Salix vinogradovii A.K.Skvortsov
- Salix vulpina Andersson
- Salix waldsteiniana Willd.
- Salix wilhelmsiana M.Bieb.
- Salix wolfii Bebb
- Salix wuxuhaiensis N.Chao
- Salix xanthicola K.I.Chr.
- Salix zangica N.Chao

=== Hybrid species ===
- Salix × aberrans A.Camus & E.G.Camus
- Salix × algista C.K.Schneid.
- Salix × altobracensis H.J.Coste
- Salix × ambigua Ehrh.
- Salix × amoena Fernald
- Salix × ampherista C.K.Schneid.
- Salix × angusensis Rech.f.
- Salix × arakiana Koidz.
- Salix × argusii B.Boivin
- Salix × aschersoniana Seemen
- Salix × austriaca Host
- Salix × balfourii E.F.Linton
- Salix × beckiana Beck
- Salix × boettcheri Seemen
- Salix × boulayi F.Gérard
- Salix × brachypurpurea B.Boivin
- Salix × buseri Favrat
- Salix × calliantha Jos.Kern.
- Salix × canescens Willd.
- Salix × capreola A.Kern. ex Andersson
- Salix × cernua E.F.Linton
- Salix × charrieri Chass.
- Salix × coerulescens Döll
- Salix × confinis A.Camus & E.G.Camus
- Salix × conifera Wangenh.
- Salix × cottetii A.Kern.
- Salix × cremnophila Kimura
- Salix × devestita Arv.-Touv.
- Salix × dichroa Döll
- Salix × digenea Jos.Kern.
- Salix × doniana Sm.
- Salix × dutillyi Lepage
- Salix × ehrhartiana Sm.
- Salix × erdingeri A.Kern.
- Salix × eriocataphylla Kimura
- Salix × eriocataphylloides Kimura
- Salix × erythroclados Simonk.
- Salix × euerata Kimura
- Salix × euryadenia Ausserd. ex A.Kern.
- Salix × finnmarchica Willd.
- Salix × flueggeana Willd.
- Salix × forbesiana Druce
- Salix × forbyana Sm.
- Salix × fragilis L.
- Salix × friesiana Andersson
- Salix × fruticosa Döll
- Salix × gaspensis C.K.Schneid.
- Salix × gillotii A.Camus & E.G.Camus
- Salix × glatfelterii C.K.Schneid.
- Salix × grahamii Borrer ex Baker
- Salix × grayi C.K.Schneid.
- Salix × hapala Kimura
- Salix × hatusimae Kimura
- Salix × hayatana Kimura
- Salix × hebecarpa (Fernald) Fernald
- Salix × hermaphroditica L.
- Salix × hiraoana Kimura
- Salix × hirsutophylla A.Camus & E.G.Camus
- Salix × hirtii Strähler
- Salix × hisauchiana Koidz.
- Salix × hostii A.Kern.
- Salix × hudsonensis C.K.Schneid.
- Salix × ikenoana Kimura
- Salix × intermedia Host
- Salix × inticensis Huter
- Salix × iwahisana Kimura
- Salix × jamesensis Lepage
- Salix × japopina Kimura
- Salix × jesupii Fernald
- Salix × kamikotica Kimura
- Salix × kawamurana Kimura
- Salix × koidzumii Kimura
- Salix × koiei Kimura
- Salix × krausei Andersson
- Salix × kudoi Kimura
- Salix × lambertiana Sm.
- Salix × latifolia J.Forbes
- Salix × laurentiana Fernald
- Salix × laurina Sm.
- Salix × leiophylla A.Camus & E.G.Camus
- Salix × leucopithecia Kimura
- Salix × lintonii A.Camus & E.G.Camus
- Salix × litigiosa A.Camus & E.G.Camus
- Salix × lochsiensis D.J.Tennant
- Salix × ludibunda A.Camus & E.G.Camus
- Salix × ludificans F.B.White
- Salix × lyonensis D.J.Tennant
- Salix × margaretae Seemen
- Salix × margarita F.B.White
- Salix × mariana Wol.
- Salix × maritima Hartig
- Salix × matsumurae Seemen
- Salix × meikleana D.J.Tennant
- Salix × meyeriana Rostk. ex Willd.
- Salix × microstemon Kimura
- Salix × mollissima Hoffm. ex Elwert
- Salix × montana Host
- Salix × multinervis Döll
- Salix × myrtoides Döll
- Salix × nasuensis Kimura
- Salix × neuburgensis Erdner
- Salix × notha Andersson
- Salix × obtusifolia Willd.
- Salix × oleifolia Vill.
- Salix × onychiophylla Andersson
- Salix × peasei Fernald
- Salix × pedionoma Kimura
- Salix × pedunculata Fernald
- Salix × peloritana Prestandr. ex Tineo
- Salix × pendulina Wender.
- Salix × permixta Jeanne Webb
- Salix × perthensis Druce
- Salix × phaeophylla Andersson
- Salix × pithoensis Rouy
- Salix × pseudodoniana Rouy
- Salix × pseudoglauca Andersson
- Salix × pseudopaludicola Kimura
- Salix × punctata Wahlenb.
- Salix × quercifolia Sennen ex Goerz
- Salix × reichardtii A.Kern.
- Salix × retusoides Jos.Kern.
- Salix × rubella Bebb ex Rowlee & Wiegand
- Salix × rubra Huds.
- Salix × rubriformis Tourlet
- Salix × rugulosa Andersson
- Salix × sadleri Syme
- Salix × saxetana F.B.White
- Salix × schaburovii I.V.Belyaeva
- Salix × schatilowii R.I.Schröd. ex Dippel
- Salix × schatzii Sagorski
- Salix × schneideri B.Boivin
- Salix × scholzii Rouy
- Salix × schumanniana Seemen
- Salix × secerneta F.B.White
- Salix × semimyrtilloides A.Camus & E.G.Camus
- Salix × seminigricans A.Camus & E.G.Camus
- Salix × semireticulata F.B.White
- Salix × semiviminalis E.L.Wolf
- Salix × sendaica Kimura
- Salix × sepulcralis group – hybrid willows
- Salix × sepulcralis 'Chrysocoma' – golden weeping willow
- Salix × seringeana Gaudin
- Salix × sesquitertia F.B.White
- Salix × sibyllina F.B.White
- Salix × sigemitui Kimura
- Salix × simulatrix F.B.White
- Salix × sirakawensis Kimura
- Salix × sobrina F.B.White
- Salix × speciosa Host
- Salix × straehleri Seemen
- Salix × strepida J.Forbes
- Salix × subglabra A.Kern.
- Salix × subsericea Döll
- Salix × sugayana Kimura
- Salix × tambaensis Koidz. & Araki
- Salix × taoensis Goerz ex Rehder & Kobuski
- Salix × taylorii Rech.f.
- Salix × teplouchovii R.I.Schröd. ex Wolkenst.
- Salix × tetrapla Walk.
- Salix × thaymasta Kimura
- Salix × tomentella A.Camus & E.G.Camus
- Salix × turfosa A.Camus & E.G.Camus
- Salix × turumatii Kimura
- Salix × viciosorum Sennen & Pau
- Salix × waghornei Rydb.
- Salix × wiegandii Fernald
- Salix × wimmeri A.Kern.
- Salix × woloszczakii Zalewski
- Salix × wrightii Andersson
- Salix × wyomingensis Rydb.

== Fossil species ==
In addition to the living species and hybrids, a number of fossil species have been ascribed to Salix:

- †Salix abbreviata Göppert
- †Salix acutissima Göppert
- †Salix akitaensis Huzioka & Uemura
- †Salix alaskana
- †Salix albiformis
- †Salix amygdalifolia
- †Salix andromedae
- †Salix angusta
- †Salix angustifolia
- †Salix angustissima
- †Salix apollinis
- †Salix aquensis
- †Salix aquitanica
- †Salix arcinervea
- †Salix arcuata
- †Salix arguta
- †Salix arnaudii
- †Salix assimilis
- †Salix attenuata
- †Salix axonensis
- †Salix baikovskajae
- †Salix bebbianiformis
- †Salix bienensis
- †Salix bilinica
- †Salix boisiensis
- †Salix brevipes
- †Salix bruckmannii
- †Salix bryanii
- †Salix californica
- †Salix cappsensis
- †Salix capreiformis
- †Salix castaneifolia
- †Salix chuitensis
- †Salix cinereiformis
- †Salix coalingensis
- †Salix cockerellii
- †Salix coloradica
- †Salix confirmata
- †Salix cookensis
- †Salix cordato-lanceolata
- †Salix coriacea
- †Salix cormickii
- †Salix crebrinervia
- †Salix crenatoserrulata
- †Salix cumberlandensis
- †Salix cuneata
- †Salix dayana
- †Salix deleta
- †Salix delicata
- †Salix demersa
- †Salix densinervis
- †Salix dentata
- †Salix denticulata Heer
- †Salix deperdita
- †Salix dianae
- †Salix discoloripites
- †Salix dodonaeiformis
- †Salix dornacencis
- †Salix elliptica
- †Salix elongata
- †Salix enbekshiensis
- †Salix engelhardtii
- †Salix etolonensis
- †Salix eutawensis
- †Salix evanstoniana
- †Salix falcifolia
- †Salix finlayi
- †Salix flexuosa
- †Salix foliosa
- †Salix fragiliformis
- †Salix frontierensis
- †Salix gardneri
- †Salix glaucifolia
- †Salix goetziana
- †Salix gracilis
- †Salix grandifolia
- †Salix groenlandica
- †Salix haidingeri
- †Salix hartigii
- †Salix hausruckensis
- †Salix hayei
- †Salix hilberi
- †Salix hokiensis
- †Salix hokkaidoensis
- †Salix holzeri
- †Salix holzhausensis
- †Salix inaequalis
- †Salix inaequilatera
- †Salix infracretacica
- †Salix inouei
- †Salix inquirenda
- †Salix integra
- †Salix ionensis
- †Salix islandica
- †Salix itelmenensis
- †Salix kachemakensis
- †Salix kamloopsiana
- †Salix kamtschatica
- †Salix kattitauca
- †Salix keijisuzukii
- †Salix kempffii
- †Salix kenaiana
- †Salix kernensis
- †Salix kicktonii
- †Salix kitamiensis
- †Salix knowltonii
- †Salix lamottei
- †Salix lamottii
- †Salix lancifolia
- †Salix laramiana
- †Salix laramina
- †Salix latifolia
- †Salix lavateri
- †Salix leopoldae
- †Salix lesquereuxii
- †Salix libbeyi
- †Salix linearifolia Göppert
- †Salix linearis
- †Salix lingulata
- †Salix longa
- †Salix longinqua
- †Salix longissima
- †Salix lowei
- †Salix macrophylla
- †Salix malaisei
- †Salix maritima
- †Salix masamunei
- †Salix mattewanensis
- †Salix media
- †Salix meekii
- †Salix membranacea
- †Salix merriamii
- †Salix microserrata
- †Salix minuta
- †Salix minutissima
- †Salix miosinica
- †Salix misaotatewakii
- †Salix mixta Knowlton
- †Salix molesta
- †Salix moravica
- †Salix muraii
- †Salix myricoides Braun
- †Salix myrtifolia
- †Salix nereifolia
- †Salix nervillosa
- †Salix newberryana
- †Salix ninilchikensis
- †Salix nympharum
- †Salix ocoteifolia
- †Salix ovalis
- †Salix ovatior
- †Salix owyheeana
- †Salix pacifica
- †Salix palaeocaprea
- †Salix palaeopurpurea
- †Salix palaeorepens
- †Salix palibinii
- †Salix paradisensis
- †Salix parasachalinensis
- †Salix paucidentata
- †Salix paucinervis
- †Salix pelviga
- †Salix pentandra-miocenica
- †Salix perplexa
- †Salix perucensis
- †Salix picroides
- †Salix pilosula
- †Salix pitulosa
- †Salix plicata
- †Salix pliocaenica
- †Salix pliomaritima
- †Salix preobrajenskyi
- †Salix primaeva
- †Salix protogracilistyla
- †Salix protopaniculata
- †Salix protophylla
- †Salix pseudohaeyi
- †Salix purpuroides
- †Salix putivlensis
- †Salix raeana
- †Salix ramaleyi
- †Salix raritanensis
- †Salix remotidens
- †Salix retinenda
- †Salix retinervis
- †Salix rivularis Becker
- †Salix rosmariniformis
- †Salix rottensis
- †Salix rugosa
- †Salix samylinae
- †Salix sanzugawaensis
- †Salix sapindifolia
- †Salix schimperi
- †Salix schoenae
- †Salix semihausruckensis
- †Salix siouxiana
- †Salix socia
- †Salix spokanensis
- †Salix squamiformis
- †Salix stantonii
- †Salix stefanescui
- †Salix stipulata
- †Salix stupenda
- †Salix subaurita
- †Salix subrepens
- †Salix subtilis
- †Salix succorensis
- †Salix tabellaris
- †Salix takaminensis
- †Salix taxifolioides
- †Salix teilhardii
- †Salix tenera
- †Salix tongcheonensis
- †Salix trachytica
- †Salix triandroides
- †Salix tyonekana
- †Salix uglensis
- †Salix vaccinifolia
- †Salix varians
- †Salix vasseurii
- †Salix venosiuscula
- †Salix vimenoides
- †Salix viminalifolia
- †Salix vivianii
- †Salix volkana
- †Salix wahlbergii
- †Salix wildcatensis
- †Salix williamsii
- †Salix wimmeriana
- †Salix wyomingensis
