= Salix dalungensis =

Scientific classification
- Kingdom: Plantae
- Clade: Tracheophytes
- Clade: Angiosperms
- Clade: Eudicots
- Clade: Rosids
- Order: Malpighiales
- Family: Salicaceae
- Genus: Salix
- Species: S. dalungensis

Binomial name
- Salix dalungensis Z.Wang & P.Y.Fu

Tree in the genus of willows

Salix dalungensis is a small tree from the genus of willow (Salix) with mostly 4 to 5 centimeters long leaf blades. The natural range of the species is in Tibet.

== Description ==
Salix dalungensis grows as a tree up to 5 meters high . The twigs are initially dark purple, densely hairy and have protruding nodes . The leaves have up to 8 millimeters long, downy hairy petiole. The leaf blade is elliptical, 4 to 5 centimeters long and 1.4 to 2 centimeters wide. The leaf margin is entire, the leaf base is rounded or almost rounded, rarely wedge-shaped, the end of the leaf is blunt, almost rounded or rarely almost pointed. The upper side of the leaf is finely hairy or at least finely hairy along the veins. The underside is densely short and hairy silky.

Male inflorescences are not described. Female catkins are densely flowered, about 2 centimeters long and 3 millimeters in diameter. The peduncle is about 5 millimeters long and has two or three small leaves. The inflorescence axis is hairy shaggy. The bracts are elliptical to obovate, about 2 millimeters long, sparsely shaggy hairy or almost bare on the underside towards the rounded tip. Female flowers have a linear-elongated adaxial nectar gland, which reaches about a quarter to a third of the length of the bracts. The ovary is approximately 4 millimeters long, villous hairy and seated, the stylusis about 0.5 millimeters long and bilobed, the scar is split. Salix dalungensis flowers in June.

== Range ==
The natural range is in Tibet at an altitude of about 4400 meters. There the species grows on mountain slopes. It is also cultivated in various places.

== Taxonomy ==
Salix dalungensis is a species from the genus of willows ( Salix ) in the willow family (Salicaceae). There, it is the section Sclerophyllae assigned. It was first scientifically described in 1974 by Wang Zhan and Fu Pei Yun in the Acta Sinica Phytotaxonomica. No synonyms are known.
