= Salix boseensis =

Scientific classification
- Kingdom: Plantae
- Clade: Tracheophytes
- Clade: Angiosperms
- Clade: Eudicots
- Clade: Rosids
- Order: Malpighiales
- Family: Salicaceae
- Genus: Salix
- Species: S. boseensis

Binomial name
- Salix boseensis N.Chao

Shrub in the genus of willows

Salix boseensis is a shrub from the genus of willow (Salix) with initially brownish, frosted and bare branches and 6 to 9 centimeters long leaf blades. The natural range of the species is in China.

== Description ==
Salix boseensis forms shrubs with brownish, 4 to 5 millimeters in diameter, bare and frosted young twigs. The leaves have a stem up to 9 millimeters long. The remaining stipules are greenish, more or less elongated or ovate, 3 to 4 millimeters long, glabrous and have an irregularly serrated or toothed leaf margin. The leaf blade is oblong or obovate-oblong, 6 to 9 centimeters long and 2 to 3.5 millimeters wide, with a rounded or blunt tip, a wedge-shaped to more or less rounded base and a serrated, rarely almost entire, leaf margin. The upper side of the leaf is green, the underside greenish, both sides are bare. The approximately 12 lateral Pairs of nerves are protruding.

Male inflorescences are unknown. The female catkins grow on reddish-brown, bare, 4 to 5 centimeters long branches that can have leaves. They stand upright, are 7 to 10 millimeters long and have a stem about 1 centimeter long. The inflorescence axis is finely haired gray. The bracts are brown, irregularly ovate or oblong, 2 to 3 millimeters long, with a rounded or blunt tip, initially gray and shaggy hairy and later balding upper surface and bald underside. The female flowers have an adaxial nectar gland, an egg-shaped ovary, an undistinguished style and two small, flat, bald scars. Conical, egg-shaped capsules about 5 millimeters long are formed as fruits on 4 millimeter long stems. The fruits ripen in December.

== Range ==
The natural range is in the Chinese Autonomous Region of Guangxi.

== Taxonomy ==
Salix boseensis is a species from the genus of willow (Salix), in the family (Salicaceae). It is assigned to the Wilsonia section. It was described scientifically for the first time in 1984 by Neng Chao. The genus name Salix is Latin and has been from the Romans used for various willow species.

== Literature ==
- Wu Zheng-yi, Peter H. Raven (Ed.): Flora of China . Volume 4: Cycadaceae through Fagaceae . Science Press / Missouri Botanical Garden Press, Beijing / St. Louis 1999, ISBN 0-915279-70-3, pp. 171, 173 (English).
- Helmut Genaust: Etymological dictionary of botanical plant names. 3rd, completely revised and expanded edition. Nikol, Hamburg 2005, ISBN 3-937872-16-7, p. 552 (reprint from 1996).
