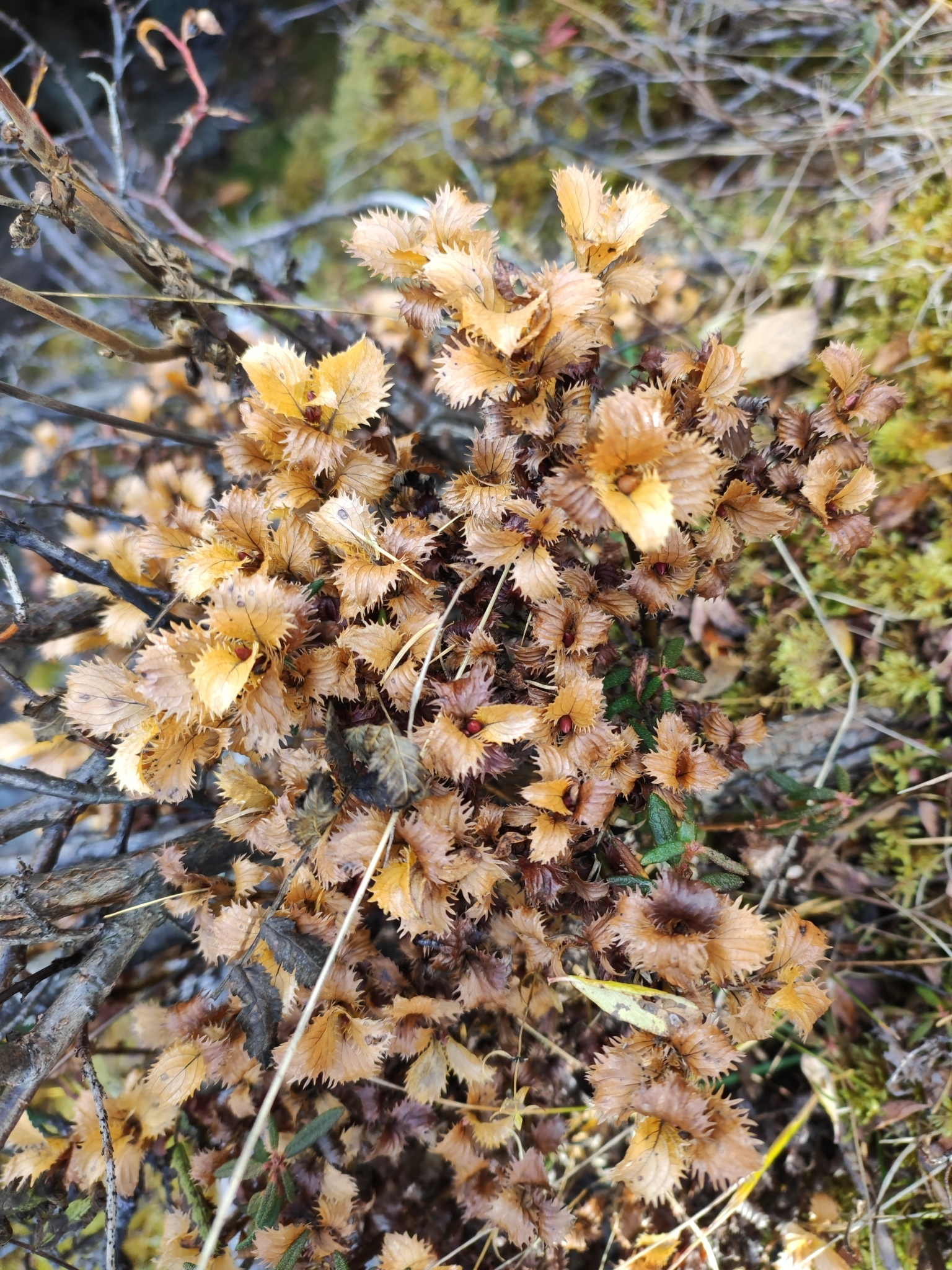

Scientific classification
- Kingdom: Plantae
- Clade: Tracheophytes
- Clade: Angiosperms
- Clade: Eudicots
- Clade: Rosids
- Order: Malpighiales
- Family: Salicaceae
- Genus: Salix
- Species: S. berberifolia

Binomial name
- Salix berberifolia Pall.

Subspecies
- S. berberifolia subsp. berberifolia; S. berberifolia subsp. brayi (Ledeb.) A.K.Skvortsov; S. berberifolia subsp. fimbriata A.K.Skvortsov; S. berberifolia subsp. kamtschatica A.K.Skvortsov; S. berberifolia subsp. kimurana (Miyabe & Tatew.) A.K.Skvortsov

Synonyms
- Salix brayi var. berberifolia (Pall.) Andersson

= Salix berberifolia =

Species of willow

Salix berberifolia is a species of willow which grows as a subshrub. It is native to Asia and grows in subalpine and subarctic habitats.
