= Salix donggouxianica =

Scientific classification
- Kingdom: Plantae
- Clade: Tracheophytes
- Clade: Angiosperms
- Clade: Eudicots
- Clade: Rosids
- Order: Malpighiales
- Family: Salicaceae
- Genus: Salix
- Species: S. donggouxianica

Binomial name
- Salix donggouxianica C.F.Fang (1984)

Shrub in the genus of willows

Salix donggouxianica is a shrub from the genus willow (Salix) with usually 3.5 to 4.5 centimeters long leaf blades. The natural range of the species is in the northeast of China.

== Description ==
Salix donggouxianica grows as a shrub up to 2 meters high with a gray-brown, smooth bark. The branches are thin, bare, yellowish and spotted black. Young twigs are yellow-green. The buds are egg-shaped and have brown-yellow, bare bud scales. The leaves have a 1.5 to 2 millimeter long, bare petiole. The leaf blade is linear-lanceolate, 3.5 to 4.5 centimeters long and 7 to 8 millimeters wide. The leaf margin is slightly blunt, the leaf base wedge-shaped, the leaf end pointed.

The male inflorescences are elongated to short petioles, 1 to 2 centimeters long and 6 to 7 millimeters in diameter catkins. The peduncle is short and has one or two scale-like, small leaves. The bracts are rust-red, inverted triangular, about 1 millimeter long, ciliate and shaggy hairy on the underside near the base. The end of the sheet is trimmed. Male flowers have a petiolate, about 0.3 millimeter long adaxial nectar gland. The stamenshave grown together, the individual stamens have shaggy hairs at the base, the anthers are red, egg-shaped and quadruple. The female catkins are round, 1 to 2.5 centimeters long and 3.5 to 5 millimeters in diameter. The bracts are spatulate, about 1.4 millimeters long and ciliate on the underside near the base. The end of the sheet is almost trimmed. Female flowers have a short, pedicled nectar gland about 0.4 millimeters long. The ovary is ovoid or elliptical, 1.2 to 1.5 millimeters long, pubescent and shortly stalked. One stylus is missing, the scar is lobed twice. Salix donggouxianica flowers in April, the fruits ripen in May.

== Range ==
The natural range is in the Chinese province of Liaoning in Donggou County. There the species grows in the coastal plains.

== Taxonomy ==
Salix donggouxianica is a kind from the kind of willow (Salix), in the family of the pasture plants (Salicaceae). There, it is the section Helix assigned. It was first described in 1984 by Fang Zhenfu in the Bulletin of Botanical Research. Synonyms of the species are not known.

== Literature ==
- Wu Zheng-yi, Peter H. Raven (Ed.): Flora of China. Volume 4: Cycadaceae through Fagaceae. Science Press / Missouri Botanical Garden Press, Beijing / St. Louis 1999, ISBN 0-915279-70-3, pp. 267, 272 (English).
