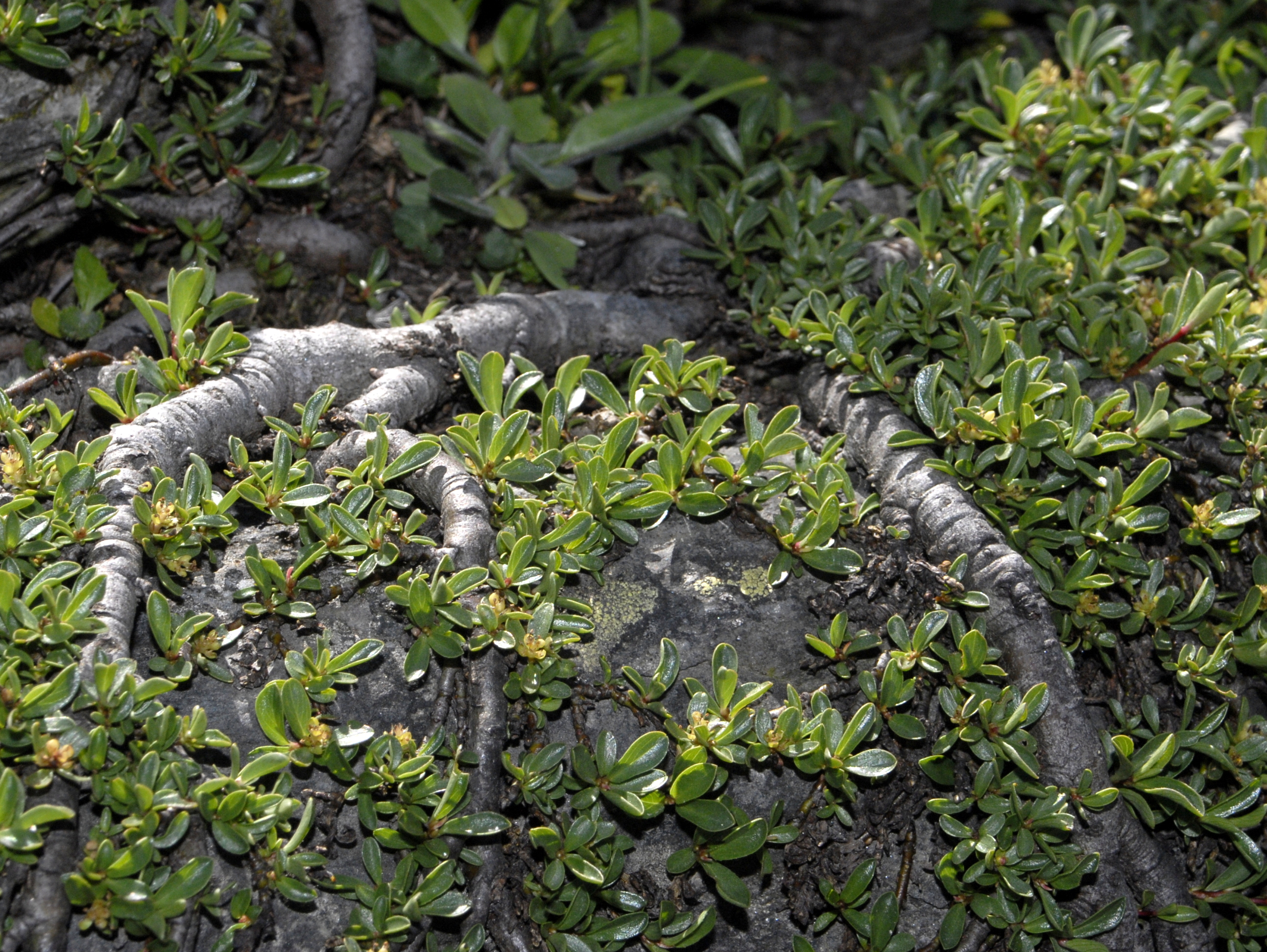
- Salix serpyllifolia at the Giardino Botanico Alpino Chanousia

Scientific classification
- Kingdom: Plantae
- Clade: Tracheophytes
- Clade: Angiosperms
- Clade: Eudicots
- Clade: Rosids
- Order: Malpighiales
- Family: Salicaceae
- Genus: Salix
- Species: S. serpillifolia

Binomial name
- Salix serpillifolia Scop.

Synonyms
- Salix retusa subsp. serpyllifolia (Scop.) Rouy; Salix retusa var. serpyllifolia (Scop.) Wahlenb.

= Salix serpillifolia =

Species of flowering plant

Salix serpillifolia or Salix serpyllifolia is a species of flowering plant in the family Salicaceae.

== Description ==
Salix serpillifolia, also known as thyme-leaved willow, can reach a height of 10–30 millimetres (0.39–1.18 in) and a length of about 20 centimetres (7.9 in). This plant develop woody, dark brown, longitudinally striated, creeping stems. The leaves are tiny, simple, subsessile, spathulate to obovate, without stipules. The upper side is glabrous, glossy dark green covered with a thin waxy layer. Like all willows this species is dioecious. Catkins appear after the leaves. They are about 5 mm long, with yellow anthers. Flowers bloom from May to August.

== Distribution ==
It is present in mountains of southern Europe, from the Iberian Peninsula, the Alps and the Balkans.

== Habitat ==
This species can be found in stony alpine turf, rock crevices and screes at elevation of 1,700–3,200 metres (5,600–10,500 ft) above sea level.

== Uses ==
Salix serpillifolia contains salicin, the source of salicylic acid in aspirin.
