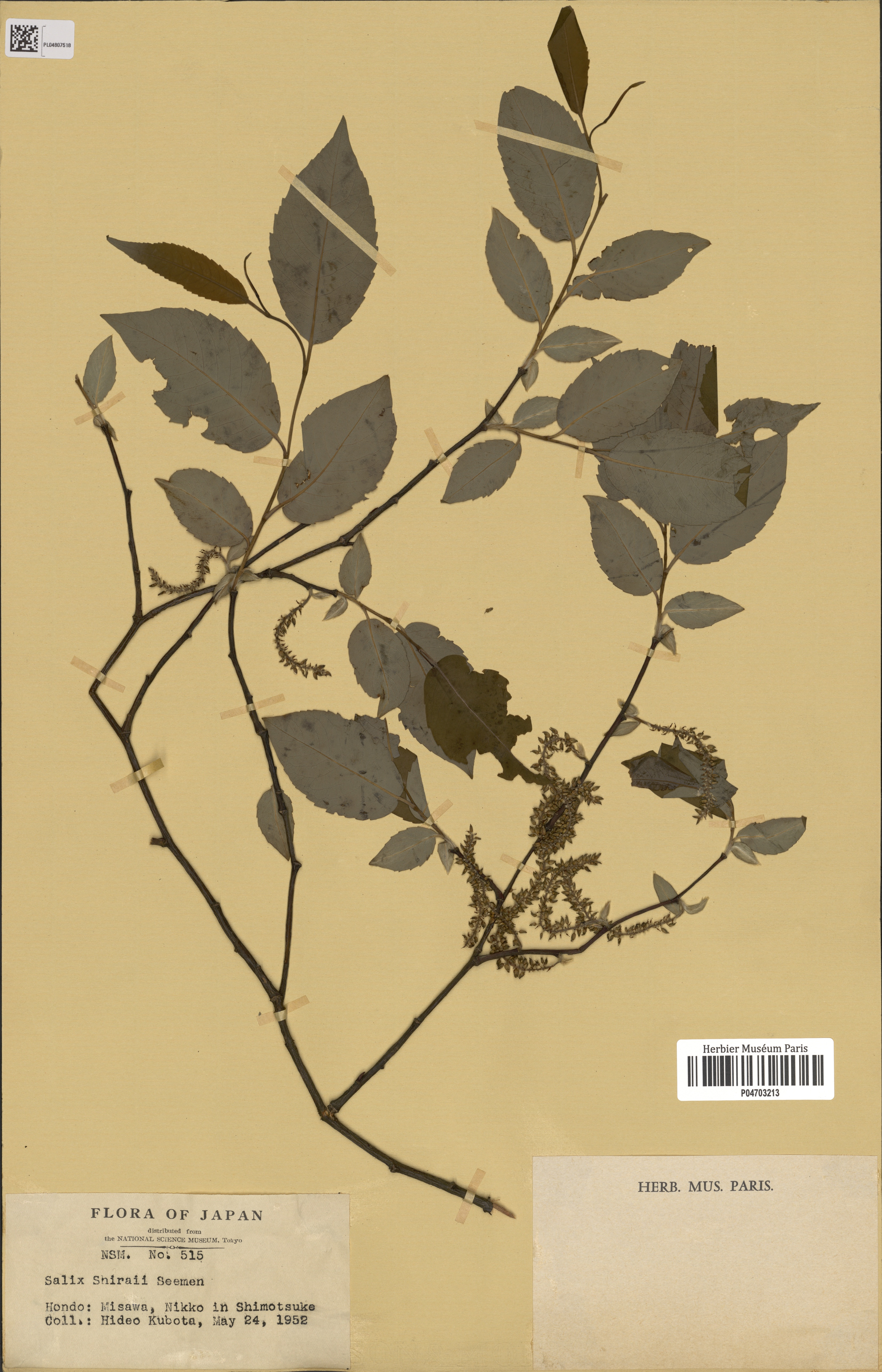

Scientific classification
- Kingdom: Plantae
- Clade: Tracheophytes
- Clade: Angiosperms
- Clade: Eudicots
- Clade: Rosids
- Order: Malpighiales
- Family: Salicaceae
- Genus: Salix
- Species: S. shiraii

Binomial name
- Salix shiraii Seemen.

= Salix shiraii =

Species of willow

Salix shiraii is a species of willow native to mountains of central Honshū, Japan. It is a deciduous shrub.
