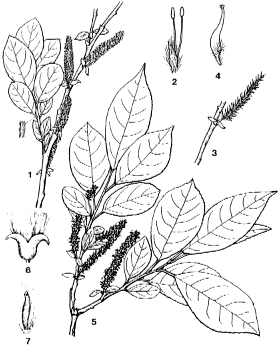

Scientific classification
- Kingdom: Plantae
- Clade: Tracheophytes
- Clade: Angiosperms
- Clade: Eudicots
- Clade: Rosids
- Order: Malpighiales
- Family: Salicaceae
- Genus: Salix
- Species: S. vulpina

Binomial name
- Salix vulpina Anderss.

= Salix vulpina =

Species of willow

Salix vulpina is a species of willow native to Hokkaido and the southern Kuril Islands. It is a deciduous shrub, reaching a height of 2 m.
