= Salix uralicola =

Scientific classification
- Kingdom: Plantae
- Clade: Tracheophytes
- Clade: Angiosperms
- Clade: Eudicots
- Clade: Rosids
- Order: Malpighiales
- Family: Salicaceae
- Genus: Salix
- Species: S. uralicola

Binomial name
- Salix uralicola IV Belyaeva

Plant in the genus of willows

Salix uralicola is a willow species described by I. V. Belyaeva. No subspecies are listed in the Catalog of Life.

== Range ==
It is found in Western Siberia and northern European Russia.
