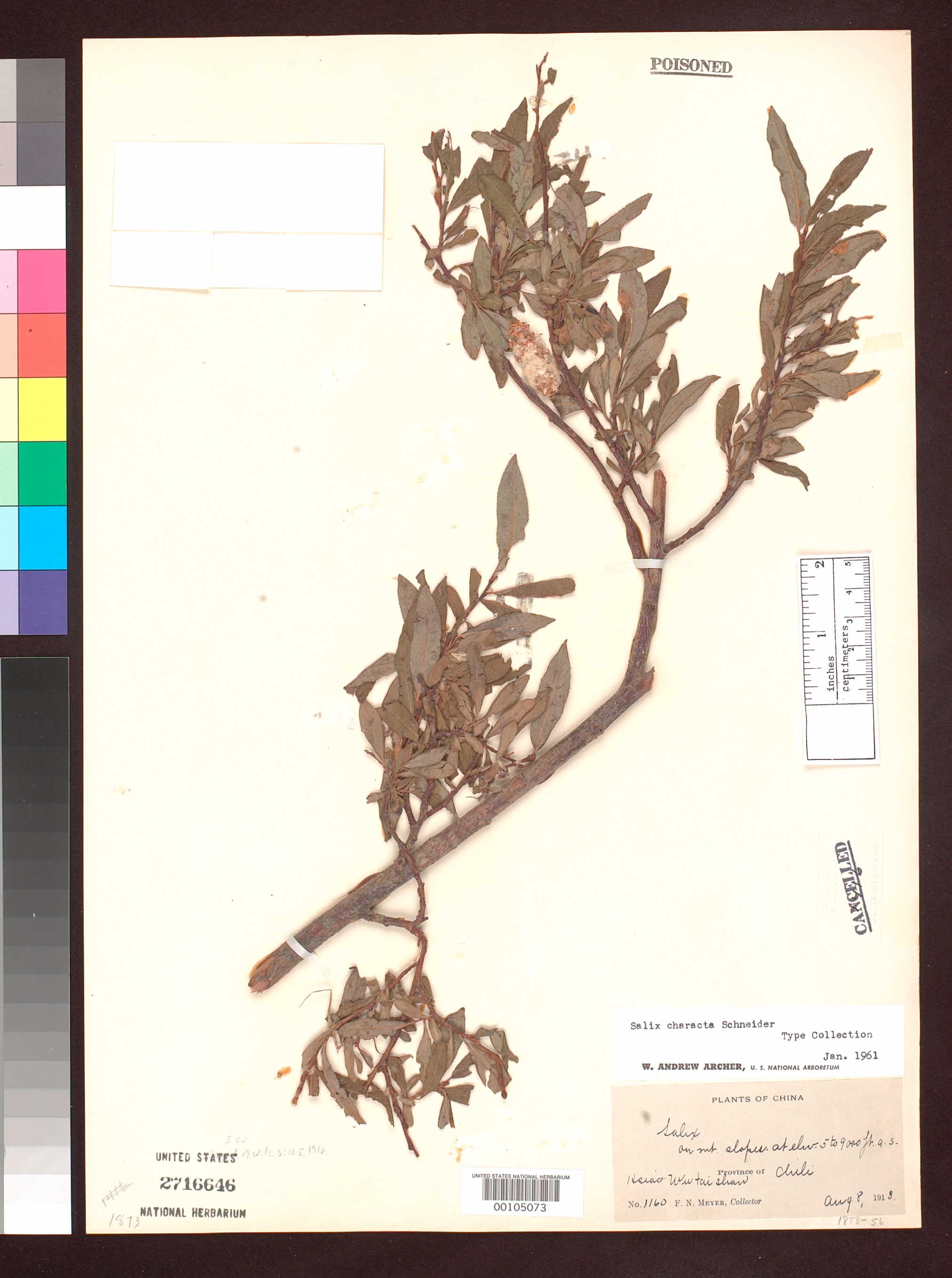

Scientific classification
- Kingdom: Plantae
- Clade: Tracheophytes
- Clade: Angiosperms
- Clade: Eudicots
- Clade: Rosids
- Order: Malpighiales
- Family: Salicaceae
- Genus: Salix
- Species: S. characta

Binomial name
- Salix characta C.K.Schneid.

= Salix characta =

Shrub in the genus of willows

Salix characta is a shrub from the genus of willow (Salix) with initially downy hairy branches. The leaf blades have lengths of 3.5 to sometimes 7 centimeters. The natural range of the species is in China.

== Description ==
Salix characta is a shrub with gray-yellowish-brown or red-brown, initially downy-haired branches. The buds are red-brown and egg-shaped. The leaves have a 1 to 3, rarely 4 millimeter long, shaggy stalk. The leaf blade is oblong-lanceolate, rarely elongated, 3.5 to rarely 7 centimeters long and 0.6 to 1 rarely 1.3 centimeters wide, pointed or rarely pointed, with a pointed or rarely almost blunt base and a serrate and rolled-up leaf margin. The top is green and fine downy, gray-green, the bottom and along the midrib shaggy hair.

The inflorescences are 1.5 to 2.5 centimeters long, dense-flowered, sitting or short-stalked catkins . The inflorescence axis is hairy down. The bracts are brown, elliptical, oblong or ovate, with a pointed or blunt tip and long downy hairs. Male flowers have an adaxial, linear or elongated nectar gland . The two stamens are bare. The female catkins are up to 4 inches long. Female flowers have an egg-shaped narrow at the base daunig hairy ovary on a fluff hairy stem. The stylusis lobed, about half the length of the ovary or shorter. The scar is short, entire or bilobed. The fruit forms 4 millimeter long, stalked capsules that are finely haired at the base. Salix characta flowers in May, the fruits ripen in June and July.

== Range ==
The natural range is in the Chinese provinces of Gansu, Hebei, in Inner Mongolia, in Qinghai, Shaanxi, and Shanxi on mountain slopes at altitudes of 2200 to 3200 meters.

== Taxonomy ==
Salix characta is a species from the genus of willows (Salix) in the willow family (Salicaceae). There, it is the section vimen assigned. It was described for the first time scientifically in 1916 by Camillo Karl Schneider. The genus name Salix is Latin and has been from the Romans used for various willow species.

== Literature ==
- Wu Zheng-yi, Peter H. Raven (Ed.): Flora of China . Volume 4: Cycadaceae through Fagaceae . Science Press / Missouri Botanical Garden Press, Beijing / St. Louis 1999, ISBN 0-915279-70-3, pp. 253, 254 (English).
- Helmut Genaust: Etymological dictionary of botanical plant names. 3rd, completely revised and expanded edition. Nikol, Hamburg 2005, ISBN 3-937872-16-7, p. 552 (reprint from 1996).
