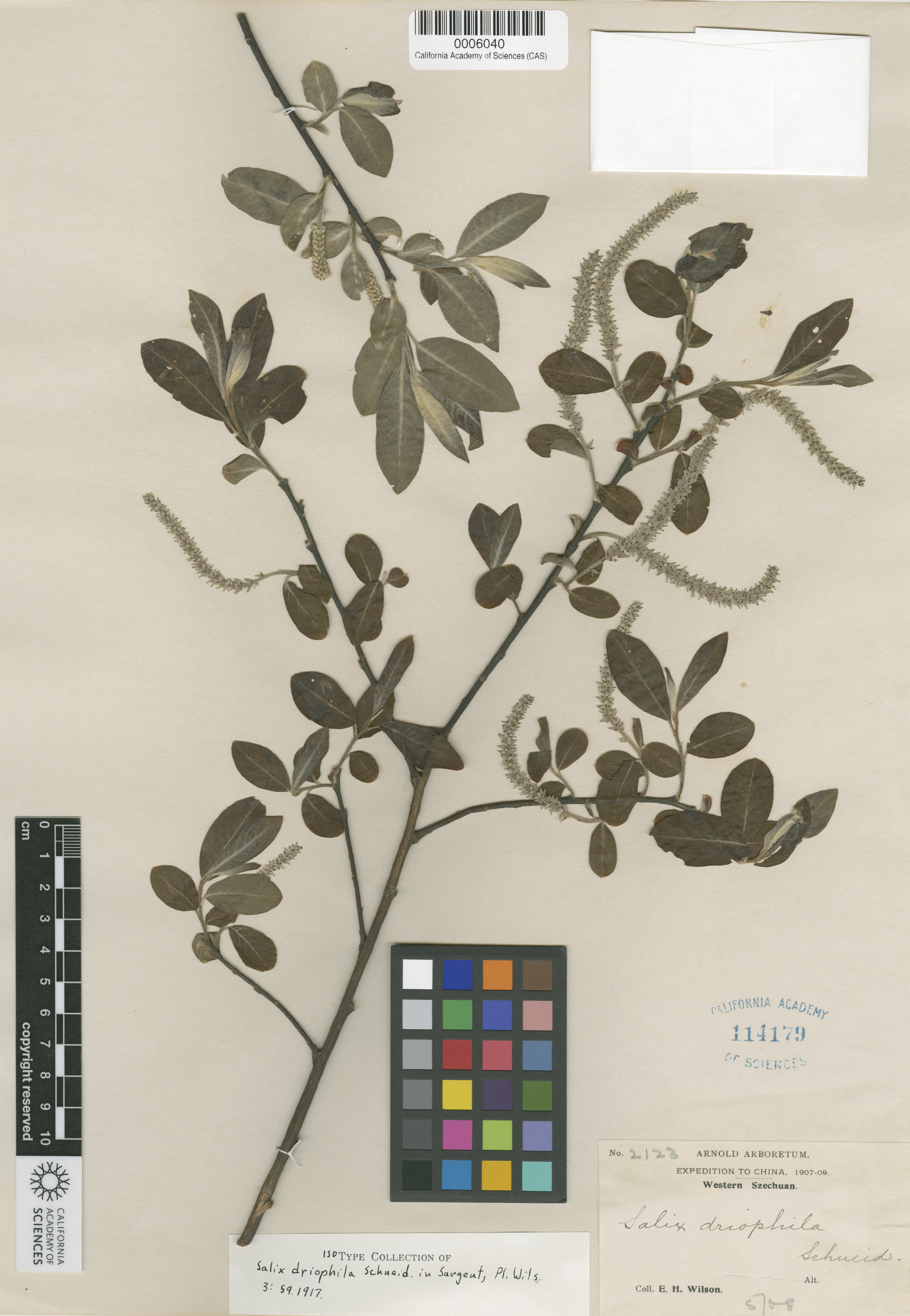

Scientific classification
- Kingdom: Plantae
- Clade: Tracheophytes
- Clade: Angiosperms
- Clade: Eudicots
- Clade: Rosids
- Order: Malpighiales
- Family: Salicaceae
- Genus: Salix
- Species: S. driophila

Binomial name
- Salix driophila C.K.Schneid.

= Salix driophila =

Shrub in the genus of willows

Salix driophila is a shrub from the genus of willow (Salix). The natural range of the species is in China.

== Description ==
Salix driophila grows as a shrub. The twigs are purple-brown or yellowish-brown, young twigs are purple-green and tomentose. The leaves are stalked. The leaf blade is elliptical, oblong or rounded. The leaf margin is entire, the end of the leaf blunt or pointed. The upper side of the leaf is green, hairy or almost bare, the underside is greenish and silky-tomentose or hairy down.

The male inflorescences are upright, from 2.5 and usually 4 to 4.5 centimeters long and 6 to 8 millimeters in diameter catkins. The peduncle is 1 to 2 centimeters long and has two to five small leaves. The bracts are obovate-oblong, about 1.5 millimeters long, curved, shaggy hairy and have a greenish, blunt end. Male flowers have an elongated-cylindrical, about 0.6 millimeter long, strong, adaxial nectar gland . The stamensare not grown together, 3.5 to 4 millimeters long and finely hairy at the base. The female catkins are up to 5.5 centimeters long. The bracts are round, about 1 millimeter long, shaggy hairy or glabrous on the upper side. Female flowers have an ovate-cylindrical, strong, adaxial nectar gland that is about the same length as the bracts. The ovary is ovoid, about twice as long as the bracts, sitting tight and white and daunig hairy. The stylus is formed clearly and bilobed, the scar is entire or split. The fruits are about 3 millimeters long, sedentary and finely hairy capsules. Salix driophilablooms with the leaves in May, the fruits also ripen in May.

== Range ==
The natural range is in the Chinese province of Sichuan, in the northwest of Yunnan, and in the east of Tibet. There the species grows on mountain slopes at altitudes of 2100 to 3100 meters.

== Taxonomy ==
Salix driophila is a species from the genus of willows (Salix) in the willow family (Salicaceae). There, it is the section Eriocladae assigned. It was described for the first time in 1916 by Camillo Karl Schneider in Plantae Wilsonianae. Synonyms of the species are not known.
