= Salix delavayana =

Scientific classification
- Kingdom: Plantae
- Clade: Tracheophytes
- Clade: Angiosperms
- Clade: Eudicots
- Clade: Rosids
- Order: Malpighiales
- Family: Salicaceae
- Genus: Salix
- Species: S. delavayana

Binomial name
- Salix delavayana Hand.-Mazz.

Shrub in the genus of willows

Salix delavayana is a shrub or small tree from the genus willow (Salix) with mostly 3 to 8 centimeters long leaf blades. The natural range of the species is in the south of China and in Tibet.

== Description ==
Salix delavayana grows as a shrub or a tree up to 6 meters high. The twigs are initially black-brown and downy hairy and later bald. The buds are brown and egg-shaped. The leaves have a petiole about 1 centimeter long. The leaf blade is oblong-elliptical to broadly elliptical, 3 to 8 centimeters long and 1 to 3 centimeters wide. The leaf margin is entire, the leaf base is wedge-shaped to rounded, the leaf end pointed or pointed. The upper side of the leaf is light green, the underside pale or frosted. Both sides are initially yellowish tomentose and later bald. In addition to the main vein, 7 to 14 pairs of lateral leaf veins are formed. The stipulesare narrow, obliquely egg-shaped and have a glandular serrated edge.

The male inflorescences are 2 to 4, rarely up to 5 centimeters long and about 7 millimeters in diameter catkins with a short or missing inflorescence stalk and a finely hairy inflorescence axis. The bracts are elongated-elliptical, finely hairy or hairless, more or less ciliate and colored brown towards the tip. Male flowers have a cylindrical adaxial and a slightly shorter abaxial nectar gland, which reach about a third of the length of the bracts and are sometimes lobed. The two stamensare separated from each other. The stamens are 2.3 to 3.5 millimeters long and shaggy at the top. The anthers of the flowers at the end of the catkins are colored red or yellow. The female catkins are 2 to 3 centimeters long and 4 to 6 millimeters in diameter. The peduncle has two to four small leaves. The bracts resemble those of the male catkins. Female flowers have an egg-shaped or short cylindrical adaxial nectar gland. The ovary is ovoid, sessile or shortly stalked, the stylus is clearly trained and bilobed, the scar is thick and also bilobed. The fruits are about 5 millimeters long capsules. Salix delavayana flowers with the leaves in April and May, the fruits ripen in June.

== Range ==
The natural range is in China in the west of the Sichuan Province, in the west of Yunnan, and in the east of the Tibet. There the species grows on mountain slopes, in forests along rivers, and in spruce forests at altitudes of 2800 to 4000 meters.

== Taxonomy ==
Salix delavayana is a species from the genus of willows (Salix) in the willow family (Salicaceae). There, it is the section Denticulatae assigned. It was first scientifically described in 1929 by the Austrian botanist Heinrich von Handel-Mazzetti in Symbolae Sinicae, Botanical results of the expedition of the Academy of Sciences in Vienna to Southwest China.

There are two varieties:

- Salix delavayana var. Delavayana with glabrous ovaries or ovaries that are hairy only at the base
- Salix delavayana var. Pilososuturalis Y. L. Chou & CF Muzzle with ovaries finely hairy on top and partially on the underside

== Literature ==
- Wu Zheng-yi, Peter H. Raven (Ed.): Flora of China. Volume 4: Cycadaceae through Fagaceae. Science Press / Missouri Botanical Garden Press, Beijing / St. Louis 1999, ISBN 0-915279-70-3, pp. 195, 203 (English).
