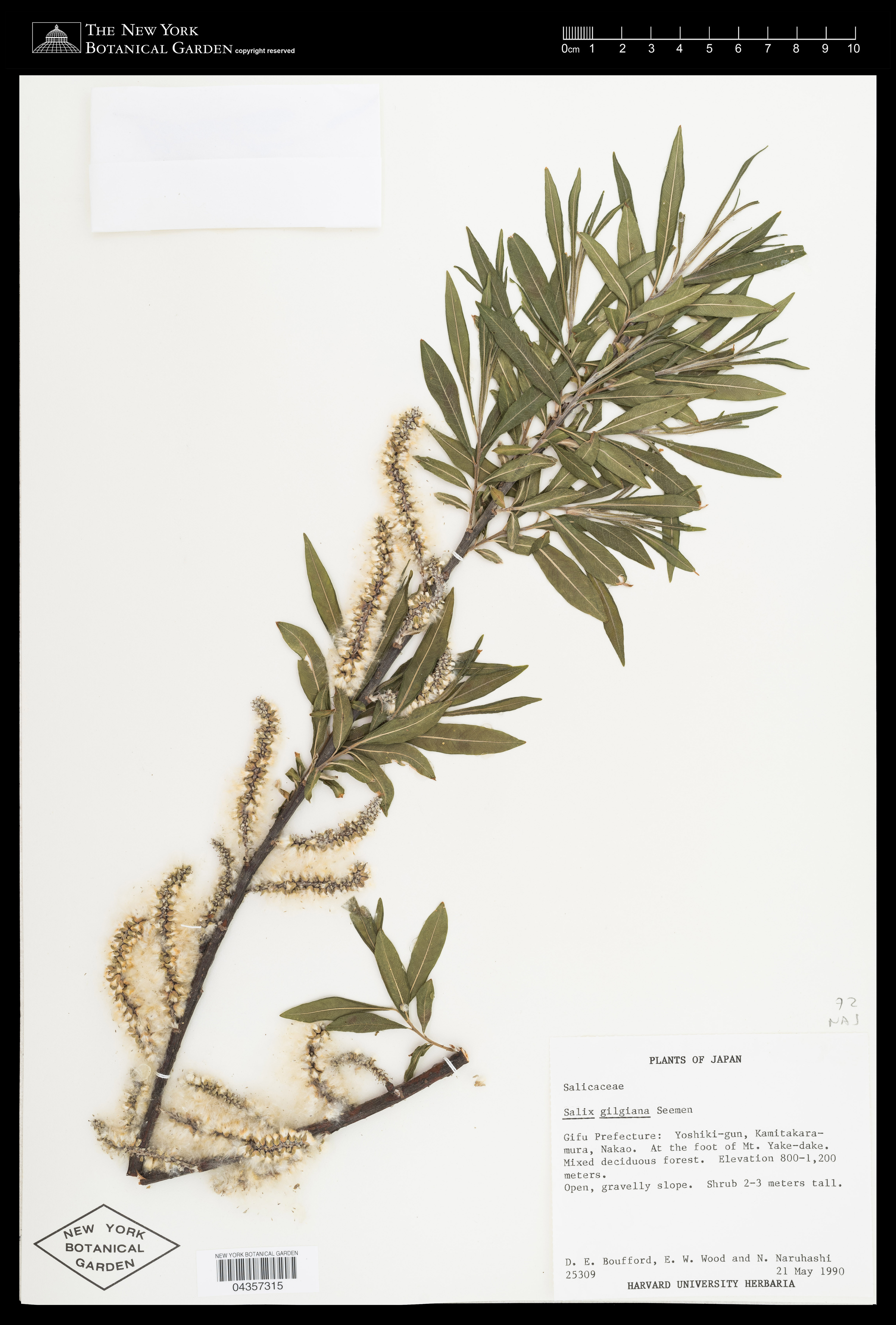

Scientific classification
- Kingdom: Plantae
- Clade: Tracheophytes
- Clade: Angiosperms
- Clade: Eudicots
- Clade: Rosids
- Order: Malpighiales
- Family: Salicaceae
- Genus: Salix
- Species: S. gilgiana

Binomial name
- Salix gilgiana Seemen.

= Salix gilgiana =

Species of willow

Salix gilgiana is a species of willow native to Japan and Korea. It is a deciduous shrub or small tree, reaching a height of 3–6 m.
