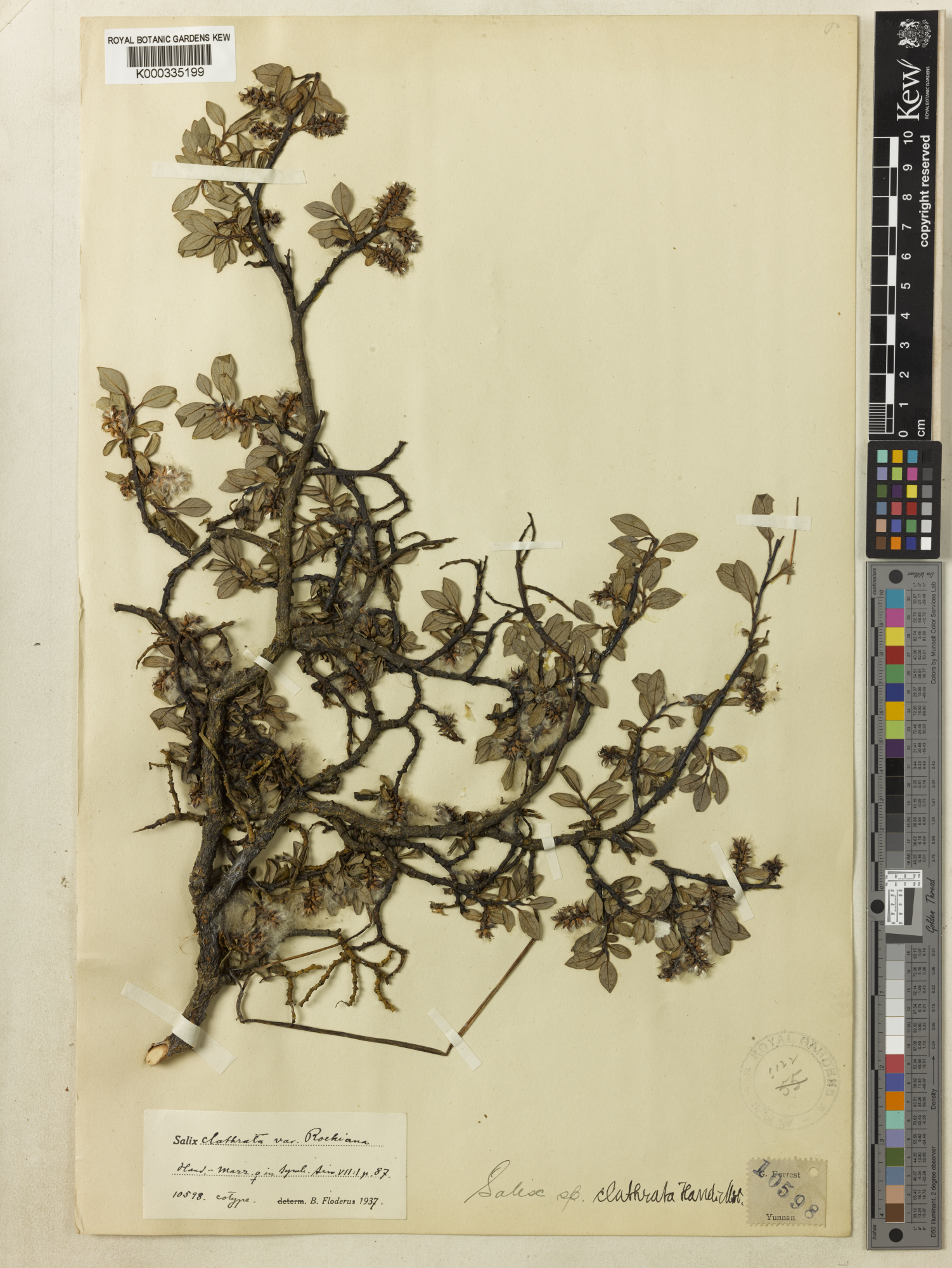

Scientific classification
- Kingdom: Plantae
- Clade: Tracheophytes
- Clade: Angiosperms
- Clade: Eudicots
- Clade: Rosids
- Order: Malpighiales
- Family: Salicaceae
- Genus: Salix
- Species: S. clathrata

Binomial name
- Salix clathrata Hand.-Mazz., 1929

= Salix clathrata =

Species of shrub

Salix clathrata is a prostrate shrub in the willow genus Salix with spread, heavily branched branches. The leaf blades have lengths of 1.5 to rarely 3 centimeters. The natural range of the species is in China.

== Taxonomy ==
The species is similar to Salix sclerophylla, and a classification in the section Sclerophyllae is also being considered. It was described by Heinrich von Handel-Mazzetti in 1929.

== Description ==
Salix clathrata is a prostrate shrub with spreading, non-rooting, thick and heavily branched, dull brown branches. Young twigs are red-brown, short, rough-haired and later balding. The buds are egg-shaped, about 3 millimeters long and sparsely hairy. The leaves have a red, 4 to rarely 7 millimeter long petiole. The leaf blade is leathery, elliptical or obovate, 1.5 to rarely 3 centimeters long and 1 to rarely 1.5 centimeters wide, entire, more or less rounded with an almost rounded base. The upper side of the leaf is light green, shiny, glabrous and wrinkled, the underside is white-gray and balding.

The inflorescences are ellipsoidal, about 6 millimeters long and 3 millimeters in diameter, dense-flowered catkins . The peduncle is very short and has two or three leaves. The inflorescence axis is thick and hairy. The bracts are purple towards the tip, obovate, and sparsely shaggy hairy on the underside and on the edge. Male flowers have a cylindrical adaxial and a broad and short abaxial nectar gland . The two stamensare about 3 millimeters long and shaggy at the base. The anthers are red. Female catkins are up to 2 inches long at fruit ripeness. Female flowers have a cylindrical adaxial gland. The ovary is egg-shaped, bald and sitting. The stylus is conspicuous and has two columns, the stigma bilobed. Salix clathrata flowers before the leaves shoot in July, the fruits ripen from August to September.

== Range ==
The natural range is in the west of the Chinese province of Sichuan, in the northwest of Yunnan, and in Tibet. Salix clathrata grows on rocky ground at heights of about 4000 meters.

== Literature ==
- Wu Zheng-yi, Peter H. Raven (Ed.): Flora of China . Volume 4: Cycadaceae through Fagaceae . Science Press / Missouri Botanical Garden Press, Beijing / St. Louis 1999, ISBN 0-915279-70-3, pp. 211, 215 (English).
