= Salix capusii =

Conservation status
- Least Concern (IUCN 3.1)

Scientific classification
- Kingdom: Plantae
- Clade: Tracheophytes
- Clade: Angiosperms
- Clade: Eudicots
- Clade: Rosids
- Order: Malpighiales
- Family: Salicaceae
- Genus: Salix
- Species: S. capusii

Binomial name
- Salix capusii Franch.

Shrub in the genus of willows

Salix capusii is a large shrub from the genus of the willow (Salix) with chestnut-brown branches and 4 to 5 centimeters long, gray-blue leaf blades. The natural range of the species is in Afghanistan, Tajikistan, Pakistan, and China.

== Description ==
Salix capusii is a shrub up to 6 meters high with a dull gray bark. The branches are maroon, thin and bare. Young twigs are yellowish and finely hairy. The leaves have linear and deciduous stipules . The petiole is 2 to 4 millimeters long, initially finely hairy and later balding. The leaf blade is linear-inverted-lanceolate or narrowly lanceolate, 4 to 5 centimeters long and about 6 millimeters wide, pointed to a short point, with a wedge-shaped base and a whole or serrated leaf margin. Both leaf sides are evenly gray-blue, initially tomentose and later balding.

The male inflorescences are 4 to 4.5 centimeters long and 6 to 8 millimeters in diameter, sitting or short-stalked catkins with a leafy base. The bracts are yellowish green, oblong to oblong-obovate, about half as long as the stamens, with an almost clipped tip, down-haired at the base and bare or sparsely shaggy-haired underside. The male flowers have two stamenswith overgrown stamens finely hairy at the base and yellow and round anthers. Female kittens are 1.5 to 2.5 inches long and grow even longer when the fruit is ripe. The stem is leafy. The bracts correspond to the male but are partially obsolete until the fruit is ripe. Female flowers have a narrow, conical, glabrous, 1 millimeter long stalked ovary. The stylus is short, the scar conspicuous. The fruits are greenish or yellowish, conical, 4 to 5 millimeter long capsules . Salix capusii blooms from April to May, the fruits ripen from May to June.

== Range ==
The natural range is in Afghanistan, Tajikistan, Pakistan and in the Chinese Xinjiang. The species grows in China at altitudes from 1,000 to 2,800 meters along mountain river valleys.

== Systematics ==
Salix capusii is a kind from the kind of willow ( Salix ), in the family of the pasture plants (Salicaceae). There, it is the section Helix assigned. It was in 1884 by Adrien René Franchet scientifically for the first time described. The genus name Salix is Latin and has been from the Romans used for various willow species.

Synonyms of the species are Salix coerulea E.L.Wolf and Salix niedzwieckii Goerz.

== Literature ==
- Wu Zheng-yi, Peter H. Raven (Hrsg.): Flora of China. Volume 4: Cycadaceae through Fagaceae. Science Press/Missouri Botanical Garden Press, Beijing/St. Louis 1999, ISBN 0-915279-70-3, S. 267, 269 (englisch).
- Helmut Genaust: Etymologisches Wörterbuch der botanischen Pflanzennamen. 3., vollständig überarbeitete und erweiterte Auflage. Nikol, Hamburg 2005, ISBN 3-937872-16-7, S. 552 (Nachdruck von 1996).
