= Salix blakii =

Scientific classification
- Kingdom: Plantae
- Clade: Tracheophytes
- Clade: Angiosperms
- Clade: Eudicots
- Clade: Rosids
- Order: Malpighiales
- Family: Salicaceae
- Genus: Salix
- Species: S. blakii

Binomial name
- Salix blakii Rudolf Goerz

Shrub in the genus of willows

Salix blakii is a willow (Salix) shrub with thin, brownish and bare branches and 4 to 8 centimeters long leaf blades. The natural range of the species extends from Southwest Asia to China.

== Description ==
Salix blakii is a shrub up to 5 meters high with thin, brownish and bare branches. The leaves are stalked. The leaf blade is linear or linear-lanceolate, 4 to 8 centimeters long and 4 to 5 millimeters wide, long and pointed, with a wedge-shaped base and entire or finely serrated leaf margin. The upper side of the leaf is dull green, the underside greenish, both sides are initially hairy and silky and later glabrous. The lateral pairs of nerves are only indistinctly developed.

Male inflorescences are unknown. The female catkins are 3 to 4 centimeters long and continue to elongate until the fruit is ripe. The inflorescence stalk is 5 to 10 millimeters long and has lanceolate leaves, the inflorescence axis is hairy gray-tomentose. The bracts are brownish, long obovate, glabrous underneath and down-haired at the base and edge. They have three leaf veins and can remain until the fruit is ripe. The female flowers have a conical, gray-tomentose hairy and partly almost bare, short-stalked ovary at the base . The stylus is about the same length as the two-column scar. Salix blakii flowers when the leaves shoot in April, the fruits ripen in May.

== Range ==
The natural range is in Iran, Afghanistan, Kazakhstan, Tajikistan, Uzbekistan and in the south of Xinjiang. In China it grows at heights of 500 to 600 meters.

== Taxonomy ==
Salix blakii is a kind from the kind of willow ( Salix ), in the family of the pasture plants (Salicaceae). There it is assigned to the Helix section. It was first scientifically described by Rudolf Goerz in 1934. The genus name Salix is Latin and has been from the Romans used for various willow species.
