= Salix bhutanensis =

Scientific classification
- Kingdom: Plantae
- Clade: Tracheophytes
- Clade: Angiosperms
- Clade: Eudicots
- Clade: Rosids
- Order: Malpighiales
- Family: Salicaceae
- Genus: Salix
- Species: S. bhutanensis

Binomial name
- Salix bhutanensis Flod.

Shrub in the genus of willows

Salix bhutanensis is a shrub or small tree from the genus of willow (Salix) found in Nepal, Bhutan, and Tibet. It has young, densely brownish green tomentose hairy branches and 3 to 5.5 centimeters long leaf blades.

== Description ==
Salix bhutanensis is a shrub or tree up to 3 meters high with spread branches. Young twigs are densely hairy, brownish-green, tomentose, biennial twigs are about 4 millimeters thick. The leaves have an approximately 3 millimeter long, densely hairy stalk. The stipules are ovate to lanceolate, finely hairy and have a serrated leaf margin. The leaf blade is 3 to 5.5 centimeters long and 1.5 to 2.5 centimeters wide, elliptical, pointed, entire, with a blunt or rounded base. Eight to 11 pairs of nerves are formed. The upper side of the leaf is yellowish green, the underside gray-green.

Male inflorescences are unknown. The female inflorescences are cylindrical, 5 centimeters long and 1.3 centimeters in diameter, dense-flowered catkins on a 1 centimeter long stalk with one to three leaves. The bracts are brown, ovate-lanceolate or lanceolate, about 1.8 millimeters long, dull brown on top and long hairy on the underside. The female flowers have an adaxial nectar gland. The ovary is stalked 0.3 to 1 millimeter long, narrow ovate-conical, 4 to 5 millimeters long, bare and upper side reddish. The stylus is 1 to 1.5 millimeters long or longer, the scaris more or less erect and two columns. The fruits are 6 to 7 millimeter long capsules. Salix bhutanensis flowers before or with the leaf shoots from May to June.

== Range ==
The natural distribution area is on mountain slopes, in valleys, thickets and open forests in Nepal, Bhutan, and Tibet at altitudes of 2800 to 3500 meters.

== Taxonomy ==
Salix bhutanensis is a species from the willow genus (Salix), in the family of Salicaceae. There it is assigned to the Lanatae section. It was described for the first time scientifically in 1940 by Björn Gustaf Oscar Floderus. The genus name Salix is Latin and has been from the Romans used for various willow species.

Synonyms of the species are Salix filistyla C. Wang & PY Fu and Salix himalayensis (Andersson) Floderus var. Filistyla (C. Wang & PY Fu) CF Fang.

== Literature ==
- Wu Zheng-yi, Peter H. Raven (Ed.): Flora of China. Volume 4: Cycadaceae through Fagaceae. Science Press / Missouri Botanical Garden Press, Beijing / St. Louis 1999, ISBN 0-915279-70-3, pp. 250, 251 (English).
- Helmut Genaust: Etymological dictionary of botanical plant names. 3rd, completely revised and expanded edition. Nikol, Hamburg 2005, ISBN 3-937872-16-7 (reprint from 1996).
