= Salix amplexicaulis =

Scientific classification
- Kingdom: Plantae
- Clade: Tracheophytes
- Clade: Angiosperms
- Clade: Eudicots
- Clade: Rosids
- Order: Malpighiales
- Family: Salicaceae
- Genus: Salix
- Species: S. amplexicaulis

Binomial name
- Salix amplexicaulis

Species of

Salix amplexicaulis is a species of
