= Salix divergentistyla =

Scientific classification
- Kingdom: Plantae
- Clade: Tracheophytes
- Clade: Angiosperms
- Clade: Eudicots
- Clade: Rosids
- Order: Malpighiales
- Family: Salicaceae
- Genus: Salix
- Species: S. divergentistyla

Binomial name
- Salix divergentistyla C.F.Fang

Tree in the genus of willows

Salix divergentistyla is a shrub or tree from the genus of willow (Salix) with mostly 3 to 4.5 centimeters long leaf blades. The natural range of the species is in Tibet.

== Description ==
Salix divergentistyla grows as a shrub or small tree. The branches are brownish red and bare. The leaves have a petiole about 6 millimeters long. The leaf blade is narrowly elliptical, 3 to 4.5 centimeters long and 1.3 to 1.6 centimeters wide. The leaf margin is whole, the leaf base and the leaf end are sharply pointed. The upper side of the leaf is green, glabrous and has sunken leaf veins, the underside is greenish, shaggy hairy, almost bald or bald and has a protruding central vein. Nine to twelve pairs of lateral leaf veins are formed.

Male inflorescences are unknown. The female catkins are 3.5 to 5.5 centimeters long and about 1 centimeter in diameter. The inflorescence stalk is long and has two or three small leaves, the inflorescence axis is hairy downy. The bracts are broadly elliptical or broadly elongated, about as long as the ovary and slightly ciliate. The end of the leaf is almost round, rounded, trimmed or edged. The underside is brown near the base, the upper side bare. Female flowers have an egg-shaped or rectangular, entire or divided adaxial nectar gland. The ovaryis ovate, about 2.5 millimeters long, hairy densely down and sessile. The stylus is long, almost completely divided and has halves standing apart. The scar is split. The fruits are about 5 millimeters long, finely hairy capsules.

== Range ==
The natural distribution area is in the east of Tibet in Zayü County. There the species grows on mountain slopes and in valleys at an altitude of about 3400 meters.

== Taxonomy ==
Salix divergentistyla is a kind from the kind of willow (Salix), in the family of the pasture plants (Salicaceae). There, it is the section Psilostigmatae assigned. It was first scientifically described in 1979 by Fang Zhenfu in the Acta Sinica Phytotaxonomica. No synonyms are known.

== Literature ==
- Wu Zheng-yi, Peter H. Raven (Ed.): Flora of China. Volume 4: Cycadaceae through Fagaceae. Science Press / Missouri Botanical Garden Press, Beijing / St. Louis 1999, ISBN 0-915279-70-3, pp. 226, 232 (English).
