= Salix chienii =

Scientific classification
- Kingdom: Plantae
- Clade: Tracheophytes
- Clade: Angiosperms
- Clade: Eudicots
- Clade: Rosids
- Order: Malpighiales
- Family: Salicaceae
- Genus: Salix
- Species: S. chienii

Binomial name
- Salix chienii W.C.Cheng, 1933

Shrub in the genus of willows

Salix chienii is a large shrub or small tree in the willow genus Salix with initially light green and tomentose hairy and later reddish brown and balding branches. The leaf blades have lengths of 2 to 3.5 sometimes 5.5 centimeters. The natural range of the species is in China.

== Description ==
Salix chienii is a shrub or tree up to 12 meters high with a dull brownish-gray bark . Young twigs are light green, tomentose and later turn reddish brown and almost bare. The buds are hairy and have a blunt tip. The leaveshave an approximately 1 millimeter long, silky hairy petiole. The leaf blade is long, elliptical, lanceolate, or obsolete, 2 to 3.5, rarely 5.5 centimeters long and 0.5 to 1.1, rarely 1.3 centimeters wide, with a pointed or blunt tip, broadly wedge-shaped to almost round Base and glandular serrated leaf margin. Both sides are initially silky down-haired, the upper side is green, bald or almost bald, the underside is pale, silky hairy or rarely bald or almost bald. Eight to twelve pairs of nerves are formed.

The male inflorescences are cylindrical, catkins 1.5 to 2 centimeters long . The inflorescence stalk is 3 to 6 millimeters long and has three to seven leaves. The bracts are obovate, hairy with long fluffy hairs, with a blunt or almost rounded tip. Male flowers have two stamens that have grown together and are finely haired at the base with yellow anthers. Female catkins are 1.2 to 1.8 centimeters long and reach 2 to 4 centimeters in length when the fruit is ripe. The peduncle is short and has three to five leaves at the base. The bracts are ovate, ciliate, glabrous on both sides, with a blunt or rounded base. Female flowers have oneadaxial nectar gland . The ovary is ovoid, about 2 millimeters long, bare and sitting. The stylus is striking the scar bilobed. When fruits are ovate-oblong, about 3 mm long capsules formed. Salix chienii flowers in April, the fruits ripen in May.

== Range ==
The natural range is in the Chinese provinces of Anhui, Fujian, Hubei, Hunan, Jiangsu, Jiangxi, and Zhejiang. Salix chienii grows along rivers and in thickets at heights of 500 to 600 meters.

== Taxonomy ==
The species was described in 1933 by Wan Chun Cheng.

There are two varieties:

- Salix chienii var. Chienii : The female flowers have bald ovaries.
- Salix chienii var. Pubigera N.Chao The female flowers have close fluffy hairy ovary. The distribution area is in the Chinese province of Hunan.

== Literature ==
- Wu Zheng-yi, Peter H. Raven (Ed.): Flora of China . Volume 4: Cycadaceae through Fagaceae . Science Press / Missouri Botanical Garden Press, Beijing / St. Louis 1999, ISBN 0-915279-70-3, pp. 181, 186 (English).
