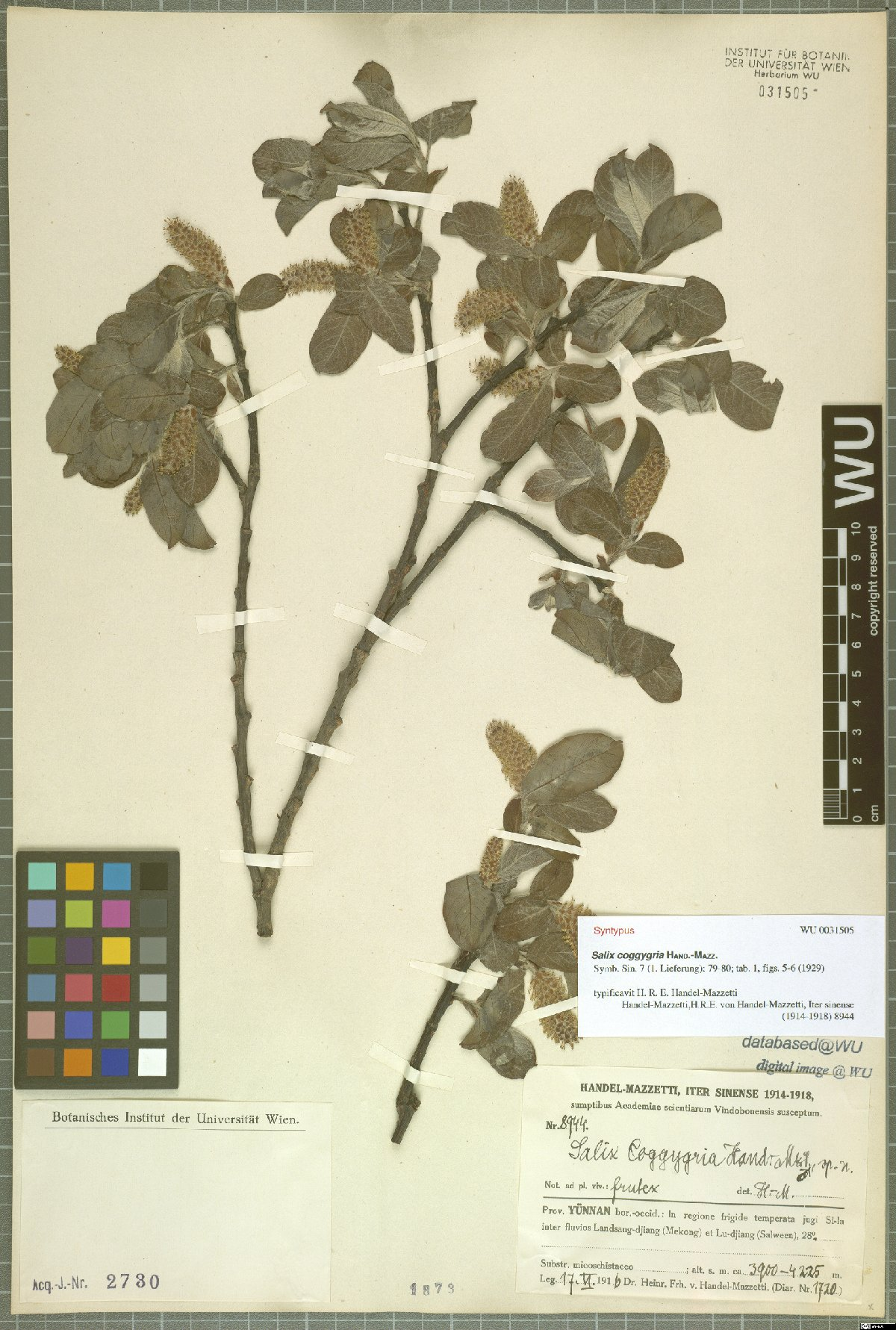

Scientific classification
- Kingdom: Plantae
- Clade: Tracheophytes
- Clade: Angiosperms
- Clade: Eudicots
- Clade: Rosids
- Order: Malpighiales
- Family: Salicaceae
- Genus: Salix
- Species: S. coggygria

Binomial name
- Salix coggygria Hand.-Mazz.

= Salix coggygria =

Species of shrub

Salix coggygria is a low shrub in the willow genus Salix with 1.5 to 4.5 centimeter-long leaf blades. The natural range of the species is in China.

== Taxonomy ==
The species was described in 1929 by Heinrich von Handel-Mazzetti in Symbolae Sinicae, Botanical results of the expedition of the Academy of Sciences in Vienna to Southwest China.

== Description ==
Salix coggygria is a low shrub up to 50 centimeters high . The twigs are dull brown and hairless. However, young shoots are hairy gray or brownish. The buds are brown, egg-shaped and 4 to 7 millimeters long. The leaves have triangular-oval and finely hairy stipules . The petiole is 2 to 5 millimeters long and densely hairy. The leaf blade is obovate-rounded, 1.5 to 4.5 inches long and 1.5 to 3.5 inches wide, with entire margins or slightly serrate near the tip. The base of the leaf is blunt-rounded, the tip is also blunt-rounded and often spiky. The upper side of the leaf is green and densely hairy, the underside pale and glaucousand in young leaves dense, shaggy and hairy white and later balding.

The inflorescences are terminal, 2 to 3 centimeters long, dense-flowered catkins with a leafy base. The inflorescence axis is hairy tomentose. The bracts are obovate-oblong, about 3 millimeters long, finely hairy, and have a blunt or more or less truncated tip. Male flowers have cylindrical, adaxial, and abaxial nectar glands. The two stamens are about 6 millimeters long. The stamens are finely haired near the base, the anthers are egg-shaped and yellow. Female flowers have an egg-shaped, densely whitish gray haired, sitting ovary. The stylushas two columns, the scar has two lobes. Salix coggygria flowers when the leaves shoot in June, the fruits ripen in July.

== Range ==
The natural range is in the northwest of the Chinese province of Yunnan and in the east of Tibet. Salix coggygria grows among other shrubs at heights of 3400 to 4700 meters.

== Literature ==
- Wu Zheng-yi, Peter H. Raven (Ed.): Flora of China . Volume 4: Cycadaceae through Fagaceae . Science Press / Missouri Botanical Garden Press, Beijing / St. Louis 1999, ISBN 0-915279-70-3, pp. 206, 210 (English).
