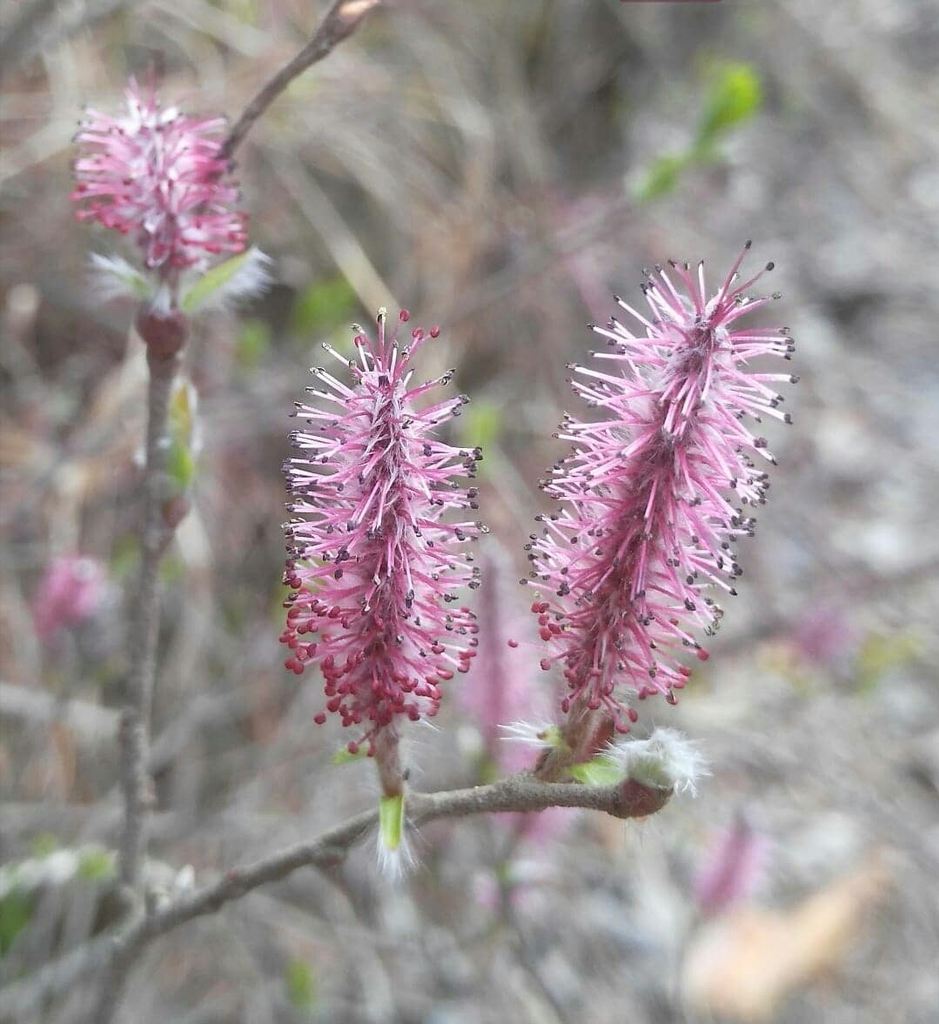

Scientific classification
- Kingdom: Plantae
- Clade: Tracheophytes
- Clade: Angiosperms
- Clade: Eudicots
- Clade: Rosids
- Order: Malpighiales
- Family: Salicaceae
- Genus: Salix
- Species: S. saxatilis

Binomial name
- Salix saxatilis Turcz.

= Salix saxatilis =

Species of willow

Salix saxatilis is a willow species described by Porphir Kiril Nicolai Stepanowitsch Turczaninow.

== Range ==
It is present in central Siberia, the Russian Far East (including Sakhalin), and Mongolia.
