= Salix atopantha =

Scientific classification
- Kingdom: Plantae
- Clade: Tracheophytes
- Clade: Angiosperms
- Clade: Eudicots
- Clade: Rosids
- Order: Malpighiales
- Family: Salicaceae
- Genus: Salix
- Species: S. atopantha

Binomial name
- Salix atopantha C.K.Schneider

Shrub in the genus of willows

Salix atopantha is a small shrub from the genus of the willow (Salix) with up to 4 centimeters long, dull brown leaf blades on top. The natural range of the species is in China.

== Description ==
Salix atopantha is a 1 to 2 meter high shrub with black-red or yellowish-red branches that are initially finely haired and later bald. The leaves have a 2 to 6 millimeter long stem. The leaf blade is 1.5 to 2.5, rarely 4 centimeters long, 0.5 to 1 centimeter wide, elliptical-oblong, oblong or rarely lanceolate, with a pointed or blunt tip, wedge-shaped to rounded base and a serrate and indistinctly glandular leaf margin. The upper side of the leaf is matt brown, initially hairy and later balding, the underside is whitish and glabrous. Six to seven pairs of nerves are formed. Fallen leaves turn rusty brown.

The male inflorescences are 1.5 to 2 centimeters long, 5 to 6 millimeters in diameter, elongated catkins. The peduncle is 4 to 10 millimeters long and has three to four leaflets. The bracts are a third to half as long as the stamens. They have a rounded, truncated or irregularly flat notched tip. Male flowers have two mostly cylindrical nectar glands. The two stamens have almost completely shaggy hairy stamens and yellow or partly red, round anthers. The female inflorescences have dark red-brown, obovate or elliptical, woolly hairy on the underside and almost bald on the top Bracts with indistinctly notched leaf margin and rounded tip. Female flowers have a two- to three-fold lobed, adaxially located nectar gland and sometimes another small, abaxially located nectar gland. The ovary is egg-shaped, sitting and woolly. The stylus and stigma are red. Salix atopantha flowers when the leaves shoot in June, the fruits ripen in July.

== Range ==
The natural range is on mountain slopes, in valleys and along rivers at an altitude of 2900 to 4100 meters in the south of the Chinese province of Gansu, in the south-east of Qinghai, in the north-west of Sichuan, and in the east of Tibet.

== Taxonomy ==
Salix atopantha is a species from the genus of willows (Salix) in the willow family (Salicaceae). There it is assigned to the Sclerophyllae section. It was described scientifically for the first time in 1916 by Camillo Karl Schneider scientifically for the first time described. The genus name Salix is Latin and has been from the Romans used for various willow species.

There are two varieties:

- Salix atopantha var. Atopantha : The female flowers have a sessile ovary.
- Salix atopantha var. Pedicellata C.F. Fang & JQWang : The female flowers have a 0.2 millimeter long stalked ovary. The distribution area is at an altitude of about 2900 meters in the south of Gansu.

== Literature ==
- Wu Zheng-yi, Peter H. Raven (Ed.): Flora of China. Volume 4: Cycadaceae through Fagaceae. Science Press / Missouri Botanical Garden Press, Beijing / St. Louis 1999, ISBN 0-915279-70-3, pp. 218, 222, 223 (English).
- Helmut Genaust: Etymological dictionary of botanical plant names. 3rd, completely revised and expanded edition. Nikol, Hamburg 2005, ISBN 3-937872-16-7 (reprint from 1996).
