= Salix dissa =

Scientific classification
- Kingdom: Plantae
- Clade: Tracheophytes
- Clade: Angiosperms
- Clade: Eudicots
- Clade: Rosids
- Order: Malpighiales
- Family: Salicaceae
- Genus: Salix
- Species: S. dissa

Binomial name
- Salix dissa C.K.Schneid.

Shrub in the genus of willows

Salix dissa is a low shrub from the genus willow (Salix) with usually 1 to 3 centimeters long leaf blades. The natural range of the species is in China.

== Description ==
Salix dissa grows as a shrub up to 1 meter high. The branches are spread out, they are short and thin, initially yellow to yellowish brown, finely haired or glabrous. The leaves have a short petiole. The leaf blade is oblong, oblong-ovate to oblong-elliptical, rarely oblong-lanceolate, 1 to 3, rarely to 4 centimeters long and 0.5 to 1.8 centimeters wide. The leaf margin is entire, the leaf base rounded, almost heart-shaped on young shoots, the leaf end pointed or blunt. The upper side of the leaf is yellowish green, rarely matt green, the underside whitish. Stipules are missing.

The male inflorescences are 2 to 4 centimeters long and 5 to 7 millimeters in diameter catkins. The inflorescence stalk is about 1 centimeter long and has three small leaves, the inflorescence axis is finely hairy. The bracts are colored brown towards the tip, broadly ovate or rounded and glabrous. Male flowers have an adaxial or an adaxial and an abaxial nectar gland. There will be two detached stamensformed, the stamens are hairy down near the base, the anthers are yellow and rounded. The female catkins are thin, 1.5 to 3 centimeters long and 2 to 4 millimeters in diameter. The inflorescence stalk is up to 2.5 centimeters long when the fruit is ripe and has three to 5 small leaves. The bracts resemble those of the male catkins. Female flowers have an egg-shaped adaxial nectar gland that is sometimes divided. The ovary is egg-shaped, bald and sitting, the stylus is short, the scar bilobed. The fruits are about 4 millimeters long, oval-elongated capsules. Salix dissa flowers with the leaf shoots early in May, the fruits ripen in June.

== Range ==
The natural range is in the south of the Chinese province of Gansu, in the west of Sichuan, and in the northwest of Yunnan. The species grows near rivers, in open places, and on mountain slopes at altitudes of 900 to 3000 meters.

== Taxonomy ==
Salix dissa is a species from the genus of willows (Salix) in the willow family (Salicaceae). There, it is the section Denticulatae assigned. It was first scientifically described in 1916 by Camillo Karl Schneider in Plantae Wilsonianae.

There are two varieties:

- Salix dissa var. Cereifolia (Goerz ex Rehder & Kobuski) CFFang : Male flowers have only one adaxial nectar gland.
- Salix dissa var. Dissa: Male flowers have an adaxial and an abaxial nectar gland. [1]

== Literature ==
- Wu Zheng-yi, Peter H. Raven (Ed.): Flora of China. Volume 4: Cycadaceae through Fagaceae. Science Press / Missouri Botanical Garden Press, Beijing / St. Louis 1999, ISBN 0-915279-70-3, pp. 195, 200 (English).
