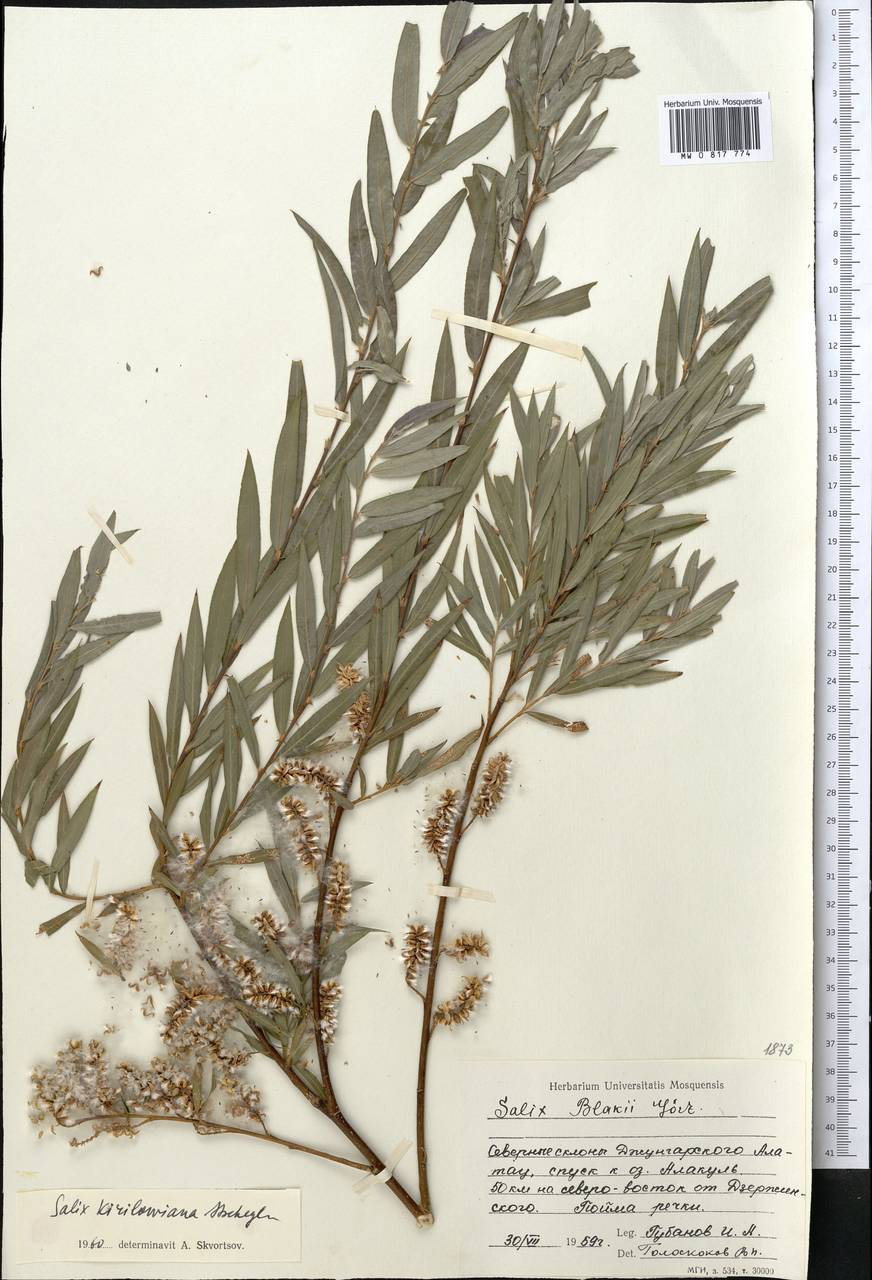

Scientific classification
- Kingdom: Plantae
- Clade: Tracheophytes
- Clade: Angiosperms
- Clade: Eudicots
- Clade: Rosids
- Order: Malpighiales
- Family: Salicaceae
- Genus: Salix
- Species: S. kirilowiana

Binomial name
- Salix kirilowiana Stschegl.

= Salix kirilowiana =

Species of willow

Salix kirilowiana is a willow species described by Sergei Sergeyevich Sheglejev. Salix kirilowiana is part of the genus Salix, and the family Salicaceae. No subspecies are listed in the Catalog of Life.

== Range ==
It is found in mountain river valleys, especially on pebbles and gravelly alluvium; below 2500 m. in Xinjiang in the Tian Shan mountains.
