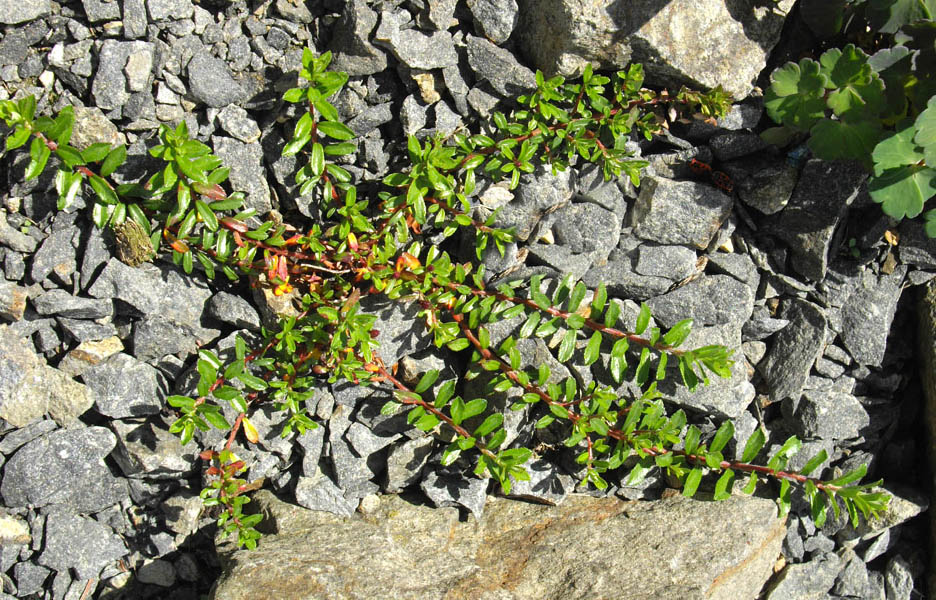
- Habit

Scientific classification
- Kingdom: Plantae
- Clade: Embryophytes
- Clade: Tracheophytes
- Clade: Spermatophytes
- Clade: Angiosperms
- Clade: Eudicots
- Clade: Rosids
- Order: Malpighiales
- Family: Salicaceae
- Genus: Salix
- Species: S. lindleyana

Binomial name
- Salix lindleyana Wall. ex Andersson

Synonyms
- List: Salix acuminatomicrophylla K.S.Hao; Salix acuminatomicrophylla K.S.Hao ex C.F.Fang & A.K.Skvortsov; Salix brachista C.K.Schneid.; Salix brachista var. integra C.Wang & C.F.Fang; Salix brachista var. pilifera N.Chao; Salix clavata Wall.; Salix crenata K.S.Hao; Salix crenata K.S.Hao ex C.F.Fang & A.K.Skvortsov; Salix ovatomicrophylla K.S.Hao ex C.F.Fang & A.K.Skvortsov; Salix pominica Z.Wang & P.Y.Fu; Salix souliei Seemen

= Salix lindleyana =

Species of flowering plant

Salix lindleyana, the creeping Himalayan willow, is a species of willow in the family Salicaceae, found in the Himalayas, from northeast Pakistan to Yunnan in China.

== Description ==
Salix lindleyana is a cushion-shaped shrub. The trunk is dull brown, short, twisted and can take root. The twigs are yellowish-brown, young twigs are short but very densely arranged. Young shoots are sparsely hairy and later balding. The vegetative buds are egg-shaped, small and hairless. The leaves grow close together and cover the branches. The petiole is about 4 millimeters long. The leathery leaf blade is ovate, about 8 millimeters long and usually 3.5, rarely up to 5 millimeters wide. The leaf margin is loosely but regularly serrated in a glandular manner, the leaf base is wedge-shaped, the tip rounded. The upper side of the leaf is green, shiny, glabrous and wrinkled, the underside is greenish and initially shaggy with hair. The central rib is sunk on the top and raised on the bottom.

Very small catkins are formed as inflorescences from around five flowers. The bracts are yellowish green, obovate, membranous, and hairy on the upper side near the base along the leaf margin. The tip of the leaf is rounded. Male flowers have a cylindrical nectar gland adaxially and abaxially, the abaxial gland is thinner and sometimes bilobed. The two stamens are about 3.5 millimeters long and thus about 3 times longer than the bracts. The stamens are hairy at the base, the anthers are yellow. Female flowers have an adaxially lying, cylindrical nectar gland. The ovary is cylindrical, about 3 millimeters long, stalked long and about the same length as the bracts. The pen is short and two-piece, the scar is bilobed. The capsule fruits are long ovate. Salix crenata flowers in July, the fruits ripen in August and September.

== Subtaxa ==
The following forms are currently accepted:

- Salix lindleyana f. hebecarpa Kimura
- Salix lindleyana f. lindleyana
