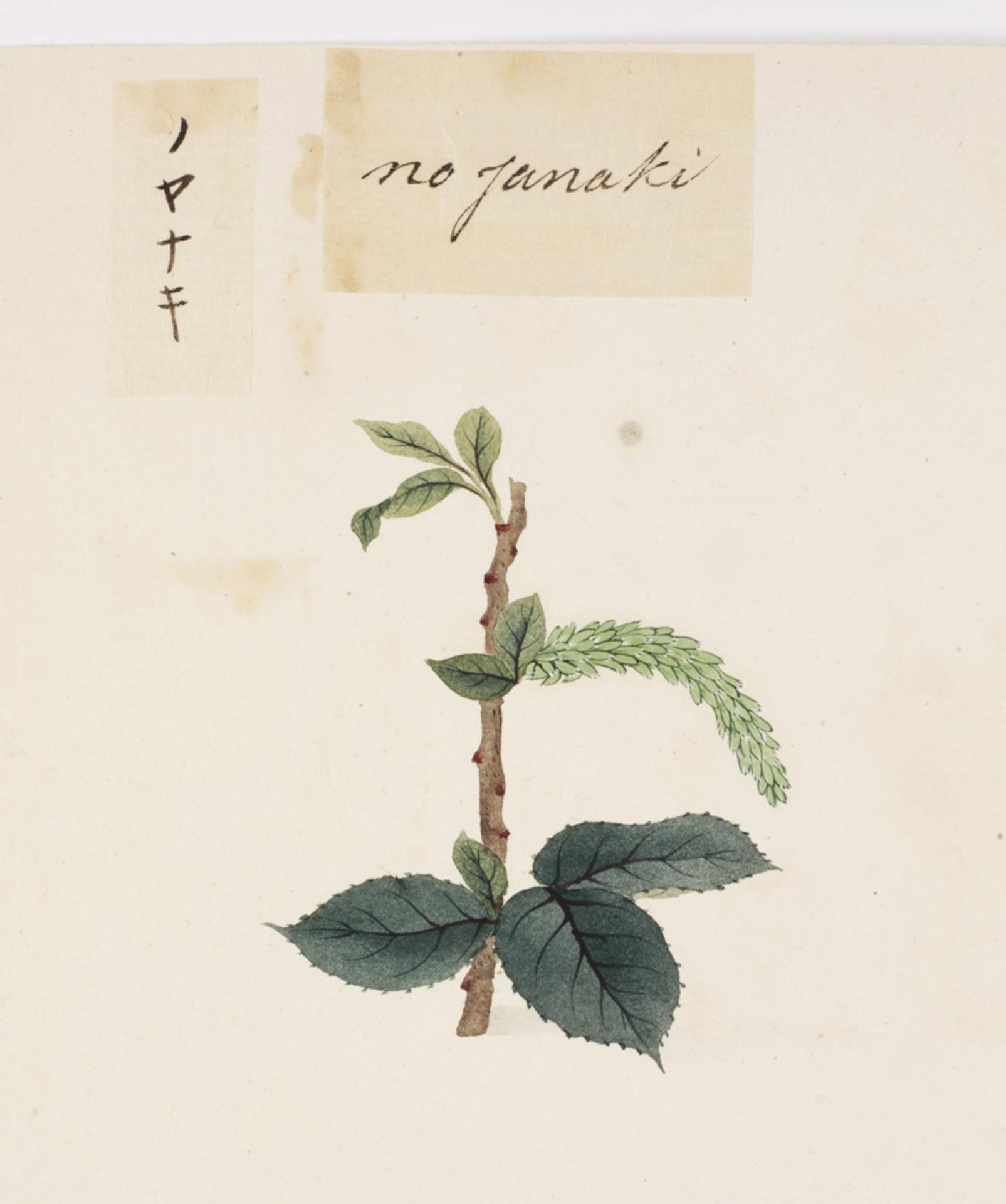
- Drawing of a Salix subopposita

Scientific classification
- Kingdom: Plantae
- Clade: Tracheophytes
- Clade: Angiosperms
- Clade: Eudicots
- Clade: Rosids
- Order: Malpighiales
- Family: Salicaceae
- Genus: Salix
- Species: S. subopposita

Binomial name
- Salix subopposita Miq.

= Salix subopposita =

Species of willow

Salix subopposita (Japanese: ノヤナギ, romanized: Noyanagi), also known as the opposite-leaved willow, is a species of willow native to southern Japan and Jeju Island in South Korea. It is a deciduous small shrub with a maximum height of 0.5 meters.
