= Salix calcicola =

Scientific classification
- Kingdom: Plantae
- Clade: Tracheophytes
- Clade: Angiosperms
- Clade: Eudicots
- Clade: Rosids
- Order: Malpighiales
- Family: Salicaceae
- Genus: Salix
- Species: S. calcicola

Binomial name
- Salix calcicola Fernald & Wiegand

Species of shrub

Salix calcicola, known as limestone willow or woolly willow, is a species of willow native to the subarctic and Arctic regions of Canada, including Nunavut Islands, continental Nunavut, northern Quebec, Labrador. Arctic islands: Baffin, King William, Southampton, and Coats (Boothia Peninsula).

It is a low growing shrub with usually ovate leaves and catkins that emerge in the early spring before the leaves emerge.

The species has been treated as subspecies of Salix lanata, but it is not proven.
