= Salix paraflabellaris =

Scientific classification
- Kingdom: Plantae
- Clade: Tracheophytes
- Clade: Angiosperms
- Clade: Eudicots
- Clade: Rosids
- Order: Malpighiales
- Family: Salicaceae
- Genus: Salix
- Species: S. paraflabellaris

Binomial name
- Salix paraflabellaris S.D.Zhao

Species of willow

Salix paraflabellaris is a species of willow, belonging to the family Salicaceae. It can be found in Southwestern China, primarily on the northwestern part of Yunnan.

== Characteristics ==
Salix paraflabellaris has its trunk laying on or slightly above the ground. Its young twigs are bare and slightly straight. Its leaves are obovate or obovate-elliptic, with length of 10-17 mm and width of 7-12 mm.
