= Salix chikungensis =

Scientific classification
- Kingdom: Plantae
- Clade: Tracheophytes
- Clade: Angiosperms
- Clade: Eudicots
- Clade: Rosids
- Order: Malpighiales
- Family: Salicaceae
- Genus: Salix
- Species: S. chikungensis

Binomial name
- Salix chikungensis C.K.Schneid.

Plant in the genus of willows

Salix chikungensis is a shrub in the willow genus Salix with tomentose hairy and later balding branches. The leaf blades have lengths of 6 to 8.5 centimeters. The natural range of the species is in China.

== Taxonomy ==
Salix chikungensis was described in 1920 by Camillo Karl Schneider.

== Description ==
The species has dark brown twigs that are initially tomentose and then bald. The buds are yellowish brown, egg-shaped and glabrous. The leaves have decrepit stipules and a petiole about 8 millimeters long. The leaf blade is elliptical, elliptical-lanceolate, oblong obscure-lanceolate or ovate-lanceolate, 6 to 8.5 inches long and 1.5 to 2 centimeters wide, short acuminate or pointed, with a wedge-shaped to broadly wedge-shaped base and sawn leaf margin. The upper side of the leaf is dull green, initially finely hairy and later balding, the underside is glaucous, initially thickly hairy and silky and also balding.

The male inflorescences are 2.4 to 2.7 centimeters long catkins . The inflorescence stalk is 5 to 6 millimeters long, the inflorescence axis is hairy tomentose. The bracts are brownish, ovate-lanceolate or ovate-oblong, about 2.5 millimeters long, finely hairy on both sides and with a blunt tip. Male flowers have an adaxial and an abaxial nectar gland . The two free stamenshave about 4 millimeters long and downy hairy stamens at the base. Female catkins are few-flowered, cylindrical, thin, 3 to 4 inches long with a diameter of 8 millimeters. The inflorescence stalk is rarely from 2.5, usually 3 to 4 inches long and has three to five leaves. The bracts are brownish, triangular-lanceolate, 1.5 to 2 millimeters long and pointed. The upper side is hairy, the underside almost glabrous or finely hairy at the base. Female flowers have a broadly ovate or blunt adaxial gland and a small abaxial gland. The ovary is 2.3 to 3 millimeters long, glabrous and stalked about 0.5 millimeters long. The stylus and the scar are short. As fruitoval-elliptical capsules are formed. Salix chikungensis blooms in April and May, the fruits ripen from May to June.

== Range ==
The natural range is in the Chinese provinces of Henan and Jiangxi. Salix chikungensis grows along rivers at altitudes of 1500 to 2500 meters.

== Literature ==
- Wu Zheng-yi, Peter H. Raven (Ed.): Flora of China . Volume 4: Cycadaceae through Fagaceae . Science Press / Missouri Botanical Garden Press, Beijing / St. Louis 1999, ISBN 0-915279-70-3, pp. 181, 184 (English).
