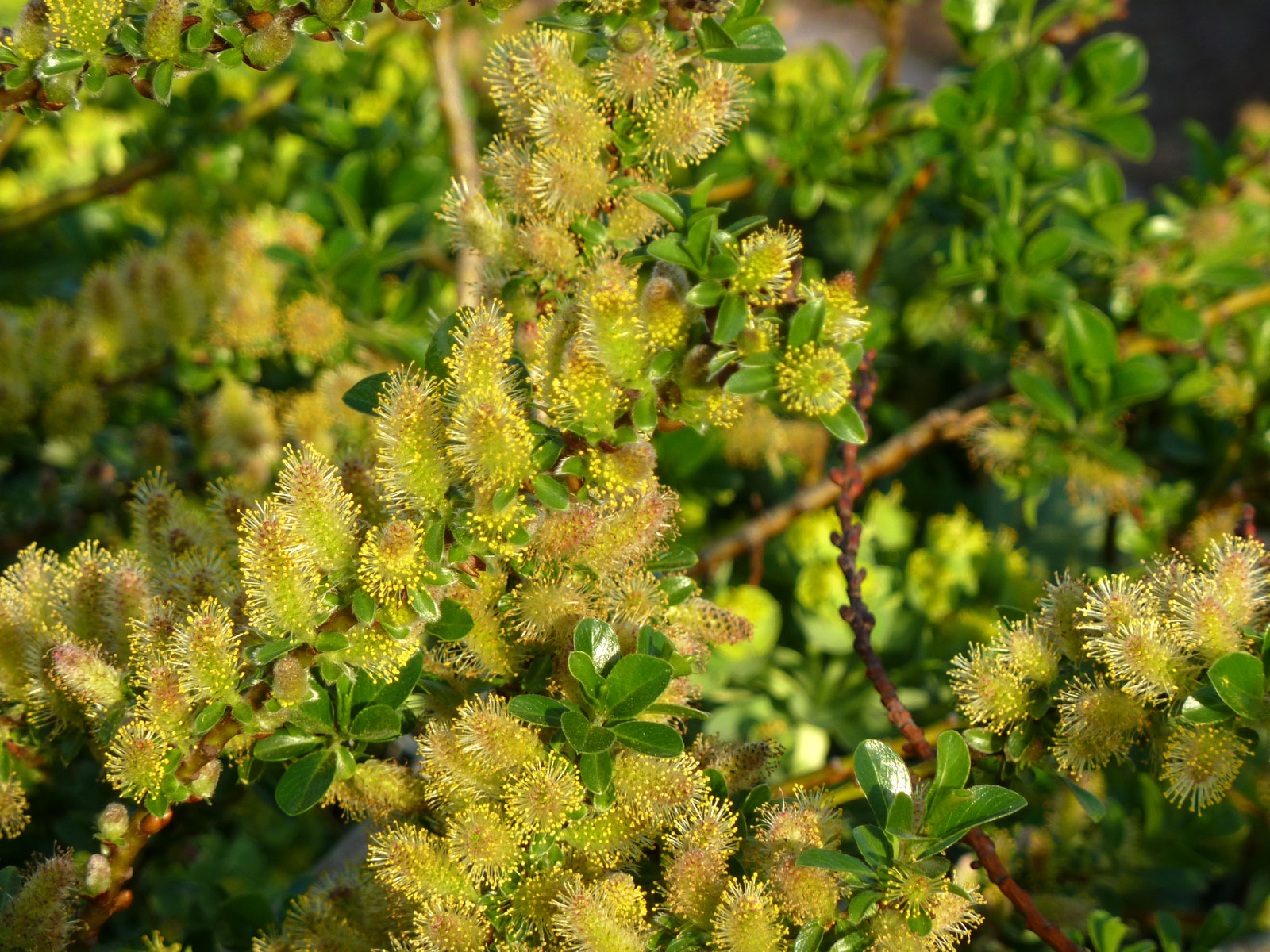
- Catkins and leaves

Scientific classification
- Kingdom: Plantae
- Clade: Embryophytes
- Clade: Tracheophytes
- Clade: Spermatophytes
- Clade: Angiosperms
- Clade: Eudicots
- Clade: Rosids
- Order: Malpighiales
- Family: Salicaceae
- Genus: Salix
- Species: S. apoda

Binomial name
- Salix apoda Trautv.

Synonyms
- Salix hastata var. apoda (Trautv.) Laksch. ex Goerz

= Salix apoda =

Species of flowering plant

Salix apoda, the Caucasian willow (an appellation it shares with other members of its genus), is a species of flowering plant in the family Salicaceae, native to the Caucasus and northern Turkey. A prostrate shrub, it is occasionally cultivated as an ornamental ground cover in rock gardens, particularly the males, since they produce large, silvery catkins that then erupt in yellow stamens.
