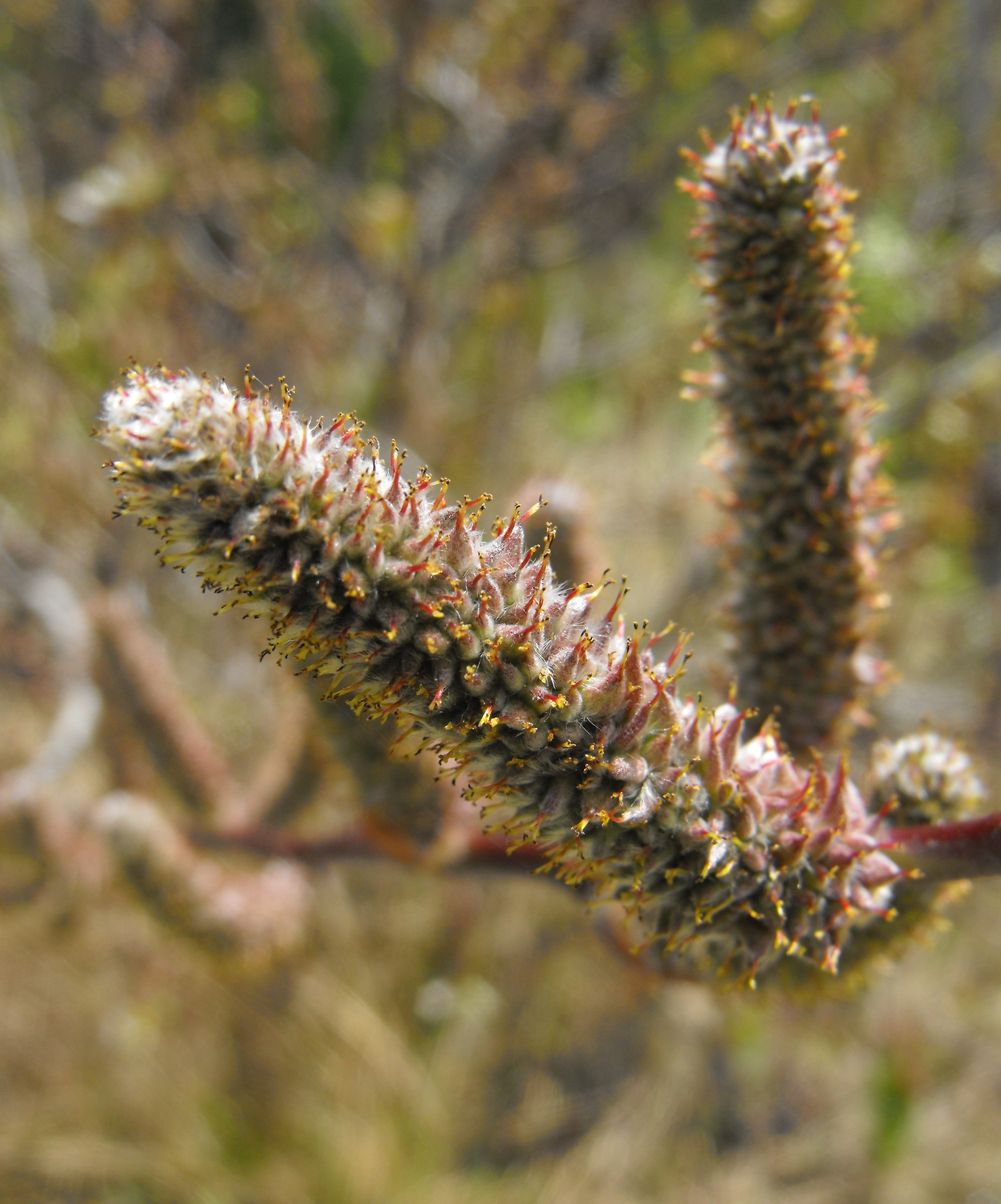
- Catkin

Conservation status
- Least Concern (IUCN 3.1)

Scientific classification
- Kingdom: Plantae
- Clade: Tracheophytes
- Clade: Angiosperms
- Clade: Eudicots
- Clade: Rosids
- Order: Malpighiales
- Family: Salicaceae
- Genus: Salix
- Species: S. breweri

Binomial name
- Salix breweri Bebb

= Salix breweri =

Species of willow

Salix breweri is a species of willow known by the common name Brewer's willow. It is endemic to California, where it can be found in the serpentine soils of the Coast Ranges in and around the San Francisco Bay Area. It is a riparian shrub growing one to four meters in height. The yellowish or reddish brown stems are lightly hairy in texture, the small twigs coated in velvety fibers. The leaves are generally lance-shaped, smooth-edged or gently toothed, and partially rolled under along the edges. The leaves are hairy, with the lower surfaces often quite woolly. Mature leaves may be 14 centimeters long or more. The inflorescence is a catkin which develops before the plant produces leaves. The catkins are up to 5 or 6 centimeters long, the female ones lengthening further as the fruits develop.
