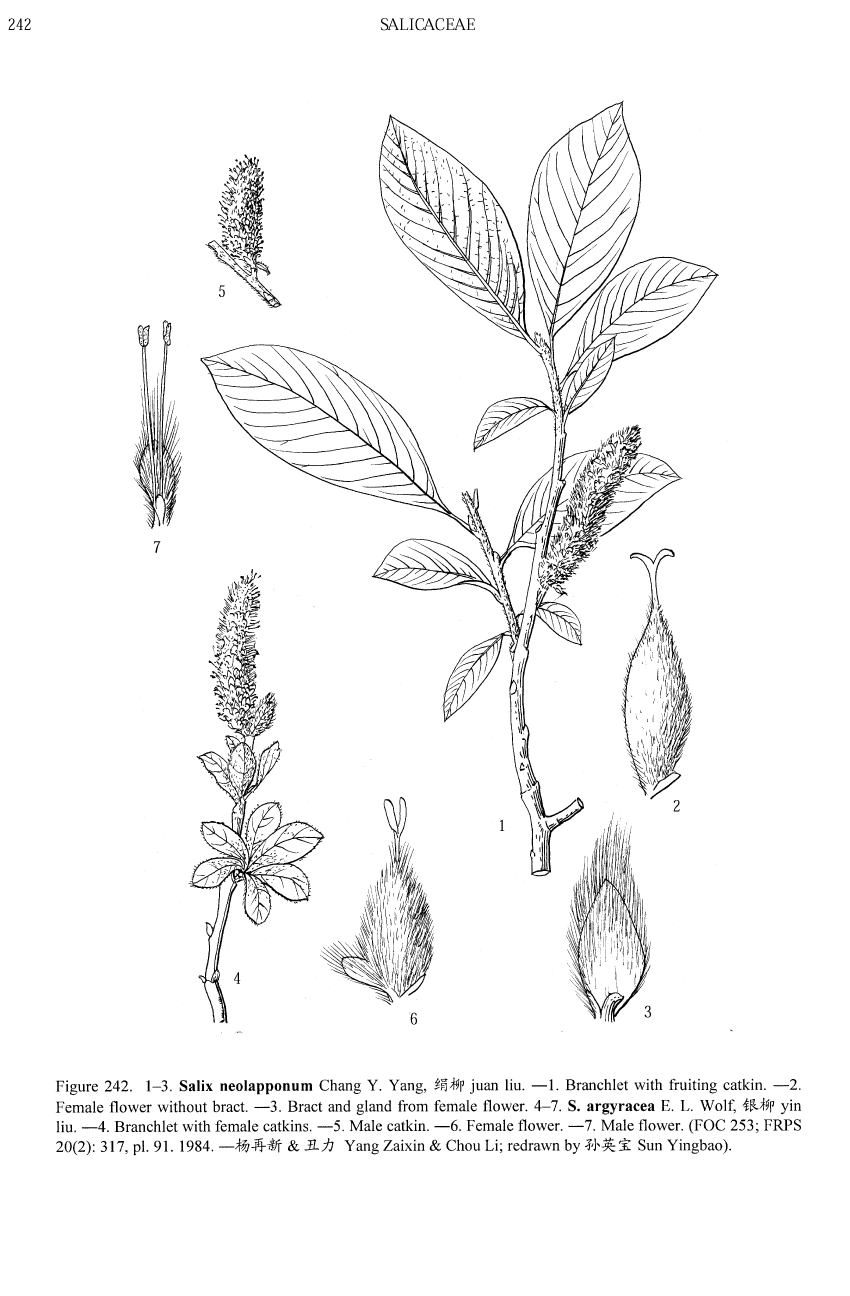
- From Flora of China, vol. 4

Scientific classification
- Kingdom: Plantae
- Clade: Tracheophytes
- Clade: Angiosperms
- Clade: Eudicots
- Clade: Rosids
- Order: Malpighiales
- Family: Salicaceae
- Genus: Salix
- Species: S. argyracea

Binomial name
- Salix argyracea E.L.Wolf

= Salix argyracea =

Shrub in the genus of willows

Salix argyracea is a large shrub from the genus of willow (Salix) with up to 10 centimeters long leaf blades with a felty hairy and shiny underside. The natural range of the species is in Kazakhstan, Kyrgyzstan, and China.

== Description ==
Salix argyracea is a shrub up to 5 meters high with a gray bark. The branches are yellowish to brown, glabrous, and initially finely tomentose. The buds are brown, egg-shaped, initially finely tomentose and hairy. The stipules are lanceolate or ovate-lanceolate and deciduous. The leaveshave an approximately 5 to 10 millimeter long, tomentose-haired petiole. The leaf blade is 3 to 10 centimeters long, 1.5 to 2 centimeters wide, obovate, oblong-obovate, rarely oblong-lanceolate or broad-lanceolate, short acuminate, with a wedge-shaped leaf base and a glandular serrate edge. The upper side of the leaf is green and glabrous, the underside with densely tomentose hairs and shiny. Eight to 18 pairs of nerves are formed on the side of the brownish midrib.

As male inflorescences 2 centimeters long, almost sedentary catkins are formed. The bracts are ovate, with a pointed or slightly blunt tip, black, and long gray hairs. Male flowers have an adaxially located nectar gland. The two stamens are ingrown and bare, the anthers are rounded and blunt. Female catkins are 2 to 4 centimeters long with short stalked stems. The bracts resemble those of the male kitten. Female flowers have an adaxially located nectar gland. The ovary is ovoid-conical, almost sessile and densely hairy graufilzig. The stylusis about 1 millimeter long and brown, the stigma is about as long as the style and has lobes that stand apart. Salix argyracea flowers from May to June before the leaves shoot, the fruits ripen from July to August.

The number of chromosomes is 2n = 76.

== Occurrence and location requirements ==
The natural range is in forest edges and in spruce forests in the mountains in the south of Kazakhstan, in Kyrgyzstan and in the autonomous region of Xinjiang in China.

== Systematics ==
Salix argyracea is a species from the genus of willows (Salix) in the willow family (Salicaceae). There it is assigned to the Argyraceae section. It was in 1905 by Egbert Ludwigowitsch Wolf scientifically for the first time described. The generic name Salix comes from Latin and was already used by the Romans for various types of willow. The specific epithet argyracea is derived from Greek argyros for " silver ", and with the Latin ending -aceus means something like "silver gray".

== Literature ==
- Wu Zheng-yi, Peter H. Raven (Ed.): Flora of China. Volume 4: Cycadaceae through Fagaceae. Science Press / Missouri Botanical Garden Press, Beijing / St. Louis 1999, ISBN 0-915279-70-3, pp. 253 (English).
- Helmut Genaust: Etymological dictionary of botanical plant names. 3rd, completely revised and expanded edition. Nikol, Hamburg 2005, ISBN 3-937872-16-7 (reprint from 1996).
