= Salix daliensis =

Scientific classification
- Kingdom: Plantae
- Clade: Tracheophytes
- Clade: Angiosperms
- Clade: Eudicots
- Clade: Rosids
- Order: Malpighiales
- Family: Salicaceae
- Genus: Salix
- Species: S. daliensis

Binomial name
- Salix daliensis C.F.Fang & S.D.Zhao

Shrub in the genus of willows

Salix daliensis is a shrub from the genus of willows (Salix) with mostly 5 to 6 centimeters long leaf blades. The natural range of the species is in China.

== Description ==
Salix daliensis grows like a shrub. The twigs are initially hairy and later bald. The buds are brownish red and egg-shaped. The leaves have a rarely from 3, usually 6 to 7 millimeters long, densely downy hairy petiole. The leaf blade is lanceolate or oblong-lanceolate to narrowly ovate, from 3 mostly 5 to 6, rarely up to 8 centimeters long and 0.6 to 1.5 sometimes up to 2 centimeters wide. The leaf margin is entire or indistinctly and closely covered with glands, the leaf base is wedge-shaped and rounded, the leaf end pointed. The upper side of the leaf is green to dark green and almost bare, the underside is densely white and silky hairy and shiny. The central vein is elevated and more than 20 pairs of side veins are formed.

The inflorescences are cylindrical, 1.5 to 6 rarely to 15 centimeters long and 4 to 6 millimeters in diameter catkins. Two to five small leaves are formed on the peduncle. The bracts are inverted triangular to triangular-egg-shaped, densely white and downy hairy, ciliate and have a truncated tip. Male flowers have an adaxial and an abaxial nectar gland that are ovate to oblong, about half as long as the bracts and have a truncated or edged tip. The two stamensstand free. The stamens are about twice as long as the bracts and almost completely hairy down. The anthers are yellow and ellipsoidal. Female flowers have an adaxial, oblong, egg-shaped nectar gland that about one-third the length of the ovary achieved. The ovary is egg-shaped, sessile, about 2 millimeters long and hairy white downy. The pen is divided approximately half to one-third as long as the ovary, completely or bilobed. The scar is bilobed and short. The fruits are densely fluffy hairy capsules. Salix daliensis flowers when the leaves shoot in April, the fruits ripen in June.

== Range ==
The natural range is in the southwest of the Chinese province of Hubei, in the south of Sichuan and in Yunnan. Salix daliensis grows in valleys, on mountain slopes and in forests at altitudes of 1500 to 2700 meters.

== Taxonomy ==
Salix daliensis is a species from the genus of willows (Salix) in the willow family (Salicaceae). There, it is the section Psilostigmatae assigned. It was only in 1980 by Fang Zhenfu and Zhao Shi Dong in the Bulletin of Botanical Laboratory of North-Eastern Forestry Institute scientifically described. Salix daliensis is similar to Salix wolohoensis, but differs from it by the silky hairy and shiny underside of the leaf and the divided style. It differs from the similarly similar Salix psilostigma in the pointed end of the leaf, the short petiole, the thin catkins, the shorter, two-part style and the short ovary.

== Literature ==
- Wu Zheng-yi, Peter H. Raven (Ed.): Flora of China. Volume 4: Cycadaceae through Fagaceae. Science Press / Missouri Botanical Garden Press, Beijing / St. Louis 1999, ISBN 0-915279-70-3, pp. 226, 232 (English).
