= Salix aeruginosa =

Conservation status
- Endangered (IUCN 3.1)

Scientific classification
- Kingdom: Plantae
- Clade: Tracheophytes
- Clade: Angiosperms
- Clade: Eudicots
- Clade: Rosids
- Order: Malpighiales
- Family: Salicaceae
- Genus: Salix
- Species: S. aeruginosa

Binomial name
- Salix aeruginosa E.Carranza

Species of willow

Salix aeruginosa is a species of willow native to central and southwest Mexico. In 2020 it was listed as endangered on the IUCN Red List.
