= Salix argyrophylla =

Scientific classification
- Kingdom: Plantae
- Clade: Tracheophytes
- Clade: Angiosperms
- Clade: Eudicots
- Clade: Rosids
- Order: Malpighiales
- Family: Salicaceae
- Genus: Salix
- Species: S. argyrophylla

Binomial name
- Salix argyrophylla Lacksch.

Synonyms
- Salix pantosericea Görz

Species of willow

Salix pantosericea is a species of willow first described by Görz in 1934 from the Caucasus region.
