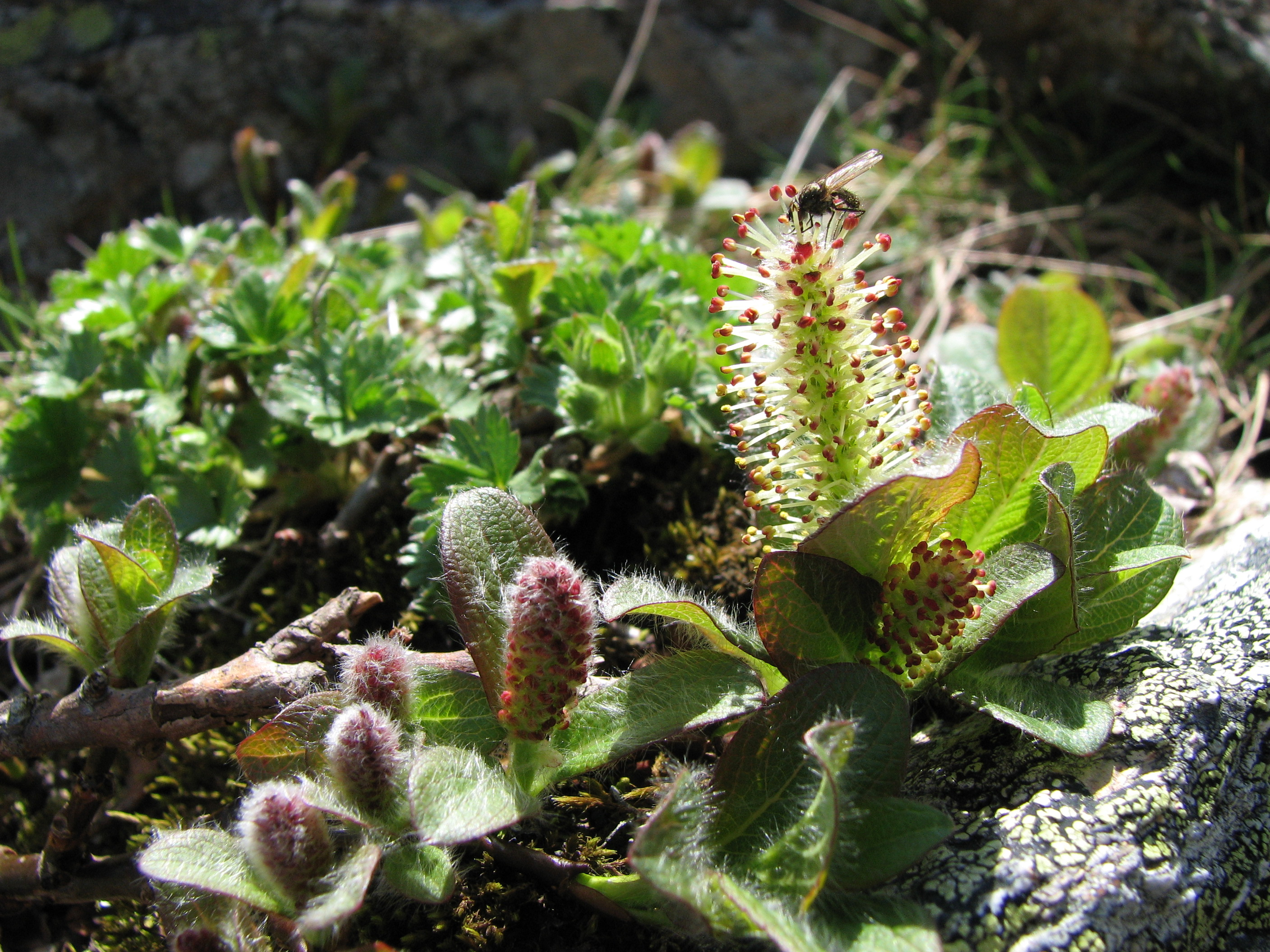

Scientific classification
- Kingdom: Plantae
- Clade: Tracheophytes
- Clade: Angiosperms
- Clade: Eudicots
- Clade: Rosids
- Order: Malpighiales
- Family: Salicaceae
- Genus: Salix
- Species: S. nakamurana

Binomial name
- Salix nakamurana Koidz.

Synonyms
- List: Salix aquilonia Kimura; Salix ketoiensis Kimura; Salix nakamurana f. neoreticulata (Nakai) H.Ohashi; Salix nakamurana subsp. yezoalpina (Koidz.) H.Ohashi; Salix neoreticulata Nakai; Salix rashuwensis Kimura; Salix yezoalpina Koidz.; Salix yezoalpina f. neoreticulata (Nakai) T.Shimizu

= Salix nakamurana =

Species of shrub

Salix nakamurana (Japanese: renge-iwa-yanagi) is a rare species of willow native to alpine slopes of central Japan. It is a deciduous small prostrate shrub.
