= Salix alexii-skvortzovii =

Scientific classification
- Kingdom: Plantae
- Clade: Tracheophytes
- Clade: Angiosperms
- Clade: Eudicots
- Clade: Rosids
- Order: Malpighiales
- Family: Salicaceae
- Genus: Salix
- Species: S. alexii-skvortzovii

Binomial name
- Salix alexii-skvortzovii A.P.Khokhr

Species of willow

Salix alexii-skvortzovii is a species of willow native to eastern Asia.
