= Salix nuristanica =

Scientific classification
- Kingdom: Plantae
- Clade: Tracheophytes
- Clade: Angiosperms
- Clade: Eudicots
- Clade: Rosids
- Order: Malpighiales
- Family: Salicaceae
- Genus: Salix
- Species: S. nuristanica

Binomial name
- Salix nuristanica A.K.Skvortsov

Species of willow

Salix nuristanica is a species of willow which was described by A.K.Skvortsov in 1965.

== Range ==
Salix nuristanica is found in Afghanistan and northern Pakistan.
