= Salix calyculata =

Scientific classification
- Kingdom: Plantae
- Clade: Tracheophytes
- Clade: Angiosperms
- Clade: Eudicots
- Clade: Rosids
- Order: Malpighiales
- Family: Salicaceae
- Genus: Salix
- Species: S. calyculata

Binomial name
- Salix calyculata Hook.f. ex Andersson

Shrub in the genus of willows

Salix calyculata is a low shrub in the willow genus Salix with mostly 8 to 15 millimeter long leaf blades. The natural range of the species is in China, Sikkim, and Bhutan. A distinction is made between two varieties.

== Taxonomy ==
The species was described in 1860 by Joseph Dalton Hooker; an earlier but not recognized description comes from Nils Johan Andersson. The specific epithet calyculata is derived from the Latin expression caliculus, a diminutive of calix and means "small calyx ".

A distinction is made between two varieties:

- Salix calyculata var. Calyculata with 8 to 15 millimeters long and 6 to 9 millimeters wide leaf blades. The ovary is elliptical or slightly obovate. The stalk of the ovary is longer than the ovary itself. The variety grows on gravelly ground in Bhutan, Sikkim and southern Tibet. A synonym for the variety is Salix calyculata var. Glabrifolia Handel-Mazzetti.
- Salix calyculata var. Gongshanica C.Wang & CFFang length of 5 to 12 mm and 5 to 8 mm wide leaf blades and an egg-shaped ovary. The stem is shorter than the ovary. The variety grows in crevices at altitudes of 4100 to 4700 meters in northwest Yunnan.

== Description ==
Salix calyculata is a low shrub with slightly upright branches. The leaves have a stalk about 2 to 5 millimeters long. The leaf blade is spatulate-egg-shaped, rarely from 5, mostly 8 to 15 millimeters long and from 5 mostly 6 to 9 millimeters wide, with a rounded tip, wedge-shaped base and a notched leaf margin. The upper side of the leaf is green and glabrous, the underside whitish and initially finely hairy.

Male inflorescences are broadly elliptical catkins with glabrous, tongue-shaped-obovate bracts. Female catkins are elliptical, the bracts resemble those of the male catkins. The female flowers have an adaxial nectar gland. The ovary is elliptical, slightly obovate or ovate and bare. The fruits are bare capsules.

== Range ==
The natural distribution area is in the south of Tibet, in the northwest of the Chinese province of Yunnan, in Bhutan, and in Sikkim on gravelly underground or in rock crevices. In China, the species is found at altitudes of 3400 to 4700 meters.

== Literature ==
- Wu Zheng-yi, Peter H. Raven (Ed.): Flora of China . Volume 4: Cycadaceae through Fagaceae . Science Press / Missouri Botanical Garden Press, Beijing / St. Louis 1999, ISBN 0-915279-70-3, pp. 211, 213, 214 (English).
