= Mount Ord =

Mount Ord may refer to:

- Mount Ord (Arizona)
- Mount Ord (Texas)
- Ord Peak, a sub-peak of Mount Baldy (Arizona)
- Little Mount Ord in Maricopa County, Arizona
