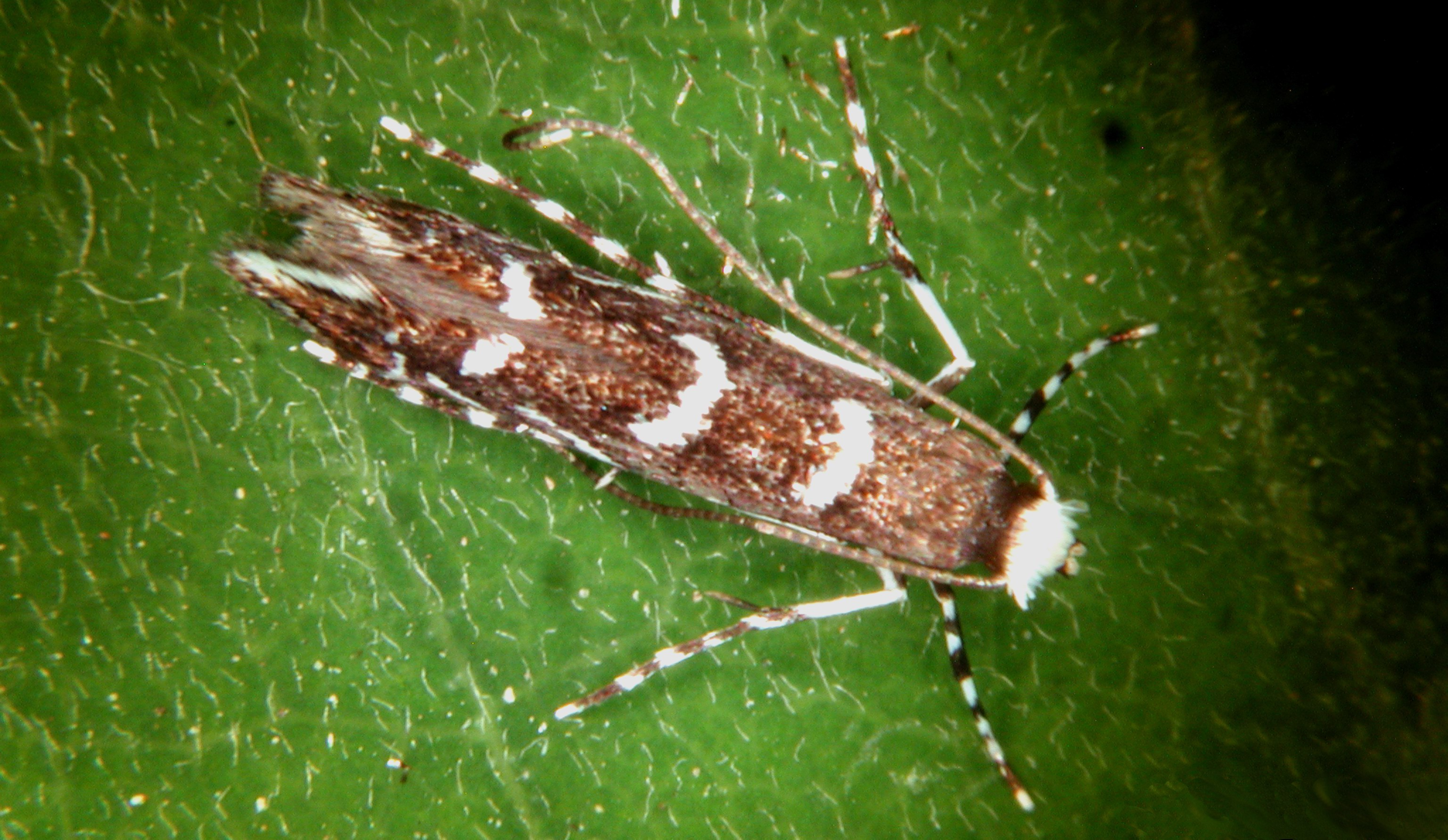
- Parectopa robiniella

Scientific classification
- Kingdom: Animalia
- Phylum: Arthropoda
- Clade: Pancrustacea
- Class: Insecta
- Order: Lepidoptera
- Family: Gracillariidae
- Subfamily: Gracillariinae
- Genus: Parectopa; Clemens, 1860

Species
- See text

= Parectopa =

Genus of insects

Parectopa is a genus of moths in the family Gracillariidae.

== Species ==
- Parectopa bosquella (Chambers, 1876)
- Parectopa bumeliella Braun, 1939
- Parectopa capnias Meyrick, 1908
- Parectopa clethrata Lower, 1923
- Parectopa dactylota Meyrick, 1915
- Parectopa exorycha Meyrick, 1928
- Parectopa geraniella Braun, 1935
- Parectopa grisella (van Deventer, 1904)
- Parectopa heptametra Meyrick, 1915
- Parectopa interpositella (Frey & Boll, 1876)
- Parectopa lespedezaefoliella Clemens, 1860
- Parectopa leucocyma (Meyrick, 1889)
- Parectopa leucographa Turner, 1940
- Parectopa lithocolletina (Zeller, 1877)
- Parectopa lithomacha Meyrick, 1915
- Parectopa lyginella (Meyrick, 1880)
- Parectopa mnesicala (Meyrick, 1880)
- Parectopa nesitis (Walsingham, 1897)
- Parectopa ononidis (Zeller, 1839)
- Parectopa ophidias (Meyrick, 1907)
- Parectopa oxysphena Meyrick, 1934
- Parectopa pennsylvaniella (Engel, 1907)
- Parectopa picroglossa Meyrick, 1912
- Parectopa plantaginisella (Chambers, 1872)
- Parectopa promylaea (Meyrick, 1817)
- Parectopa pselaphotis Meyrick, 1915
- Parectopa pulverella (Walsingham, 1897)
- Parectopa quadristrigella (Zeller, 1877)
- Parectopa refulgens Meyrick, 1915
- Parectopa robiniella Clemens, 1863
- Parectopa rotigera Meyrick, 1931
- Parectopa thermopsella (Chambers, 1875)
- Parectopa toxomacha (Meyrick, 1883)
- Parectopa trichophysa Meyrick, 1915
- Parectopa tyriancha Meyrick, 1920
- Parectopa undosa (Walsingham, 1897)
- Parectopa viminea Meyrick, 1915

== Former species ==
- Parectopa albicostella Braun, 1925
- Parectopa occulta Braun, 1922
