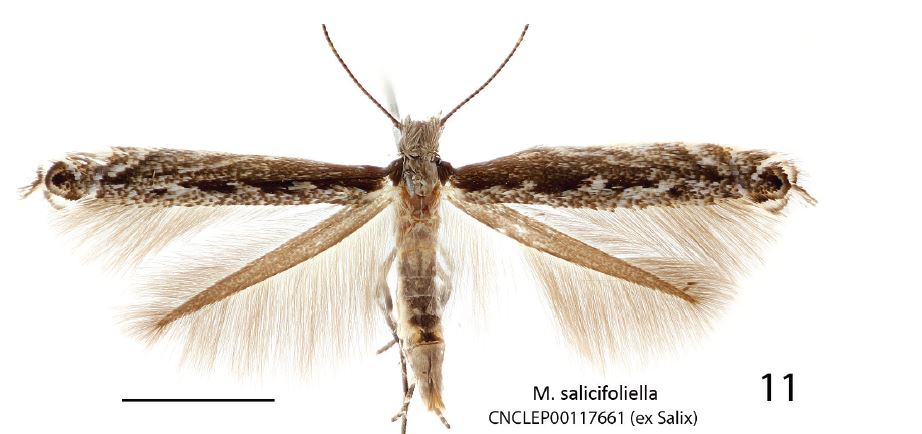

Scientific classification
- Kingdom: Animalia
- Phylum: Arthropoda
- Clade: Pancrustacea
- Class: Insecta
- Order: Lepidoptera
- Family: Gracillariidae
- Genus: Micrurapteryx
- Species: M. salicifoliella

Binomial name
- Micrurapteryx salicifoliella (Chambers, 1872)

= Micrurapteryx salicifoliella =

Species of moth

Micrurapteryx salicifoliella is a moth of the family Gracillariidae. It is known from Canada (Québec, Alberta, Saskatchewan, Manitoba, the Northwest Territories) and the United States (including Missouri, Ohio, Illinois, Minnesota, Alaska, Vermont, Kentucky, Michigan, Texas, California).

The wingspan is about 9 mm. Adults are on wing in mid to late July in Illinois, with a possibly a second generation emerging in October. In California, adults can be found from April to October and in Texas in November.

The larvae feed on Populus species (including Populus balsamifera, Populus tremuloides and Populus grandidentata) and Salix species (including Salix alba, Salix arbusculoides, Salix babylonica, Salix bebbiana, Salix brachycarpa, Salix exigua, Salix glauca, Salix integra, Salix interior, Salix lasiandra, Salix longifolia, Salix monticola, Salix novae-angliae, Salix planifolia and Salix scouleriana). They mine the leaves of their host plant.
