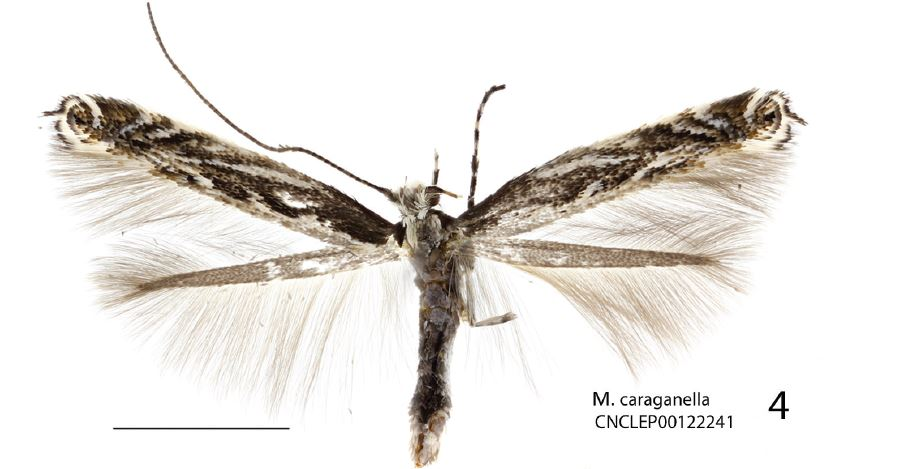

Scientific classification
- Domain: Eukaryota
- Kingdom: Animalia
- Phylum: Arthropoda
- Class: Insecta
- Order: Lepidoptera
- Family: Gracillariidae
- Genus: Micrurapteryx
- Species: M. caraganella

Binomial name
- Micrurapteryx caraganella (Hering, 1957)

Synonyms
- Parectopa caraganella Hering, 1957; Parectopa caraganella Danilevsky; Parectopa caraginella; Dovnar-Zapol’skiy, 1969

= Micrurapteryx caraganella =

Species of moth

Micrurapteryx caraganella is a moth of the family Gracillariidae. It is found in Siberia, and possibly Tajikistan and the Russian Far East.

The wingspan is 8.7–10.2 mm. The forewings are dark brown in ground colour with white markings. The costal margin with five white strigulae, the first four curving outwards, the fifth inwards, the first long and strongly oblique, the fourth often indistinct. The dorsal margin with basal two-thirds white, this fascia denticulate inwards, often linked irregularly with the costal strigulae. The apical spot is black with some mixture of paler scales, surrounded by a circular white line including the fifth costal strigula. The hindwings are as in Micrurapteryx gradatella.

The larvae feed on Caragana arborescens, Caragana frutex, Caragana boisii and Medicago sativa. They mine the leaves of their host plant. The mine is a roundish or slightly branched blotch above the midrib. Often a long, narrow tunnel is visible on the lower surface of the leaf. The mine quickly develops into an upper-surface flat blotch with digitate channels, occupying half or an entire leaflet.

== Gallery ==
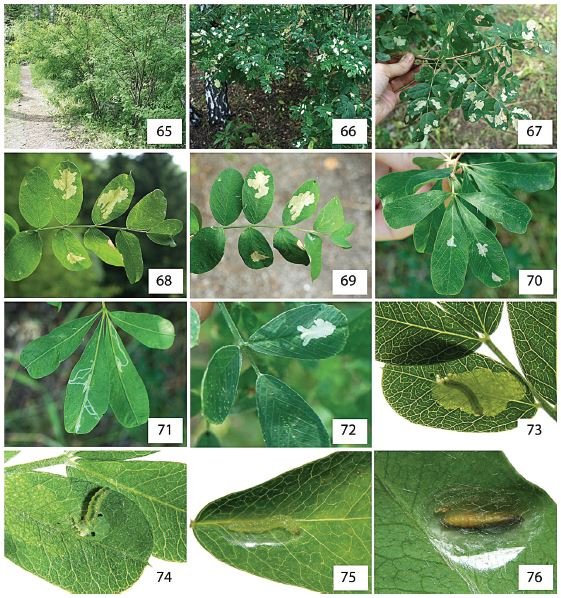
Life history of Micrurapteryx caraganella sp. n. in Siberia, Russia. 65 the species’ habitat 66–67 heavily defoliated bushes of Caragana arborescens 68–69 blotch mines on the upperside of the leaf, at transmitted light, with visible larva in one of the mines 70–71 mines on Caragana frutex, with long initial tunnels on the low side of the leaf (71) 72 mine on the leaf of Medicago sativa 73 larvae ejecting fecal pellets out of the leaf mine by protruding rear part of the body through a slit on low side of the leaf on Caragana boisii 74 larva vacating the mine on the low side of the leaf 75 larva spinning the cocoon on upper side of the leaf along the midrib 76 pupa in the transparent cocoon on lower side, perpendicular to the midrib. Collection sites: 65, 68, 69 Novosibirsk, Central Siberian botanical garden SB RAS, C. arborescens, 08.VIII.2012 73, 74 same place, C. boisii, 14.VI.2012 66, 67 Omsk, Victory Park, C. arborescens, 23.VII.2015 70, 71 same place and date, C. frutex; 72 same place and date, M. sativa 75, 76 Krasnoyarsk, Akademgorodok, the left bank of the river Yenisei, C. arborescens, 15.VII.2013.
