= M. bidentata =

M. bidentata may refer to:

- Manilkara bidentata, a large tree
- Micrurapteryx bidentata, a Kyrgyzstani moth
- Mysella bidentata, a saltwater clam
