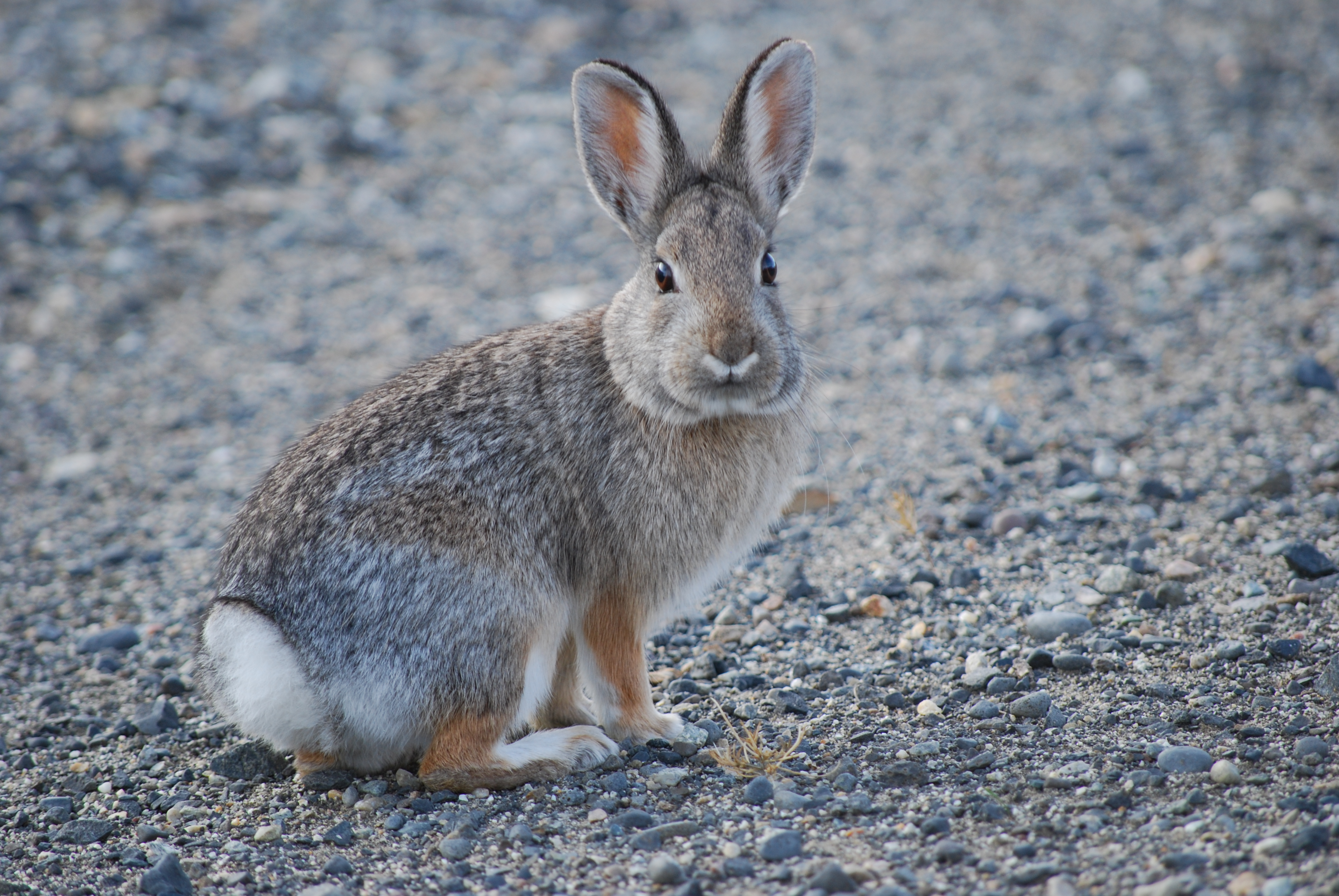
- Hanford Site, Washington, United States

Conservation status
- Least Concern (IUCN 3.1)

Scientific classification
- Kingdom: Animalia
- Phylum: Chordata
- Class: Mammalia
- Order: Lagomorpha
- Family: Leporidae
- Genus: Sylvilagus
- Species: S. nuttallii

Binomial name
- Sylvilagus nuttallii (Bachman, 1837)

Subspecies
- Sylvilagus nuttallii nuttallii (Bachman, 1837); Sylvilagus nuttallii pinetis (J. Allen, 1894); Sylvilagus nuttallii grangeri (J. Allen, 1895)
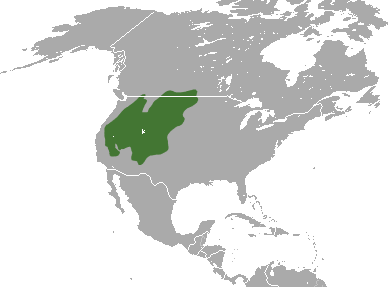
- Mountain cottontail range

Synonyms
- Synonyms: Lepus sylvaticus pinetus (M. A. Lawrence, 1993); Lepus sylvaticus pinetis (J. A. Allen, 1894); Lepus sylvaticus grangeri (J. A. Allen, 1895); Lepus nuttallii (Bachman, 1837); Lepus nuttalii (Lesson, 1842); Lepus nuttalli (J. A. Allen, 1896); Lepus laticinctus perplicatus (D. G. Elliot, 1904); Lepus artemesia (Bachman, 1839); Lepus artemisianus (J. E. Gray, 1867); Lepus sylvaticus nuttalli (F. W. True, 1885); Lepus grangeri (J. A. Allen, 1896); Sylvilagus (Sylvilagus) grangeri Lyon, 1904; Sylvilagus (Sylvilagus) nuttallii Lyon, 1904; Sylvilagus (Sylvilagus) floridanus pinetis Lyon, 1904; Sylvilagus nuttallii nuttallii V. O. Bailey, 1936; Sylvilagus nuttalli Corbet & J. Edwards Hill, 1980; Sylvilagus artemisia J. E. Gray, 1867

= Mountain cottontail =

Species of mammal

The mountain cottontail or Nuttall's cottontail (Sylvilagus nuttallii) is a species of rabbit found in western Canada and the United States. It is a medium- to small-sized rabbit with pale brown fur, white undersides, a two-colored tail, and black-tipped, rounded ears with densely furred insides. It has notably rusty-colored legs and an orange nape. The mountain cottontail appears largely among coniferous forests in mountainous regions, including the slopes of the Rocky Mountains and the Cascade-Sierra Nevada mountain ranges, and adapts to a variety of elevations and vegetation. Its diet is made up of various grasses, shrubs, and sagebrush, as well as twigs, bark, or fungi in lesser amounts or when foliage is scarce.

The mountain cottontail was first described in 1837 by naturalist John Bachman and named Lepus nuttallii; the specific name commemorates zoologist Thomas Nuttall. Marcus Ward Lyon Jr. placed the species in the genus Sylvilagus in 1904. The species is closely related to the desert cottontail, and less so to the swamp rabbit and marsh rabbit. There are three subspecies of the mountain cottontail, and limited evidence points to the three as each making up distinct species.

The range of the mountain cottontail has shrunk as a result of climate change and competition from the eastern cottontail and other leporids, though the species is sympatric with the snowshoe hare, with the mountain cottontail generally occupying lower elevations in the same region. It is a target of rabbiting and is seasonally protected by hunting authorities as game. The mountain cottontail also has many predators and is affected by various parasites and diseases such as tularemia and Rocky Mountain spotted fever. Across its entire range, the species is assessed as "least concern" by the International Union for Conservation of Nature (IUCN), but province- and state-specific conservation assessments vary, with Arizona and British Columbia marking it as "vulnerable".

== Taxonomy ==
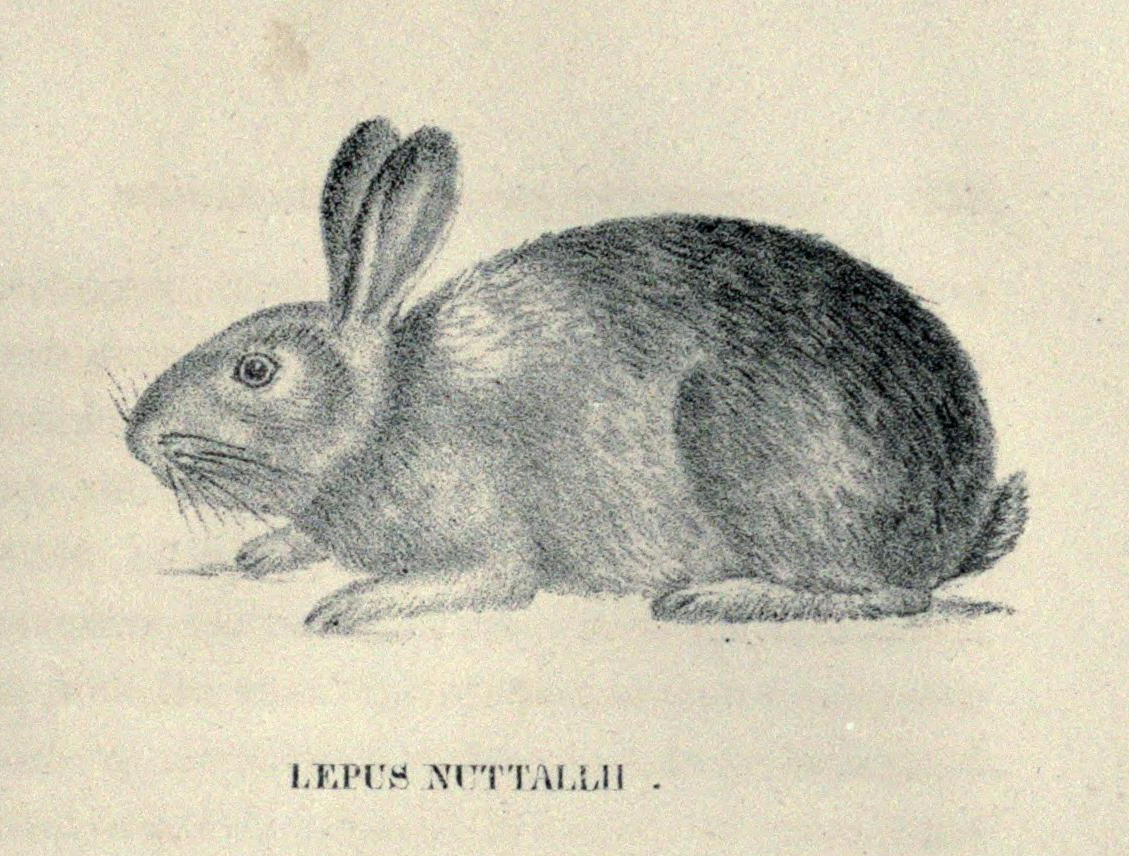
Maria Martin's illustration of the mountain cottontail from its first description

Sylvilagus nuttallii was first described by John Bachman in 1837 as Lepus nuttallii, "Nuttall's Little Hare". It was named after the English botanist and zoologist Thomas Nuttall, who collected the type specimen. Its type locality was originally noted as "west of the Rocky Mountains [...by] streams which flow into the Shoshonee and Columbia Rivers". Naturalist Edward William Nelson clarified this locality in 1909 to be "eastern Oregon, near mouth of Malheur River", and the later naturalist Vernon Orlando Bailey described it in 1936 as "near Vale". Being the smallest of the known "true hares" at the time, it was noted by Bachman as bearing resemblance to the American pika, then known as a member of the hares with the scientific name Lepus (Lagomys) princeps. The description was provided in an illustrated overview of the hares then known to inhabit the United States and Canada; the illustrations were provided by painter and scientific illustrator Maria Martin, Bachman's sister-in-law. The mountain cottontail was first placed in the genus Sylvilagus by Marcus Ward Lyon Jr. in 1904, who used a method based on skeletal characteristics to classify the known lagomorphs (then known as members of order Duplicidentata).

Based on nuclear and mitochondrial gene analysis, it is estimated to have first emerged roughly 5 million years ago, in the early Pliocene. Fossils of the species dating back 35,000 years have been found in caves in Utah and Texas.

The mountain cottontail has 3 subspecies:

- S. n. nuttallii (Bachman, 1837): Nominate subspecies; synonymous with Lepus artemesia (Bachman, 1839) and S. grangeri Lyon, 1904. Range extends along the western part of the species distribution from northern California to British Columbia.
- S. n. grangeri (J. Allen, 1895): synonymous with S. n. perplicatus Elliott, 1904. Type locality of Hill City, South Dakota. Range extends from northern Arizona to the Canadian provinces of Alberta and Saskatchewan.
- S. n. pinetis (J. Allen, 1894): Type locality within the White Mountains south of Mount Ord. The southernmost of the mountain cottontail subspecies, its range extends from northeastern Arizona to Colorado.

Each subspecies may constitute a separate species. However, this separation was based only on a study of dental characteristics; further studies on genetic and morphological traits have not been completed to make more definitive recommendations. The mountain cottontail's diploid chromosome number is 42, a number shared by some but not all members of the genus Sylvilagus. The species is most closely related to the desert cottontail (Sylvilagus audubonii), with which it forms a clade. Its next closest genetic relatives are the swamp rabbit (S. aquaticus) and marsh rabbit (S. palustris).

== Characteristics ==
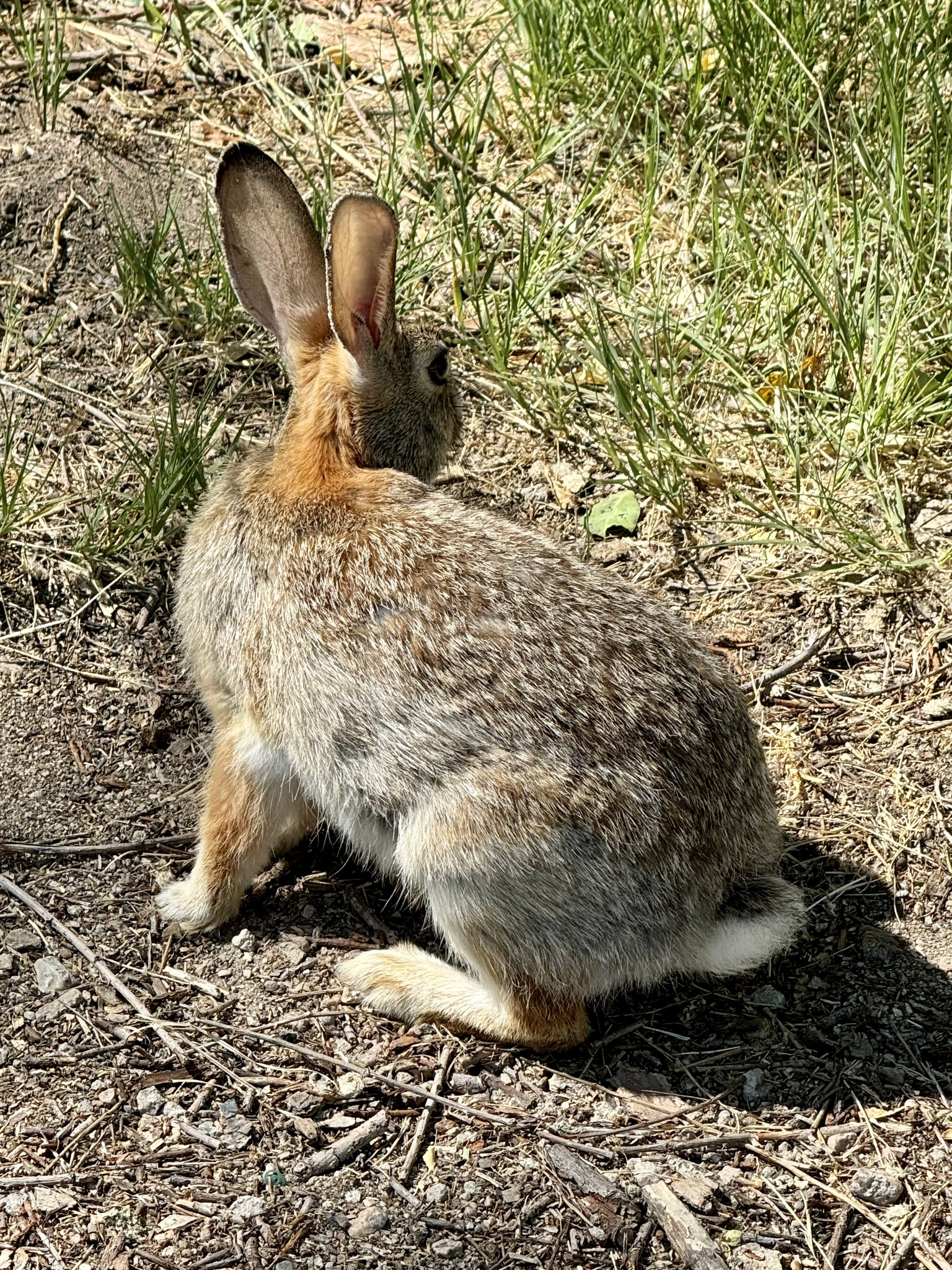
A mountain cottontail in Denver, Colorado. From the back, the colorations of the back of the head and legs are visible.

Sylvilagus nuttallii is a medium to small-sized rabbit, with a head and body length of 11 to 15 in (29 to 39 cm), though among cottontail rabbits it is relatively large. The hind legs are long; the feet are densely covered with long hair and measure from 3.1 to 4.1 in (80 to 103 mm). The ears are relatively short (2.1–3.9 in (54–100 mm)) and have rounded tips; the insides are densely furred. The tail, dark on top and white underneath, measures from 1.2 to 2.4 in (3 to 6 cm). It has pale brown fur on the back, black-tipped ears, a white-grey tail, and a white underside. The back of the head is an orange color, and the legs appear rusty on the outside. It has a distinctive cinnamon-colored ring around the eyes. Its whiskers can be either totally or partially white. Like other leporids, the mountain cottontail has a dental formula of 2.0.3.31.0.2.3 × 2 = 28, i.e. two pairs of upper and one pair of lower incisors, no canines, three upper and two lower premolars, and three upper and lower molars on either side of the jaw.

The mountain cottontail can be distinguished from other rabbits that share the same habitat by its size and ear shape. It is larger than the pygmy rabbit (S. idahoensis), smaller than the eastern cottontail (S. floridanus), and has shorter, more rounded, and more densely haired ears than the desert cottontail. The snowshoe hare occurs in many of the same geographic regions as the mountain cottontail, but has a gray fur coat that changes to entirely white in autumn and winter. Additionally, contrasting with the snowshoe hare's long hops, the mountain cottontail takes distinctively short leaps. In examining the tracks left by both species in snow, those of the snowshoe hare are much larger, with a splayed shape. Unlike the snowshoe hare, the mountain cottontail's fur coat does not change with the seasons for camouflage.

== Distribution and habitat ==
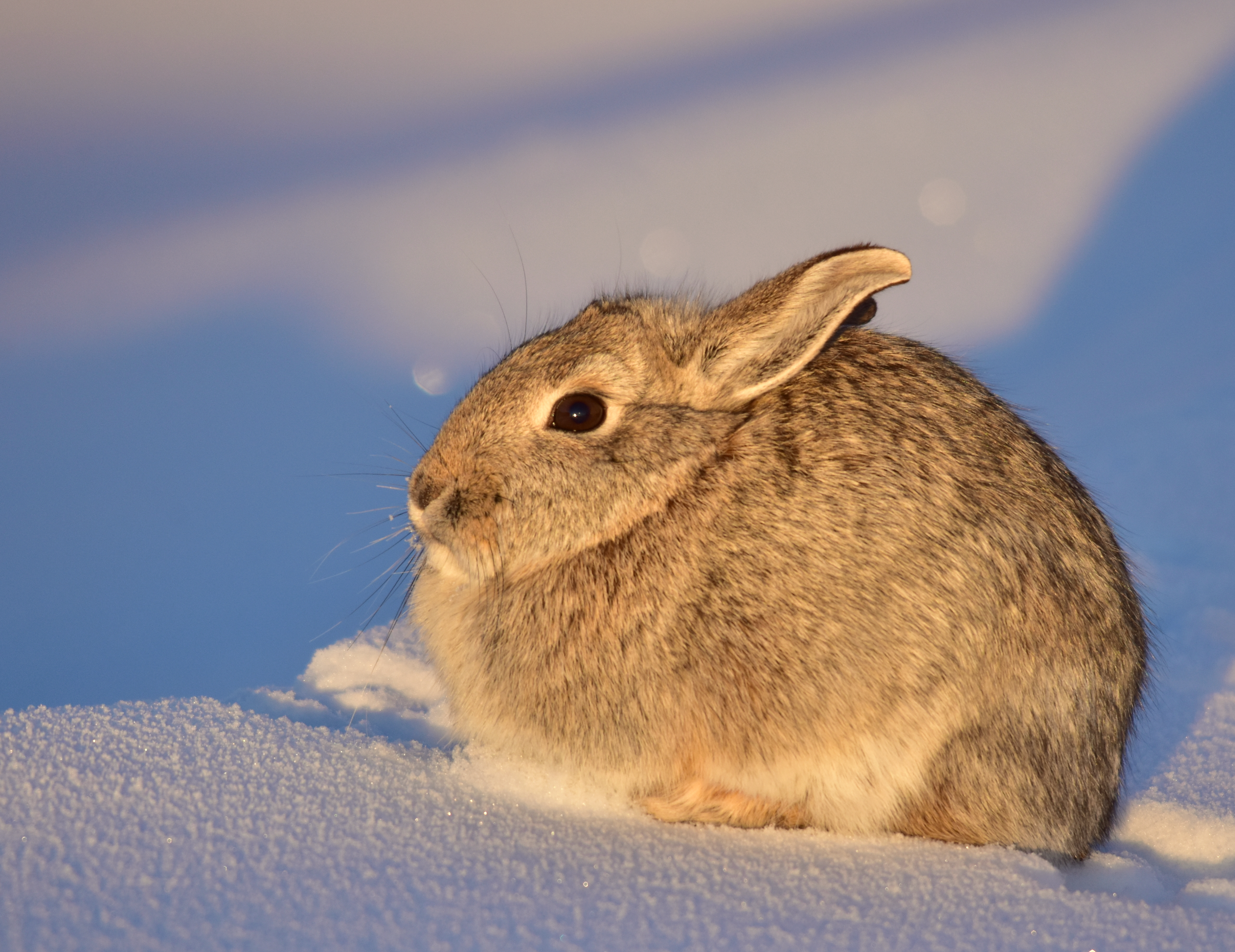
Mountain cottontail in winter. Its fur coat does not change color for camouflage to suit the changing seasons, and thus it must seek out areas with grassy cover for shelter.

Sylvilagus nuttallii is distributed throughout the Western United States and parts of Canada. It appears from the Canadian provinces of Alberta and Saskatchewan, just north of the United States-Canada border, to the northern parts of Arizona and New Mexico. Laterally, it is known from the foothills of the eastern slopes of the Rocky Mountains and west to the eastern slopes of the Cascade-Sierra Nevada. In southwestern North Dakota, it was once prevalent, but has since been largely replaced by the eastern cottontail. It was once found as far south as Texas, but changing habitat due to climate change has resulted in the species being pushed back; in these regions, the desert cottontail and robust cottontail (S. holzneri robustus) are more prevalent. The three subspecies of mountain cottontail tend to remain separated in geographical terms.

The mountain cottontail has a fairly cosmopolitan distribution, appearing at varying elevations and in regions with different vegetation. It occurs in coniferous forests, including the subalpine zone, living among rocky areas among sagebrush, in shrublands, or in wooded areas. It is more associated with sagebrush in the northern part of its distribution, and more with forests in the south. Occupying habitats elevated above those of lowland leporids, but below most pikas and the snowshoe hare (Lepus americanus), its preferred elevation varies based on location: in California, it occurs from 3,900 to 11,320 ft (1,190 to 3,450 m); in Nevada, from 3,900 to 10,400 ft (1,190 to 3,170 m); in Colorado, from 6,000 to 11,480 ft (1,830 to 3,500 m); in Oregon, from 591 to 5,495 ft (180 to 1,675 m); and in Arizona, above 7,500 ft (2,300 m). It is particularly abundant within the Hanford Site, a decommissioned nuclear production complex in Washington where it is among the animals that are monitored for caesium-137 and strontium-90 contamination.

== Behavior and ecology ==
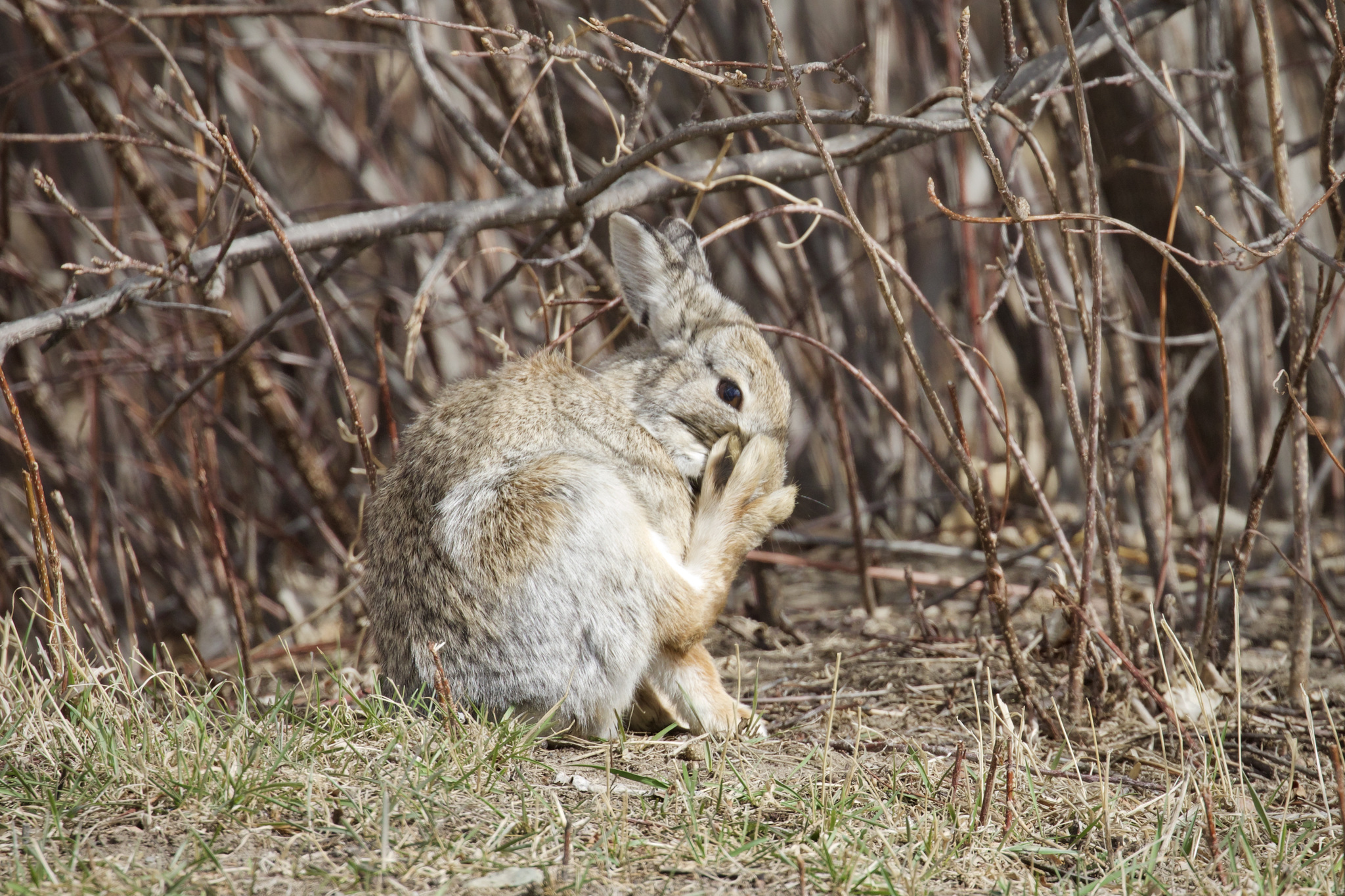
A mountain cottontail in the process of grooming

Sylvilagus nuttallii is not a social species and tends to live a solitary life. However, congregations do occur on popular feeding grounds. The majority of feeding occurs at dusk and dawn in clearings near cover or in brush. The mountain cottontail is also known to climb juniper trees to feed, and spends approximately half of its waking hours feeding. The most common social behavior seen is during reproductive actions or courting. It is not territorial. Males typically have a larger home range than females. When there is plenty of cover from dense vegetation, the mountain cottontail rests in shallow depressions or nests in the ground known as forms for shelter. When vegetation is sparse, it will use the burrows of other animals for shelter instead. It does not seem to dig burrows of its own.

The rabbits remain active all year. When startled, a rabbit will run a couple meters to a covered area to hide, then freeze with ears erect. Predators include coyotes, bobcats, lynxes, martens, crows, ravens, hawks, owls, and rattlesnakes. Though it has been replaced in some regions by the eastern and desert cottontail, it is largely sympatric with the widely distributed snowshoe hare (Lepus americanus) and the Northern Idaho ground squirrel. Several parasites are known to affect the mountain cottontail, including nematodes, cestodes, and species of Coccidia. It is affected by the tularemia-causing bacterium Francisella tularensis, as well as Rickettsia rickettsii, which causes Rocky Mountain spotted fever. Notably, it is susceptible to rabbit hemorrhagic disease virus type 2, which primarily affects the European rabbit (Oryctolagus cuniculus) and some hare species (Lepus spp.).

=== Diet ===
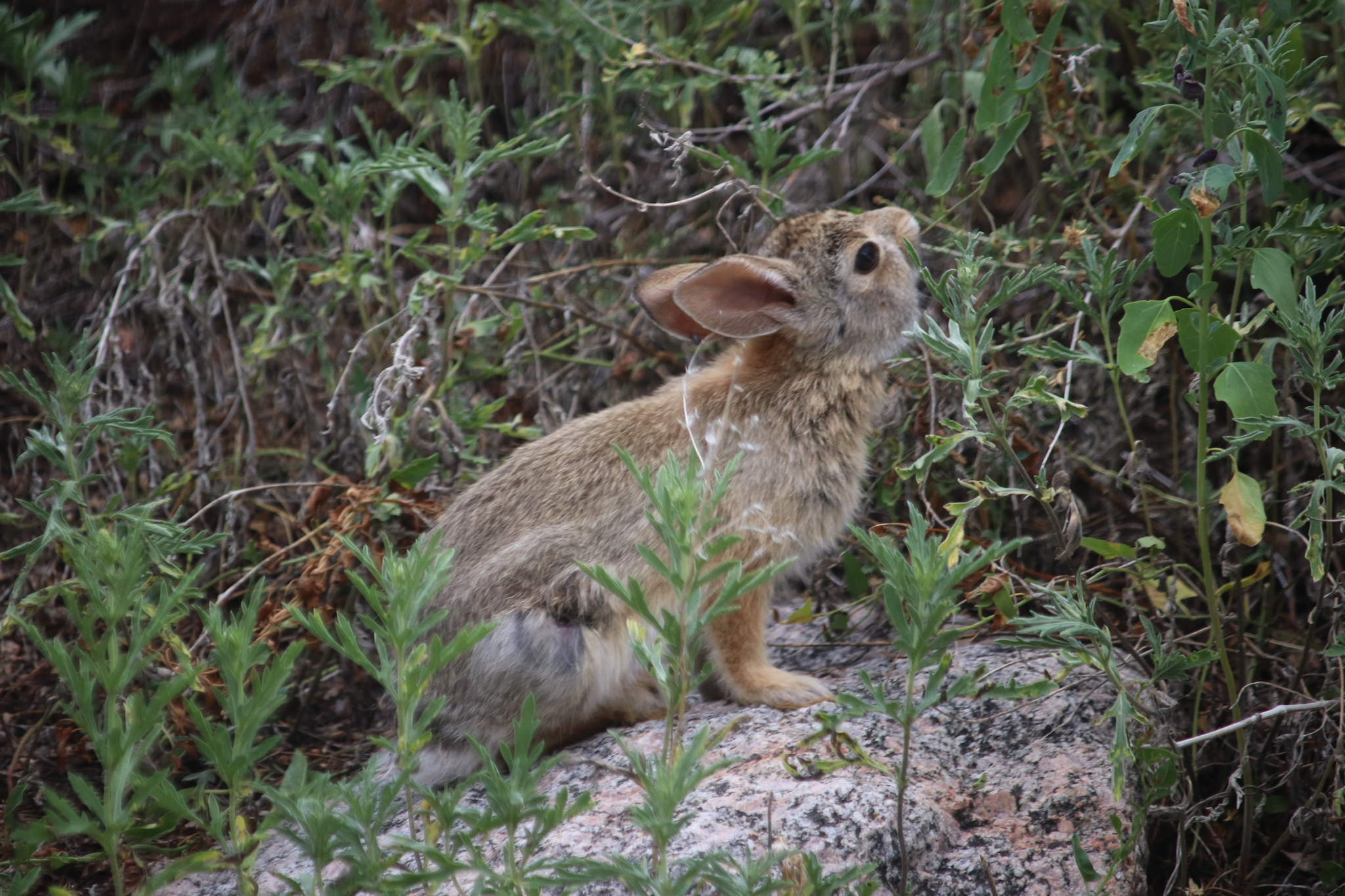
Feeding on grasses

The diet of the mountain cottontail is primarily made up of sagebrush and varies toward grasses during the spring and summer seasons. During these seasons, preferred grasses include wheatgrasses in the genus Agropyron, needle-and-thread, Indian ricegrass, cheatgrass brome, bluegrasses, and bottlebrush squirreltail. Dependent on the area, the rabbit's diet may include shrubs such as big sagebrush, rabbitbrush, and saltbushes. Juniper is also a common food source for the mountain cottontail. It is also known to feed on fungi, including truffles, but not as often as does the black-tailed jackrabbit (Lepus californicus). As food sources becomes more limited in the winter months, the diet may turn to more woody plant parts such as bark and twigs. The mountain cottontail, like other lagomorphs, consumes soft droppings that come directly from the anus in a process known as cecotrophy to supplement its nutritional intake. It is seen more often in sites grazed by horses than those where horses have been removed, a behavior not often seen in similar, seed-eating species.

=== Reproduction ===
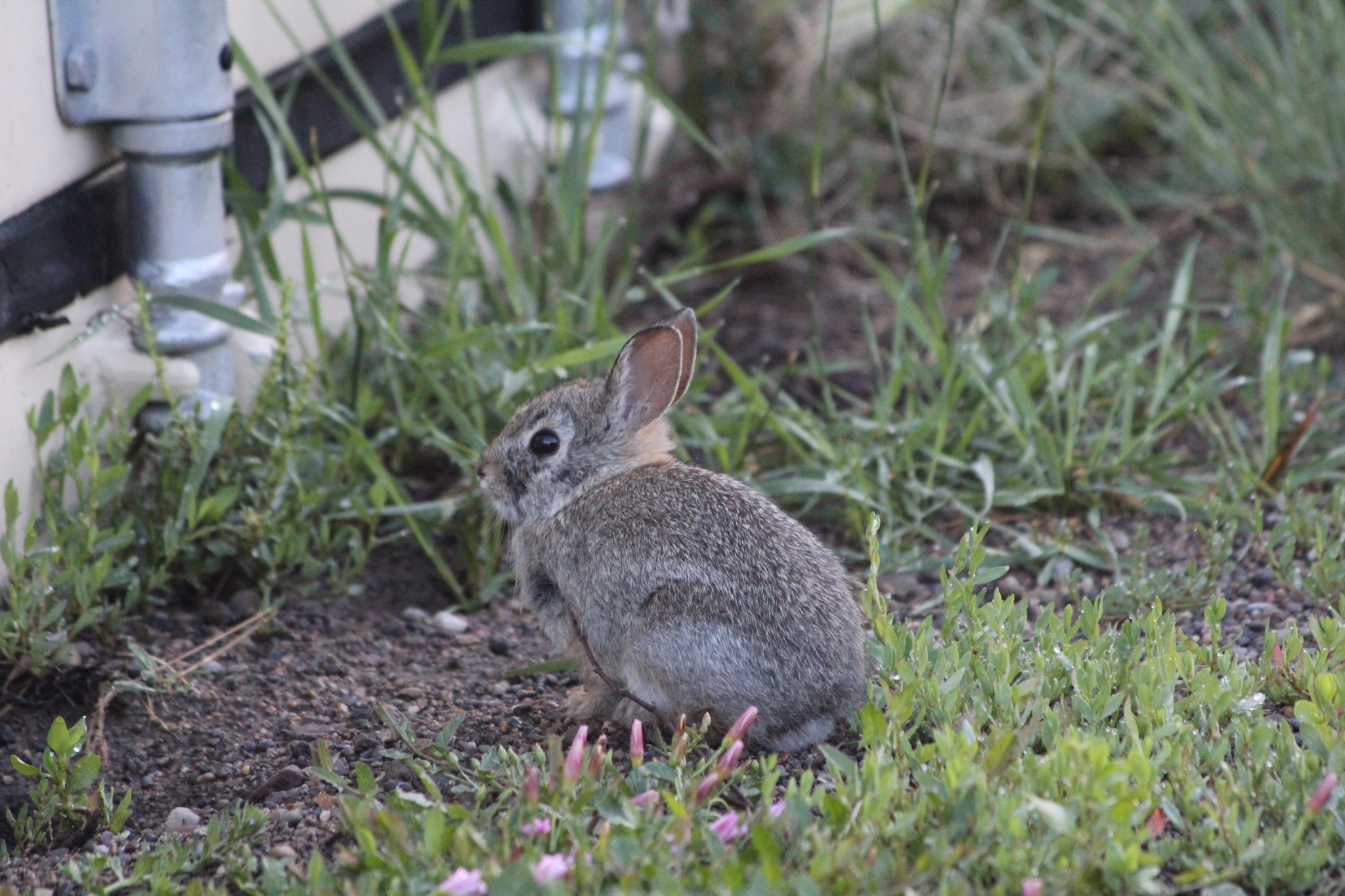
A juvenile mountain cottontail in Lethbridge, Alberta, Canada

The mountain cottontail's nest is a shallow cavity in the ground lined with rabbit fur and dried grass. The female covers the top of the nest with grass, fur, and sticks. Ratios between the sexes varies based on location; on average, the fetal sex ratio is 1 male to 1.05 females, but in Oregon it was measured at 1 male to 1.18 females. Depending on location, the breeding season will vary during the spring and summer seasons, through February to July, and possibly occurs later in warmer climates. Gestation lasts 29 days on average in the mountain cottontail, and results in a litter of 3 to 4 young; 3.5 litters are produced annually on average within the 4-month breeding season. It reaches sexual maturity at roughly 3 months old. The number of litters and young produced varies by location; in California and Nevada, the average litter size is around 6.1, 4.7 for rabbits in Washington and Oregon, and 2.0 for those in British Columbia. The young are altricial (born helpless and blind) and have a weaning period of one month.

== Status and conservation ==
Aside from predators, parasites and diseases, Sylvilagus nuttallii is threatened by competition from hares and other rabbits, climate change, and habitat fragmentation. It is commonly hunted for sport, as well as for food. Displacement in North Dakota by the eastern cottontail has led to the mountain cottontail being considered as "presumed locally extinct" within the state. Its habitat within Canada is threatened by agricultural and human settlement expansion.

Sylvilagus nuttallii is considered by the International Union for Conservation of Nature (IUCN) to be a least-concern species, though it notes that the overall population of it and several other members of Sylvilagus appears to be decreasing. As game, it is seasonally protected by state wildlife agencies, and the species is being monitored. As individually monitored by each state, its NatureServe conservation status varies: in Arizona and British Columbia, it is considered "vulnerable"; in New Mexico, Oregon, South Dakota, Montana, and Saskatchewan it is "apparently secure", and it is "secure" across the rest of its range. The species occurs in several protected areas. Given the species' wide distribution, it may have the ability to survive drastic changes in its environment. However, should the species be divided into three along subspecies lines, the resulting clades will be more constrained and less genetically diverse, and may have greater need for conservation measures.
