= Parectopa interpositella =

Scientific classification
- Kingdom: Animalia
- Phylum: Arthropoda
- Clade: Pancrustacea
- Class: Insecta
- Order: Lepidoptera
- Family: Gracillariidae
- Genus: Parectopa
- Species: P. interpositella

Binomial name
- Parectopa interpositella (Frey & Boll, 1876)

Species of moth

Parectopa interpositella is a moth of the family Gracillariidae. It is known from Texas, United States.

The larvae feed on Quercus obtusifolia. They probably mine the leaves of their host plant.
