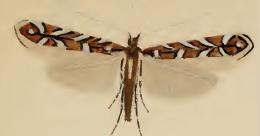

Scientific classification
- Kingdom: Animalia
- Phylum: Arthropoda
- Clade: Pancrustacea
- Class: Insecta
- Order: Lepidoptera
- Family: Gracillariidae
- Genus: Parectopa
- Species: P. ononidis

Binomial name
- Parectopa ononidis (Zeller, 1839)

Synonyms
- Gracilaria ononidis Zeller, 1839

= Parectopa ononidis =

Species of moth

Parectopa ononidis is a moth of the family Gracillariidae. It is known from all of Europe, except Ireland and the Balkan Peninsula.

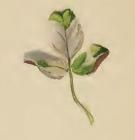
Mined clover leaf

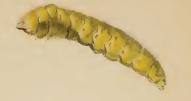
Larva

The wingspan is about 8 mm. Adults are on wing from May to August in two to three generations per year.

The larvae feed on Ononis repens, Ononis spinosa, Trifolium medium, Trifolium montanum, Trifolium ochroleucon, Trifolium pratense and Trifolium repens. They mine the leaves of their host plant.
