= Parectopa promylaea =

Scientific classification
- Kingdom: Animalia
- Phylum: Arthropoda
- Class: Insecta
- Order: Lepidoptera
- Family: Gracillariidae
- Genus: Parectopa
- Species: P. promylaea

Binomial name
- Parectopa promylaea (Meyrick, 1917)

Species of moth

Parectopa promylaea is a moth of the family Gracillariidae. It is known from Assam, India.
