= Parectopa lyginella =

Scientific classification
- Kingdom: Animalia
- Phylum: Arthropoda
- Class: Insecta
- Order: Lepidoptera
- Family: Gracillariidae
- Genus: Parectopa
- Species: P. lyginella

Binomial name
- Parectopa lyginella (Meyrick, 1880)

Synonyms
- Gracilaria lyginella Meyrick, 1880

Species of moth

Parectopa lyginella is a moth of the family Gracillariidae. It is known from New South Wales, Australia.
