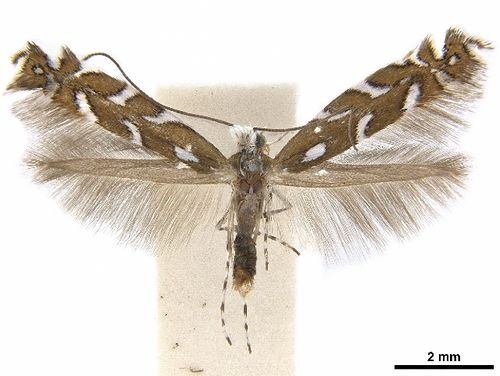

Scientific classification
- Kingdom: Animalia
- Phylum: Arthropoda
- Clade: Pancrustacea
- Class: Insecta
- Order: Lepidoptera
- Family: Gracillariidae
- Genus: Parectopa
- Species: P. pennsylvaniella

Binomial name
- Parectopa pennsylvaniella (Engel, 1907)

= Parectopa pennsylvaniella =

Species of moth

Parectopa pennsylvaniella is a moth of the family Gracillariidae. Its habitat extends from Québec, Canada, to the states of New York, Ohio, Connecticut, Kentucky, Maine and Pennsylvania in the United States.

The wingspan is about 7 mm.

The larvae feed on Symphyotrichum cordifolium. They probably mine the leaves of their host plant.
