= Parectopa pulverella =

Scientific classification
- Kingdom: Animalia
- Phylum: Arthropoda
- Clade: Pancrustacea
- Class: Insecta
- Order: Lepidoptera
- Family: Gracillariidae
- Genus: Parectopa
- Species: P. pulverella

Binomial name
- Parectopa pulverella (Walsingham, 1897)

Species of moth

Parectopa pulverella is a moth of the family Gracillariidae. It is known from the Dominican Republic and the Virgin Islands (Saint Thomas).
