= Parectopa oxysphena =

Scientific classification
- Kingdom: Animalia
- Phylum: Arthropoda
- Class: Insecta
- Order: Lepidoptera
- Family: Gracillariidae
- Genus: Parectopa
- Species: P. oxysphena

Binomial name
- Parectopa oxysphena Meyrick, 1934

Species of moth

Parectopa oxysphena is a moth of the family Gracillariidae. It is known from Maharashtra, India.

The larvae feed on Flemingia strobilifera. They probably mine the leaves of their host plant.
