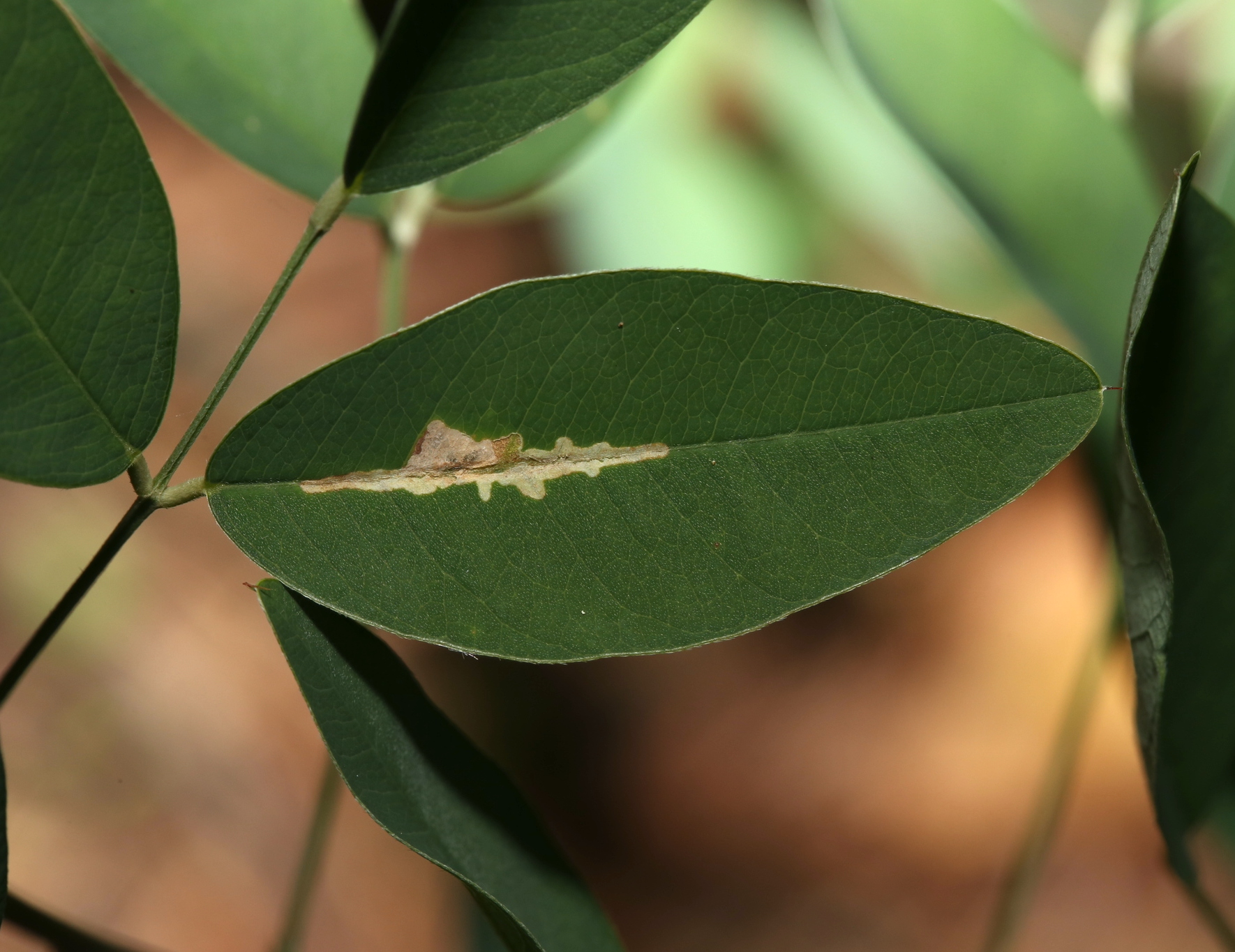
- leaf mine on Lespedeza bicolor

Scientific classification
- Kingdom: Animalia
- Phylum: Arthropoda
- Clade: Pancrustacea
- Class: Insecta
- Order: Lepidoptera
- Family: Gracillariidae
- Genus: Parectopa
- Species: P. lespedezaefoliella

Binomial name
- Parectopa lespedezaefoliella Clemens, 1860

Synonyms
- Parectopa lespedegaefoliella (Chambers, 1875); Parectopa lespedegofoliella (Chambers, 1876); Parectopa lespedesaefoliella Chambers, 1873; Parectopa lespedezifoliella Meyrick, 1912; Parectopa lespidegaefoliella (Chambers, 1877); Parectopa mirabilis (Frey & Boll, 1873)

= Parectopa lespedezaefoliella =

Species of moth

Parectopa lespedezaefoliella is a moth of the family Gracillariidae. It is known from Québec, Canada, and Maine, Pennsylvania, North Carolina and Michigan in the United States.

The larvae feed on Lespedeza species (including Lespedeza violacea), Meibomia species and Robinia species (including Robinia pseudacacia). They mine the leaves of their host plant.
