= Parectopa undosa =

Scientific classification
- Domain: Eukaryota
- Kingdom: Animalia
- Phylum: Arthropoda
- Class: Insecta
- Order: Lepidoptera
- Family: Gracillariidae
- Genus: Parectopa
- Species: P. undosa

Binomial name
- Parectopa undosa (Walsingham, 1897)

Species of moth

Parectopa undosa is a moth of the family Gracillariidae. It is known from Haiti and the Virgin Islands (Saint Thomas).
