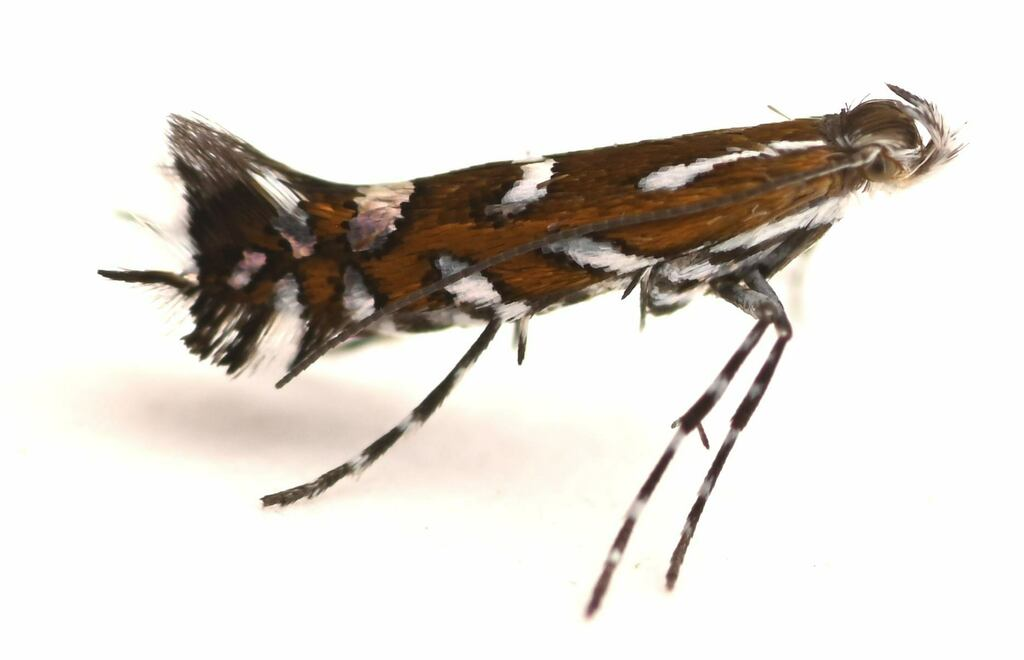

Scientific classification
- Kingdom: Animalia
- Phylum: Arthropoda
- Clade: Pancrustacea
- Class: Insecta
- Order: Lepidoptera
- Family: Gracillariidae
- Genus: Parectopa
- Species: P. plantaginisella

Binomial name
- Parectopa plantaginisella (Chambers, 1872)

= Parectopa plantaginisella =

Species of moth

Parectopa plantaginisella is a moth of the family Gracillariidae. It is known from Québec in Canada and Kentucky, Maine, Michigan, Missouri and Vermont in the United States.

The larvae feed on Erigeron species. They mine the leaves of their host plant.
