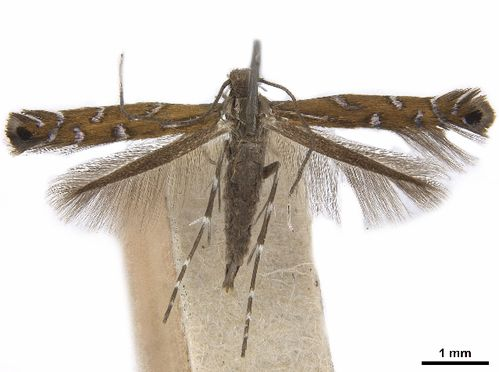

Scientific classification
- Kingdom: Animalia
- Phylum: Arthropoda
- Clade: Pancrustacea
- Class: Insecta
- Order: Lepidoptera
- Family: Gracillariidae
- Genus: Parectopa
- Species: P. geraniella

Binomial name
- Parectopa geraniella Braun, 1935

= Parectopa geraniella =

Species of moth

Parectopa geraniella is a moth of the family Gracillariidae. It is known from the US states of Ohio, Kentucky and Missouri. It was described by Annette Frances Braun in 1935.

The host plant for the species is Geranium maculatum. They mine the leaves of their host plant. The mine has the form of a linear mine, much contorted in the later stages and becoming blotch like through the confluence of the convolutions.
