= Parectopa grisella =

Scientific classification
- Domain: Eukaryota
- Kingdom: Animalia
- Phylum: Arthropoda
- Class: Insecta
- Order: Lepidoptera
- Family: Gracillariidae
- Genus: Parectopa
- Species: P. grisella

Binomial name
- Parectopa grisella (van Deventer, 1904)

Species of moth

Parectopa grisella is a moth of the family Gracillariidae. It is known from Indonesia (Java) and Malaysia (West Malaysia).

The larvae feed on Manilkara zapota and Mimusops elengi. They probably mine the leaves of their host plant.
