= Parectopa capnias =

Scientific classification
- Kingdom: Animalia
- Phylum: Arthropoda
- Class: Insecta
- Order: Lepidoptera
- Family: Gracillariidae
- Genus: Parectopa
- Species: P. capnias

Binomial name
- Parectopa capnias Meyrick, 1908

Species of moth

Parectopa capnias is a moth of the family Gracillariidae. It is known from India (Maharashtra) and Sri Lanka.

The larvae feed on Ixora parviflora. They probably mine the leaves of their host plant.
