= Micrurapteryx tibetiensis =

Scientific classification
- Domain: Eukaryota
- Kingdom: Animalia
- Phylum: Arthropoda
- Class: Insecta
- Order: Lepidoptera
- Family: Gracillariidae
- Genus: Micrurapteryx
- Species: M. tibetiensis

Binomial name
- Micrurapteryx tibetiensis Bai & Li, 2013

Species of moth

Micrurapteryx tibetiensis is a moth of the family Gracillariidae. It is known from China (Tibet).
