= Parectopa trichophysa =

Scientific classification
- Kingdom: Animalia
- Phylum: Arthropoda
- Clade: Pancrustacea
- Class: Insecta
- Order: Lepidoptera
- Family: Gracillariidae
- Genus: Parectopa
- Species: P. trichophysa

Binomial name
- Parectopa trichophysa Meyrick, 1915

Species of moth

Parectopa trichophysa is a moth of the family Gracillariidae. It is known from Peru.
