= Parectopa lithocolletina =

Scientific classification
- Kingdom: Animalia
- Phylum: Arthropoda
- Clade: Pancrustacea
- Class: Insecta
- Order: Lepidoptera
- Family: Gracillariidae
- Genus: Parectopa
- Species: P. lithocolletina

Binomial name
- Parectopa lithocolletina (Zeller, 1877)

Species of moth

Parectopa lithocolletina is a moth of the family Gracillariidae. It is known from Colombia.
