= Parectopa tyriancha =

Scientific classification
- Kingdom: Animalia
- Phylum: Arthropoda
- Class: Insecta
- Order: Lepidoptera
- Family: Gracillariidae
- Genus: Parectopa
- Species: P. tyriancha

Binomial name
- Parectopa tyriancha Meyrick, 1920

Species of moth

Parectopa tyriancha is a moth of the family Gracillariidae. It is known from Queensland, Australia.
