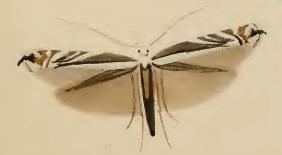
- Micrurapteryx kollariella

Scientific classification
- Domain: Eukaryota
- Kingdom: Animalia
- Phylum: Arthropoda
- Class: Insecta
- Order: Lepidoptera
- Family: Gracillariidae
- Subfamily: Gracillariinae
- Genus: Micrurapteryx; Spuler, 1910

Species
- See text

= Micrurapteryx =

Genus of moths

Micrurapteryx is a genus of moths in the family Gracillariidae.

== Species ==
- Micrurapteryx bidentata Noreika, 1992
- Micrurapteryx caraganella (Hering, 1957)
- Micrurapteryx fumosella Kuznetzov & Tristan, 1985
- Micrurapteryx gerasimovi Ermolaev, 1982
- Micrurapteryx gradatella (Herrich-Schäffer, 1855)
- Micrurapteryx kollariella (Zeller, 1839)
- Micrurapteryx occulta (Braun, 1922)
- Micrurapteryx parvula Amsel, 1935
- Micrurapteryx salicifoliella (Chambers, 1872)
- Micrurapteryx sophorella Kuznetzov, 1979
- Micrurapteryx sophorivora Kuznetzov & Tristan, 1985
- Micrurapteryx tibetiensis Bai & Li, 2013
- Micrurapteryx tortuosella Kuznetzov & Tristan, 1985
