= Micrurapteryx fumosella =

Scientific classification
- Domain: Eukaryota
- Kingdom: Animalia
- Phylum: Arthropoda
- Class: Insecta
- Order: Lepidoptera
- Family: Gracillariidae
- Genus: Micrurapteryx
- Species: M. fumosella

Binomial name
- Micrurapteryx fumosella Kuznetzov & Tristan, 1985

Species of moth

Micrurapteryx fumosella is a moth of the family Gracillariidae. It is known from Kyrgyzstan.

The larvae feed on Astragalus species (including Astragalus alpinus), Melilotus species (including Melilotus alba), Trifolium species (including Trifolium pratense) and Vicia species (including Vicia cracca). They mine the leaves of their host plant.
