= Micrurapteryx gerasimovi =

Scientific classification
- Domain: Eukaryota
- Kingdom: Animalia
- Phylum: Arthropoda
- Class: Insecta
- Order: Lepidoptera
- Family: Gracillariidae
- Genus: Micrurapteryx
- Species: M. gerasimovi

Binomial name
- Micrurapteryx gerasimovi Ermolaev, 1982

Species of moth

Micrurapteryx gerasimovi is a moth of the family Gracillariidae. It is known from the Russian Far East.

The larvae feed on Melilotus suaveolens and Vicia cracca. They mine the leaves of their host plant.
