= Micrurapteryx sophorivora =

Scientific classification
- Kingdom: Animalia
- Phylum: Arthropoda
- Clade: Pancrustacea
- Class: Insecta
- Order: Lepidoptera
- Family: Gracillariidae
- Genus: Micrurapteryx
- Species: M. sophorivora

Binomial name
- Micrurapteryx sophorivora Kuznetzov & Tristan, 1985

Species of moth

Micrurapteryx sophorivora is a moth of the family Gracillariidae. It is known from Kazakhstan, the European part of Russia and Tajikistan.

The larvae feed on Sophora species. They mine the leaves of their host plant. The mine has the form of a blotch mine.
