= Parectopa mnesicala =

Scientific classification
- Kingdom: Animalia
- Phylum: Arthropoda
- Class: Insecta
- Order: Lepidoptera
- Family: Gracillariidae
- Genus: Parectopa
- Species: P. mnesicala

Binomial name
- Parectopa mnesicala (Meyrick, 1880)

Synonyms
- Gracilaria mnesicala Meyrick, 1880

Species of moth

Parectopa mnesicala is a moth of the family Gracillariidae. It is known from New South Wales, Australia.
