= Parectopa quadristrigella =

Scientific classification
- Kingdom: Animalia
- Phylum: Arthropoda
- Clade: Pancrustacea
- Class: Insecta
- Order: Lepidoptera
- Family: Gracillariidae
- Genus: Parectopa
- Species: P. quadristrigella

Binomial name
- Parectopa quadristrigella (Zeller, 1877)

Species of moth

Parectopa quadristrigella is a moth of the family Gracillariidae. It is known from Colombia.
