= Parectopa leucographa =

Scientific classification
- Domain: Eukaryota
- Kingdom: Animalia
- Phylum: Arthropoda
- Class: Insecta
- Order: Lepidoptera
- Family: Gracillariidae
- Genus: Parectopa
- Species: P. leucographa

Binomial name
- Parectopa leucographa Turner, 1940

Species of moth

Parectopa leucographa is a moth of the family Gracillariidae. It is known from Queensland, Australia.
