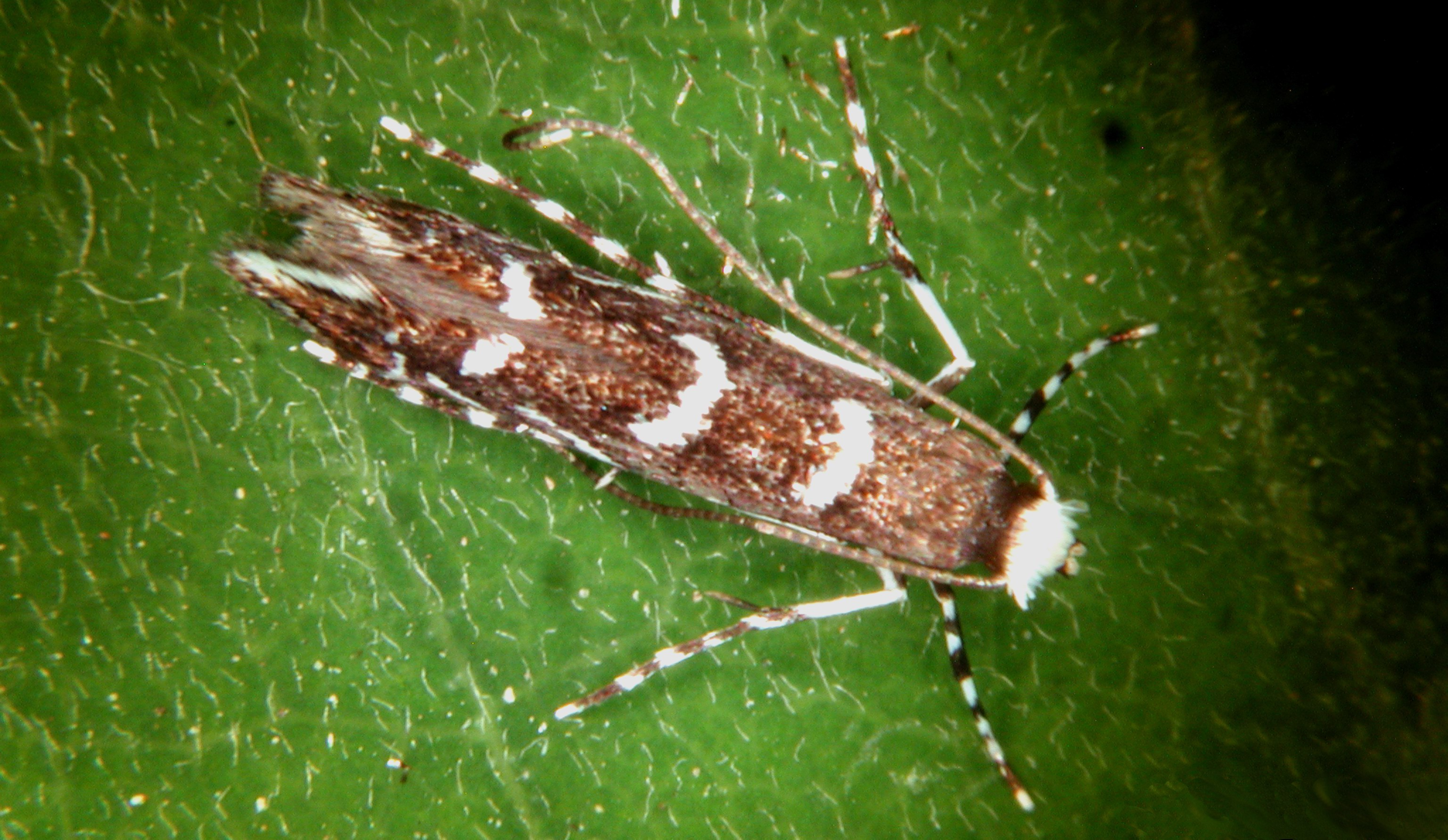

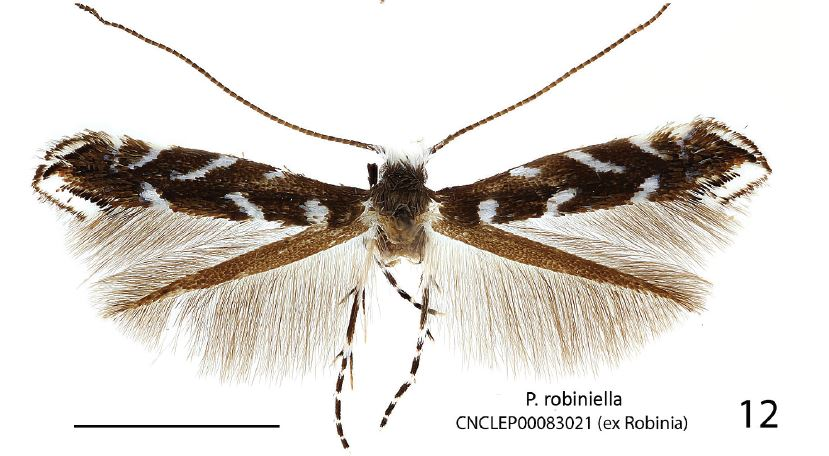

Scientific classification
- Kingdom: Animalia
- Phylum: Arthropoda
- Clade: Pancrustacea
- Class: Insecta
- Order: Lepidoptera
- Family: Gracillariidae
- Genus: Parectopa
- Species: P. robiniella

Binomial name
- Parectopa robiniella Clemens, 1863

= Parectopa robiniella =

Species of moth

Parectopa robiniella, the locust digitate leafminer, is a moth of the family Gracillariidae. It is native to North America, but was accidentally introduced to Italy, where it was first found in 1970. It has now been recorded from Italy, France, Germany, Slovenia, Croatia, Austria, Serbia, Slovakia, Romania, Ukraine and Hungary.

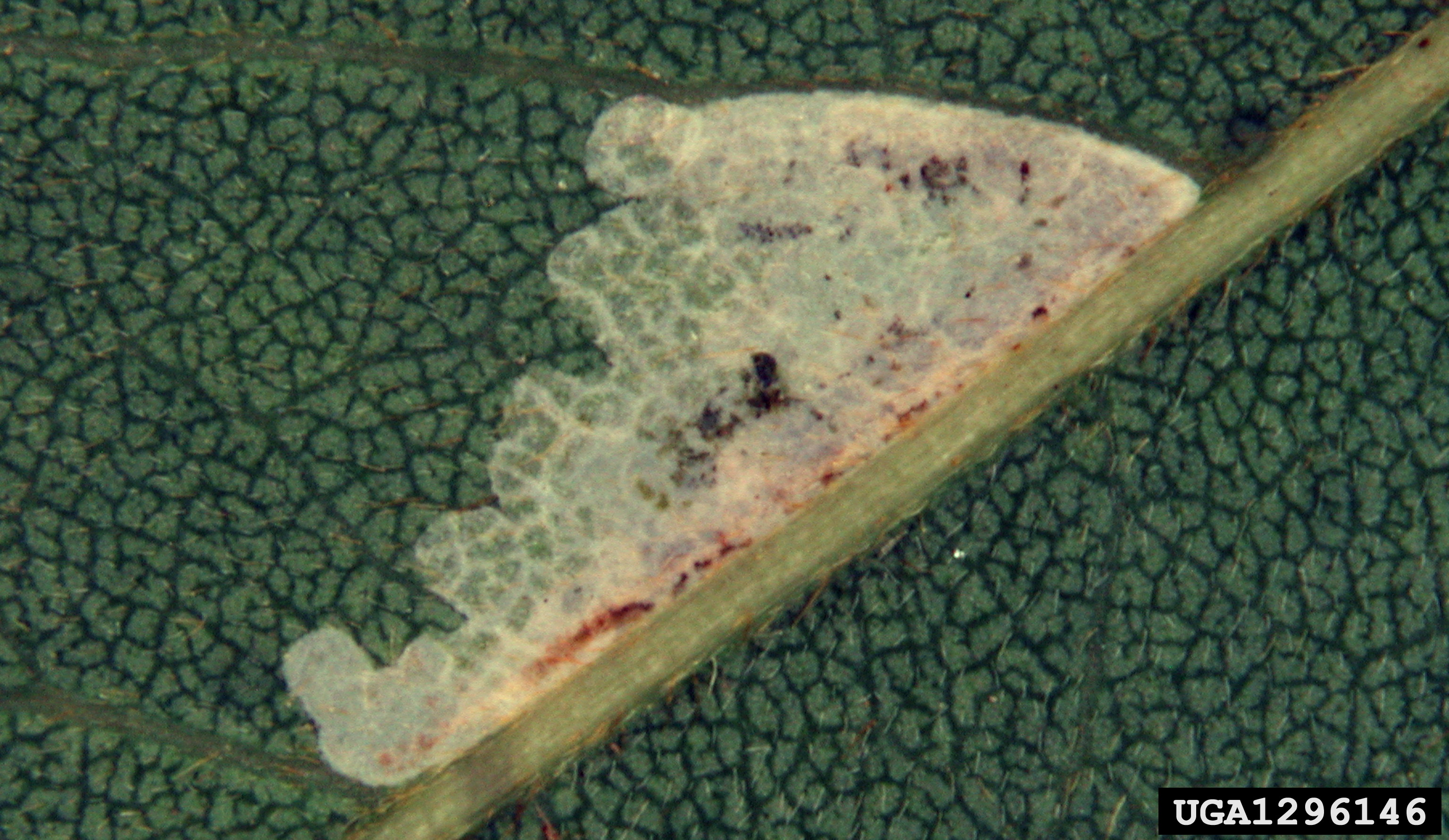
Damage

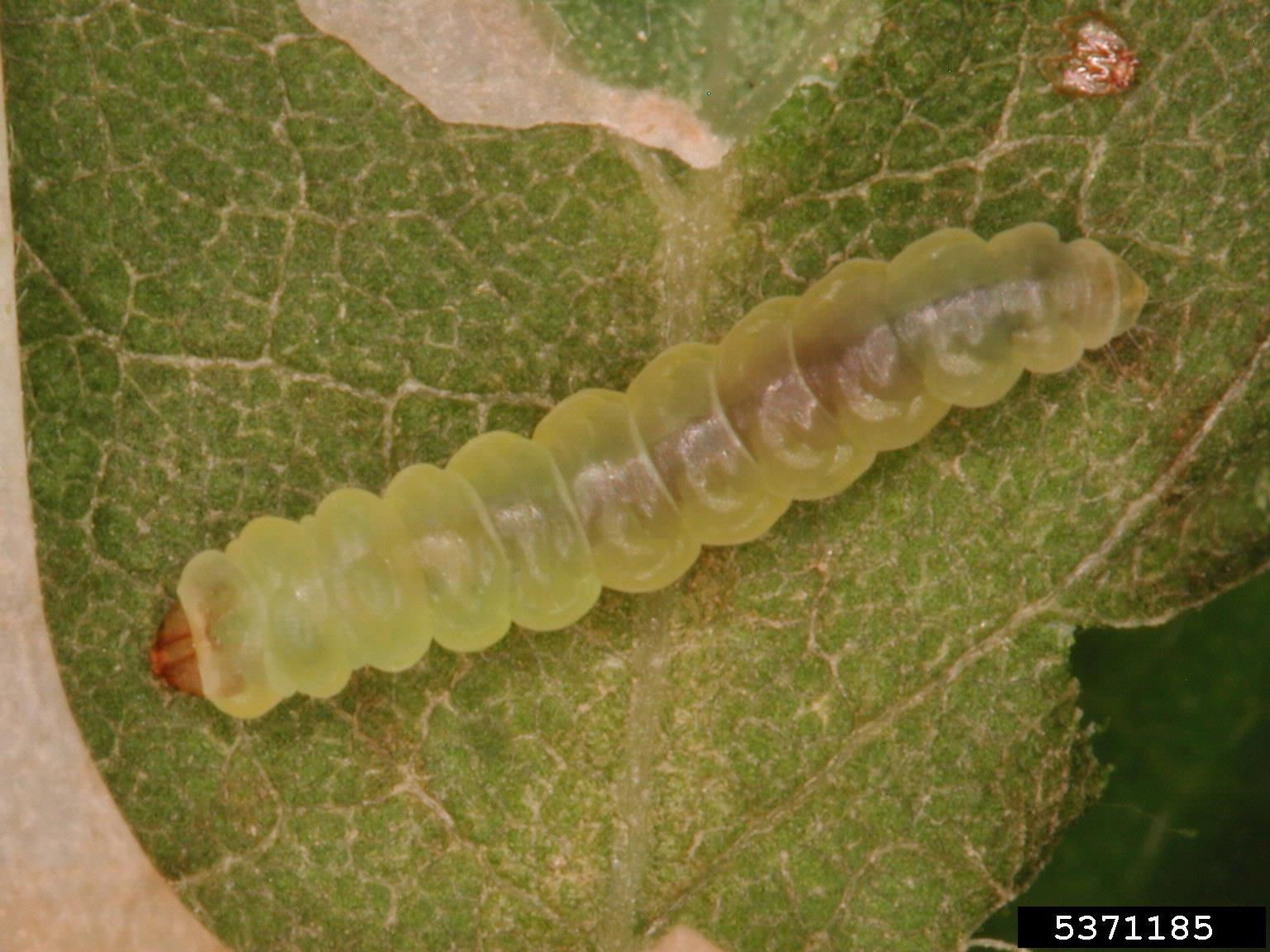
Larva

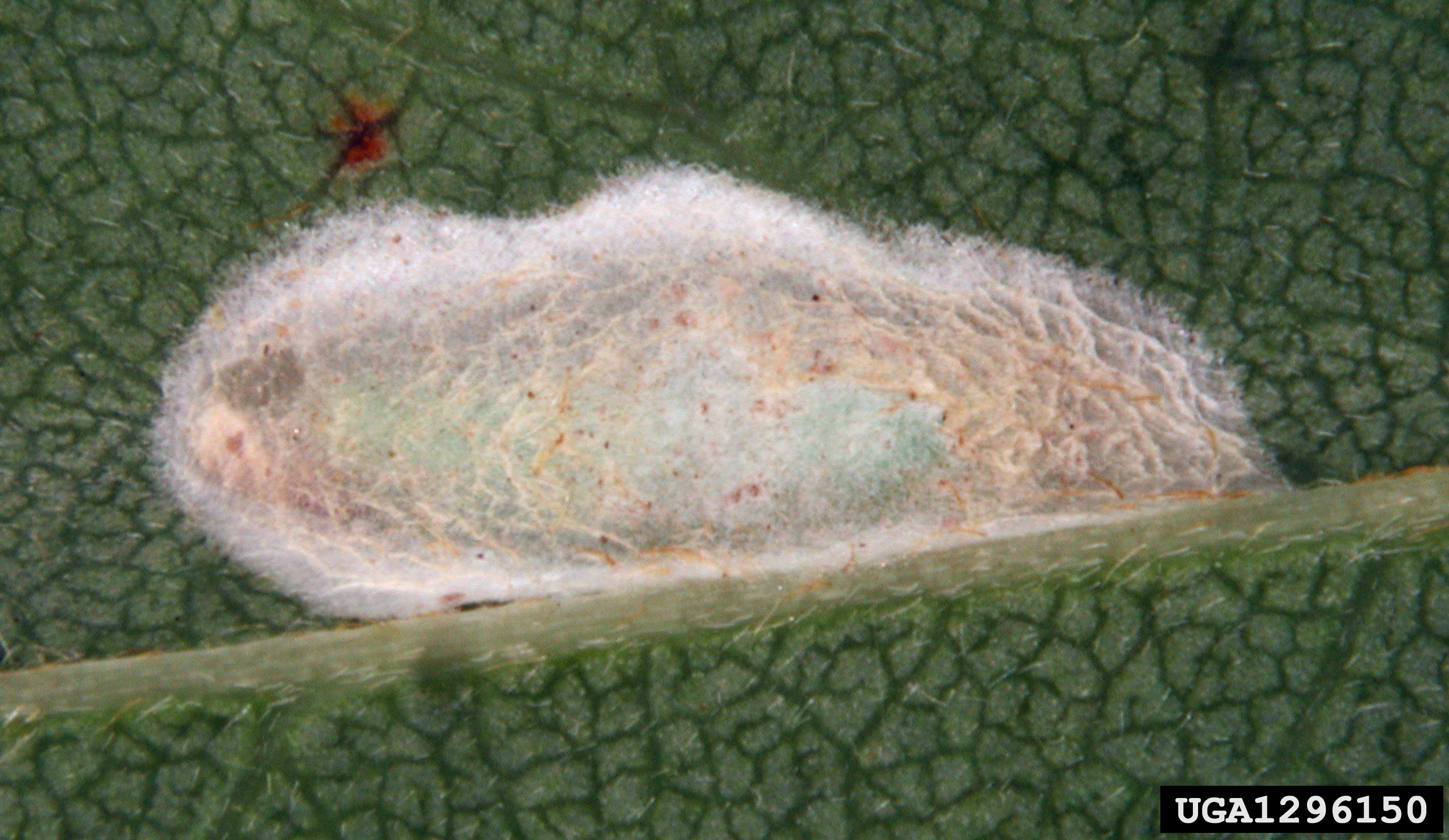
Cocoon

The wingspan is about 5 mm. The moth flies in two to three generations per year in Hungary.

The larvae feed on Robinia species, including Robinia pseudoacacia. It mines the leaves of the host plant.
