= Parectopa lithomacha =

Scientific classification
- Kingdom: Animalia
- Phylum: Arthropoda
- Class: Insecta
- Order: Lepidoptera
- Family: Gracillariidae
- Genus: Parectopa
- Species: P. lithomacha

Binomial name
- Parectopa lithomacha Meyrick, 1915

Species of moth

Parectopa lithomacha is a moth of the family Gracillariidae. It is known from Ecuador.
