= Micrurapteryx parvula =

Scientific classification
- Domain: Eukaryota
- Kingdom: Animalia
- Phylum: Arthropoda
- Class: Insecta
- Order: Lepidoptera
- Family: Gracillariidae
- Genus: Micrurapteryx
- Species: M. parvula

Binomial name
- Micrurapteryx parvula Amsel, 1935

Species of moth

Micrurapteryx parvula is a moth of the family Gracillariidae. It is known from Israel and Jordan.
