= Parectopa thermopsella =

Scientific classification
- Kingdom: Animalia
- Phylum: Arthropoda
- Clade: Pancrustacea
- Class: Insecta
- Order: Lepidoptera
- Family: Gracillariidae
- Genus: Parectopa
- Species: P. thermopsella

Binomial name
- Parectopa thermopsella (Chambers, 1875)

Species of moth

Parectopa thermopsella is a moth of the family Gracillariidae. It is known from the Colorado, United States.

The larvae feed on Thermopsis fabacea var. montana, Thermopsis montana and Thermopsis rhombifolia. They mine the leaves of their host plant. The mine has the form of a flat, irregular mine on the upperside of the leaf.
