= Parectopa exorycha =

Scientific classification
- Kingdom: Animalia
- Phylum: Arthropoda
- Class: Insecta
- Order: Lepidoptera
- Family: Gracillariidae
- Genus: Parectopa
- Species: P. exorycha

Binomial name
- Parectopa exorycha Meyrick, 1928

Species of moth

Parectopa exorycha is a moth of the family Gracillariidae. It is known from Brazil.
