= Micrurapteryx sophorella =

Scientific classification
- Domain: Eukaryota
- Kingdom: Animalia
- Phylum: Arthropoda
- Class: Insecta
- Order: Lepidoptera
- Family: Gracillariidae
- Genus: Micrurapteryx
- Species: M. sophorella

Binomial name
- Micrurapteryx sophorella Kuznetzov, 1979

Species of moth

Micrurapteryx sophorella is a moth of the family Gracillariidae. It is known from Azerbaijan, Kazakhstan, the Caucasus and Uzbekistan.

The larvae feed on Sophora species. They probably mine the leaves of their host plant.
