= Parectopa ophidias =

Scientific classification
- Kingdom: Animalia
- Phylum: Arthropoda
- Class: Insecta
- Order: Lepidoptera
- Family: Gracillariidae
- Genus: Parectopa
- Species: P. ophidias

Binomial name
- Parectopa ophidias (Meyrick, 1907)

Synonyms
- Macarostola ophidias Meyrick, 1907

Species of moth

Parectopa ophidias is a moth of the family Gracillariidae. It is known from South Australia.
