= Parectopa picroglossa =

Scientific classification
- Kingdom: Animalia
- Phylum: Arthropoda
- Class: Insecta
- Order: Lepidoptera
- Family: Gracillariidae
- Genus: Parectopa
- Species: P. picroglossa

Binomial name
- Parectopa picroglossa Meyrick, 1912

Species of moth

Parectopa picroglossa is a moth of the family Gracillariidae. It is known from Sri Lanka.
