= Parectopa refulgens =

Scientific classification
- Kingdom: Animalia
- Phylum: Arthropoda
- Class: Insecta
- Order: Lepidoptera
- Family: Gracillariidae
- Genus: Parectopa
- Species: P. refulgens

Binomial name
- Parectopa refulgens Meyrick, 1915

Species of moth

Parectopa refulgens is a moth of the family Gracillariidae. It is known from Ecuador.
