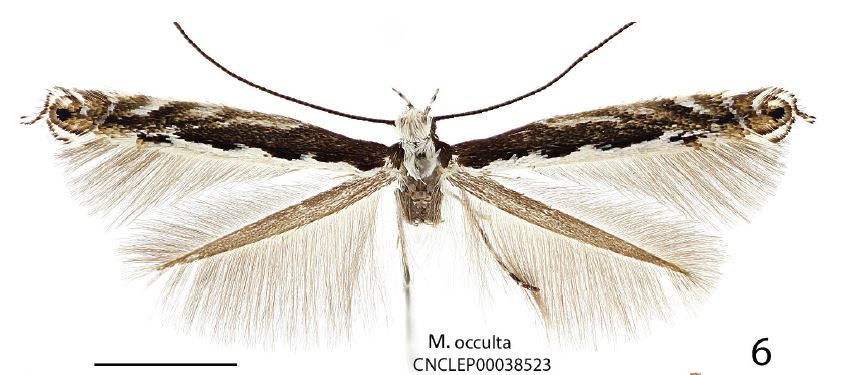

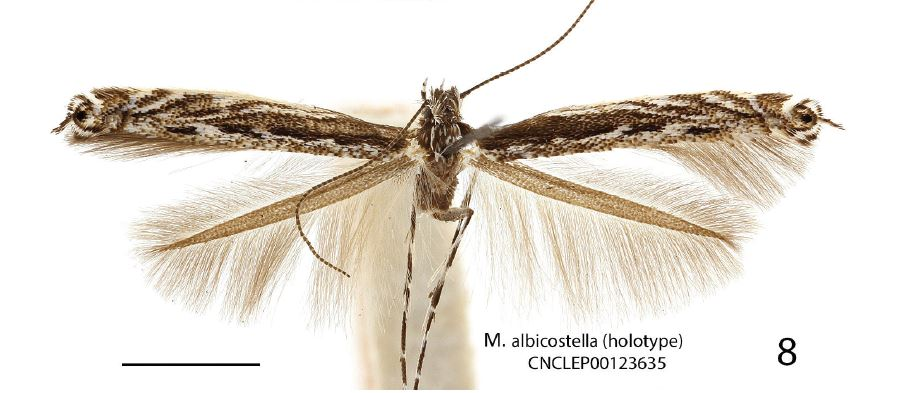

Scientific classification
- Domain: Eukaryota
- Kingdom: Animalia
- Phylum: Arthropoda
- Class: Insecta
- Order: Lepidoptera
- Family: Gracillariidae
- Genus: Micrurapteryx
- Species: M. occulta

Binomial name
- Micrurapteryx occulta (Braun, 1922)

Synonyms
- Parectopa occulta Braun, 1922; Parectopa albicostella Braun, 1925

= Micrurapteryx occulta =

Species of moth

Micrurapteryx occulta is a moth of the family Gracillariidae. It is recorded from across North America in the northern half of the continent, in Canada from the Maritime Provinces (Newfoundland, New Brunswick, Nova Scotia) to British Columbia, north to northernmost Yukon. In the United States it has been found in Connecticut, Kentucky, Illinois, Colorado, Utah, Nevada, and California. The habitat consists of meadows, the edge of forests, open ponderosa pine forests, alpine meadows, the sea shore, and probably other habitats, from sea level to high elevations in the mountains, where suitable hosts occur.

The wingspan is 8.7–11.7 mm. The forewing pattern is very similar to that of Micrurapteryx gradatella, but rather variable: in several specimens, the dark portion of disk has pale-based, dark-tipped scales giving the appearance of pale suffusion. The white dorsal margin in some specimens is obscured by suffusion of dark-tipped scales and the terminal portion between strigulae 4 and 5 and around the apical spot is rufous in specimens with white costa and margin. The forewings of darker specimens have an overall peppery appearance.

The larvae feed on Lathyrus japonicus, Melilotus albus, Vicia caroliniana, Lupinus and Caragana species. They mine the leaves of their host plant. The mine has the form of an irregular, somewhat digitate greenish mine, starting over the midrib, where the mine is whitish.
