= Parectopa bosquella =

Scientific classification
- Kingdom: Animalia
- Phylum: Arthropoda
- Clade: Pancrustacea
- Class: Insecta
- Order: Lepidoptera
- Family: Gracillariidae
- Genus: Parectopa
- Species: P. bosquella

Binomial name
- Parectopa bosquella (Chambers, 1876)

Synonyms
- Parectopa basquella (Chambers, 1876)

Species of moth

Parectopa bosquella is a moth of the family Gracillariidae. It is known from the US state of Texas. It was described by Vactor Tousey Chambers in 1876.
