= Parectopa rotigera =

Scientific classification
- Kingdom: Animalia
- Phylum: Arthropoda
- Class: Insecta
- Order: Lepidoptera
- Family: Gracillariidae
- Genus: Parectopa
- Species: P. rotigera

Binomial name
- Parectopa rotigera Meyrick, 1931

Species of moth

Parectopa rotigera is a moth of the family Gracillariidae. It is known from Chile.
