= Micrurapteryx tortuosella =

Scientific classification
- Domain: Eukaryota
- Kingdom: Animalia
- Phylum: Arthropoda
- Class: Insecta
- Order: Lepidoptera
- Family: Gracillariidae
- Genus: Micrurapteryx
- Species: M. tortuosella

Binomial name
- Micrurapteryx tortuosella Kuznetzov & Tristan, 1985

Species of moth

Micrurapteryx tortuosella is a moth of the family Gracillariidae. It is known from Kyrgyzstan and Tajikistan.

The larvae feed on Lathyrus species (including Lathyrus odoratus), Medicago species (including Medicago sativa) and Melilotus species. They mine the leaves of their host plant.
