= Parectopa nesitis =

Scientific classification
- Kingdom: Animalia
- Phylum: Arthropoda
- Clade: Pancrustacea
- Class: Insecta
- Order: Lepidoptera
- Family: Gracillariidae
- Genus: Parectopa
- Species: P. nesitis

Binomial name
- Parectopa nesitis (Walsingham, 1897)

Species of moth

Parectopa nesitis is a moth of the family Gracillariidae. It is known from Saint Thomas in the United States Virgin Islands.
