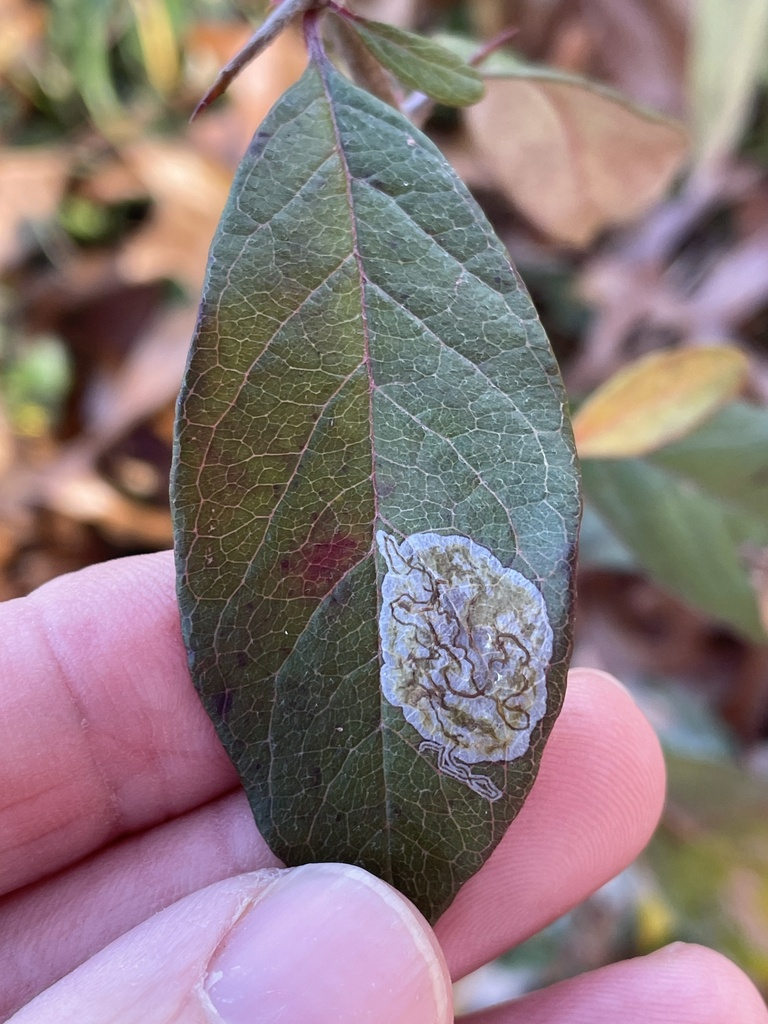

Scientific classification
- Kingdom: Animalia
- Phylum: Arthropoda
- Clade: Pancrustacea
- Class: Insecta
- Order: Lepidoptera
- Family: Gracillariidae
- Genus: Parectopa
- Species: P. bumeliella

Binomial name
- Parectopa bumeliella Braun, 1939

= Parectopa bumeliella =

Species of moth

Parectopa bumeliella is a moth of the family Gracillariidae. It is known from Kentucky and Arkansas in the United States. It was described by Annette Frances Braun in 1939.

The host plants for the species include Sideroxylon lanuginosum and Sideroxylon lycioides. These plants typically occur in forest edges, scrublands and, dry to moist woodlands. They mine the leaves of their host plant.
