= Parectopa clethrata =

Scientific classification
- Domain: Eukaryota
- Kingdom: Animalia
- Phylum: Arthropoda
- Class: Insecta
- Order: Lepidoptera
- Family: Gracillariidae
- Genus: Parectopa
- Species: P. clethrata

Binomial name
- Parectopa clethrata Lower, 1923

Species of moth

Parectopa clethrata is a moth of the family Gracillariidae. It is known from South Australia.
