= Parectopa toxomacha =

Scientific classification
- Kingdom: Animalia
- Phylum: Arthropoda
- Class: Insecta
- Order: Lepidoptera
- Family: Gracillariidae
- Genus: Parectopa
- Species: P. toxomacha

Binomial name
- Parectopa toxomacha (Meyrick, 1882)

Synonyms
- Gracilaria toxomacha Meyrick, 1882

Species of moth

Parectopa toxomacha is a moth of the family Gracillariidae. It is known from New South Wales, Australia.

The larvae feed on Pultenaea species, including Pultenaea daphnoides. They probably mine the leaves of their host plant.
