= Micrurapteryx bidentata =

Scientific classification
- Domain: Eukaryota
- Kingdom: Animalia
- Phylum: Arthropoda
- Class: Insecta
- Order: Lepidoptera
- Family: Gracillariidae
- Genus: Micrurapteryx
- Species: M. bidentata

Binomial name
- Micrurapteryx bidentata Noreika, 1992

Species of moth

Micrurapteryx bidentata is a moth of the family Gracillariidae. It is known from Kyrgyzstan.
