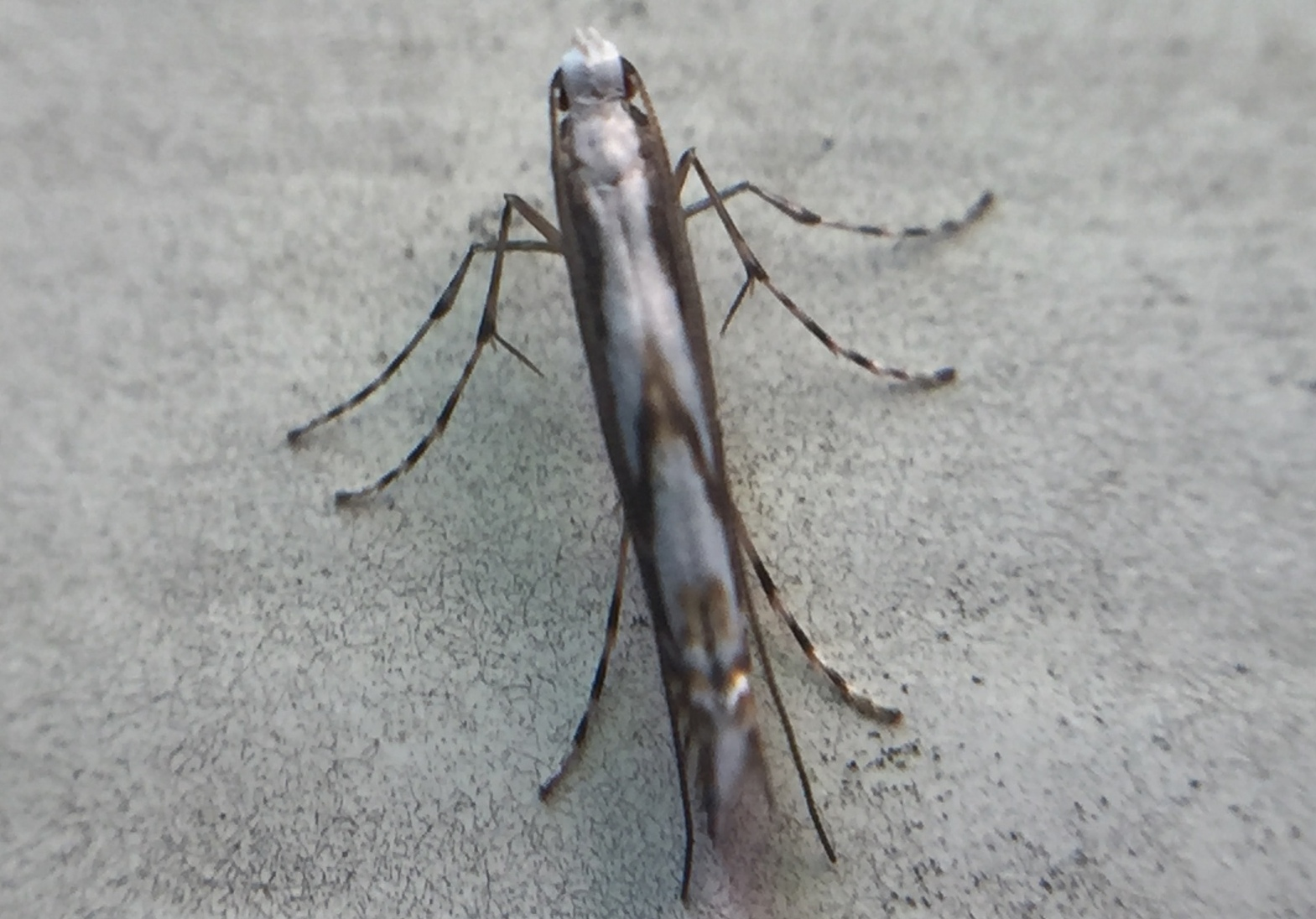

Scientific classification
- Kingdom: Animalia
- Phylum: Arthropoda
- Clade: Pancrustacea
- Class: Insecta
- Order: Lepidoptera
- Family: Gracillariidae
- Genus: Acrocercops
- Species: A. leucocyma

Binomial name
- Acrocercops leucocyma (Meyrick, 1889)

Synonyms
- Gracilaria leucocyma Meyrick, 1889; Parectopa leucocyma (Meyrick, 1889)

= Acrocercops leucocyma =

Species of moth

Acrocercops leucocyma, also known as the kauri leafminer, is a species of moth in the family Gracillariidae. It is endemic to New Zealand.

== Taxonomy ==
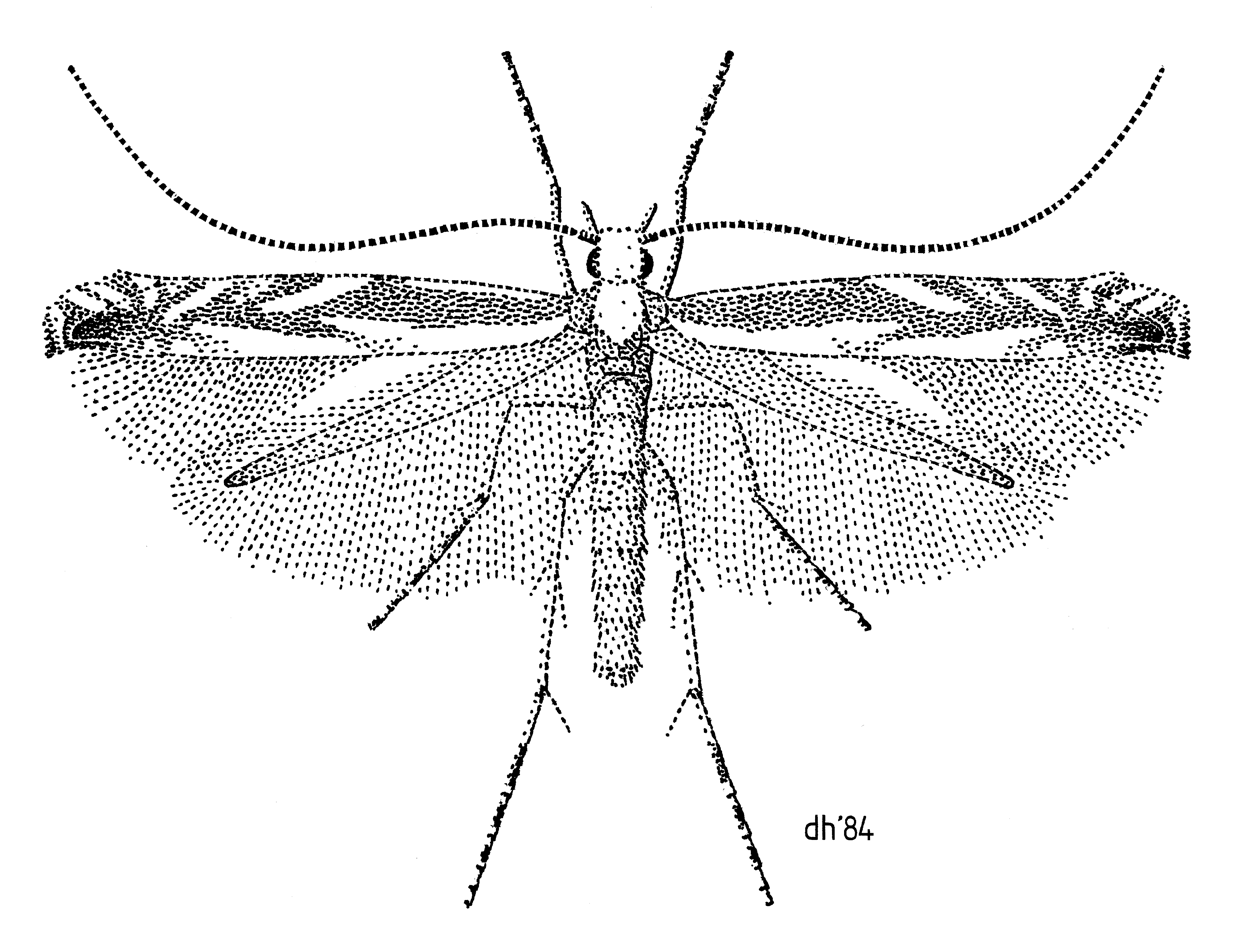
Illustration by Des Helmore

This species was described by Edward Meyrick in 1889 using a specimen he collected in the Waitakere Range in Auckland and named Gracilaria leucocyma. George Hudson discussed this species under the name Parectopa laucocyma in his 1928 publication The Butterflies and Moths of New Zealand. The specimen collected by Meyrick was the only recorded specimen until this species was rediscovered in 1954 by K. A. J. Wise. In 1961 Lajos Vári restricted the genus Parectopa to Holarctic species which do not have genital characteristics that resemble New Zealand species. As a result, John S. Dugdale placed this species in the genus Acrocercops. However the genus level classification of Acrocercops leucocyma is regarded as unsatisfactory and as such the species is currently also known as Acrocercops (s.l.) leucocyma. The holotype specimen is held at the Natural History Museum, London.

== Description ==
Meyrick described this species as follows:

♀︎. 9mm. Head and palpi white. Antennae fuscous, beneath white. Thorax light grey. Abdomen whitish. Legs dark grey, ringed with white, posterior tibiae white. Fore-wings elongate, very narrow, pointed; grey; markings snow-white; a rather broad irregular streak along inner margin from base to apex, interrupted before middle by a very oblique indistinct line of ground-colour; eight short more or less wedge-shaped streaks from costa, first from 1/4, slenderly produced on costa towards base, first four outwardly oblique, remainder inwardly oblique, second and fourth reaching half across wing, the rest much shorter; a small irregular blackish apical dot, preceded by a white dot : cilia ochreous-grey-whitish, round apex whiter, with indications of two dark fuscous lines. Hindwings whitish-grey; cilia ochreous-grey-whitish.

== Distribution ==
This species is endemic to New Zealand.

== Biology and life cycle ==
The adult moths of this species are on the wing in spring and summer.

== Habitat and host species ==
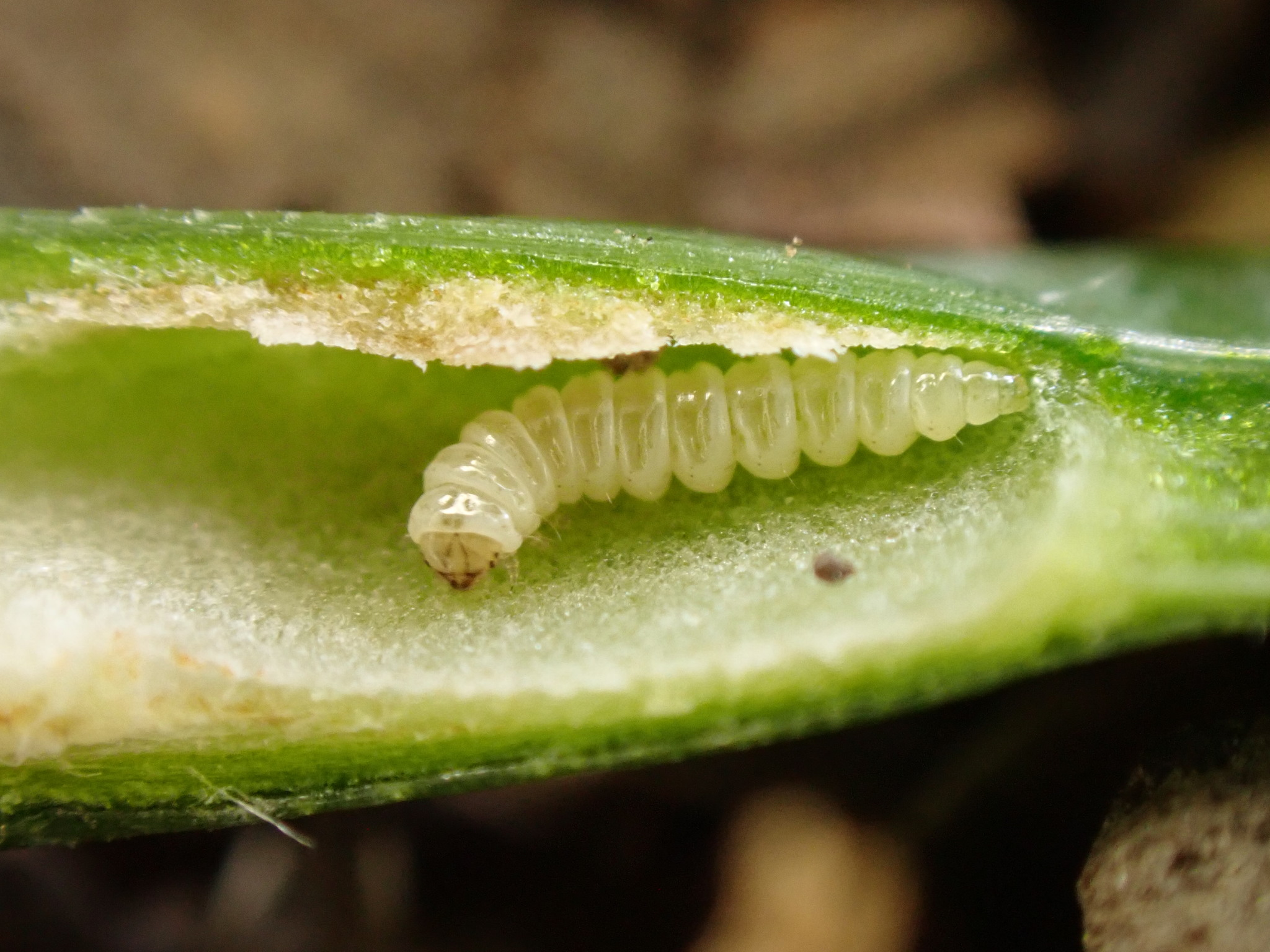
Acrocercops leucocyma larva feeding on a kauri leaf

The larvae feed on Agathis australis. They mine the leaves of their host plant.
