= Mount Ord (Arizona) =

Landform in Arizona

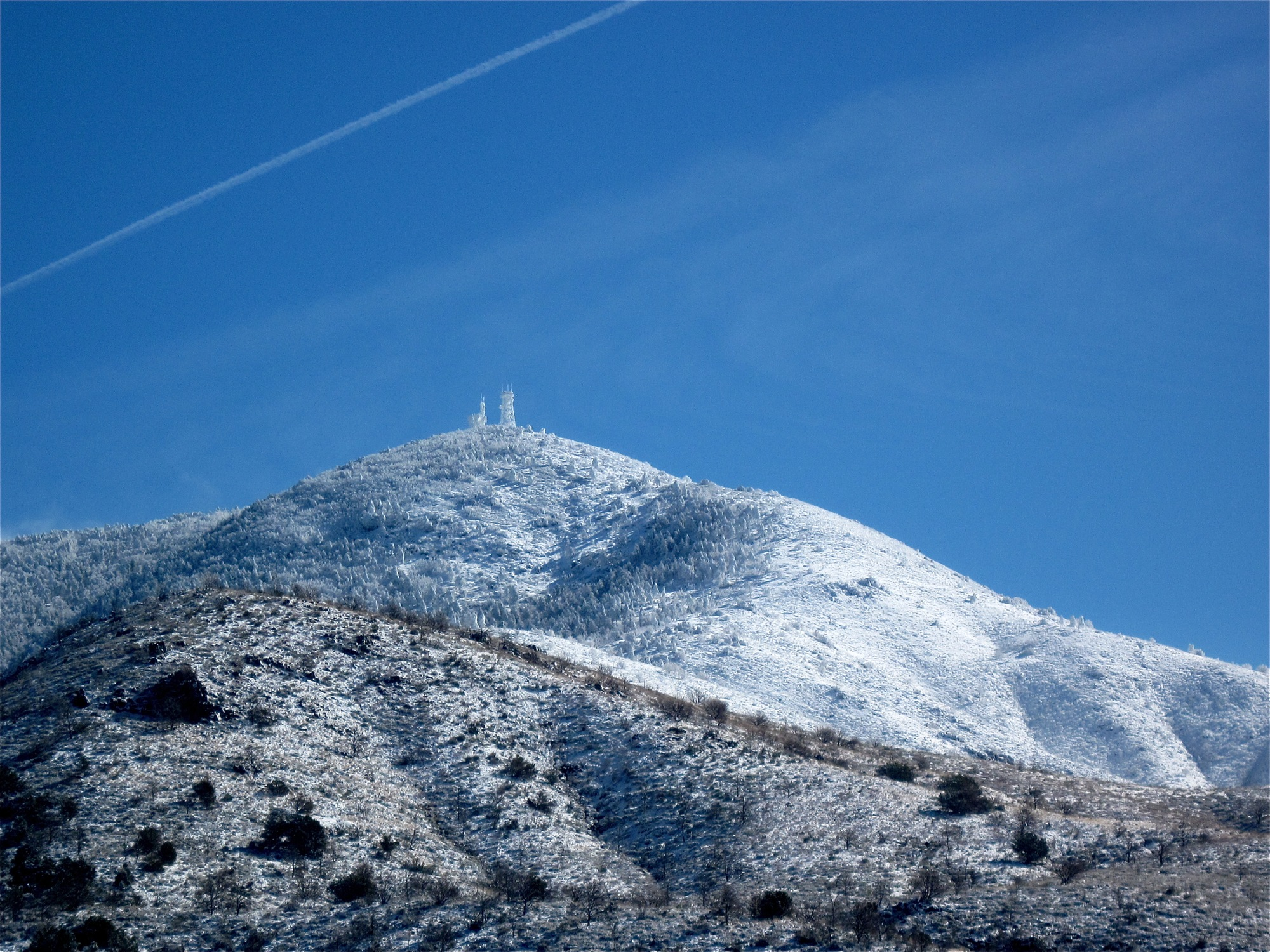
- Mount Ord covered in snow

Highest point
- Elevation: 7,128 ft (2,173 m)
- Coordinates: 33°54′18″N 111°24′33″W

Geography
- Location within Arizona
- Location: Maricopa County, Arizona, U.S.
- Parent range: Mazatzal Mountains

Mount Ord is a mountain summit located in the Tonto National Forest on the northeastern edge of Maricopa County, Arizona in the Mazatzal mountain range. Its height is 7,128 feet (2,173 m). The county line dividing Maricopa County, Arizona and Gila County, Arizona passes across the summit of the peak.

Mount Ord is not to be confused with the peak of Mount Baldy, Arizona, located in Apache County and also referred to by some sources as "Mount Ord". Mount Ord is named after Major General Edward Ord.

The top of Mount Ord is home to a collection of communications towers. The mountain is popular with birdwatchers because its geography and habitat attract a concentration of all of the species of mountain warbler birds that exist in Arizona, including the Virginia's, Black-throated Gray, Grace's, Olive, and Painted Redstart—the only location in central Arizona where these conditions exist.

== See also ==
- List of mountains and hills of Arizona by height
