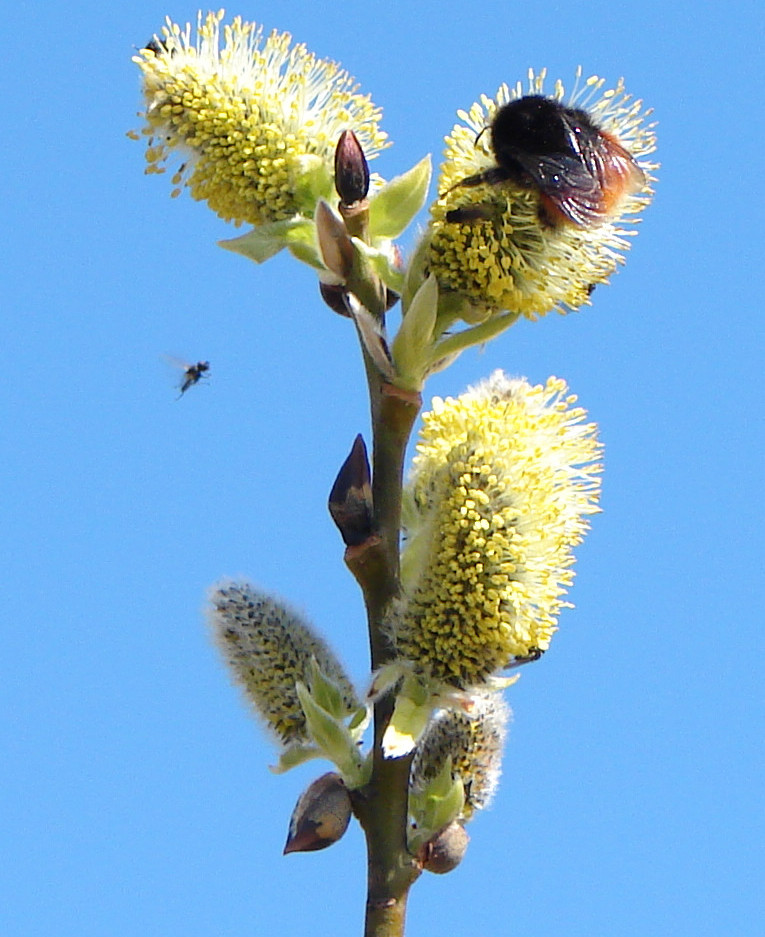

Conservation status
- Least Concern (IUCN 3.1)

- Apparently Secure (NatureServe)

Scientific classification
- Kingdom: Plantae
- Clade: Tracheophytes
- Clade: Angiosperms
- Clade: Eudicots
- Clade: Rosids
- Order: Malpighiales
- Family: Salicaceae
- Genus: Salix
- Species: S. monticola

Binomial name
- Salix monticola L.

Synonyms
- Salix amelanchieroides; Salix dissymetrica; Salix padophylla; Salix sawatchicola

= Salix monticola =

Species of flowering plant

Salix monticola is a species of flowering plant in the willow family known by the common names mountain willow, cherry willow, serviceberry willow, and park willow. It is native to the United States, where it occurs in the Rocky Mountains region from Wyoming to Arizona and New Mexico. It also occurs in Alaska and parts of Canada.

This willow is quite variable in appearance, depending on environmental conditions. It grows to 4–6 m (13–20 ft) in dense clumps. The branches are yellowish or reddish-brown, mottled with green. The leaves are lance-shaped to oval and are up to 9.5 cm (3.7 in) long. They have smooth, wavy, or toothed edges. The species is dioecious, with male and female reproductive parts occurring on separate plants. The flowers are often pollinated by bees. The seeds are viable for a short time, but germinate immediately on landing on an appropriate moist substrate.

This plant is common on the riverbanks of Arctic Alaska and Yukon. It forms thickets on floodplains where recent deposits of soil have been washed down by floodwaters. In western Colorado, it may be a dominant or codominant species in riparian zones. It often forms thickets along waterways.

This plant is an important food source for many types of animals, such as moose and ptarmigan. Honey bees use the pollen and nectar.
