= Mount Baldy (Arizona) =

Mountain in Apache County, Arizona, United States

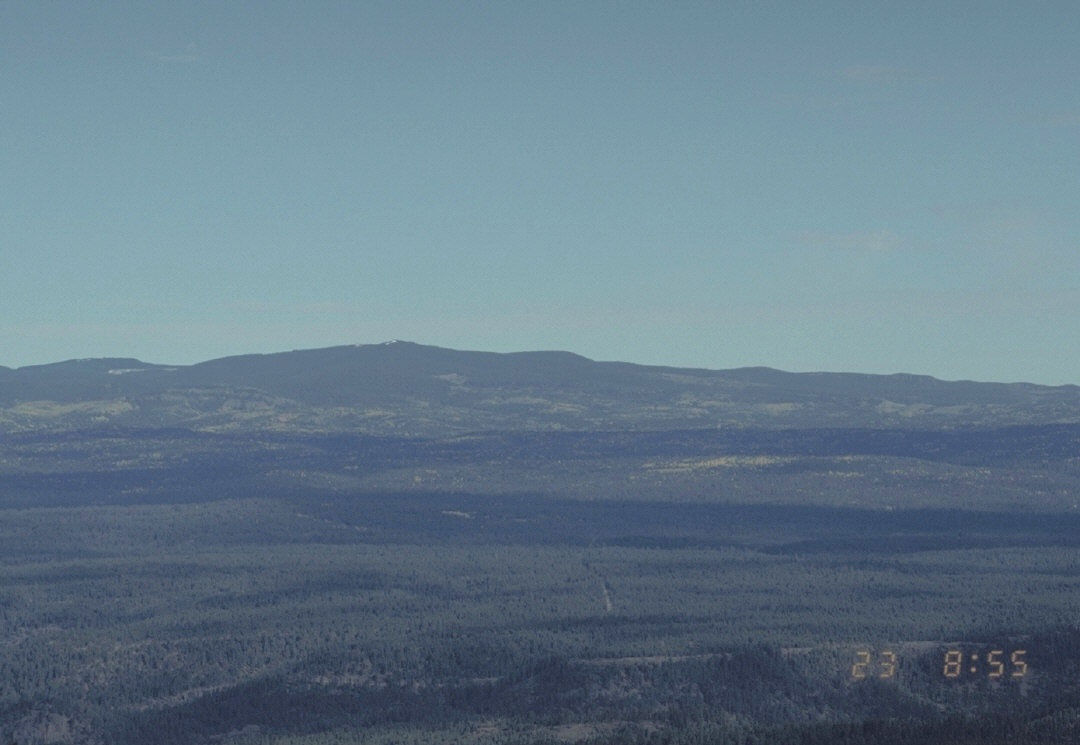
- Mount Baldy from a US Forest Service webcam

Highest point
- Elevation: 11,409 ft (3,477 m) NAVD 88
- Prominence: 4,723 ft (1,440 m)
- Listing: North America isolated peaks 81st; Arizona county high point
- Coordinates: 33°54′21″N 109°33′45″W

Geography
- Location within Arizona
- Location: Apache County, Arizona, U.S.
- Parent range: White Mountains
- Topo map: USGS Mount Baldy (AZ)

Geology
- Mountain type: Stratovolcano
- Last eruption: 2 million years ago

Mount Baldy (Western Apache: Dził Łigai White Mountain) is an extinct stratovolcano in eastern Arizona in the United States. With a summit elevation of 11,409 feet (3,477 m), the peak of Mount Baldy rises above the tree line and is left largely bare of vegetation, lending the mountain its current name. The Mount Baldy Wilderness occupies the eastern slope of the mountain and is managed by the Apache-Sitgreaves National Forest.

The summit of Mount Baldy is within the Fort Apache Indian Reservation. It is the highest point in the White Mountains and Apache County. It is the fifth-highest point in the state, and the highest outside the San Francisco Peaks in the Flagstaff area. An unnamed sub-peak with an elevation of 10,890 feet (3,319 m) exists approximately 0.5 miles (0.8 km) to the north of the summit that is off reservation and accessible to the public via maintained trail. A third peak, Ord Peak, sits about three miles northwest of Baldy Peak, not to be confused with Mount Ord in Gila County.

Mount Baldy is one of the most sacred mountains to the Apache of Arizona. The Western Apache of Arizona inhabited the areas within their four most sacred mountain ranges: the White Mountains of Eastern Arizona, the Pinaleno Mountains near the town of Safford in southeastern Arizona, the Four Peaks near the City of Phoenix and the San Francisco Peaks near Flagstaff.

When Captain George M. Wheeler visited the mountaintop in 1873, he described the view as "The most magnificent and effective of any among the large number that have come under my observation". Wheeler named the mountain Mount Thomas after General Lorenzo Thomas, who fought in the Mexican–American War. It later became Mount Baldy. The name Mount Thomas has been assigned to a nearby peak by the U.S. Geological Survey.

Mount Baldy also contains the headwaters of the Little Colorado River and Salt River and produces the most abundant trout fishing streams in Arizona. No other mountain in Arizona produces as many rivers and streams. Along its slope are numerous man made lakes. The area around Mount Baldy also averages the most abundant precipitation in Arizona. Wildlife is abundant on the mountain and includes the recently introduced Mexican Grey Wolf.

While looking northeast from Historic Fort Apache (elevation 5,290 ft (1,610 m)), Mount Baldy rises 6,130 ft (1,870 m) in elevation.

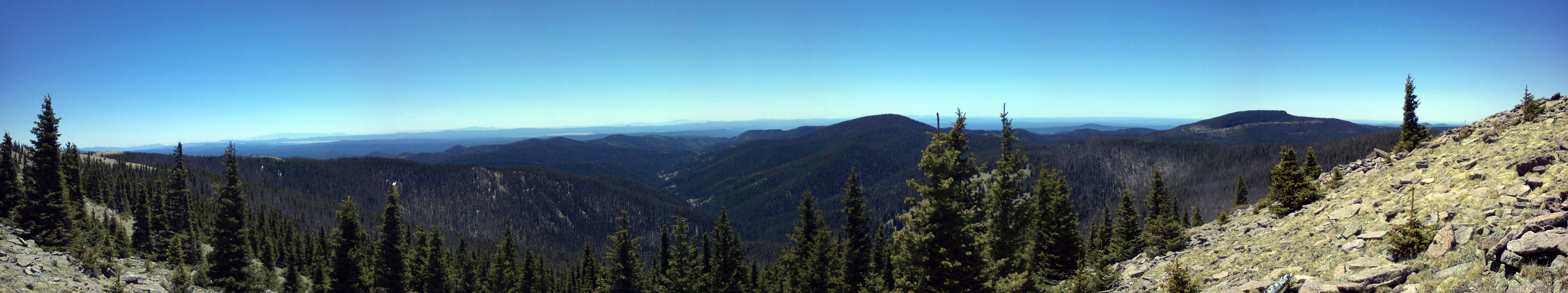
View from the summit of Mount Baldy, looking west

== Climate ==
Climate data for Mount Baldy 33.9103 N, 109.5662 W, Elevation: 11,096 ft (3,382 m) (1991–2020 normals)
Month	Jan	Feb	Mar	Apr	May	Jun	Jul	Aug	Sep	Oct	Nov	Dec	Year
Mean daily maximum °F (°C)	36.2 (2.3)	37.0 (2.8)	41.3 (5.2)	47.1 (8.4)	55.2 (12.9)	65.8 (18.8)	66.9 (19.4)	64.6 (18.1)	60.6 (15.9)	53.2 (11.8)	43.6 (6.4)	36.4 (2.4)	50.7 (10.4)
Daily mean °F (°C)	24.3 (−4.3)	24.7 (−4.1)	28.4 (−2.0)	33.4 (0.8)	41.5 (5.3)	51.3 (10.7)	53.8 (12.1)	52.2 (11.2)	47.9 (8.8)	39.9 (4.4)	31.6 (−0.2)	24.8 (−4.0)	37.8 (3.2)
Mean daily minimum °F (°C)	12.4 (−10.9)	12.4 (−10.9)	15.5 (−9.2)	19.7 (−6.8)	27.8 (−2.3)	36.7 (2.6)	40.6 (4.8)	39.9 (4.4)	35.1 (1.7)	26.6 (−3.0)	19.5 (−6.9)	13.2 (−10.4)	25.0 (−3.9)
Average precipitation inches (mm)	3.72 (94)	3.18 (81)	4.45 (113)	2.08 (53)	1.01 (26)	0.88 (22)	6.24 (158)	6.27 (159)	3.37 (86)	2.33 (59)	2.18 (55)	3.42 (87)	39.13 (993)
Source: PRISM Climate Group

Climate data for Mount Baldy, Arizona (station elevation 9,370 ft)
Month	Jan	Feb	Mar	Apr	May	Jun	Jul	Aug	Sep	Oct	Nov	Dec	Year
Record high °F (°C)	58 (14)	58 (14)	59 (15)	68 (20)	75 (24)	83 (28)	80 (27)	79 (26)	75 (24)	75 (24)	65 (18)	60 (16)	83 (28)
Mean daily maximum °F (°C)	37.9 (3.3)	39.3 (4.1)	41.9 (5.5)	49.6 (9.8)	60.4 (15.8)	68.8 (20.4)	69.6 (20.9)	67.7 (19.8)	64.7 (18.2)	57.1 (13.9)	45.9 (7.7)	40.3 (4.6)	53.6 (12.0)
Mean daily minimum °F (°C)	9.2 (−12.7)	10.0 (−12.2)	16.1 (−8.8)	21.4 (−5.9)	27.7 (−2.4)	35.6 (2.0)	40.8 (4.9)	37.5 (3.1)	34.0 (1.1)	26.9 (−2.8)	17.3 (−8.2)	11.9 (−11.2)	24.0 (−4.4)
Record low °F (°C)	−26 (−32)	−19 (−28)	−9 (−23)	−9 (−23)	9 (−13)	16 (−9)	28 (−2)	27 (−3)	19 (−7)	−5 (−21)	−16 (−27)	−20 (−29)	−26 (−32)
Average precipitation inches (mm)	3.10 (79)	2.76 (70)	4.09 (104)	1.45 (37)	0.82 (21)	0.90 (23)	4.85 (123)	4.20 (107)	2.84 (72)	2.08 (53)	1.68 (43)	2.68 (68)	31.47 (799)
Average snowfall inches (cm)	40.4 (103)	37.5 (95)	42.9 (109)	16.0 (41)	2.8 (7.1)	trace	0 (0)	0 (0)	0.1 (0.25)	3.1 (7.9)	15.7 (40)	29.4 (75)	188 (480)
Source: The Western Regional Climate Center

== Geology ==
Mount Baldy is volcanic in origin. It is described as a stratovolcano that last erupted 2 million years ago.

== See also ==
- List of mountains and hills of Arizona by height
