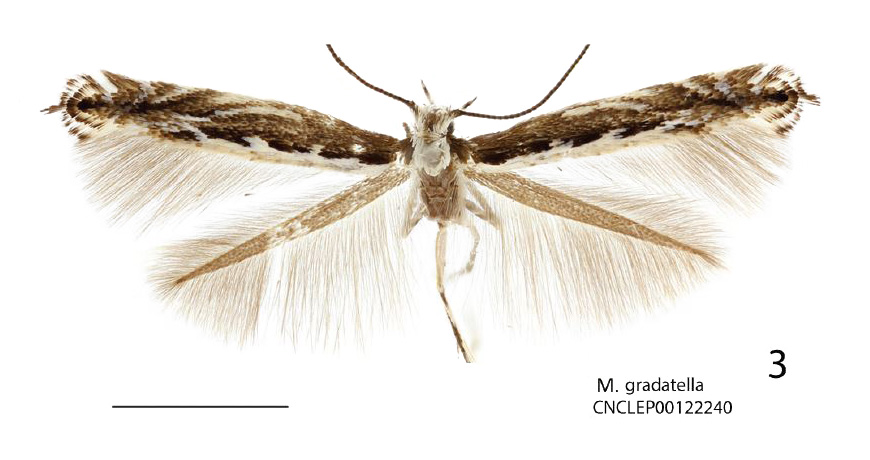

Scientific classification
- Domain: Eukaryota
- Kingdom: Animalia
- Phylum: Arthropoda
- Class: Insecta
- Order: Lepidoptera
- Family: Gracillariidae
- Genus: Micrurapteryx
- Species: M. gradatella

Binomial name
- Micrurapteryx gradatella (Herrich-Schäffer, 1855)

Synonyms
- Euspilapteryx gradatella Herrich-Schäffer, 1855

= Micrurapteryx gradatella =

Species of moth

Micrurapteryx gradatella is a moth of the family Gracillariidae. It is found from Fennoscandia to the Iberian Peninsula, the Alps and Romania and from Germany to central Russia, as well as in Tajikistan, the Urals, Siberia, and the Russian Far East.

The wingspan is 9.5–11.5 mm. The forewings are dark brown in ground colour with white markings and the costal margin with five white strigulae, the first three almost parallel, oblique and bent outwards and the first costal strigula with the basal half parallel to the costa, then oblique and fragmented. The second often obsolescent and the fourth and fifth semicircular, often both touching the opposite margin. The dorsal margin is white in the basal two-thirds, with two or three white projections, the more distal one almost touching the first costal strigula and the apical spot black, not quite touching the fifth strigula. The hindwings are grey ochreous.

The larvae feed on Lathyrus linifolius, Lathyrus tuberosus and Vicia sepium. They mine the leaves of their host plant.

== Gallery ==
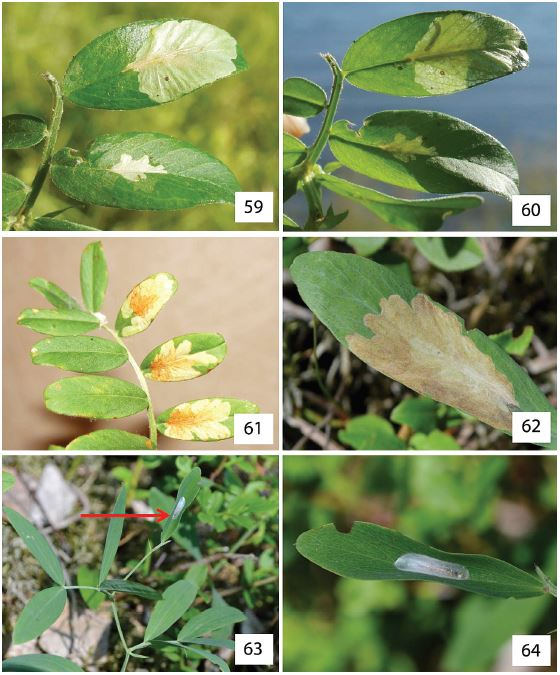
Life history of Micrurapteryx gradatella in Eurasia. 59–60 mines on Vicia amoena 61 abandoned mines on Vicia amoena 62 blotch mines on upperside of the leaves 63–64 pupation on the upperside of the leaf and the cocoon on Lathyrus linifolius. Collection sites: 59–60 Russia, Krasnoyarsk, Yenisei river bank, near village Borovoe, 5.VII.2015 61 Russia, Krasnoyarsk, Yenisei river bank, near Karaulnaya, 26.VI.2015 63–64 Finland, Turku, 18.VI.2014.
