= List of Salicales of Montana =

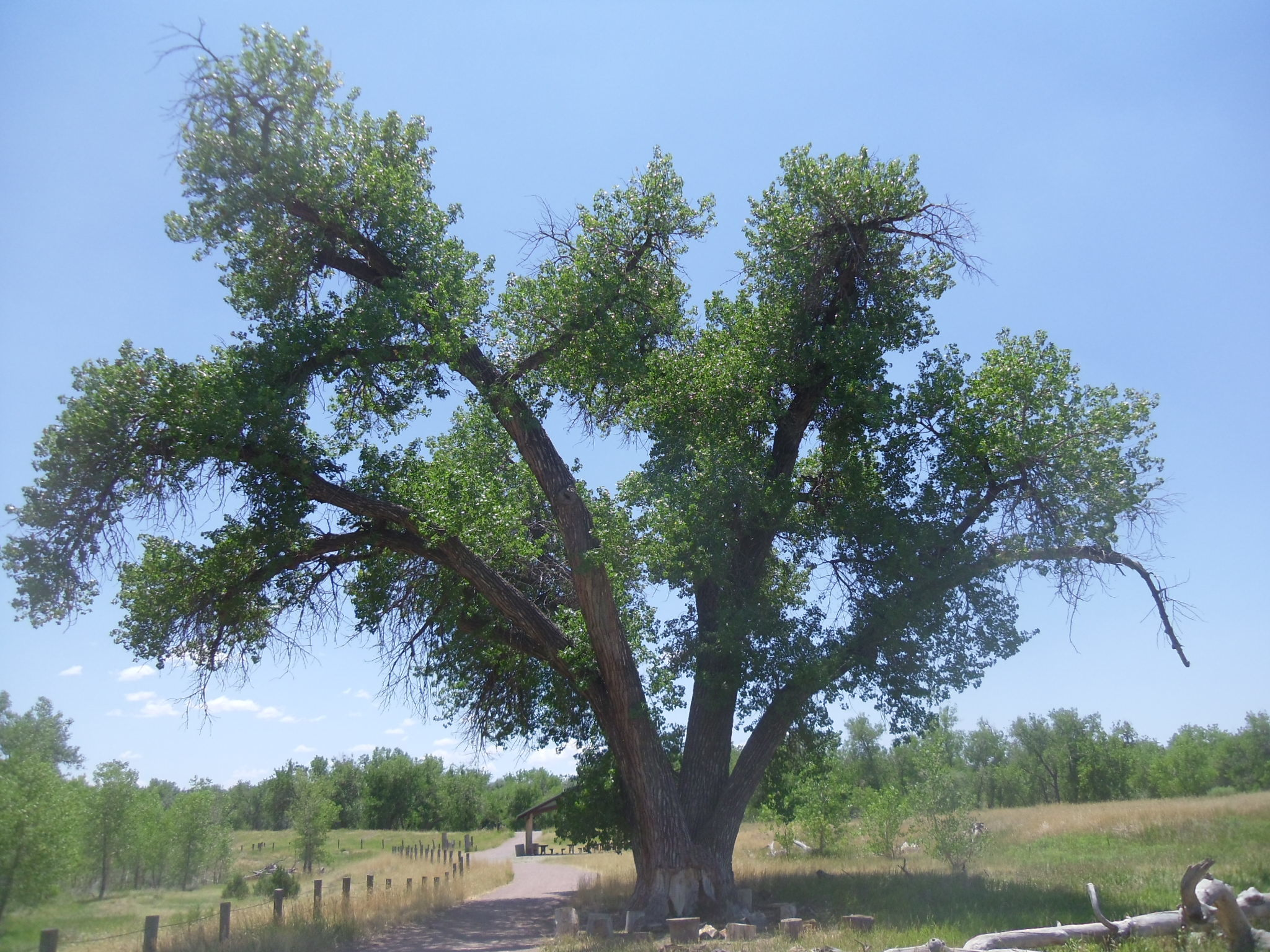
Eastern cottonwood, Populus deltoides

There are at least 48 members of the poplar and willow order, Salicales, found in Montana. Some of these species are exotics (not native to Montana) and some species have been designated as Species of Concern.

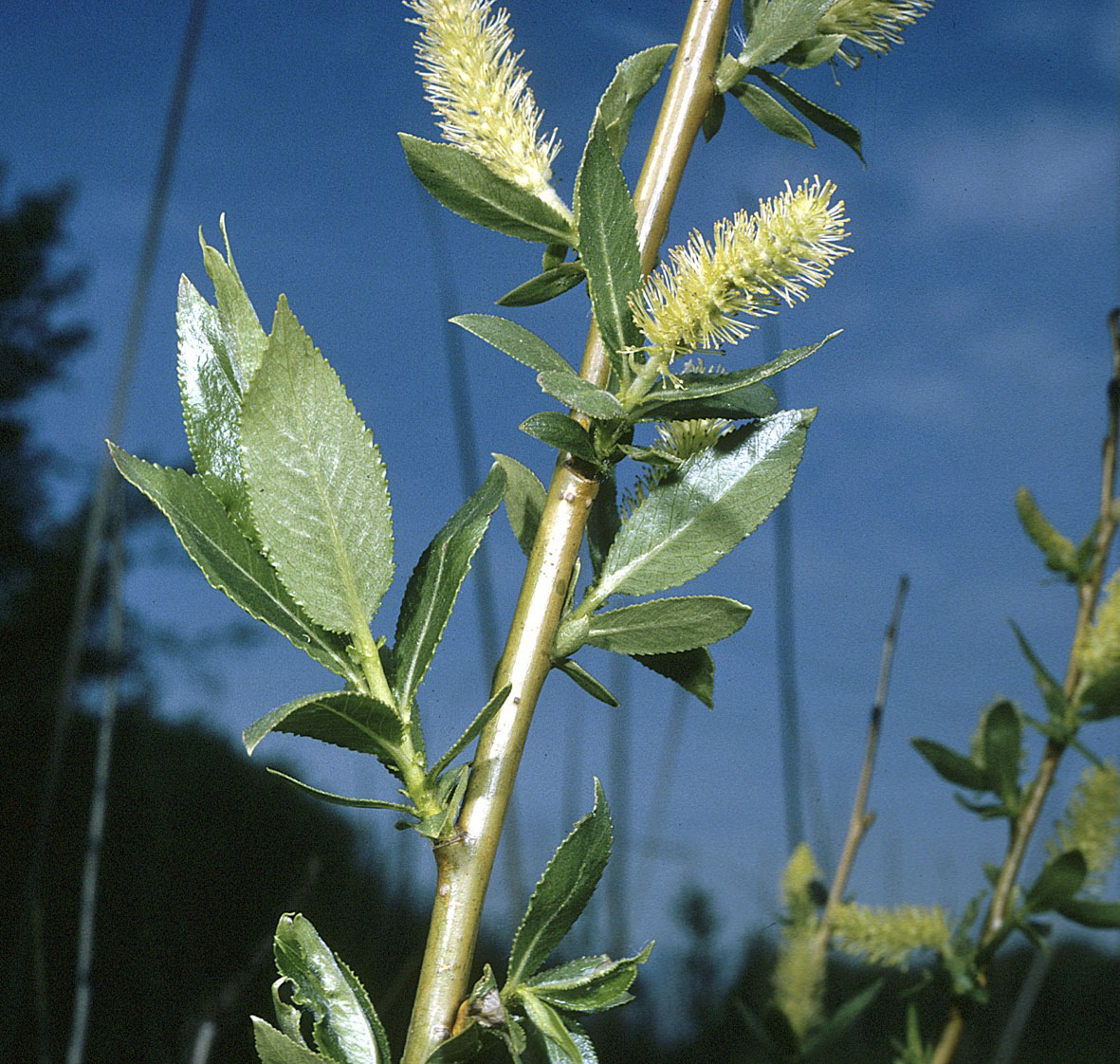
Pacific willow, Salix lasiandra

Family: Salicaceae

- Populus × acuminata, lanceleaf cottonwood,
- Populus alba, white poplar
- Populus angustifolia, narrowleaf cottonwood
- Populus balsamifera, black cottonwood
- Populus × brayshawii, hybrid balsam poplar
- Populus deltoides, eastern cottonwood
- Populus tremuloides, quaking aspen
- Salix alba, white willow
- Salix amygdaloides, peach-leaf willow
- Salix arctica, arctic willow
- Salix barclayi, Barclay's willow
- Salix barrattiana, Barratt's willow
- Salix bebbiana, Bebb's willow
- Salix boothii, Booth's willow
- Salix brachycarpa, short-fruit willow
- Salix candida, hoary willow
- Salix cascadensis, Cascade willow
- Salix commutata, undergreen willow
- Salix discolor, pussy willow
- Salix drummondiana, Drummond's willow
- Salix eastwoodiae, Eastwood's willow
- Salix eriocephala, diamond willow
- Salix eriocephala var. famelica, Missouri River willow
- Salix eriocephala var. mackenzieana, Mackenzie's willow
- Salix eriocephala var. watsonii, yellow willow
- Salix exigua, sandbar willow
- Salix farriae, Farr's willow
- Salix × fragilis, crack willow
- Salix geyeriana, Geyer's willow
- Salix glauca, gray willow
- Salix lasiandra, Pacific willow
- Salix lasiandra var. caudata, greenleaf willow
- Salix lasiandra var. lasiandra, Pacific willow
- Salix lemmonii, Lemmon's willow
- Salix melanopsis, dusky willow
- Salix pentandra, laurel willow
- Salix petiolaris, meadow willow
- Salix planifolia, tea-leaved willow
- Salix pseudomonticola, false mountain willow
- Salix reticulata, net-veined willow
- Salix rotundifolia, roundleaf willow
- Salix × rubens, hybrid crack willow
- Salix scouleriana, Scouler's willow
- Salix serissima, autumn willow
- Salix sitchensis, Sitka willow
- Salix tweedyi, Tweedy's willow
- Salix vestita, rock willow
- Salix wolfii, Wolf willow

== See also ==
- List of dicotyledons of Montana
