= Diamond willow =

Wood with naturally occurring diamond-shaped patterns

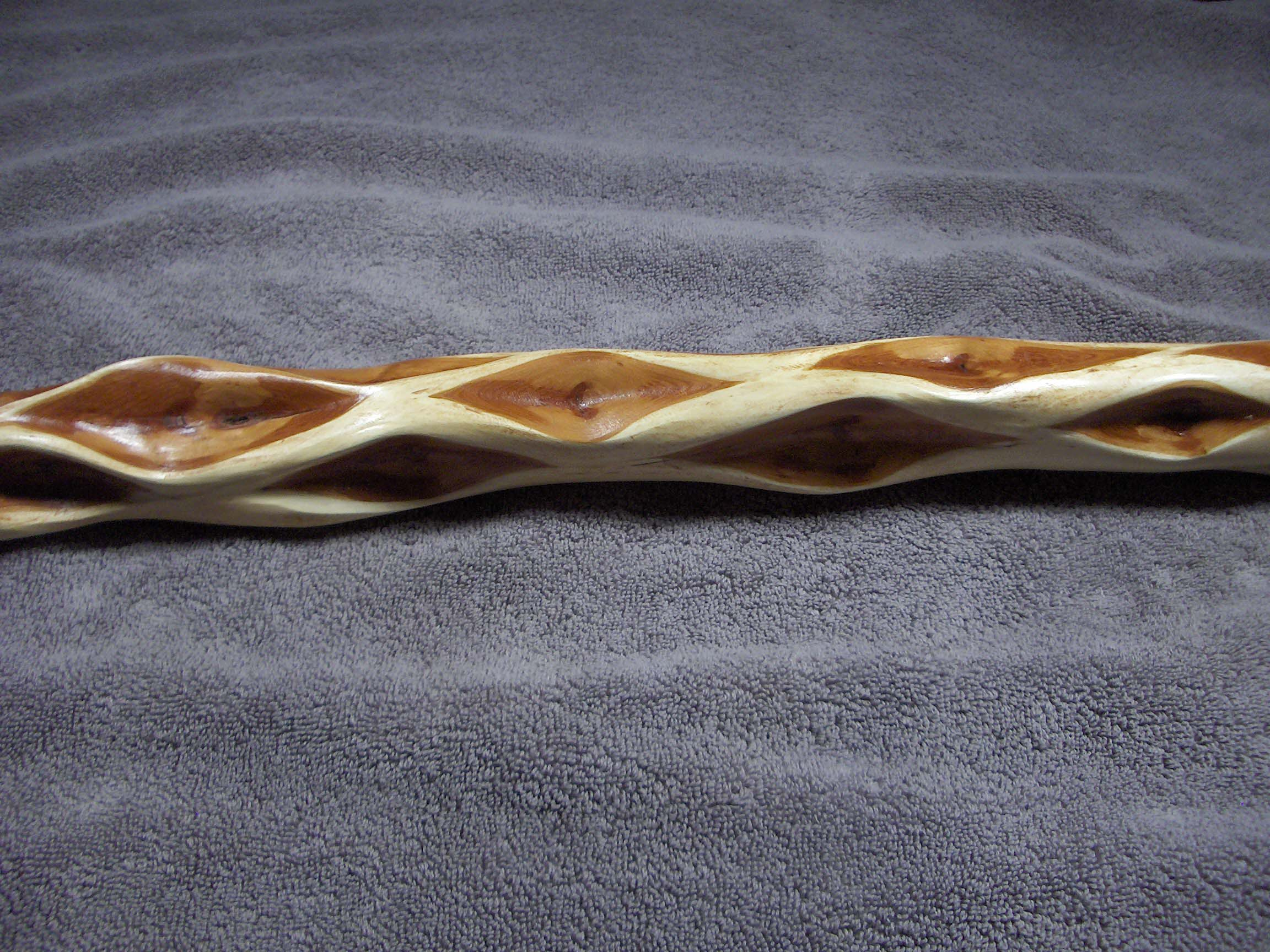
- A stick of diamond willow.
- Causal agents: Valsa sordida
- Hosts: willow trees
- EPPO Code: VALSSO

Diamond willow is a type of tree with wood which is transformed into diamond-shaped segments that have alternating colors. Salix bebbiana, the most common, is a species of willow indigenous to Canada and the northern United States, from Alaska and Yukon south to California and Arizona and northeast to Newfoundland and New England. Among common names are beaked willow, long-beaked willow, gray willow, and Bebb's willow. This species is also called red willow by Native Americans according to The Arctic Prairies Appendix E by Ernest Tompson Seton.

The diamond shapes can be caused by a fungus (Valsa sordida and possibly others). Diamond willow fungus is known to have medicinal properties and is used for both medical and ceremonial purposes by First Nations; it has been called a "sacred medicine."

Diamond willow is prized by wood carvers and furniture makers for its strong contrasting colors (red and white) and its sculptural irregularity of shape.

There are at least six different species that have been identified as being susceptible to diamonding, including Salix bebbiana (the most common) plus S. pseudomonticola, S. arbusculoides, S. discolor, S. scouleriana, and S. alaxensis.

The diamonding is usually found with a branch at its center or is found in the Y of a tree. Diamonding in willow does not seem to be specific to an area that willows grow in, and where one bunch of willow will have diamonds, the next clump of willows may have none at all. Although diamond willow is often thought of as being a northern phenomenon, of the boreal forest, there is mention of diamond willow growing as far south as Missouri.

== Diamond formation and shape ==
The tree grows diamond-shaped cankers in response to the fungus. If the branch is relatively small it seems to die very quickly. If the branch is larger, it may continue to grow and the diamond is formed on the branch and the stem. New layers of growth occur further and further away from the site of the fungus. If the tree has been affected in several places close together, then the diamonds run into each other, resulting in pronounced ridges if some sapwood continues to survive.

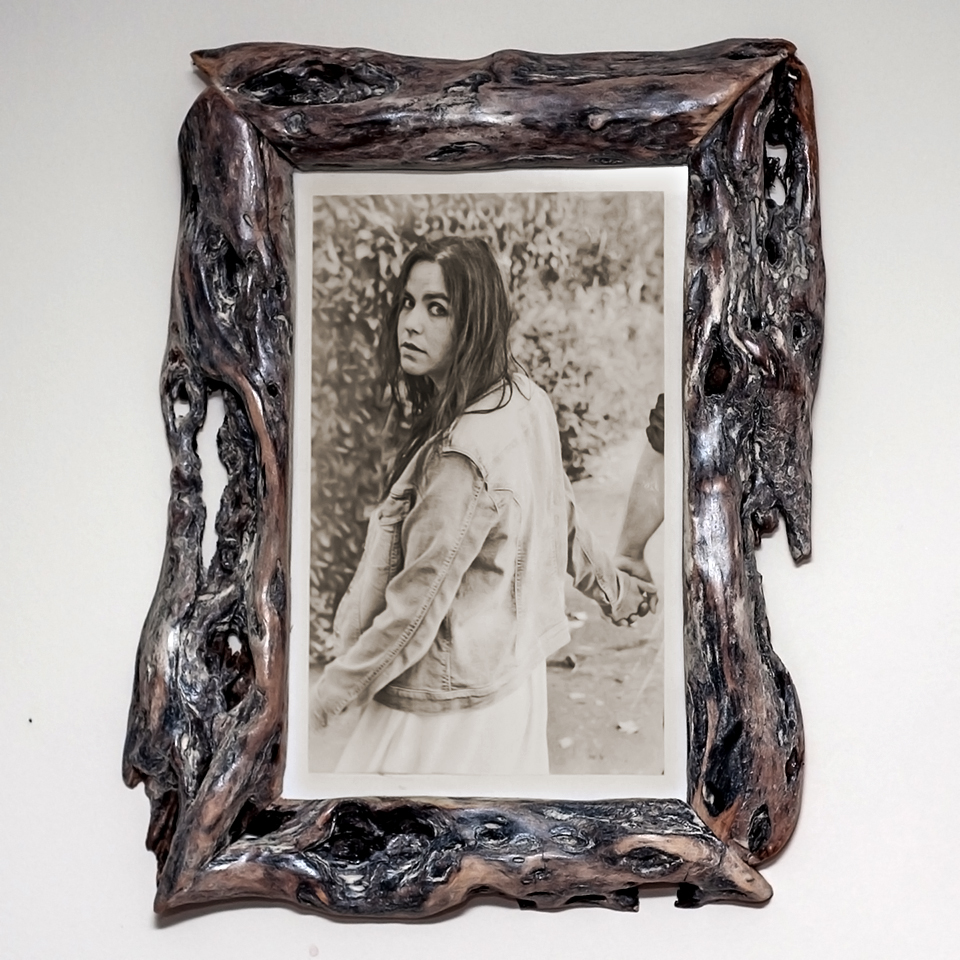
Diamond willow picture frame made in Calgary, Alberta, Canada - Craig's Unique Frames

The shape of the diamonds seems to vary from one clump of willow to the next, although there may be some general tendencies within a single species. Some stems will form long narrow diamonds; others will be short and wide. All the diamonds on the stems in one clump will usually have similar growth patterns. If the new layers of sapwood do not move back very much each year, then the diamonds will be deep bowl or cleft-shaped. These stems will be able to survive longer than the ones with flat diamonds. The bark that is left over the top of the diamond changes quite markedly from the bark over the living sapwood. Depending on the species of willow, the living bark is usually smoother and slightly lighter in color. The bark over the diamond typically becomes rougher and somewhat darker. It also becomes tougher and adheres much more to the underlying wood. The sapwood is white to cream in color depending on the species and the location. The heartwood is reddish-brown. This color tends to darken with exposure to light over a number of years.

If one stem in a clump of willow is affected, then all of them are likely to be. However, the neighboring clump may be complete without diamonds. Quaking Aspen (Populus tremuloides) has been known to bear depressions that resemble diamonding.
