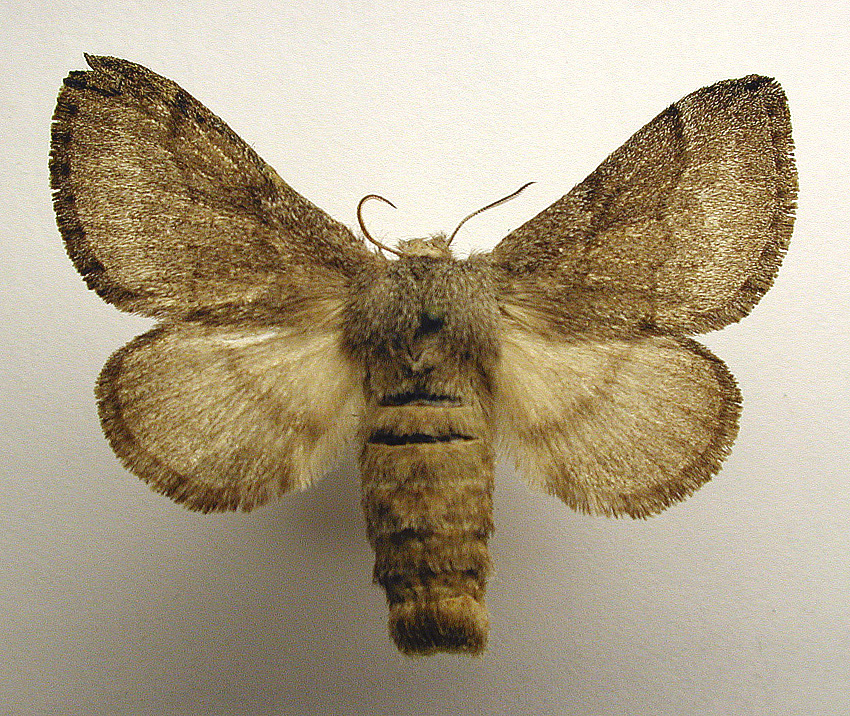
- Female
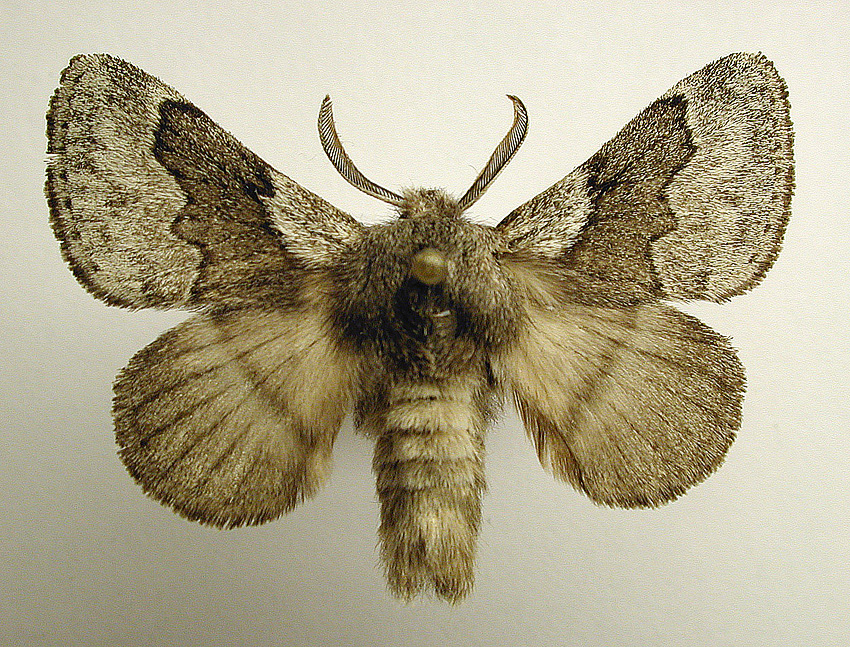
- Male

Scientific classification
- Kingdom: Animalia
- Phylum: Arthropoda
- Class: Insecta
- Order: Lepidoptera
- Family: Lasiocampidae
- Genus: Trichiura
- Species: T. crataegi

Binomial name
- Trichiura crataegi (Linnaeus, 1758)

Synonyms
- Phalaena crataegi Linnaeus, 1758; Trichiura vallisincola Daniel, 1956; Trichiura griseotincta Daniel, 1956; Trichiura albicans Daniel, 1956; Bombyx ariae Hubner, 1824

= Trichiura crataegi =

Species of moth

Trichiura crataegi, the pale eggar or pale oak eggar, is a moth of the family Lasiocampidae. It was first described by Carl Linnaeus in his 1758 10th edition of Systema Naturae. It is found in all of Europe (except Iceland), east to Anatolia and east across the Palearctic to Amur.

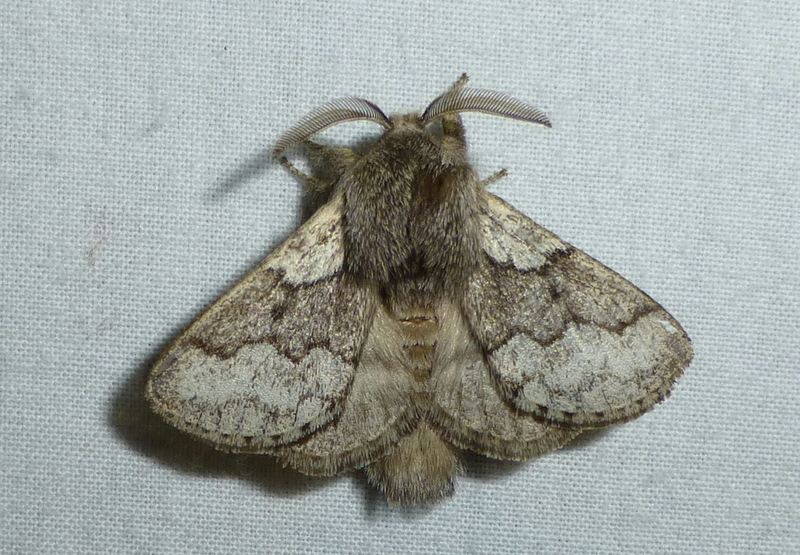

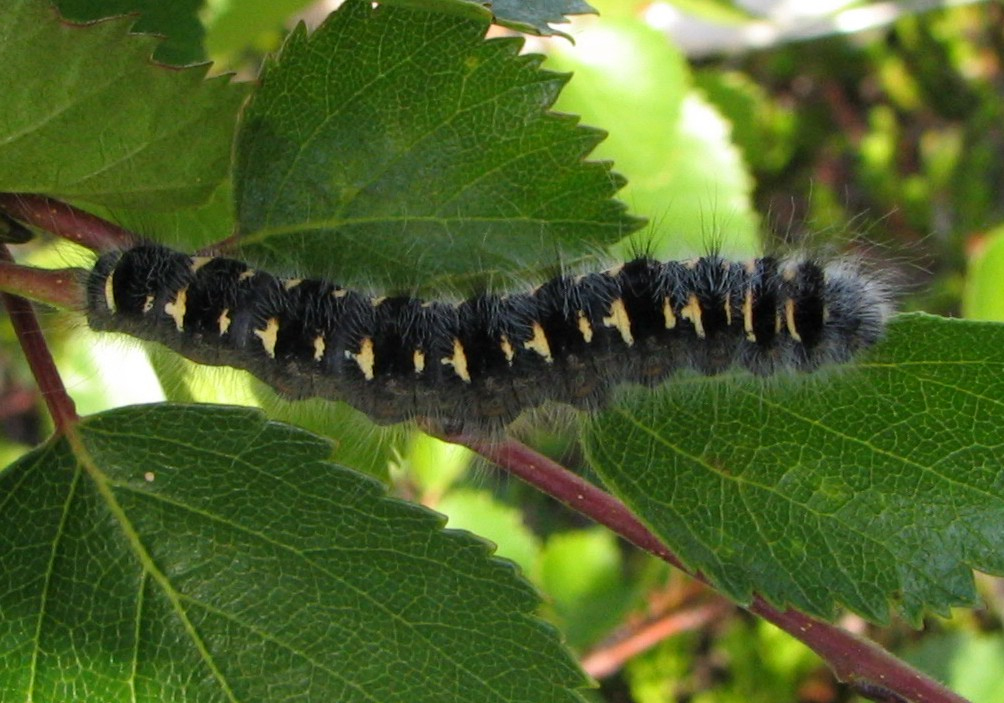
Larva

The wingspan is 25–30 mm. The forewings are grey or dark grey, whitish-sprinkled. The lines are white, internally blackish-edged, the first curved, the second twice sinuate. The subterminal line is indicated by an irregular whitish suffusion. The hindwings are light grey, darker posteriorly with a cloudy pale or whitish median line, anteriorly edged with dark grey. The larva is black, grey, or whitish marked with black, hairs reddish-brown. In pale specimens there is an irregular dark dorsal band; subdorsal series of brown-red spots, sometimes separated by whitish ochreous spots.

Adults are on wing from August to September.

The larvae feed on various plants and trees, including Betula verrucosa, Betula pubescens, Betula nana, Alnus incana, Salix species (including Salix lapponum, Salix hastata, Salix repens, Salix starkeana, Salix caprea and Salix phylicifolia), Populus tremula, Sorbus aucuparia, Crataegus species, Prunus padus, Vaccinium myrtillus and Vaccinium uliginosum.

== Subspecies ==
- Trichiura crataegi crataegi
- ?Trichiura crataegi borealis (northern Fennoscandia)
- Trichiura crataegi lasistana (mountains of north-eastern Anatolia)
- ?Trichiura crataegi anatolica (Anatolia)
