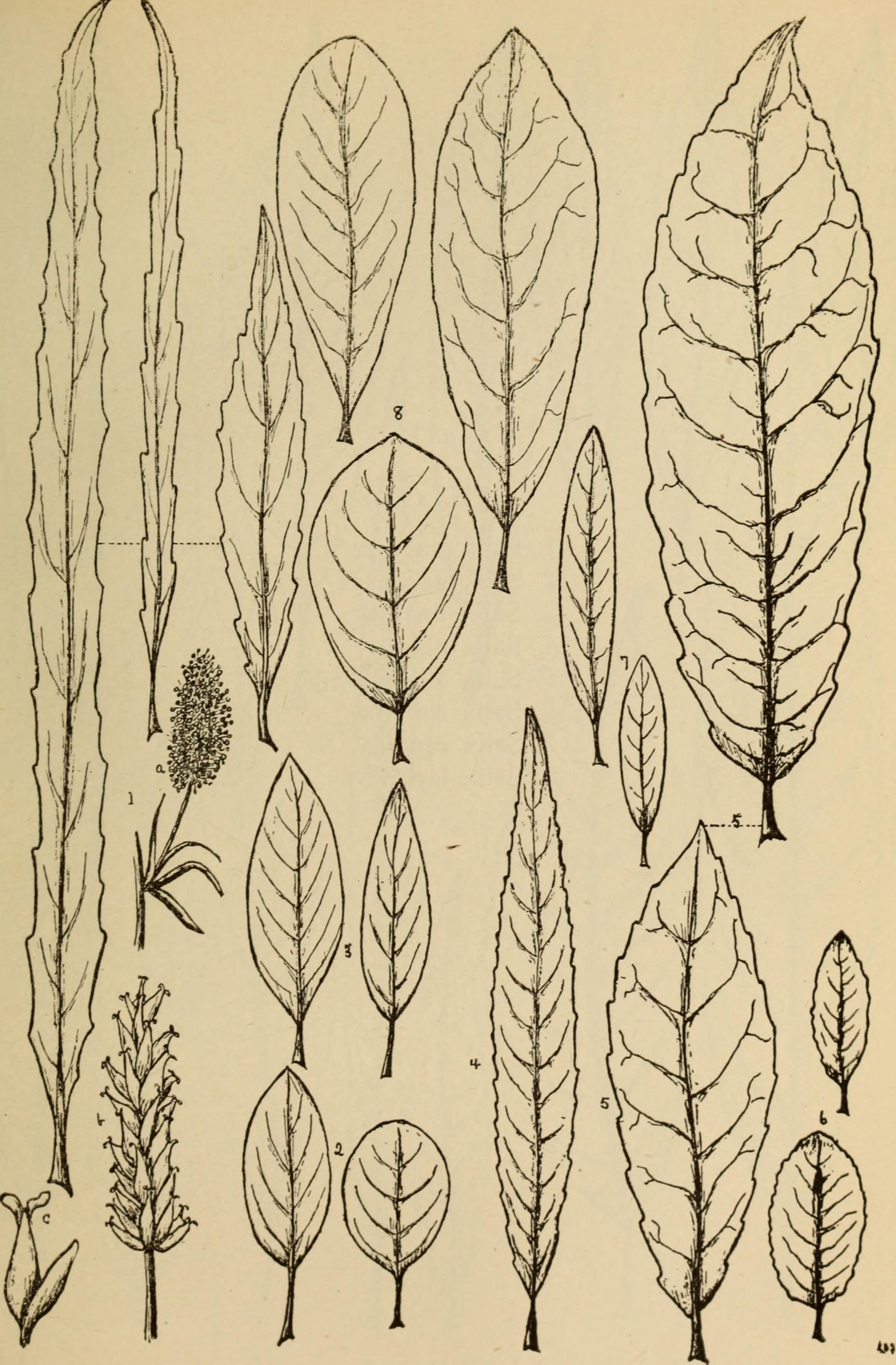
- Salix irrorata leaf
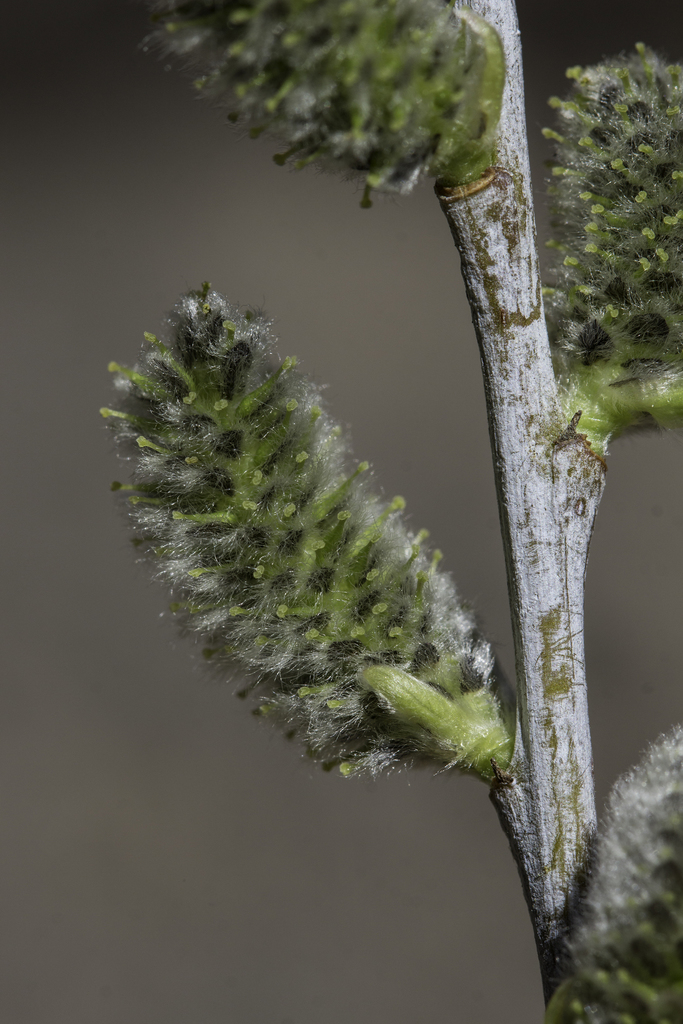

Conservation status
- Least Concern (IUCN 3.1)

Scientific classification
- Kingdom: Plantae
- Clade: Embryophytes
- Clade: Tracheophytes
- Clade: Spermatophytes
- Clade: Angiosperms
- Clade: Eudicots
- Clade: Rosids
- Order: Malpighiales
- Family: Salicaceae
- Genus: Salix
- Species: S. irrorata

Binomial name
- Salix irrorata Andersson

= Salix irrorata =

Species of flowering plant

Salix irrorata, the dewystem willow, blue-stem willow, or sandbar willow, is a species of willow native to the US states of Wyoming, Colorado, Arizona, and New Mexico, and to northern Mexico. In spite of its bluestem willow common name, its stems are red, but a white coat develops that makes them appear bluish. A bushy shrub that prefers moist areas, in a garden setting it needs coppicing to both keep it from growing overlarge and to maintain the attractive bark coloration. It has gained the Royal Horticultural Society's Award of Garden Merit as an ornamental.
