= Valsa sordida =

Scientific classification
- Kingdom: Fungi
- Division: Ascomycota
- Class: Sordariomycetes
- Order: Diaporthales
- Family: Valsaceae
- Genus: Valsa
- Species: V. sordida

Binomial name
- Valsa sordida Nitschke (1870)

Synonyms
- Engizostoma sordidum (Nitschke) Kuntze (1898)

Species of fungus

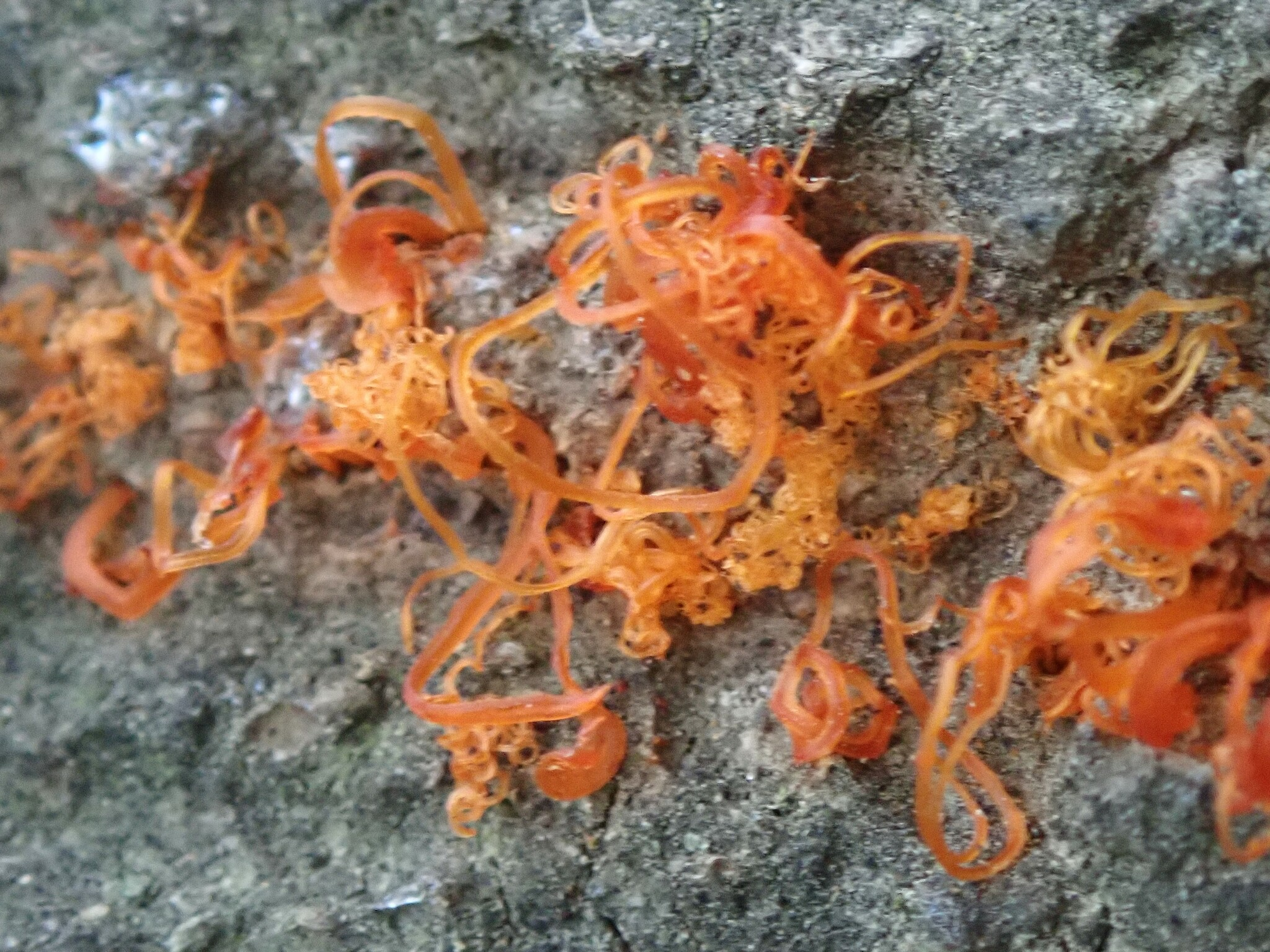
Cytospora chrysosperma, anamorph

Valsa sordida is a species of fungus within the family Valsaceae. A plant pathogen, it causes dieback of small branches and twigs of broad-leaved trees, usually poplar. It is found in Africa, Australasia, Europe, and North and South America. The anamorph is Cytospora chrysosperma.
