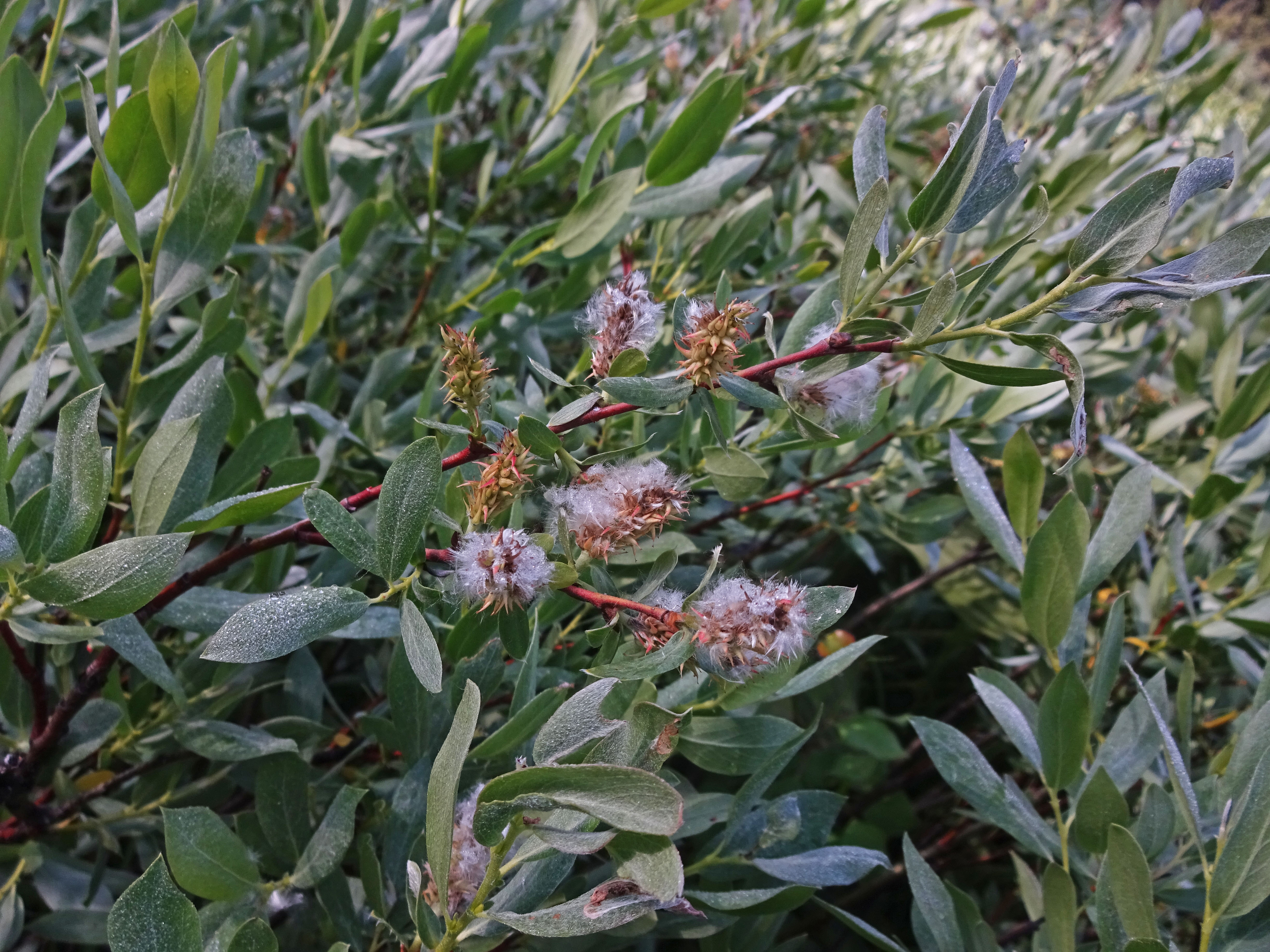

Scientific classification
- Kingdom: Plantae
- Clade: Tracheophytes
- Clade: Angiosperms
- Clade: Eudicots
- Clade: Rosids
- Order: Malpighiales
- Family: Salicaceae
- Genus: Salix
- Species: S. wolfii

Binomial name
- Salix wolfii Bebb, 1879

= Salix wolfii =

Species of willow

Salix wolfi, or Wolf's willow, is a species of willow native to western United States, from north-central Montana and central Oregon to northern New Mexico.

== Description ==
It is a small, low-growing willow that grows about 40-100 cm (1-3 ft) tall. The leaves are about 1-5 cm long with either lanceolate or elliptic shape with long hairs on either side of the leaves. Twigs are pubescent with wavy hairs.

== Distribution ==
It is native to Oregon, Idaho, Montana, Wyoming, Nevada, Utah, Colorado and New Mexico.

== Habitat ==
Subalpine meadows, streams and ponds.
