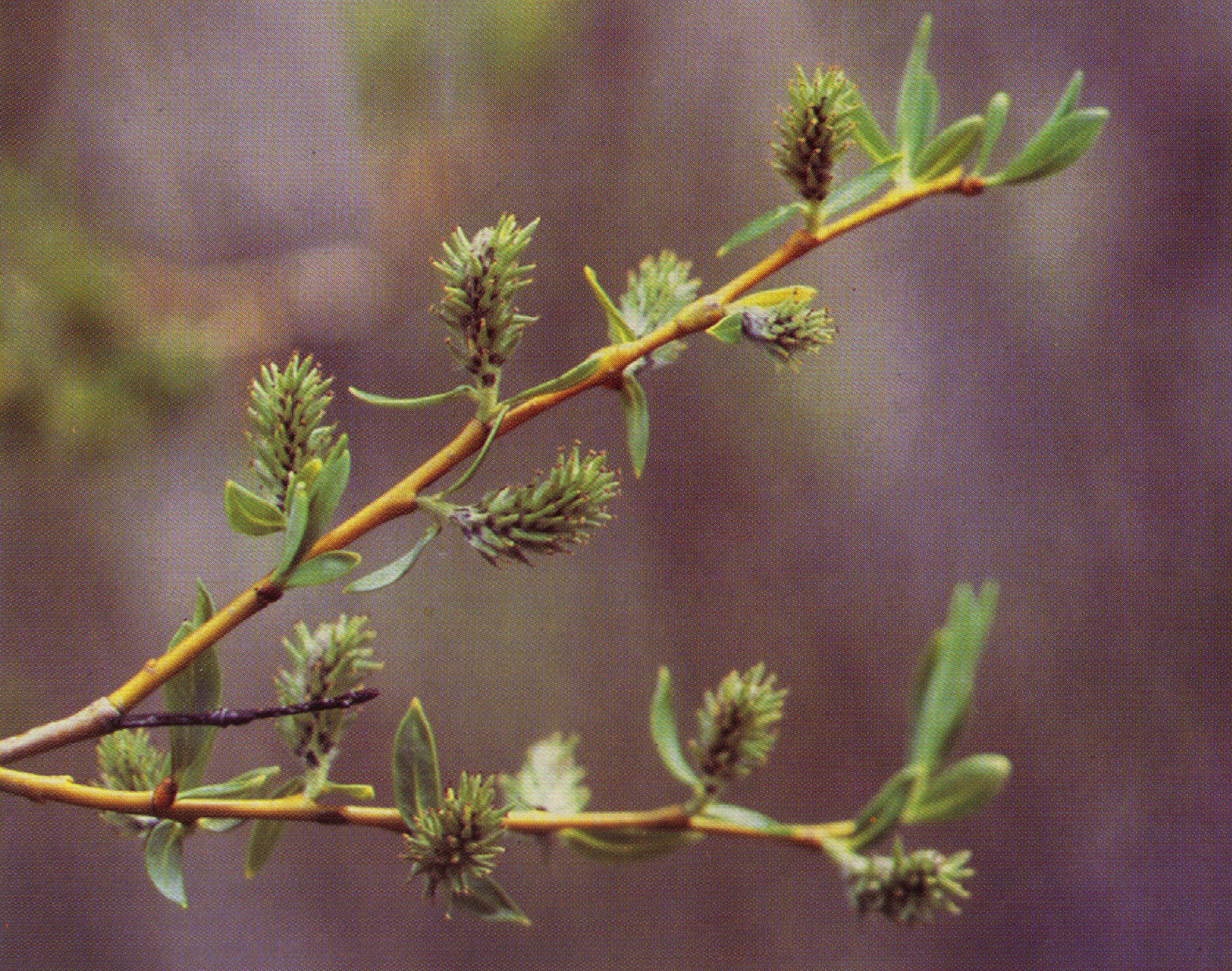

Scientific classification
- Kingdom: Plantae
- Clade: Tracheophytes
- Clade: Angiosperms
- Clade: Eudicots
- Clade: Rosids
- Order: Malpighiales
- Family: Salicaceae
- Genus: Salix
- Species: S. lemmonii

Binomial name
- Salix lemmonii Bebb

= Salix lemmonii =

Species of willow

Salix lemmonii is a species of willow known by the common name Lemmon's willow, named after J.G. Lemmon. It is native to western North America from British Columbia to California to Colorado, where it grows in moist and wet areas in mountain coniferous forest habitat, such as streambanks and meadows.

== Description ==
Salix lemmonii is a shrub growing 1 to 4 meters tall, sometimes forming colonial thickets. Its stems arise in a cluster and spread into many slender, angular branches. The leaves are up to 11 centimeters long, lance-shaped to oval with pointed tips, smooth or lightly serrated along the edges, and hairless and waxy or slightly hairy. The inflorescence is a stout catkin of flowers a few centimeters long, the female catkins lengthening to 6 or 7 centimeters as the fruits develop. This willow sometimes hybridizes with Salix geyeriana, to which it is closely related.

This shrub is commonly used in revegetation projects in its native range, where it is useful for stabilizing eroded riparian habitat.
