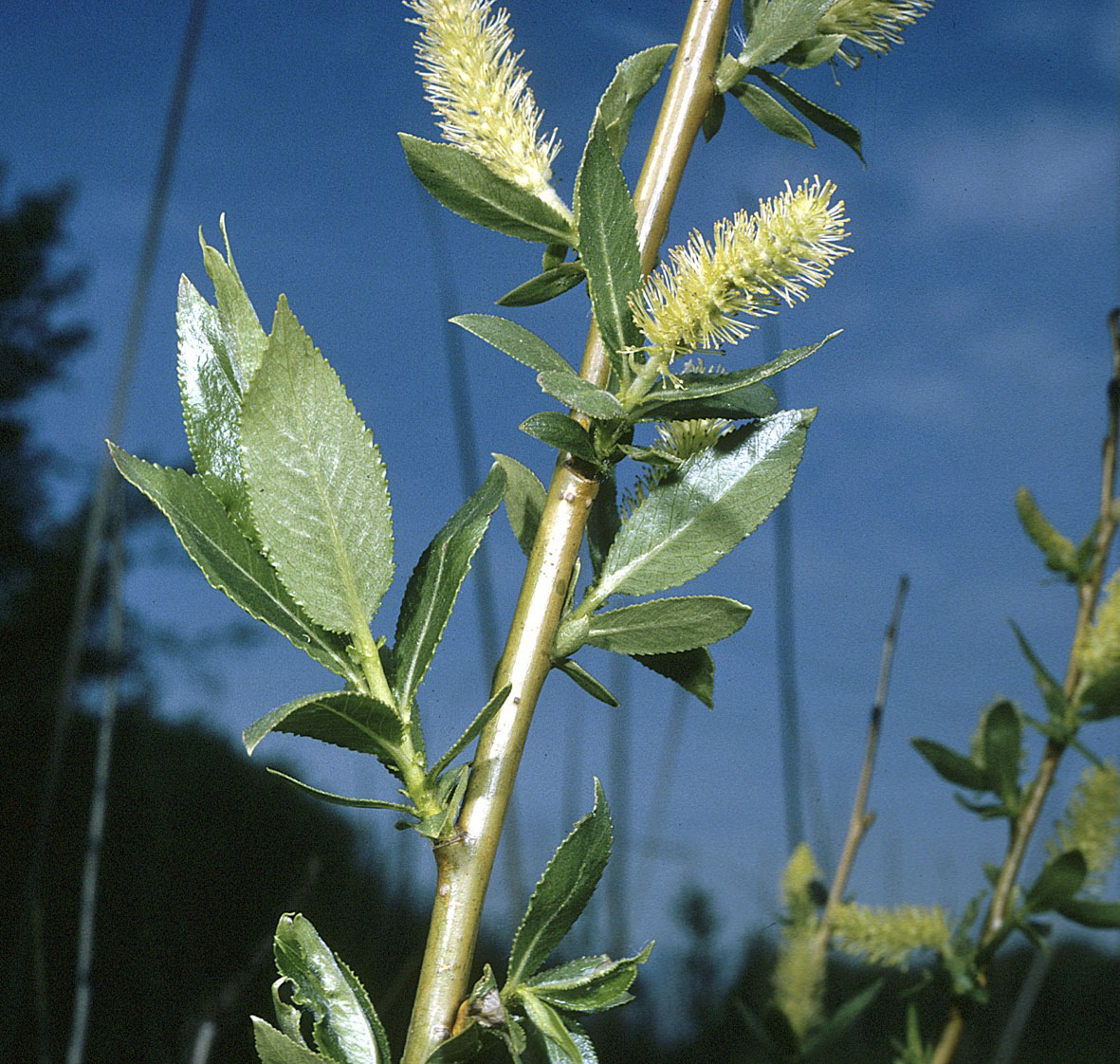
- Salix lucida lucida

Conservation status
- Least Concern (IUCN 3.1)

Scientific classification
- Kingdom: Plantae
- Clade: Tracheophytes
- Clade: Angiosperms
- Clade: Eudicots
- Clade: Rosids
- Order: Malpighiales
- Family: Salicaceae
- Genus: Salix
- Species: S. lucida

Binomial name
- Salix lucida Muhl.
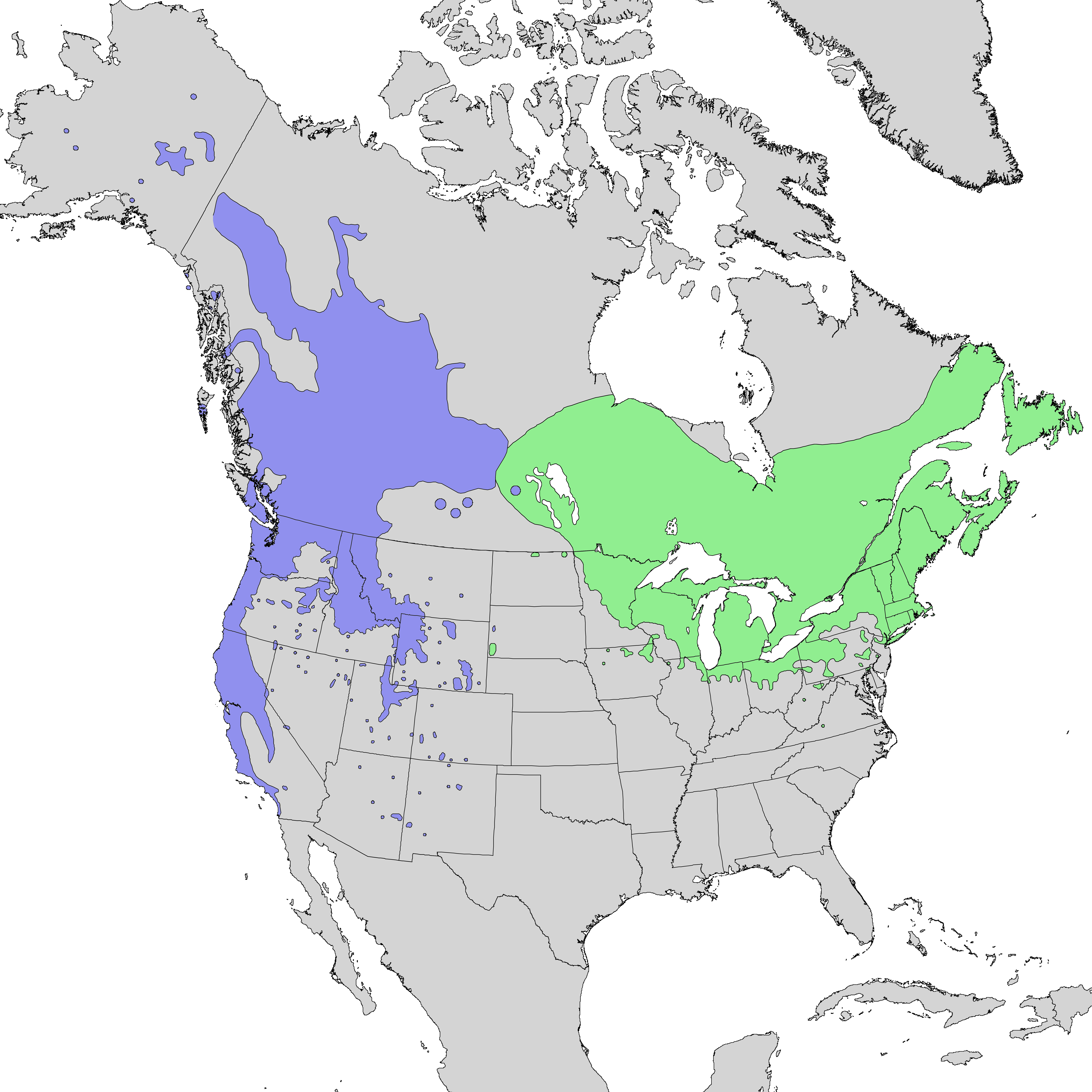
- Natural range of Salix lucida subsp. lucida (green) subsp. lasiandra (blue)

= Salix lucida =

Species of plant

Salix lucida, the shining willow, Pacific willow, red willow, or whiplash willow, is a species of willow native to northern and western North America, occurring in wetland habitats. It is the largest willow found in British Columbia.

It is a deciduous large shrub or small tree growing to 4–15 metres (13–49 ft) tall. The shoots are greenish-brown to grey-brown. The leaves are narrow elliptic to lanceolate, 4–17 centimetres (1 1/2–6 1/2 in) long and 1–3.5 cm (1/2–1 1/2 in) broad, glossy dark green above, usually glaucous green below, hairless or thinly hairy. The flowers are yellow catkins 1–9 cm (1/2–3 1/2 in) long, produced in late spring after the leaves emerge.

The subspecies are:

- S. l. lucida – shining willow, Newfoundland west to eastern Saskatchewan, and south to Maryland and South Dakota
- S. l. lasiandra (Benth.) E.Murray (syn. S. lasiandra Benth.) – Pacific willow, Alaska east to Northwest Territory, and south to California and New Mexico.
- S. l. caudata (Nutt.) E.Murray – whiplash willow, interior western North America from eastern British Columbia south to eastern California and Nevada, included in S. l. lasiandra by some authors.

It is closely related to Salix pentandra of Europe and Asia.

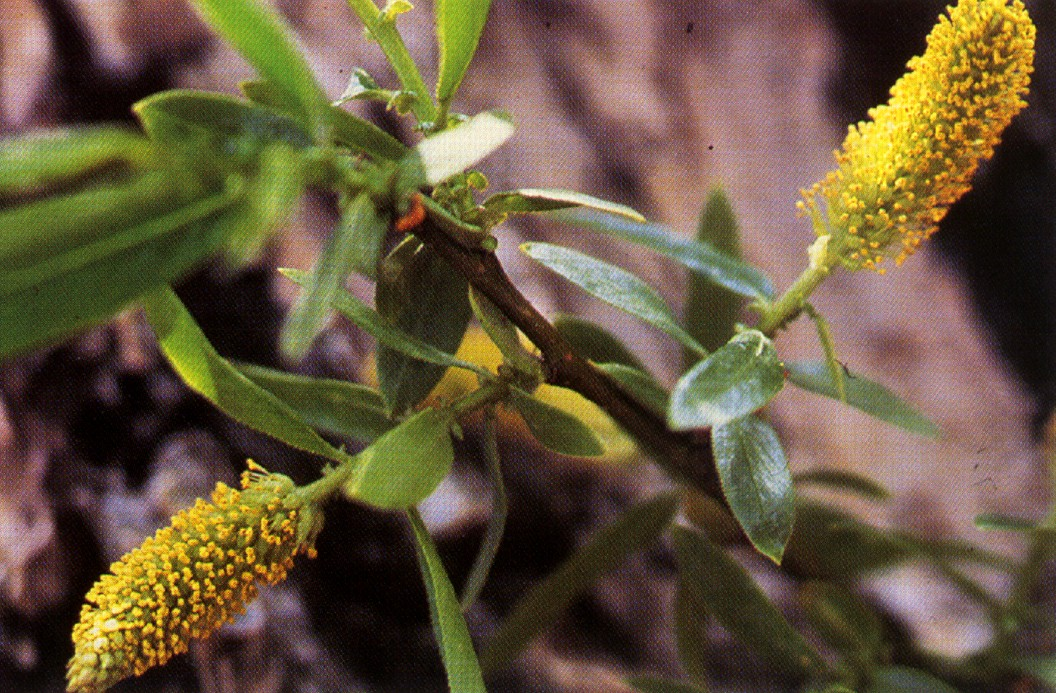
Male catkins of S. l. lasiandra
