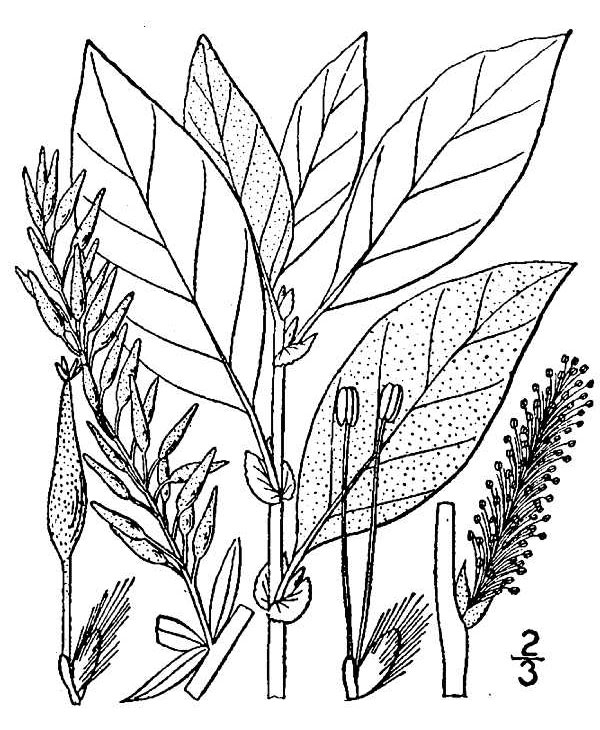

Conservation status
- Least Concern (IUCN 3.1)

Scientific classification
- Kingdom: Plantae
- Clade: Tracheophytes
- Clade: Angiosperms
- Clade: Eudicots
- Clade: Rosids
- Order: Malpighiales
- Family: Salicaceae
- Genus: Salix
- Species: S. bebbiana

Binomial name
- Salix bebbiana Sarg.
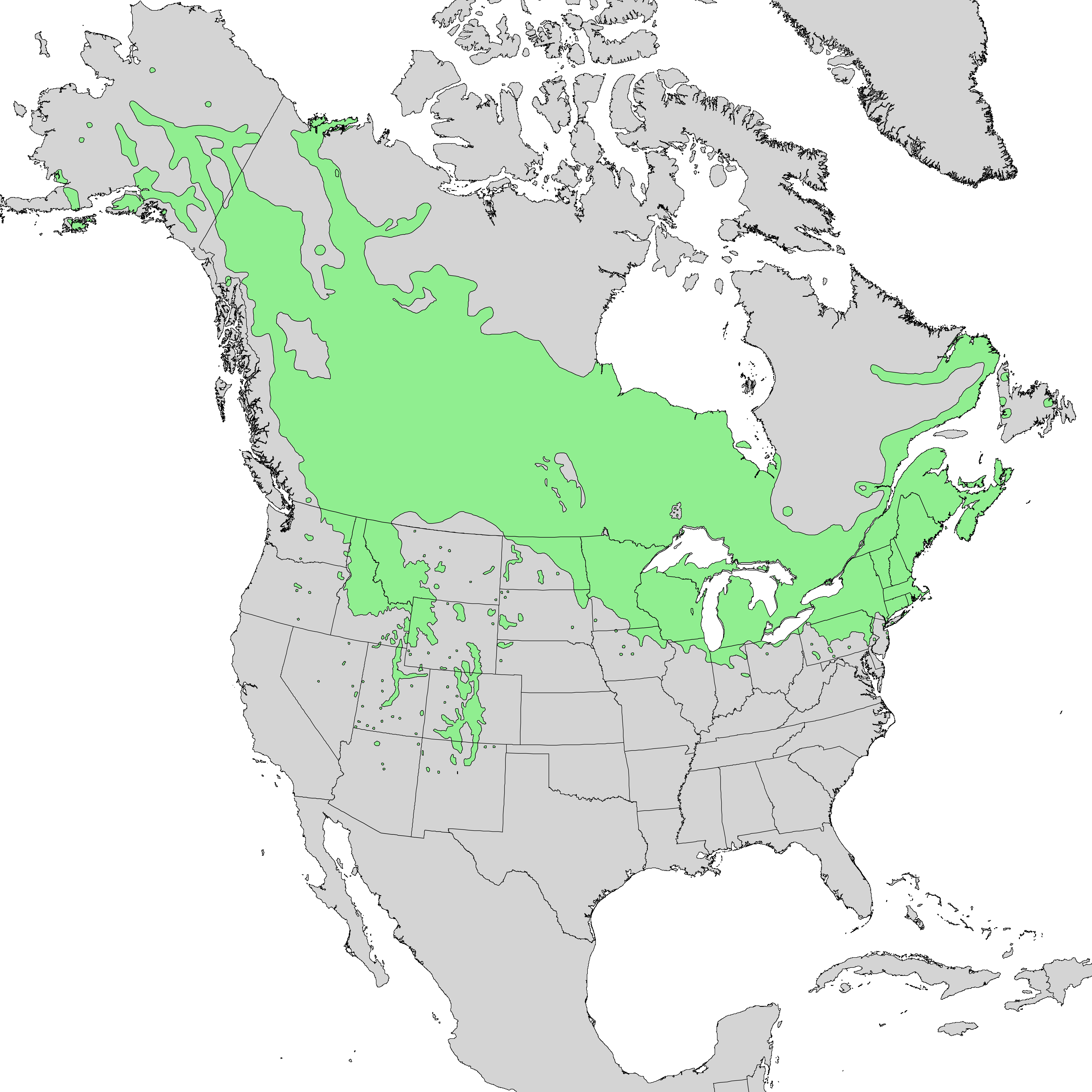
- Natural range of Salix bebbiana

Synonyms
- List: Salix bebbiana var. capreifolia (Fernald) Fernald; Salix bebbiana f. capreifolia (Fernald) C.K.Schneid.; Salix bebbiana var. depilis Raup; Salix bebbiana f. luxurians (Fernald) C.K.Schneid.; Salix bebbiana var. luxurians (Fernald) Fernald; Salix bebbiana var. perrostrata (Rydb.) C.K.Schneid.; Salix bebbiana var. projecta (Fernald) C.K.Schneid.; Salix cinerascens (Wahlenb.) Flod.; Salix depressa Fr.; Salix depressa var. cinerascens (Wahlenb.) Fr.; Salix depressa f. cinerascens (Wahlenb.) Regel; Salix depressa subsp. rostrata (Andersson) Hiitonen; Salix floderi (Wahlenb.) Nakai; Salix floderusii var. fuscescens Nakai; Salix floderusii f. manshurica (Siuzew) Nakai; Salix geminata Y.L.Chang & Skvortsov; Salix hsinganica Y.L.Chang & Skvortsov; Salix ilectica Y.L.Chou; Salix ilectica var. integristyla Y.L.Chou; Salix livida var. cinerascens Wahlenb.; Salix livida var. occidentalis A.Gray; Salix livida var. rostrata (Andersson) Dippel; Salix macropoda Stschegl.; Salix orotchonorum Kimura; Salix perrostrata Rydb.; Salix rostrata Richardson; Salix rostrata var. capreifolia Fernald; Salix rostrata var. luxurians Fernald; Salix rostrata var. perrostrata (Rydb.) Fernald; Salix rostrata var. projecta Fernald; Salix sphacelata Sommerf. ex Rchb.; Salix starkeana subsp. bebbiana (Sarg.) Youngberg; Salix starkeana var. cinerascens (Wahlenb.) C.K.Schneid.; Salix starkeana subsp. cinerascens (Wahlenb.) Hultén; Salix vagans subsp. cinerascens (Wahlenb.) Andersson; Salix vagans subsp. glabrescens Andersson; Salix vagans var. intermedia Andersson; Salix vagans intermedia Andersson; Salix vagans var. linnaeana Andersson; Salix vagans linneana Andersson; Salix vagans f. manshurica Siuzew; Salix vagans occidentalis Andersson; Salix vagans rostrata Andersson; Salix xerophila Flod.; Salix xerophila var. fuscescens (Nakai) W.Lee; Salix xerophila var. ilectica (Y.L.Chou) Y.L.Chou; Salix xerophila f. manshurica (Siuzew) Kitag.

= Salix bebbiana =

Species of willow

Salix bebbiana is a species of willow indigenous to Canada and the northern United States, from Alaska and Yukon south to California and Arizona and northeast to Newfoundland and New England. Common names include beak willow, beaked willow, long-beaked willow, gray willow, and Bebb's willow.

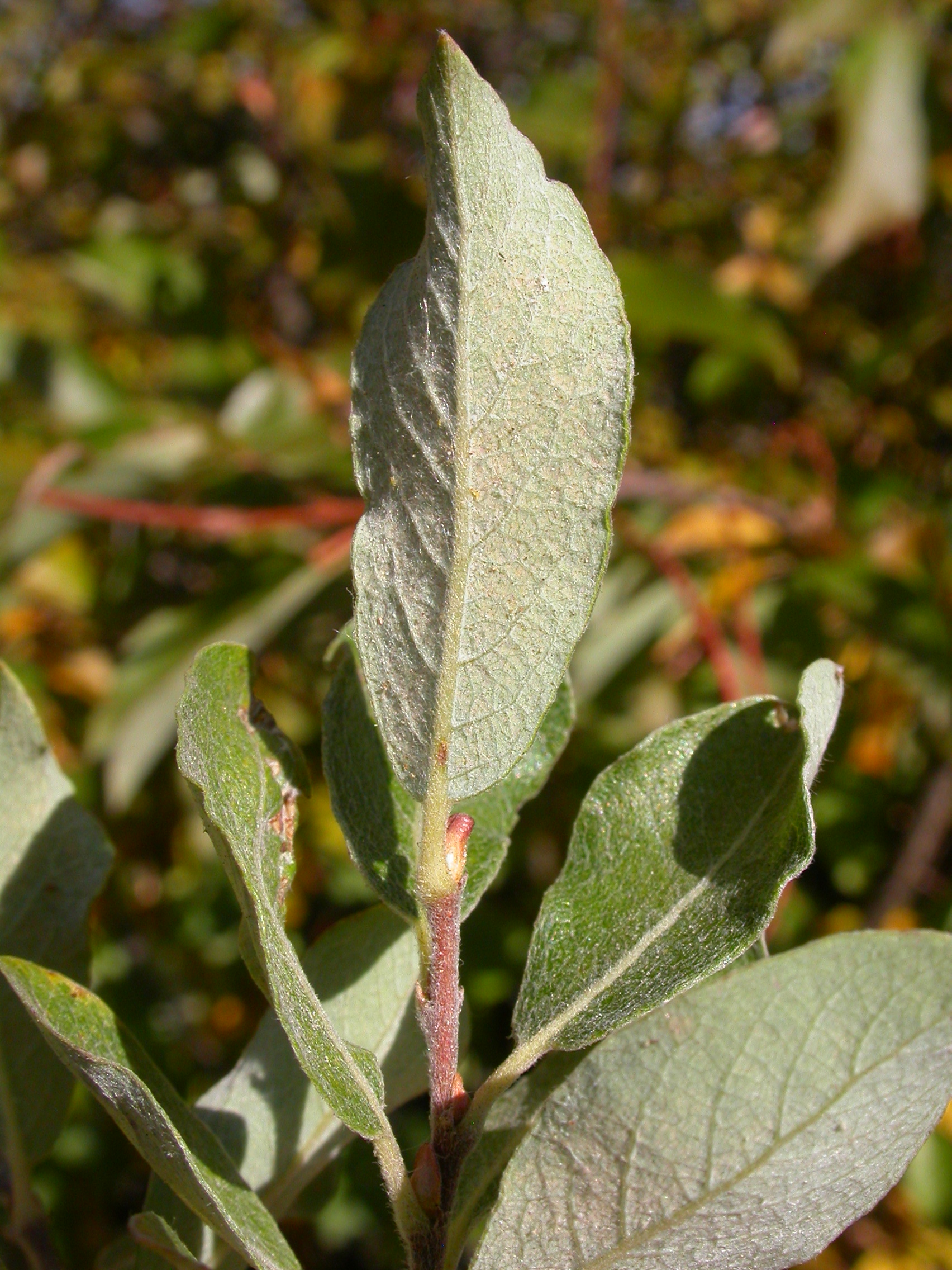
Leaf underside

It was originally dubbed "Salix rostrata", being firstly described by Sir John Richardson in the early 19th century. Many years later, the official taxonomy was changed, because Jean-Louis Thuillier had already employed "rostrata" for another Eurasian willow variety. As a tribute to the American botanist Michael Schuck Bebb, C.S. Sargent named it Salix bebbiana in his honor.

This plant is typically a large, fast-growing, multiple-stemmed shrub or small, shrubby tree capable of forming dense, colonial thickets. It can be found in loose, saturated soils such as that on riverbanks, lake sides, swamps, marshes, and bogs. It is capable of tolerating heavy clay and rocky soils, making it highly adaptable and durable. It is a dominant species in many marshland areas in its native range. It is a large shrub or small bushy tree from 5 to 20 feet in height with a trunk up to about 8 inches in diameter. The trunk is short and twisted with a broadly rounded crown.

Leaves are alternately arranged, simple, and ovate in shape, widest near the midrib and narrowing to a tapering base and pointed tip. The leaf edges are generally entire, though sometimes finely serrated. The leaves are dull blue-green in color and smooth in texture when mature; new leaves are coated in downy hairs. The leaves are up to 5 in long and 1.5 in wide. Like other willows, this plant is dioecious, with male and female plants producing small, dangling catkins. Female flowers yield spherical seeds covered in long, threadlike fibers that help them disperse on the wind. The plant also spreads via vegetative reproduction, sprouting from the base of the stem or from segments of root, and by layering, allowing the plant to form colonies of clones.

This is the most important species of diamond willow, a type of willow which produces fine, colorful wood used for carving. The twigs and branches are used by Native Americans for basket weaving and arrowmaking. Important host plant to 312 species of butterflies and moths

Many parts of the plant are consumed by animals, especially cattle, which find the foliage a palatable forage.

This species readily hybridizes with several other species of willow.

There seems to be no commercial importance for the plant.
