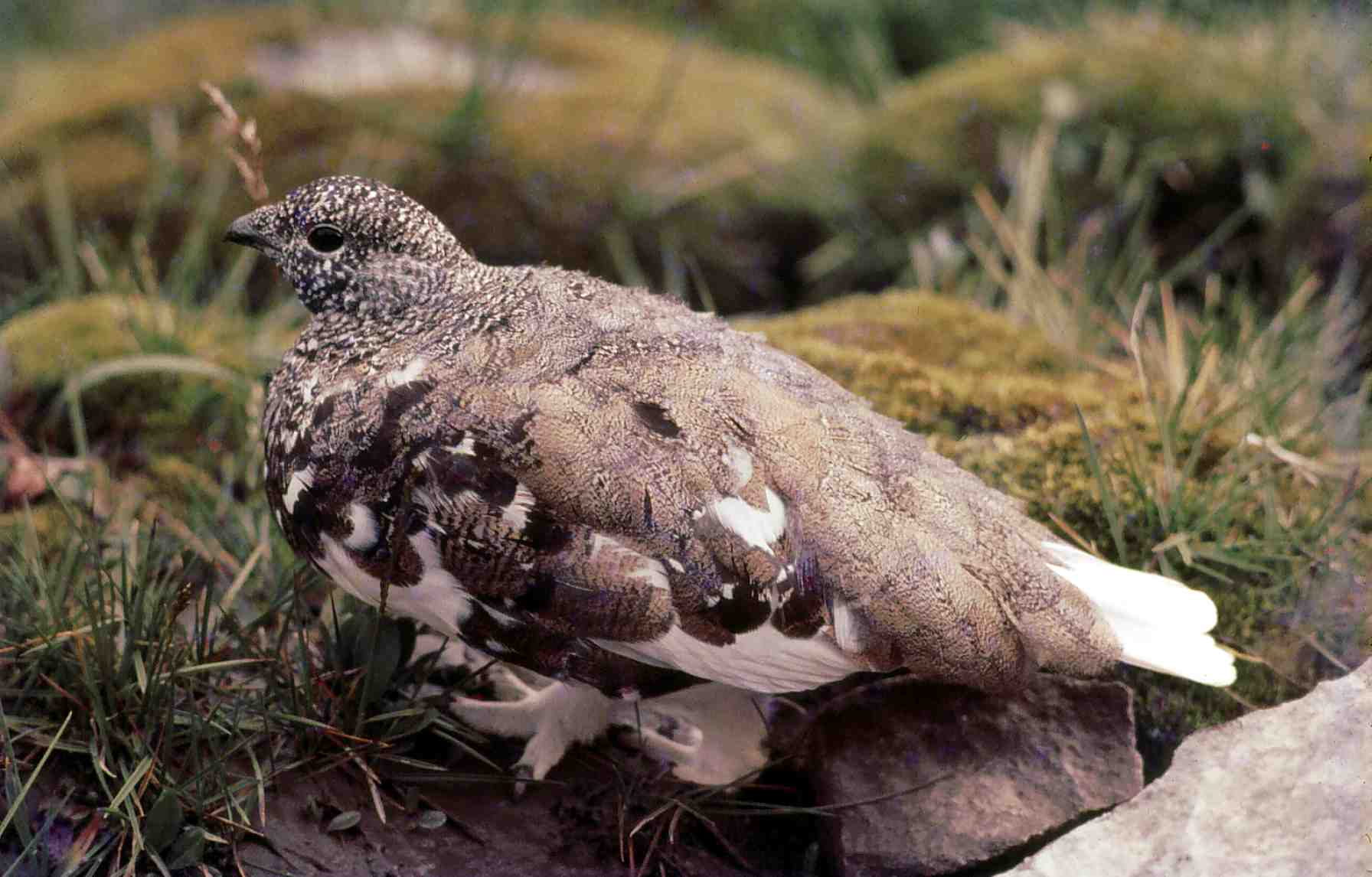

Conservation status
- Least Concern (IUCN 3.1)

Scientific classification
- Kingdom: Animalia
- Phylum: Chordata
- Class: Aves
- Order: Galliformes
- Family: Phasianidae
- Genus: Lagopus
- Species: L. leucura

Binomial name
- Lagopus leucura (Richardson, 1831)
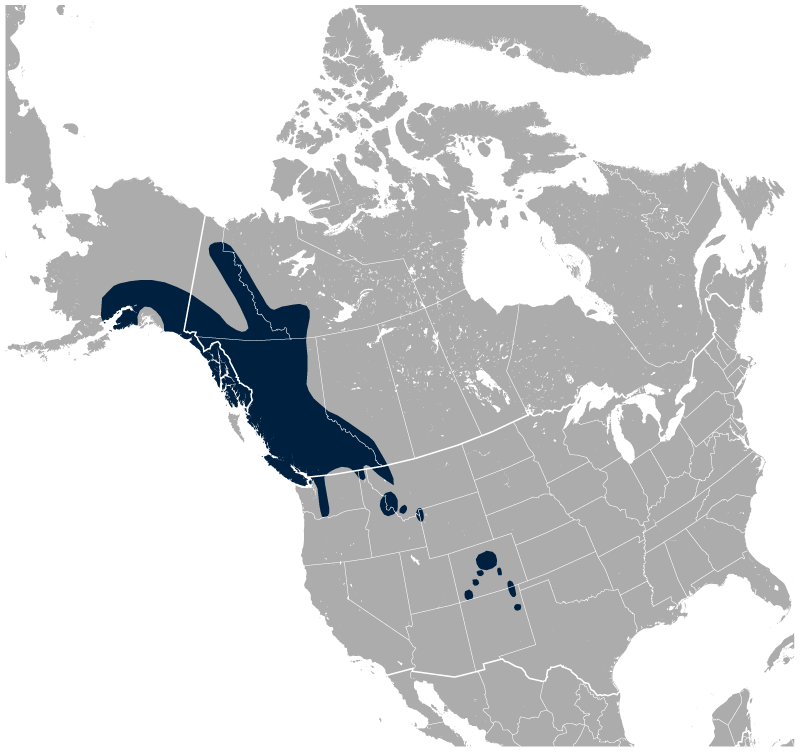
- White-tailed ptarmigan range

Synonyms
- Tetrao (Lagopus) leucurus Richardson, 1831; Lagopus leucurus (lapsus, see below)

= White-tailed ptarmigan =

Species of bird

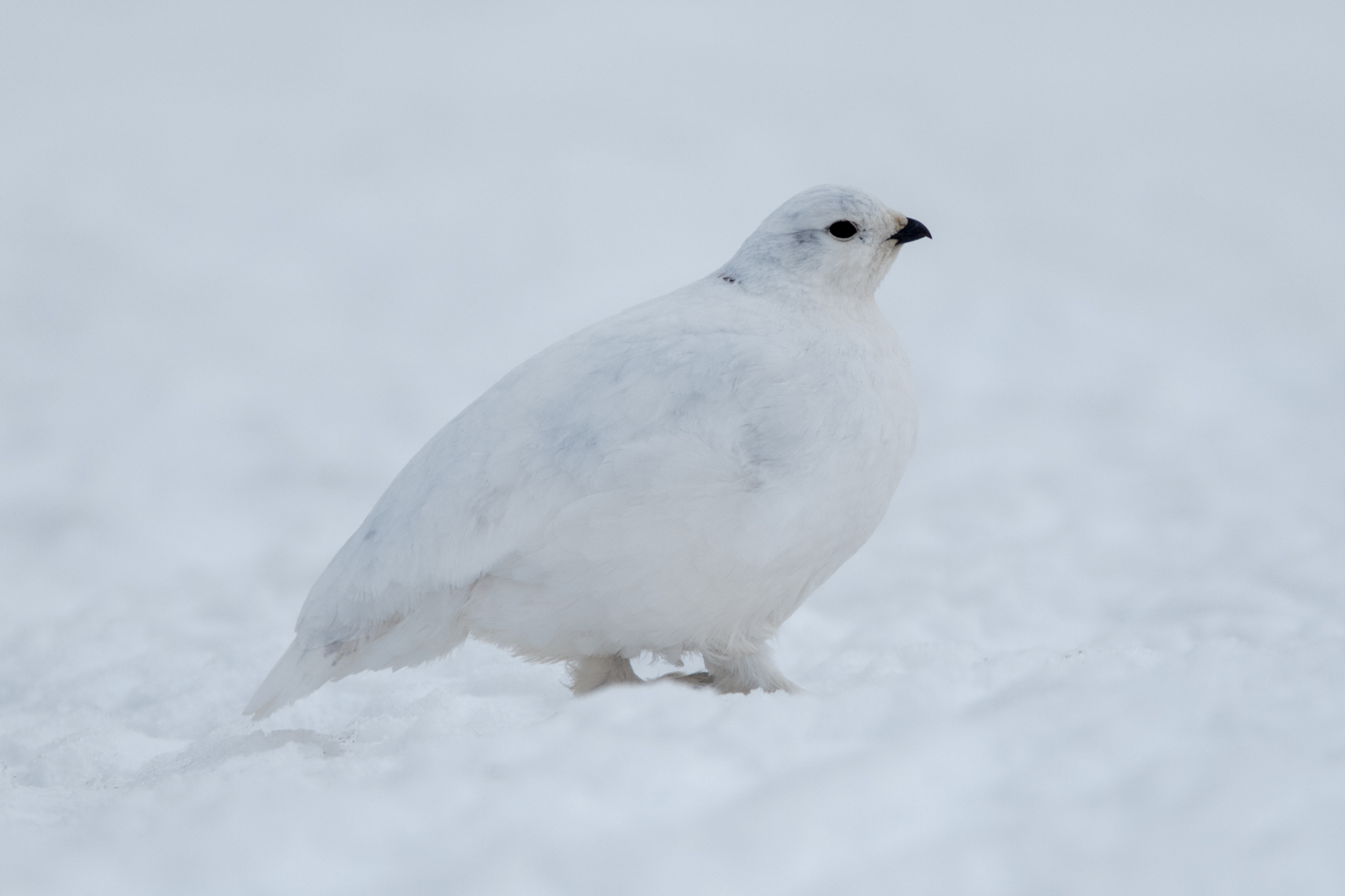
A white-tailed ptarmigan in fully-white winter plumage

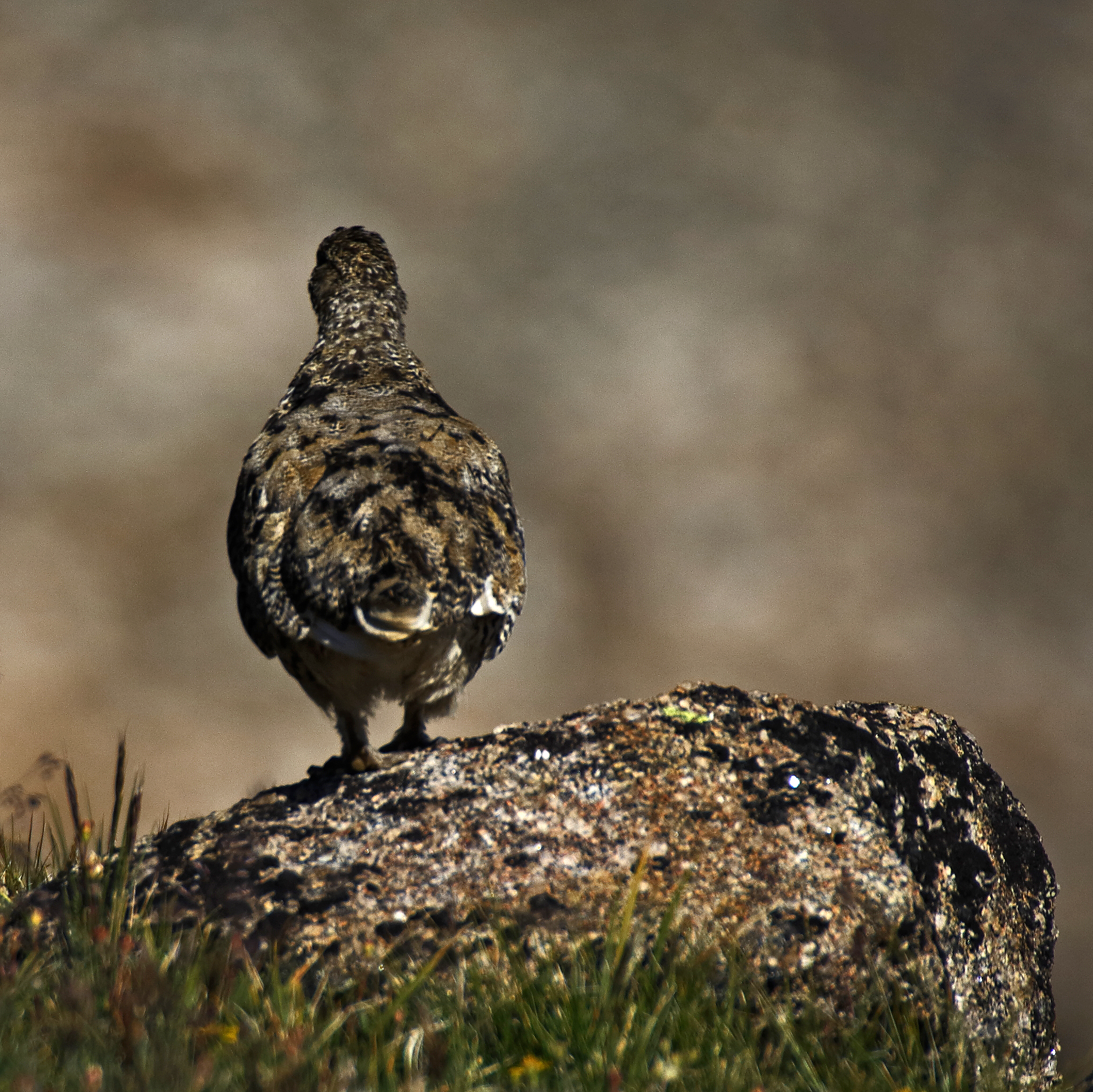
A ptarmigan displaying its natural camouflage, matching the patterns of the lichen covered rock of its environment

The white-tailed ptarmigan (Lagopus leucura), also known as the snow quail, is the smallest bird in the grouse tribe. It is a permanent resident of high altitudes on or above the tree line and is native to Alaska and the mountainous parts of Canada and the western United States. Its plumage is cryptic and varies at different times of the year. In the summer it is speckled in gray, brown and white whereas in winter it is wholly white. At all times of year the wings, belly and tail are white. The white-tailed ptarmigan has a diet of buds, leaves, flowers and seeds. The nest is a simple depression in the ground in which up to eight eggs are laid. After hatching, the chicks soon leave the nest. At first they eat insects but later move on to an adult diet, their mother using vocalisations to help them find suitable plant food. The population seems to be stable and the IUCN lists this species as being of Least Concern.

== Taxonomy and etymology ==
The white-tailed ptarmigan was given the scientific name Tetrao (Lagopus) leucurus by the Arctic explorer John Richardson in 1831. It was later determined that Lagopus had sufficient distinguishing features to be regarded as a separate genus and the bird became Lagopus leucurus. Molecular studies have shown that Lagopus is monophyletic, with the rock ptarmigan (Lagopus muta) and White-tailed ptarmigan being sister species. The position of the willow ptarmigan (Lagopus lagopus) is less clear cut, it showing some genetic divergence over its wide range.

The genus name Lagopus is derived from Ancient Greek lagos (λαγως), meaning "hare", + pous (πους), "foot", in reference to the bird's feathered legs. The species name leucura was for a long time misspelt leucurus, in the erroneous belief that the ending of Lagopus denotes masculine gender. However, as the Ancient Greek term λαγωπους is of feminine gender, and the species name has to agree with that, the feminine leucura is correct. The species name leucura is derived from the Latinized version of the Greek leukos, meaning "white" and oura, meaning "tail", in reference to the bird's permanently white tail.

The white-tailed ptarmigan has five recognized subspecies:

- L. l. altipetens (Osgood, 1901)
- L. l. leucura (Richardson, 1831)
- L. l. peninsularis (Chapman, 1902)
- L. l. rainierensis (Taylor W, 1920)
- L. l. saxatilis (Cowan, 1939)

== Description ==
The white-tailed ptarmigan is the smallest of the ptarmigans and the smallest bird in the grouse tribe. It is a stocky bird with rounded wings, square-ended tail, small black beak and short legs with feathering extending to the toes. Adults are 31 to 34 centimetres (12 to 13 in) long, with the males being only slightly larger than the females. The average weight is 325 grams (11.5 oz). During the summer, the white-tailed ptarmigan is a speckled grayish brown with white underparts, tail and wings. In the fall, the plumage has turned a much more reddish-brown color and white feathers begin to grow through. By winter all the summer brown feathers are lost and the bird is completely white. A further molt in the spring precedes the breeding season and the bird returns to its summer plumage. The finely barred greyish coloration on the back makes it easy to distinguish this species from the much browner willow ptarmigan and rock ptarmigan. Both sexes maintain white tail and wing feathers all the year and males can be identified by their reddish eyecombs (fleshy growths above the eye), also present year-long. In general this bird is silent but it sometimes makes quiet, low-pitched hoots and soft clucking noises.

== Distribution ==
The white-tailed ptarmigan is an alpine species, a permanent resident of the high mountains above or near the timber line. It occupies open country and flies a great deal more than forest grouse, but still prefers running to flying. It ranges from Alaska and western Canada south to northern New Mexico. Males return from their wintering areas to establish territories on spruce-willow timber line breeding grounds in April. Females arrive in early May and pairs are formed.

The white-tailed ptarmigan is the only bird in North America to reside permanently in the alpine zone. Its habitat includes areas of boulders, krummholz, snowfields, rock slides, frost-heaved soil and upland herbage. Even in winter it stays in high valleys and mountain slopes where alder, willow, birch and spruce poke through the snow cover.

The white-tailed ptarmigan was introduced into the Sierra Nevada of California and Uinta Mountains of Utah in the 1970s. It may have been native here during the early Pleistocene but became locally extinct due to climate changes with greater snow-cover in spring impacting on its breeding season. Alternatively, it may have been unable to colonize the Sierra Nevada because of the barriers provided by the Columbia River and the Great Basin, and the low altitudes of the intervening South Cascades.

The white-tailed ptarmigan was first introduced into Oregon's Wallowa Mountains with 36 birds taken from Colorado and Washington in September 1967. A second set of 54 birds was released in September 1968 that were supplied from Colorado and British Columbia. Although a few of the birds were observed in the spring and summer of 1969 the effort to establish a population in Oregon was ultimately unsuccessful.

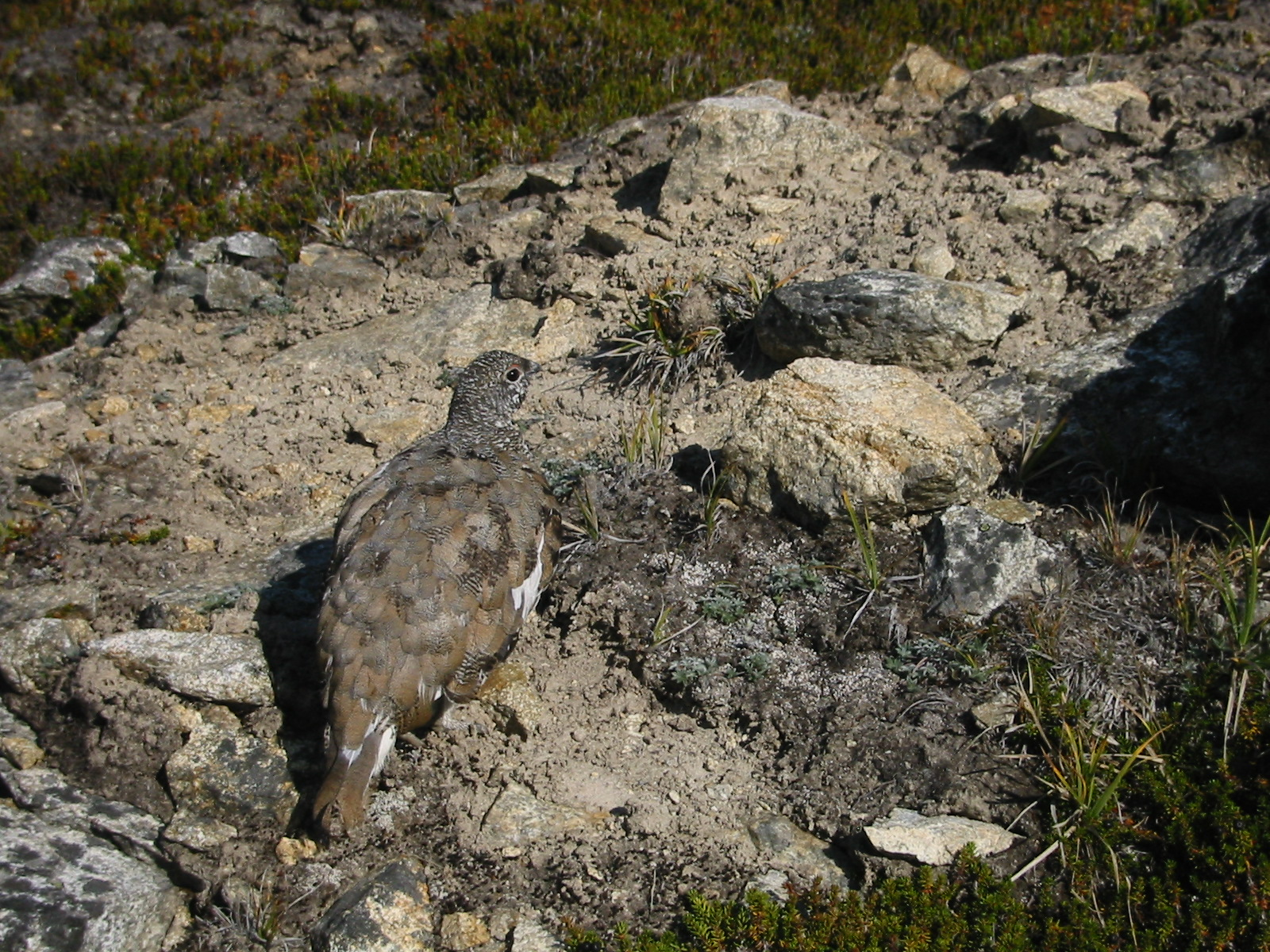
An individual with late summer plumage blends into subalpine tundra.

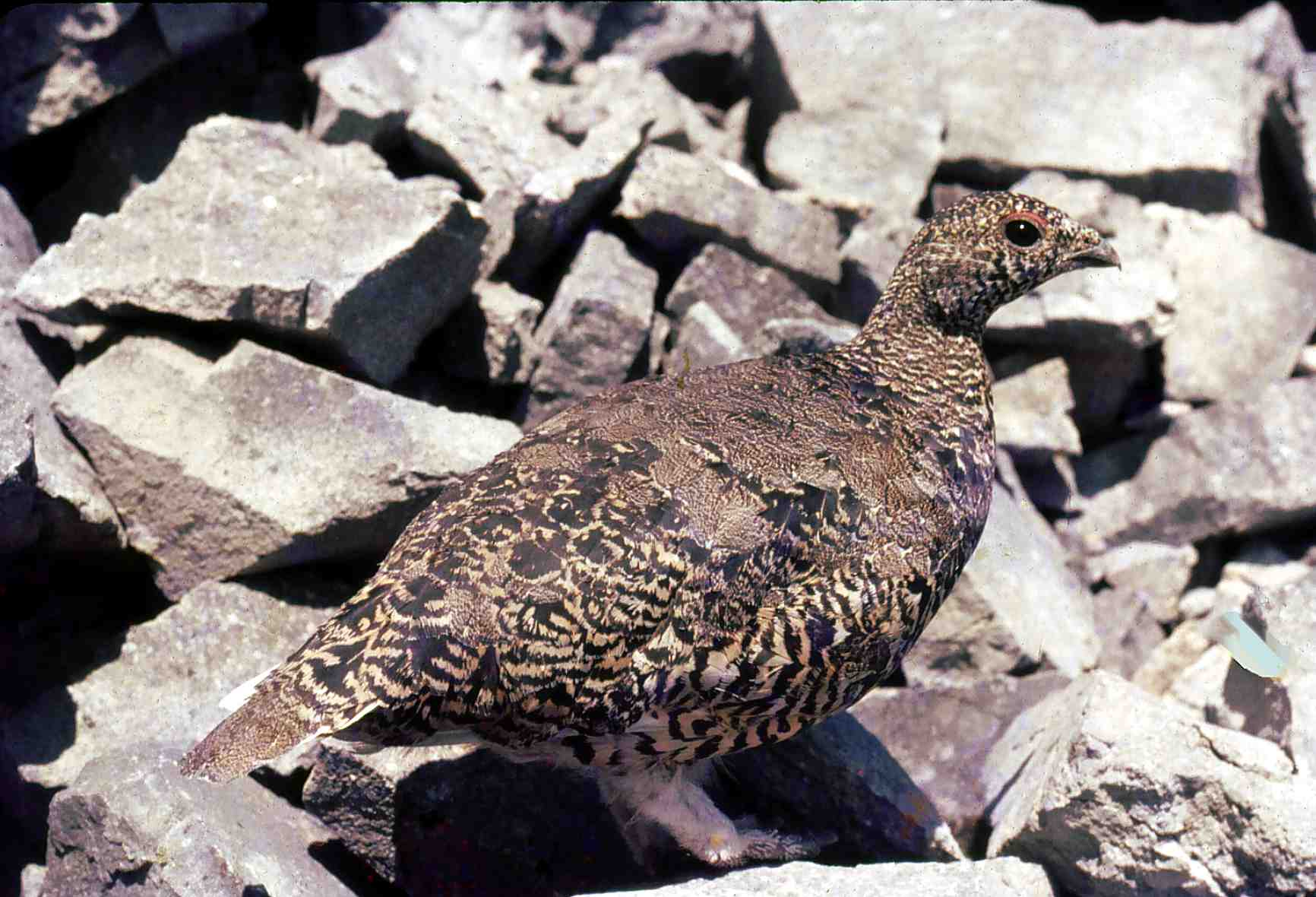
Full summer plumage

== Diet ==
This herbivorous bird's diet varies seasonally. Nitrogen-rich snow buttercup leaves are favored in the spring season, while willow catkins, mountain avens flowers, and chickweed blooms, other flowers and leaves, lichens and berries form the majority of the ptarmigan's diet in the summer. Once fall and winter arrive in the region, the ptarmigan feeds on pine needles, seeds, willow and alder buds and twigs. Winter food sources have a much higher cellulose content than does summer forage, so the ptarmigan relies on bacteria-aided digestion in the cecum to extract essential nutrients. During the summer, the ptarmigan eats grit to assist in digesting plant material.

== Breeding ==
White-tailed ptarmigan males are usually monogamous and remain with the same mate for one breeding season. To attract females, a male will strut and display his tail feathers. The female builds a simple scrape nest on the ground, while the male acts as a sentry to guard the area. The nest is a shallow depression in a snow-free area, generally protected from the wind and is softened with grasses and a few feathers. One side of the nest generally provides a quick escape route.

A clutch consists of two to eight eggs, which retain a cinnamon color for most of the incubation period, but develop brown spots when they are nearly ready to hatch. Males remain in the vicinity of the nest until the eggs hatch, a period of about 23 days. The precocial young leave the nest six to twelve hours after hatching. They are at first covered with down but become fully fledged in seven to ten days.

Ptarmigan chicks begin their lives eating insects. Once the chicks' digestive tracts and ceca are more fully developed, their diets shift to one of flowers and leaves. Hens choose foraging patches where plant species containing proteins are abundant. The hens call their chicks to these plants, which are critical for the growth and development of the chicks. This suggests that the hens' food calls assist in enhancing survival rates of juvenile ptarmigans. The young birds remain with their mother throughout the summer and autumn season.

== Adaptations and status ==
The white-tailed ptarmigan is well-camouflaged when on the ground. In his pioneering 1909 book on the subject, Concealing-Coloration in the Animal Kingdom, the American artist Abbott Thayer wrote:

There is perhaps no other bird which moults as gradually as the Ptarmigan, and this fact goes very far to strengthen the supposition that it has developed a peculiarly fluid and perfect system of protective coloration. Figs. 8, 9, 10 and 39 show White-tailed Ptarmigans, of the Rocky Mountains, in winter and transitional plumages... Supremely beautiful and potent is the grass-pattern of this same species in summer plumage... This pattern ... is achieved by light-brown marginal bands, with a few small internal spots, on the dark feathers of the upper parts; the predominance of light and dark being gradually reversed as the lower breast is approached. The belly is entirely white, as are the quill feathers of the wings and tail.

— Thayer

The white-tailed ptarmigan has feathers located on its feet to serve as protection from the extreme cold often experienced in the alpine tundra environment. In addition, these birds have feathers around their nostrils to warm the air prior to entry into the respiratory tract. The most obvious adaptation is this bird's cryptic coloration, which enables it to blend in with its environment and avoid predation by golden eagles or other birds of prey. To conserve energy during the winter months, the ptarmigan avoids flight as much as possible and roosts in snowbanks.

The white-tailed ptarmigan is listed as being of Least Concern by the International Union for Conservation of Nature. This is because, although populations may be in slight decline, its range is too wide and the total number of birds too large to fit the criteria for being listed as Vulnerable. This bird serves as an indicator species for the alpine tundra, and denotes overall ecosystem health. It is not a conservation concern and is abundant in alpine zones across North America, indicating that this region is not undergoing dramatic climatic, temperature, or precipitation shifts. The lack of overgrazing by cattle, the lack of human development in alpine zones, the difficulty in accessing its remote habitat, the low densities at which it occurs and the laws regarding the limits to hunting bags allow the white-tailed ptarmigan to thrive.
