= Serebrovsky =

Serebrovsky is a Russian surname. Notable people with the surname include:

- Alexander Serebrovsky (1884–1938), Soviet engineer
- Alexander Sergeevich Serebrovsky (1892–1948), Soviet geneticist
- Pavel Serebrovsky (1888–1942), Soviet ornithologist
