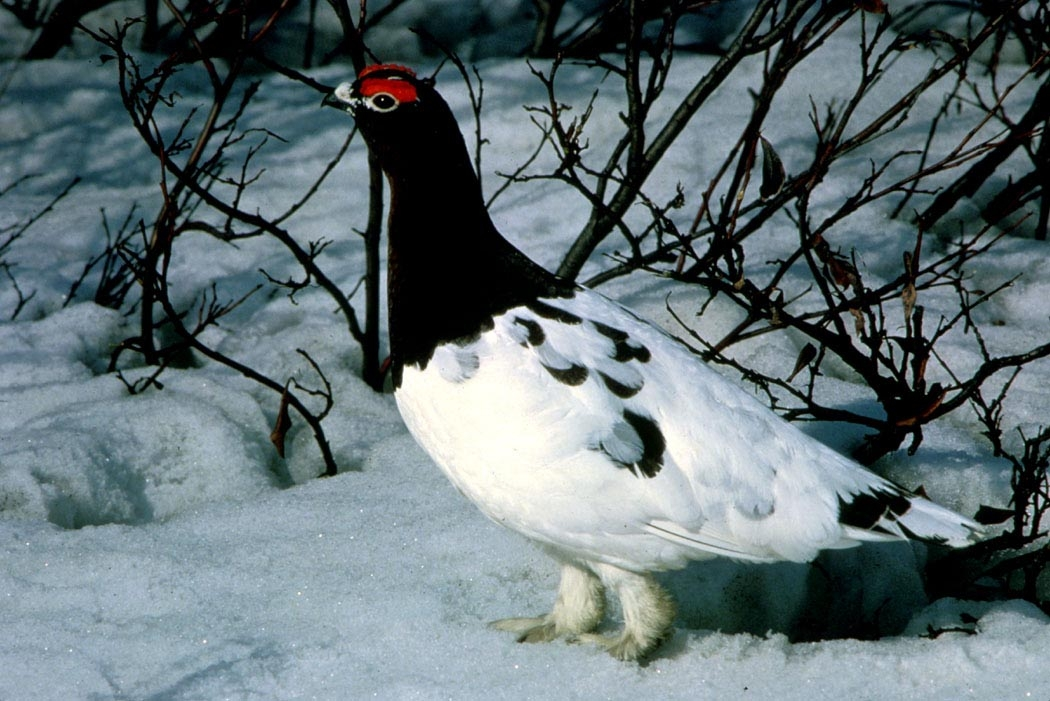
- Male L. l. alascensis in winter plumage

Conservation status
- Least Concern (IUCN 3.1)

Scientific classification
- Kingdom: Animalia
- Phylum: Chordata
- Class: Aves
- Order: Galliformes
- Family: Phasianidae
- Genus: Lagopus
- Species: L. lagopus

Binomial name
- Lagopus lagopus (Linnaeus, 1758)
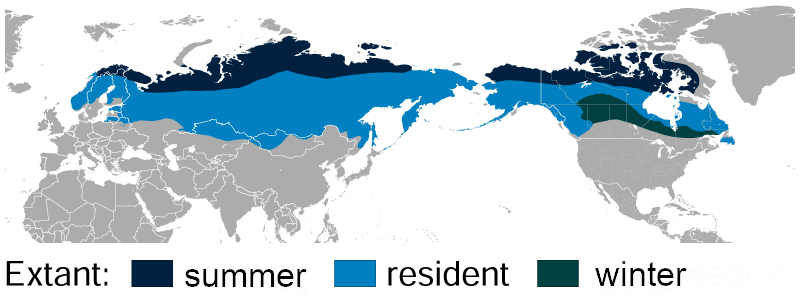
- Willow ptarmigan range

Synonyms
- Lagopus albus; Lagopus medius Woldřich, 1893; Tetrao lagopus Linnaeus, 1758

= Willow ptarmigan =

- Adult Alaskan willow ptarmigan (L. l. alascensis) in summer plumage, Denali National Park

Species of bird

The willow ptarmigan (/ˈtɑːrmɪɡən/ TAR-mi-gən; Lagopus lagopus) is a bird in the grouse tribe Tetraonini of the pheasant family Phasianidae. It is also known as the willow grouse. The willow ptarmigan breeds in birch and other forests and moorlands in northern Europe, the tundra of Scandinavia, Siberia, Alaska, and Canada, in particular in the provinces of Newfoundland and Labrador and Quebec. It is the state bird of Alaska.

In the summer, the birds are largely brown, with dappled plumage, while in the winter, they are white with some black feathers in their tails. The species has remained little changed from the bird that roamed the tundra during the Pleistocene. Nesting takes place in the spring when clutches of four to 10 eggs are laid in a scrape on the ground. The chicks are precocial, so soon leave the nest. While they are young, both parents play a part in caring for them. The chicks eat insects and young plant growth, while the adults are completely herbivorous, eating leaves, flowers, buds, seeds, and berries during the summer and largely subsisting on the buds and twigs of willow and other dwarf shrubs and trees during the winter.

== Taxonomy ==
The willow ptarmigan was formally described in 1758 by Swedish naturalist Carl Linnaeus in the 10th edition of his Systema Naturae under the binomial name Tetrao lagopus. He specified the type locality as "Europae alpinis", but this has been restricted to Sweden. The willow ptarmigan is now one of four species placed in the genus Lagopus that was introduced in 1760 by the French zoologist Mathurin Jacques Brisson. Lagopus is Latin for a ptarmigan. The word originally came from Ancient Greek λαγωπους (lagōpous) meaning "hare-footed", from λαγως (lagōs) meaning "hare" and πους (pous), ποδος (podos) meaning "foot".

The taxonomy of this species is confused, partly because of the complicated changes in plumage several times a year and the differing color and pattern of the summer plumage:

Fifteen subspecies are recognised:

- L. l. alascensis Swarth, 1926 – Alaska (US)
- L. l. alba (Gmelin, JF, 1789) – north Canada
- L. l. alexandrae Grinnell, 1909 – Aleutian Islands, Kodiak Island, south, southeast Alaskan islands (US) and northwest British Columbia (Canada)
- L. l. alleni Stejneger, 1884 – Newfoundland (Canada)
- L. l. brevirostris Hesse, 1912 – east Kazakhstan to central south Siberia and west Mongolia
- L. l. koreni Thayer & Bangs, 1914 – Siberia to Kamchatka Peninsula
- L. l. kozlowae Portenko, 1931 – north Mongolia and south Siberia
- L. l. lagopus (Linnaeus, 1758) – Scandinavia and north Russia
- L. l. leucoptera Taverner, 1932 – northernmost Canada and its Arctic islands
- L. l. maior Lorenz, T, 1904 – north Kazakhstan and southwest Siberia
- L. l. okadai Momiyama, 1928 – Sakhalin (Russia)
- L. l. rossica Serebrovski, 1926 – Baltic states to central Russia
- L. l. sserebrowsky Domaniewski, 1933 – northeast Mongolia to southeast Siberia and northeast China
- L. l. ungavus Riley, 1911 – northeast Canada
- L. l. variegata Salomonsen, 1936 – islets off west Norway

The willow ptarmigan often hybridises with the black grouse (Lyrurus tetrix) or the hazel grouse (Tetrastes bonasia) and occasionally with the western capercaillie (Tetrao urogallus), the spruce grouse (Canachites canadensis), and the rock ptarmigan (Lagopus muta).

During the Pleistocene, the willow ptarmigan widely occurred in continental Europe. Authors who recognize paleosubspecies have named the Pleistocene willow ptarmigan L. l. noaillensis (though the older name medius might be the correct one). These marginally different birds are said to have gradually changed from the earlier (Pliocene) Lagopus atavus into the present-day species L. lagopus. Pleistocene willow ptarmigan are recorded from diverse sites until the end of the Vistulian glaciation about 10,000 years ago, when the species, by then all but identical with the living birds, retreated northwards with its tundra habitat. Additionally, mitochondrial DNA of the willow ptarmigan has been recovered from permafrost in the Yukon Territory.

== Description ==
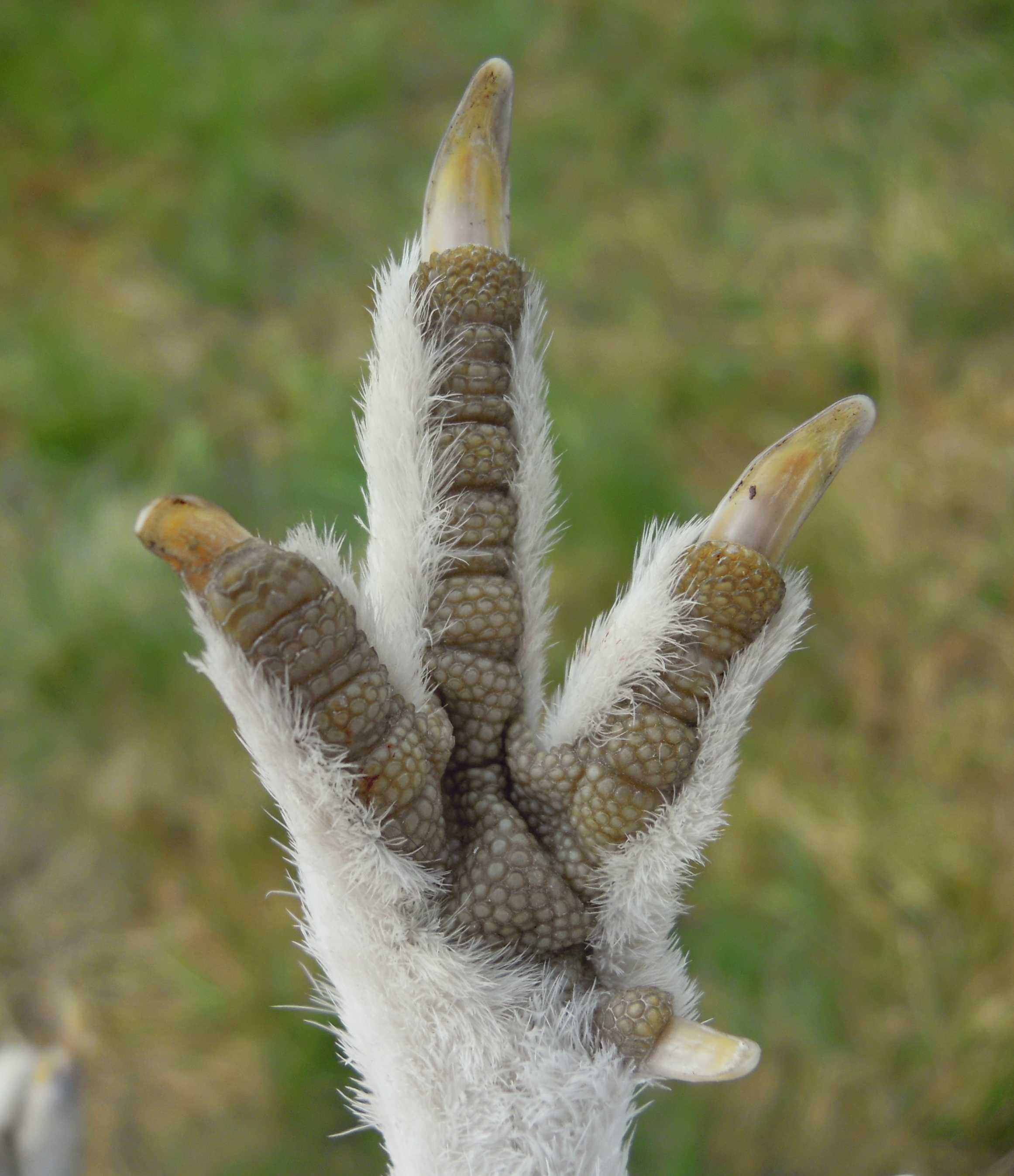
L. l. lagopus foot, covered with dense feathers

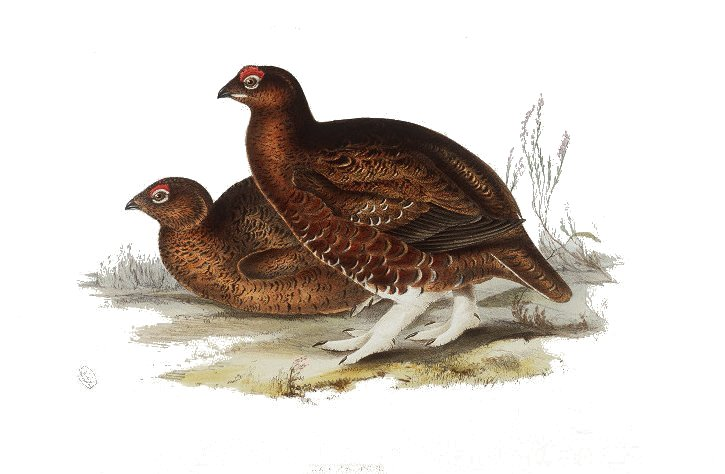
Red grouse, L. l. scoticus, plumage shows less white than other subspecies

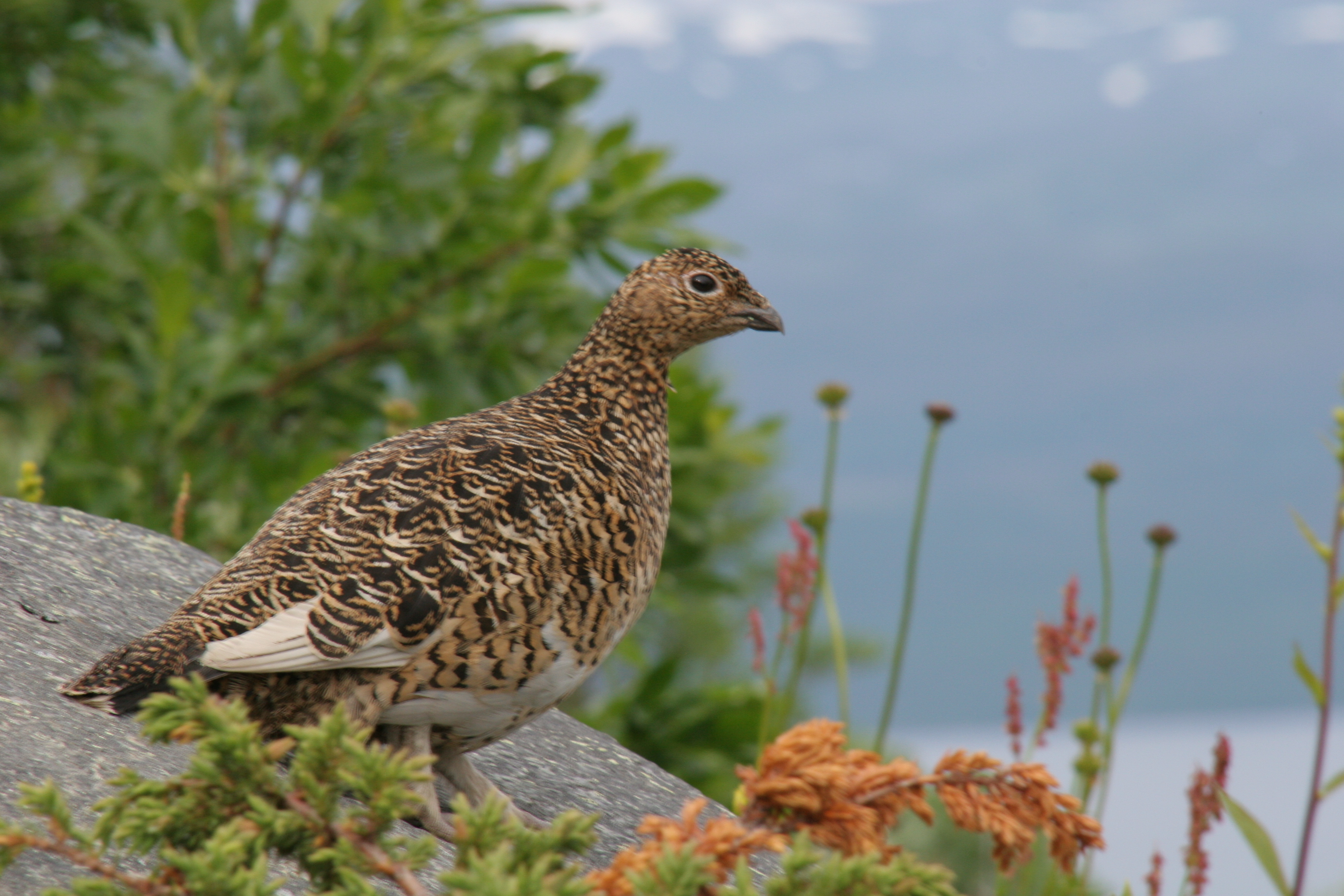
Female L. l. lagopus in summer plumage

The willow ptarmigan is a medium to large, ground-dwelling bird and is the most numerous of the three species of ptarmigan. Males and females are about the same size, with the adult length varying between 35 and 44 cm (14 and 17 in) with a wingspan ranging from 60 to 65 cm (24 to 26 in). Its weight is 430 to 810 g (15 to 29 oz). It is deep-chested and has a fairly long neck, a broad bill, short, feathered legs, and a moderately short, rounded tail. In the summer, the male's plumage is marbled brown, with a reddish hue to the neck and breast, a black tail, and white wings and underparts. It has red, semicircular combs above the eyes, which become red and prominent in the breeding season. The female is similar in appearance, but with much smaller eye combs and has brown feathers scattered among the white feathers on her belly. During winter, the body plumage and two central tail feathers of both sexes becomes completely white, except for the black outer rectrices. Their wing feathers remain white all year round. Immature birds resemble the adults.

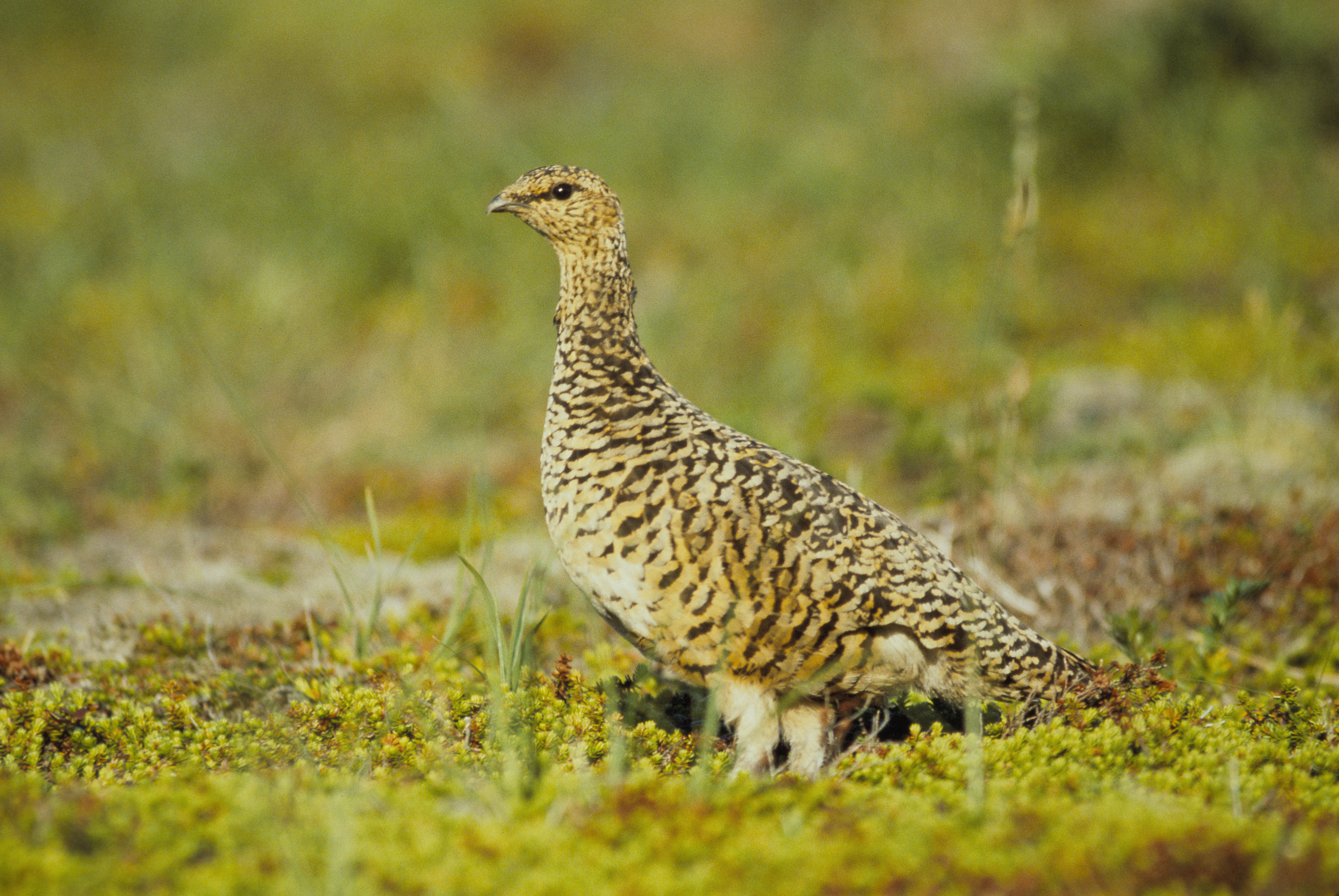
Female in summer plumage, Alaska

The willow ptarmigan can be distinguished from the closely related rock ptarmigan (L. muta) by its larger size and thicker bill and because it is not generally found above the tree line, while the rock ptarmigan prefers more elevated, barren habitat. The summer plumage is browner, and in the winter, the male willow ptarmigan lacks the rock ptarmigan's black stripe between the eyes and bill. The white-tailed ptarmigan (L. leucura) in North America is smaller, has a white tail and finely-barred greyer plumage, and lives permanently above the tree line. The distinctive red grouse of the British Isles was once considered to be a subspecies. This moorland bird is reddish brown all over, except for its white feet.

The voice is low-pitched and guttural and includes chuckles, repeated clucking sounds, and expostulations. When displaying, the male makes rattles and barking noises.

== Distribution and habitat ==
The willow ptarmigan has a circumboreal distribution. It is native to Canada and the United States, China, Mongolia, the Russian Federation, Kazakhstan, the Czech Republic, Finland, Norway, Sweden, Estonia, Latvia, and Lithuania. It primarily occupies subalpine and subarctic habitats such as sparse pine and birch forests, thickets with willow and alder trees, heather moors, tundra, and mountain slopes. In the winter, females and subadults may move to lower altitudes and seek shelter in valleys or in more densely vegetated areas, but adult males usually remain in subalpine regions. The red grouse is common on heather-clad moorland across the north and west of Great Britain and in localised areas of Ireland.

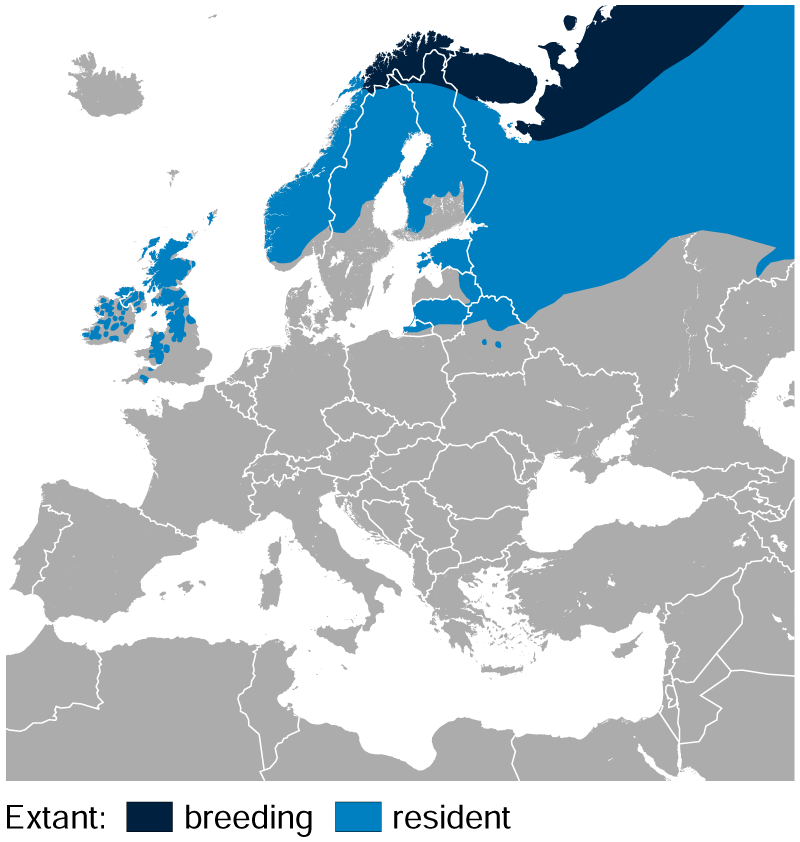
Distribution in Europe

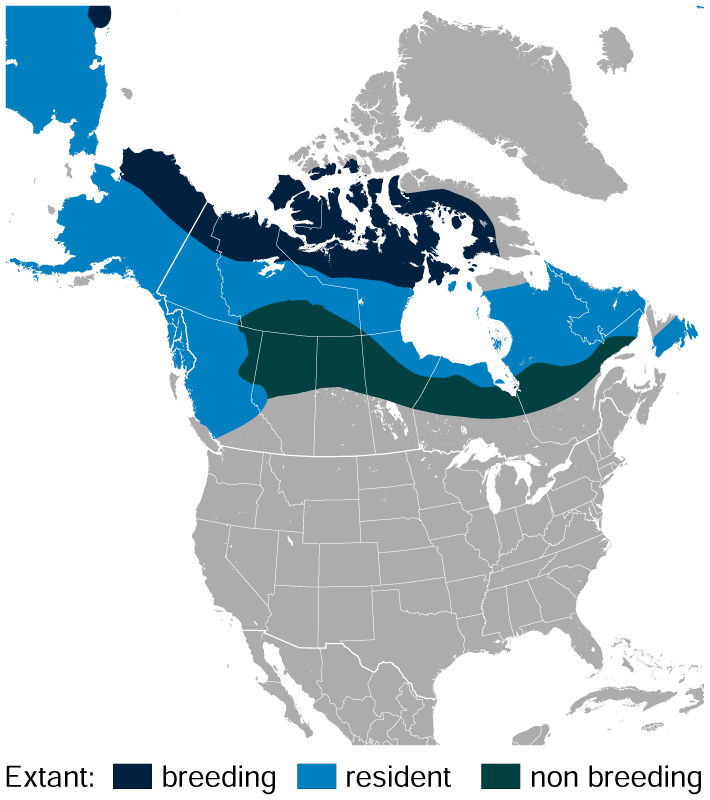
Distribution in North America

== Diet ==
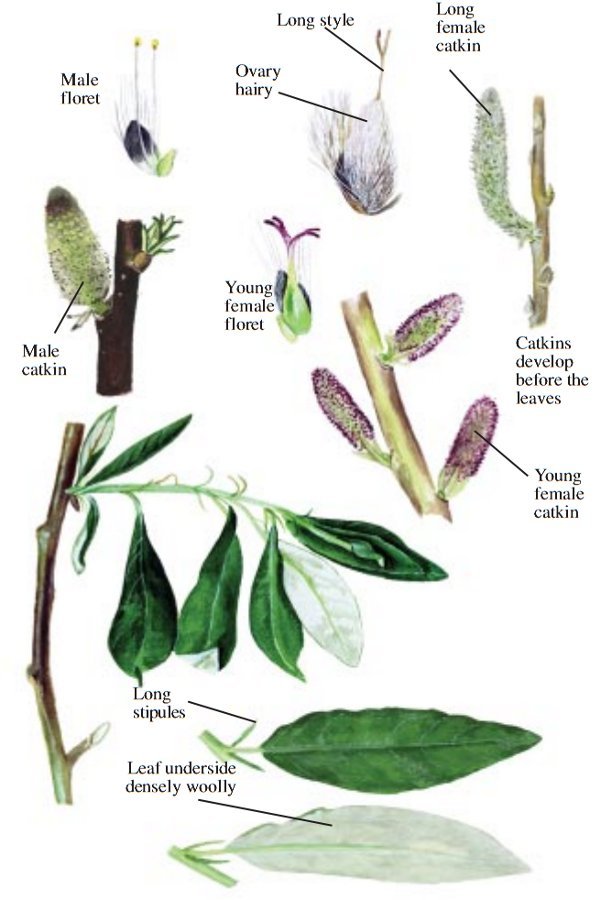
Alaska willow with twigs, leaves, buds, and catkins

The willow ptarmigan has a varied and seasonal diet. The bird is herbivorous for most of its life and subsists on various plant materials. As juveniles, they may feed on insects due to an inability to digest plant material caused by underdeveloped ceca. In the summer, their diet is highly varied and may consist of berries, flowers, leaves, twigs, and seeds.

In Alaska, the main dietary item of the adults at all times of year is willows such as the Alaska willow Salix alaxensis, with leaves being eaten in summer and buds, twigs and catkins supplying the birds' main nutritional needs in winter and early spring. In the early 21st century, an increase in shrub expansion in arctic Alaska is thought to be greatly affecting the willow ptarmigan's winter diet. Because of the way they browse, ptarmigan help shape the landscape of the area. After heavy snowfalls, the birds cannot access the shorter shrubs, as they are blanketed with snow, so they eat the taller species that poke through. One study found that 90% of the buds of the Alaska willow within their reach had been browsed. This stunts the willows and creates a feedback cycle extending through the entire ecosystem. In winters with below average snowfall, though, the browsing of ptarmigan does not have such a drastic effect, as their feeding is spread out across a range of lower plant species. The greening of parts of the Arctic is also thought to be affecting willow ptarmigan populations by altering the shape and size of the shrubs on which they are able to feed.

== Behavior ==
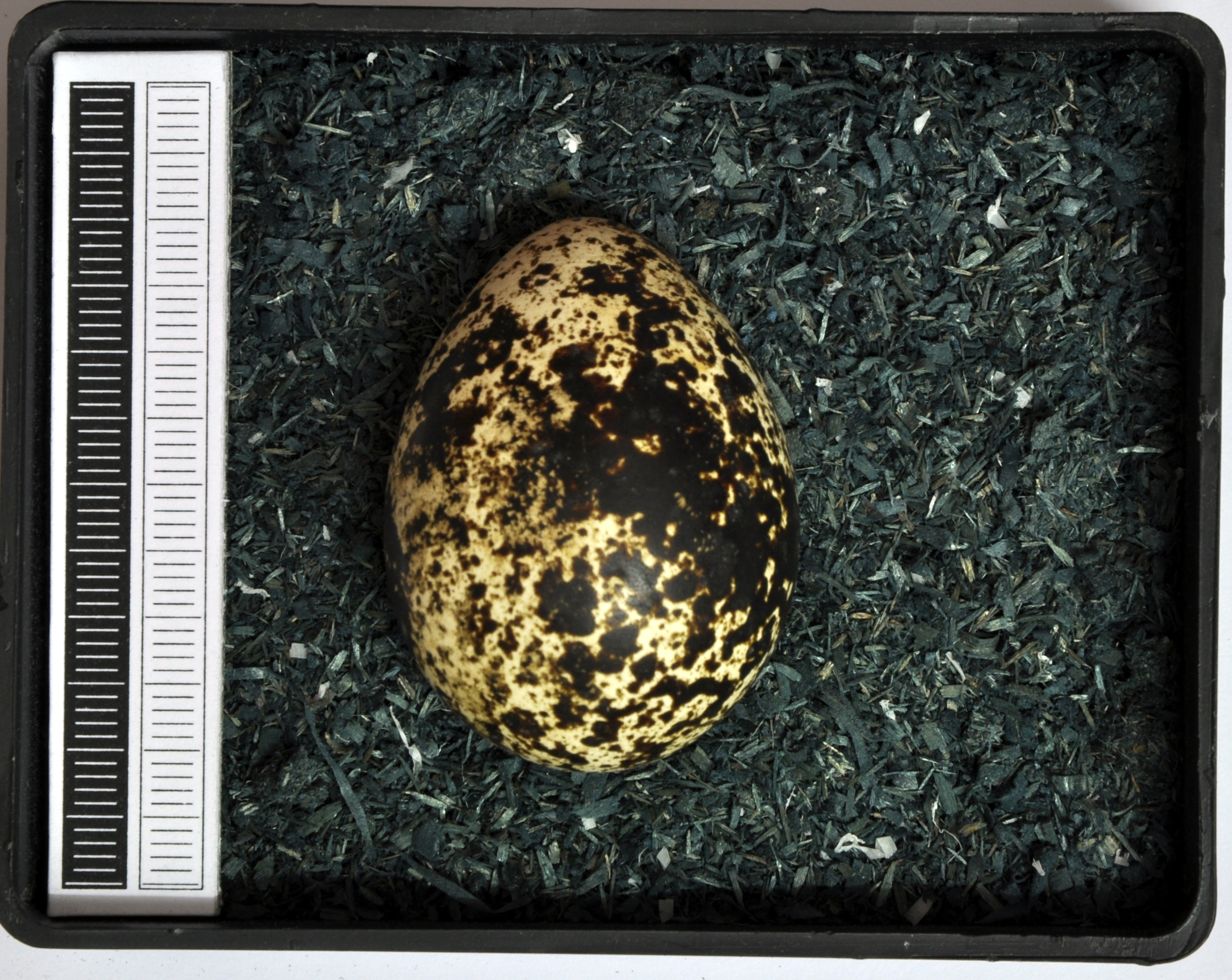
Egg, Collection Museum Wiesbaden

Male willow ptarmigans are territorial; they arrive in the breeding areas and set up territories in April and May, aggressively defending them against male interlopers. When the females arrive a few weeks later, the male performs courtship displays such as aerial manoeuvres, strutting and tail-fanning. When she has chosen a mate and a nesting site, the female lays a clutch of six to 10 eggs in a shallow depression on the ground. The nest site is usually in a hidden location at the edge of a clearing.

A small minority of male willow ptarmigan is polygynous, but most are monogamous. They are assiduous at guarding both nest and mate, particularly early in the incubation period and when the eggs are nearly ready to hatch. During this time, the greatest danger may be from conspecifics. Although adult willow ptarmigan are herbivores, the newly hatched young also feed on insects. In most other species of grouse, only the female takes care of the young, but the male willow ptarmigan also helps with feeding the brood and protecting them. He may take over completely if the female dies. In particular, the male defends the young from predators and both his mate and he can dive bomb intruders or lure attackers away by pretending to have a broken wing. Nevertheless, the chicks face many dangers that range from attacks by foxes or birds of prey, to getting separated from the rest of the brood, bad weather, and coccidiosis. Fewer than 35% of chicks survive to 11 months and only a minority of these reaches maturity. Despite this, in favourable seasons, many juveniles may survive and the population of willow ptarmigan is prone to wide fluctuations in number. By September, families begin to form flocks. The females and young migrate to lower altitudes and may overwinter 100 miles (160 km) from their breeding grounds in wooded valleys and hilly country. The males also congregate in small groups, but do not usually travel as far as the females.

== Cold adaptations ==
The willow ptarmigan has several behavioral and physiological adaptations that help it survive the long Arctic winter, such as large pectoral muscles that aid in shivering. These pectoral muscles grow quickly during the first few days of the ptarmigan's life, meaning that the ptarmigan chicks progress from having no thermoregulatory ability at hatch to being able to maintain their normal body temperature for hours at 10 °C (50 °F) when they are 2 weeks old. The rapid increase in m. pectoralis size is caused by increases in muscle fiber diameter (hypertrophy), and cold exposure is not necessary for this muscle development to occur. Ptarmigan also have thick plumage with feather barbules that contain air-filled cavities, contributing to a low heat loss, which aids in thermoregulation while the bird is roosting in burrows in the snow. Ptarmigan can withstand the severe cold because the ambient temperature in the sheltered microclimate of their snow burrows typically exceeds their lower critical temperature.

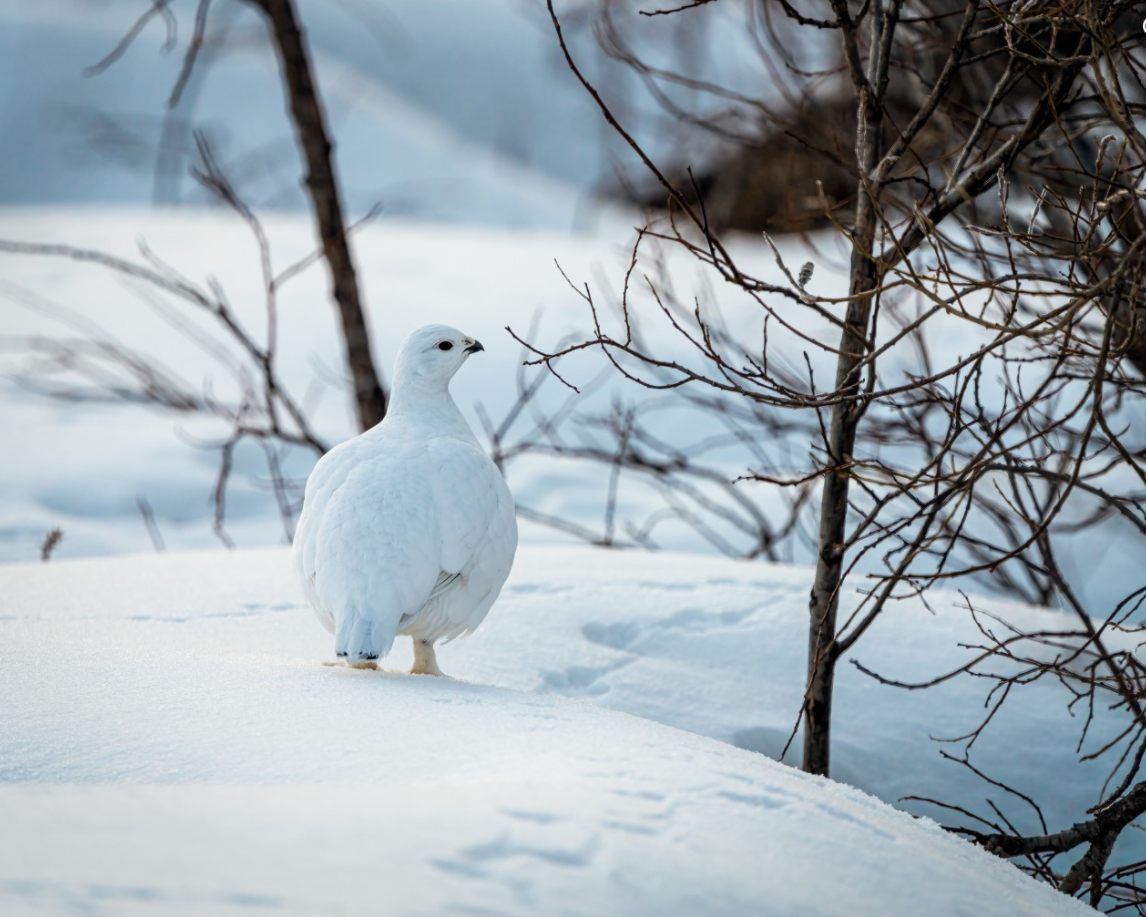
Winter plumage, Kenai National Wildlife Refuge, Alaska

== Status ==
Widespread and not uncommon in its remote habitat, the willow ptarmigan is classified as a species of least concern by the IUCN because even if numbers are declining slightly, it has a very wide range with a total population estimated at 40 million individuals.

== Title bird ==
The willow ptarmigan was adopted as the state bird of Alaska in 1955. It is also the regional bird of Southern Lapland.

== In popular culture ==
Users of TikTok and other social-media platforms have noted that the willow ptarmigan's distinctive call sounds like the expression awebo, a corruption of the vulgar Mexican Spanish slang phrase a huevo. The species has gained popular recognition as "the awebo bird" or simply the "awebo".

== See also ==
- Chicken, Alaska, was originally going to be named "Ptarmigan" in 1902, but town founders could not agree on how to spell it.
