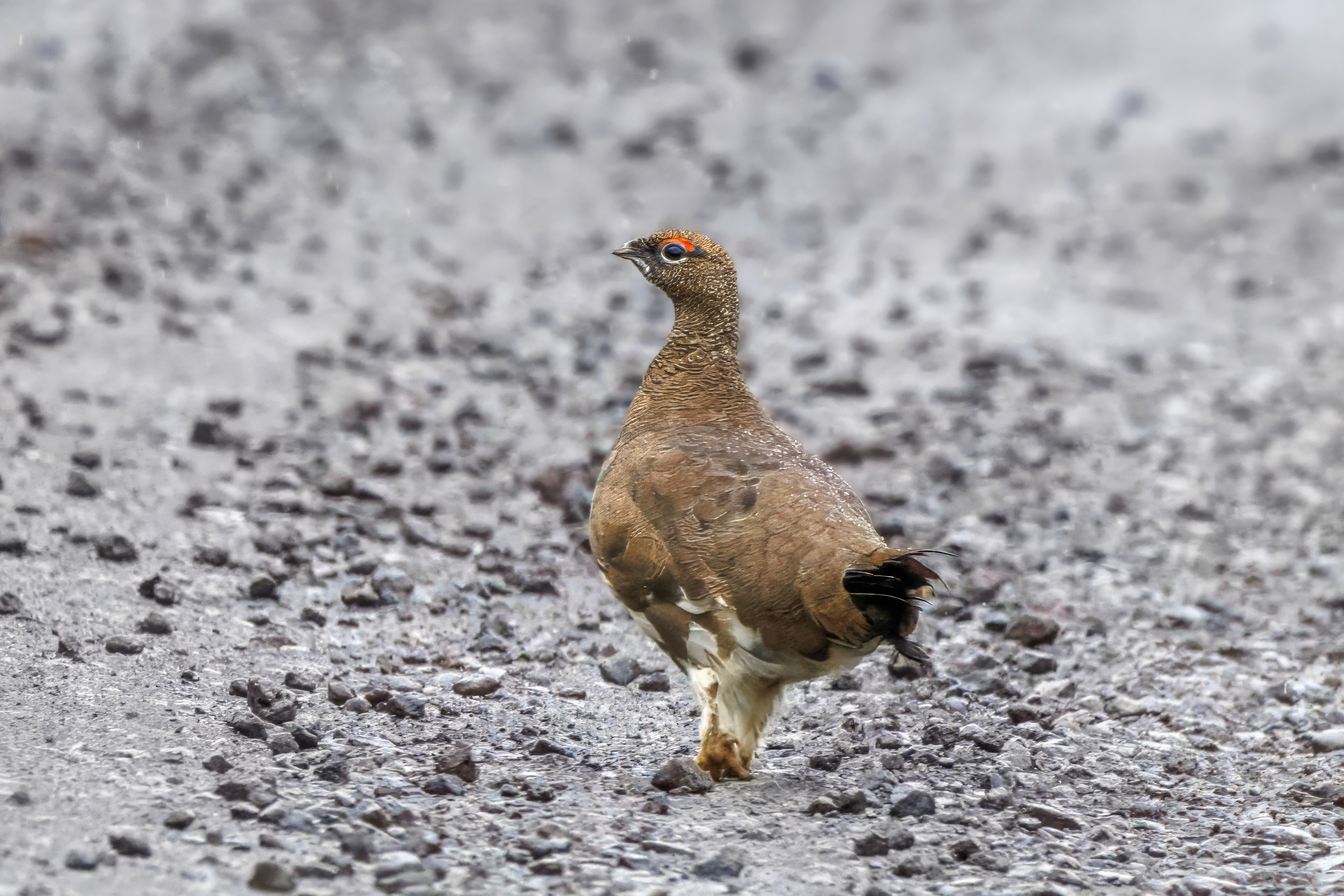
- L. m. islandorum female in breeding/summer plumage
- Display song, Glenshee, Scotland

Conservation status
- Least Concern (IUCN 3.1)

Scientific classification
- Kingdom: Animalia
- Phylum: Chordata
- Class: Aves
- Order: Galliformes
- Family: Phasianidae
- Genus: Lagopus
- Species: L. muta

Binomial name
- Lagopus muta (Montin, 1781)

Subspecies
- some 20–30, including: L. m. muta (Montin, 1781) Scandinavian ptarmigan; L. m. rupestris (Gmelin, 1789) Canadian rock ptarmigan; L. m. helvetica (Thienemann, 1829) Alpine ptarmigan; L. m. japonica H. L. Clark, 1907 Japanese ptarmigan; L. m. millaisi Hartert, 1923 Scottish ptarmigan; L. m. hyperborea Sundevall, 1845 Svalbard ptarmigan
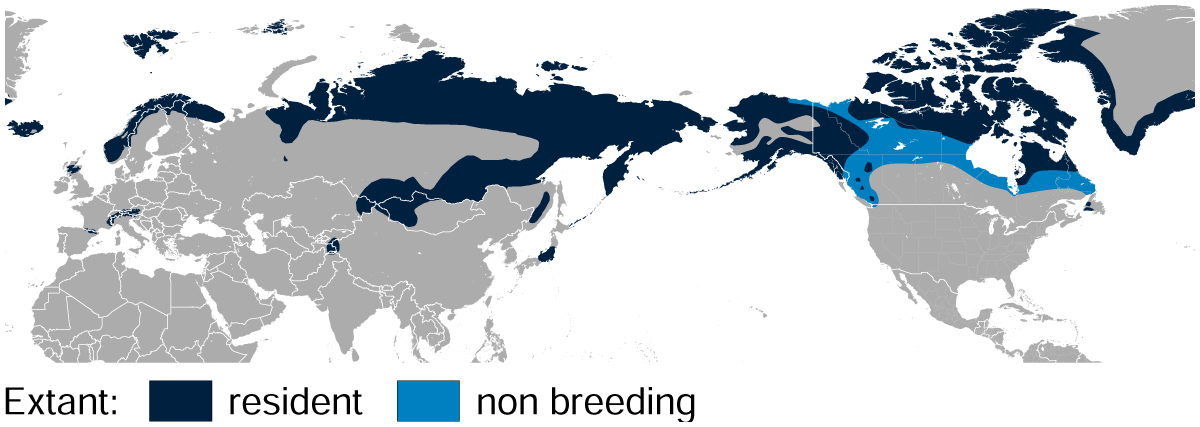
- Rock Ptarmigan range

Synonyms
- Tetrao mutus Montin, 1781; Lagopus mutus (lapsus, see below)

= Rock ptarmigan =

Species of bird

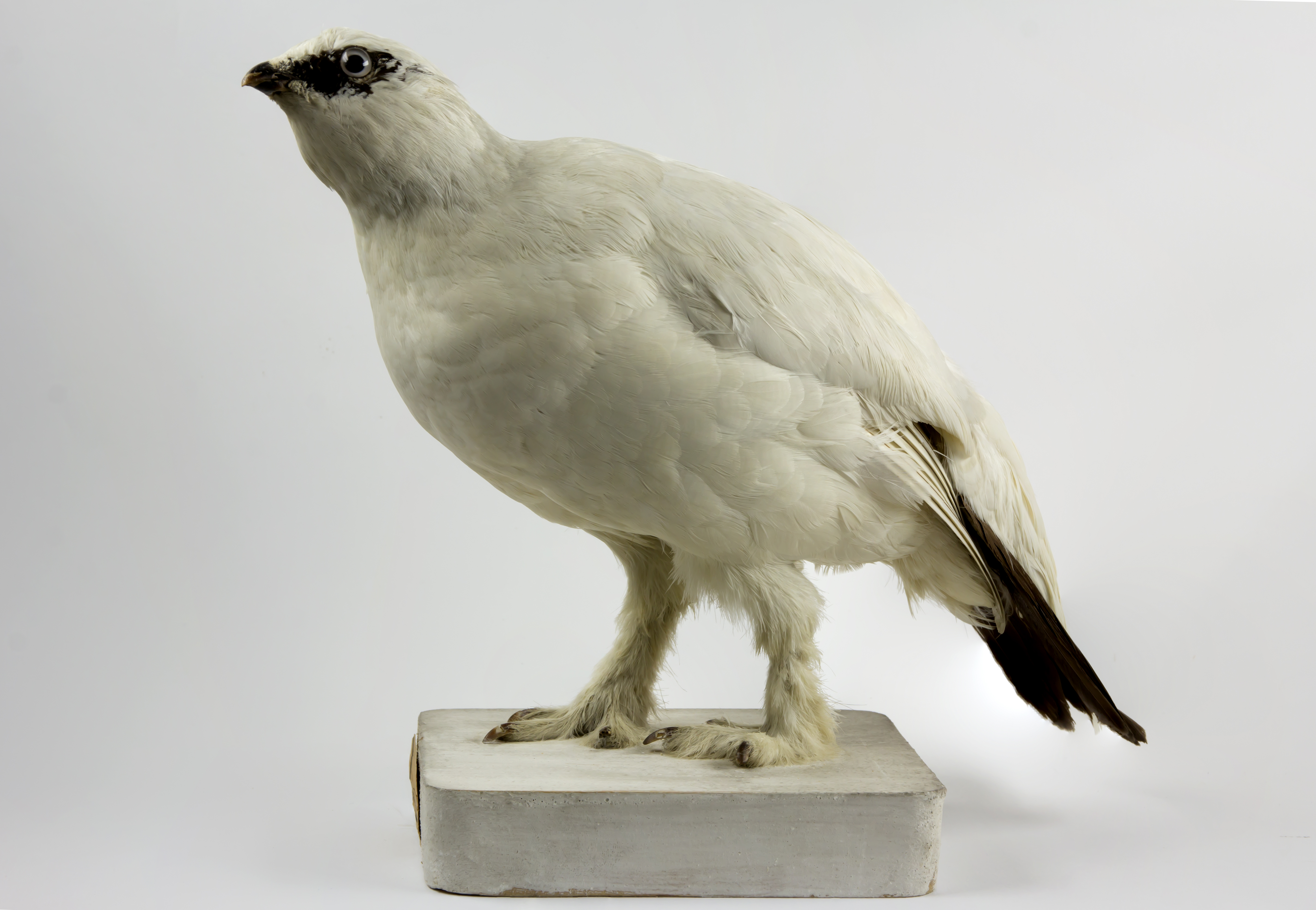
Lagopus muta pyrenaica – MHNT

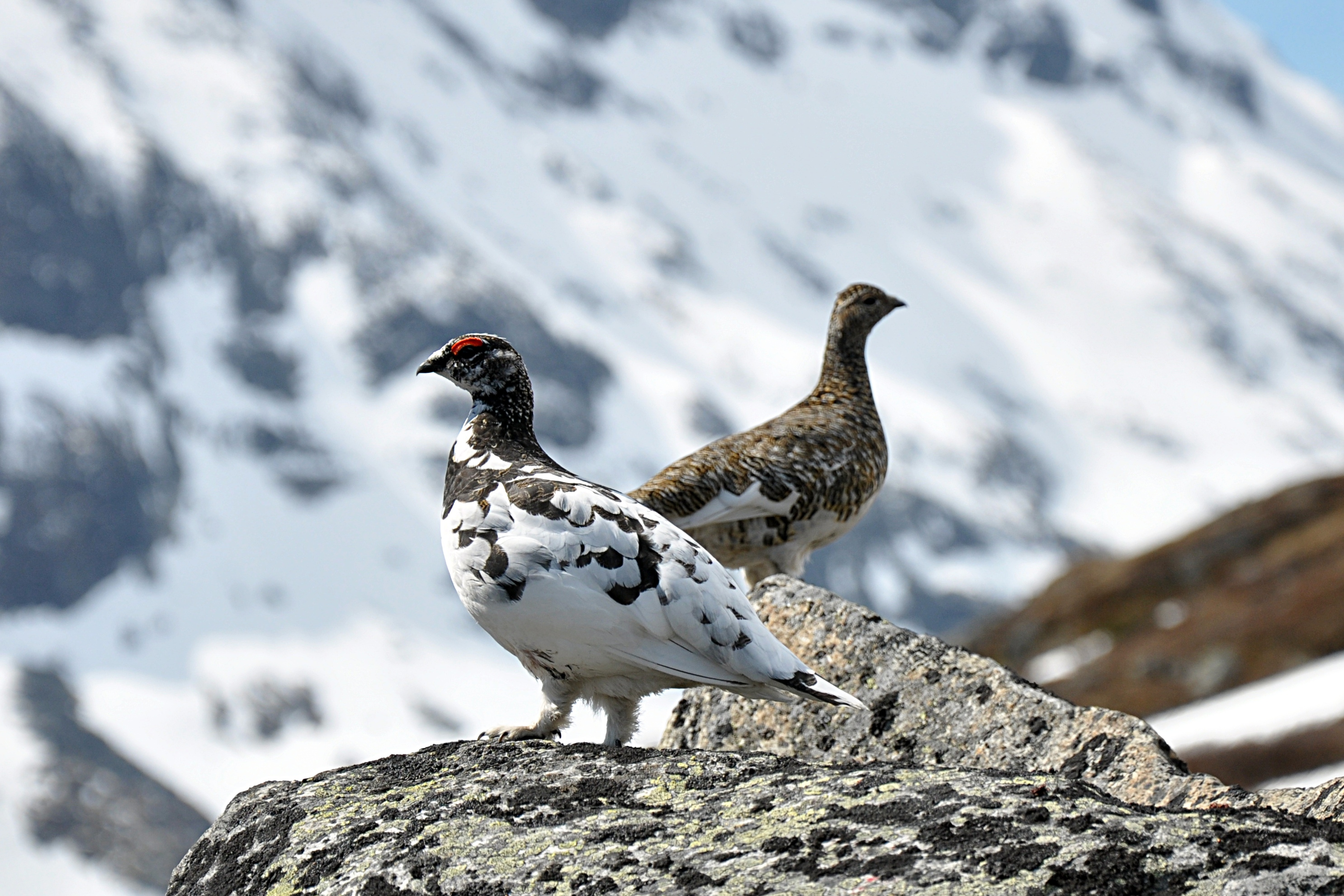
Pair in spring plumage in Norway

The rock ptarmigan (Lagopus muta) is a medium-sized game bird in the grouse tribe. It is known simply as the ptarmigan in Europe. It is the official bird for the Canadian territory of Nunavut, where it is known as the aqiggiq (ᐊᕿᒡᒋᖅ), and the official game bird for the province of Newfoundland and Labrador. In Japan, it is known as the raichō (雷鳥), which means "thunder bird"; it is the official bird of Gifu, Nagano, and Toyama Prefectures and is a protected species nationwide.

== Etymology ==
The ptarmigan's genus name, Lagopus, is derived from Ancient Greek lagos (λαγώς lagṓs), meaning "hare", + pous (πούς poús), "foot", in reference to the bird's feathered legs.

The species name, muta, comes from Neo-Latin and means "mute", referring to the simple croaking song of the male. It was for a long time misspelt mutus, in the erroneous belief that the ending of Lagopus denotes masculine gender. However, as the Ancient Greek term λαγώπους lagṓpous is of feminine gender, and the species name has to agree with that, the feminine muta is correct.

The word ptarmigan comes from the Gaelic tarmachan, meaning croaker. The p- was added due to a mistaken belief in a Greek origin, as if the word were related to Greek words like πτερόν (pterón), 'wing'.

== Description ==
The rock ptarmigan is 34–36 cm (13–14 in) long with an 8 cm (3.1 in) tail and with a wingspan of 54–60 cm (21–24 in) and a weight of 440–640 g (15.5–22.6 oz). It is about ten percent smaller than the willow ptarmigan.

The rock ptarmigan is camouflaged to match the seasons; its feathers moult from white in winter to grey and brown in spring or summer. The breeding male has greyish upper parts with white wings and underparts. In winter, its plumage becomes completely white except for the black outer tail feathers and eye line. It can be distinguished from the winter willow ptarmigan by habitat; the rock ptarmigan prefers higher elevations and more barren habitats. It also differs in its slender bill; males additionally have black lores, absent in the willow ptarmigan, though they are also absent in female rock ptarmigan.

== Taxonomy ==
The rock ptarmigan has 23 accepted subspecies:

- L. m. atkhensis (Turner, 1882) - Tanaga Island, Adak Island and Atka Island. (west-central of the Aleutian Islands, US)
- L. m. dixoni (Grinnell, 1909) - Glacier Bay Island and southeastern Alaska
- L. m. evermanni (Elliot D.G., 1896) - Attu Island of the west Aleutian Islands, US)
- L. m. gerasimovi (Red'kin, 2005) - Karaginskiy Island in Russia
- L. m. helvetica (Thienemann, 1829) - Alps
- L. m. hyperborea (Sundevall, 1845) - Svalbard (Norway) and Franz Josef Land (Russia)
- L. m. islandorum (Faber, 1822) - Iceland
- L. m. japonica (Clark A.H., 1907) - Honshu (Japan)
- L. m. kurilensis (Kuroda, 1924) - Kuril Island (Russia)
- L. m. macruros (Schiøler, 1925) - northeastern Greenland
- L. m. millaisi (Hartert, 1923) - Scotland
- L. m. muta (Montin, 1781) - northern Fennoscandia to Kola Peninsula (Russia)
- L. m. nadezdae (Serebrovski, 1926) - southern Siberia and northern Mongolia
- L. m. nelsoni (Stejneger, 1884) - Unimak and Unalaska Island (eastern Aleutian Islands, US) and southern Alaska
- L. m. pleskei (Serebrovski, 1926) - northern Siberia
- L. m. pyrenaica (Hartert, 1921) - central and eastern Pyrenees (France and Spain)
- L. m. reinhardi (Brehm C.L., 1824) - southern Greenland
- L. m. ridgwayi (Stejneger 1884) - Commander Island (Russia)
- L. m. rupestris (Gmelin J.F., 1789) - northern North America
- L. m. saturata (Salomonsen, 1950) - northwestern Greenland
- L. m. townsendi (Elliot D.G., 1896) - Kiska Island, Amchitka, Little Sitkin and Rat Island (western Aleutian Islands, US)
- L. m. welchi (Brewster, 1885) - Newfoundland (Canada)
- L. m. yunaskensis (Gabrielson & Lincoln, 1951) - Yunaska Island (central Aleutian Islands, US)

== Sounds and displays ==
Male rock ptarmigans emit a repertoire of guttural snores and rattles, most often directed to other males during breeding season. On open leks, single or multiple males also carry out displays on the ground and in the air to assert their territory, including chasing other males while flying.

Aerial courtship rituals involve fast forward flight with rapidly-beating wings followed by an upward glide, tail fanned out. The male, at the peak of the display, belts out a rasping "ah-AAH-ah-AAAAH-a-a-a-a-a-a!", with the sung latter part coinciding with a gliding descent afterwards. The sound is often described as that of a stick being pulled rapidly across the slats of a picket fence.

On the ground, male ptarmigans defend their space by calling and giving chase to other males. Physical conflicts between territorial males rarely occur, while confrontations between the former toward subordinate males are intensified. Other signals via fanning their tails, extended necks, lowered wings and circling a receptive female are also utilized.

== Distribution and habitat ==
The rock ptarmigan is a sedentary species which breeds across Arctic and Subarctic Eurasia and North America (including Greenland) on rocky mountainsides and tundra. It is widespread in the Arctic Cordillera and across the Eurasian Arctic from Norway, Sweden east to the Siberian Far East. It is also found in isolated populations in the mountains of Scotland, the Pyrenees, the Alps, Bulgaria, the Urals, the Pamir Mountains, the Altay Mountains, and Japan, where it occurs only in the Japanese Alps and on Mount Haku. Because of the remote habitat in which it lives, it has only a few predators, notably gyrfalcon, golden eagle, and arctic fox, and it can be surprisingly approachable.

The small population living on Franz Josef Land in the Russian High Arctic overwinters during the polar night and survives by feeding on rich vegetation on and underneath high cliffs where seabird colonies are located in summer.

In Great Britain, it occurred in England in the Lake District fells until the early 1800s, and slightly later in the Southern Uplands of Scotland, but is now absent from these regions, occurring now only in the Scottish Highlands. During the last ice age, the species was far more widespread in continental Europe.

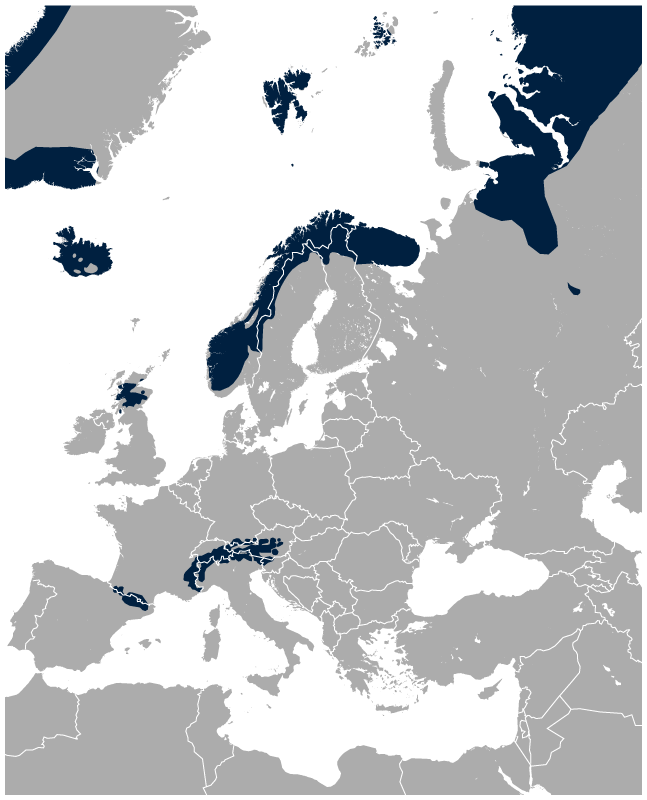
Distribution in Europe

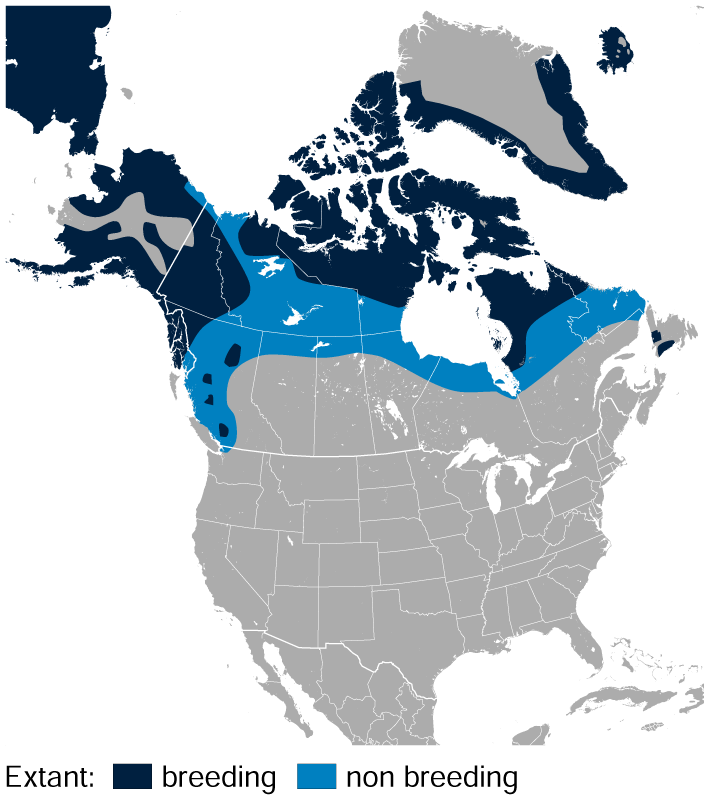
Distribution in North America

=== Migration ===
The species is largely sedentary, particularly in the more isolated southerly populations such as in Japan and Scotland, which show no more than limited altitudinal migration, moving to lower, more sheltered sites in winter. Further north, it is more dispersive, and in the Arctic, extensive movement occurs. Birds have been found in Iceland in winter with Greenland-origin minerals in their gizzards, having crossed the 300 km (190 mi) wide Denmark Strait, and a bird ringed in summer on Disko Island off the west coast of Greenland was recovered over 1,000 km (620 mi) further south in Qaqortoq the following winter.

=== Introductions ===
It has been introduced to New Zealand, South Georgia, the Kerguelen Islands, and the Crozet Islands. Attempted introductions to the Faroe Islands and Ireland failed.

== Ecology ==
=== Feeding ===
Food sources can vary tremendously depending on the region of their distribution. In Alaska, rock ptarmigans consume aspen buds, dwarf birch and willow buds and catkins as a staple winter diet. They transition their diets over to Empetrum nigrum (crowberries) and Vaccinium vitis-idaea (cowberry or lingonberry) shrubs during the spring. The greatest variety in its diet occurs during early summer, when it feeds on willow leaves, as well as the leaves and flowers of Dryas and locoweed. It also feeds on berries, bistort seeds, and birch buds from late summer to autumn. Insects, larvae and snails are eaten by chicks.

=== Breeding ===
Apart from the red eye combs, male rock ptarmigans have no 'distinct' plumage (other than the black eye stripe) that are more typical for other grouse in temperate regions. Studies on other grouses have shown that much variation in comb size and colour exists between the species, and that the comb is used in courtship display and aggressive interactions between males. Many studies have shown that there is a strong correlation between the comb size and the level of testosterone in males; one report from 1981 showed that the amount of testosterone is correlated to aggressiveness against other males.

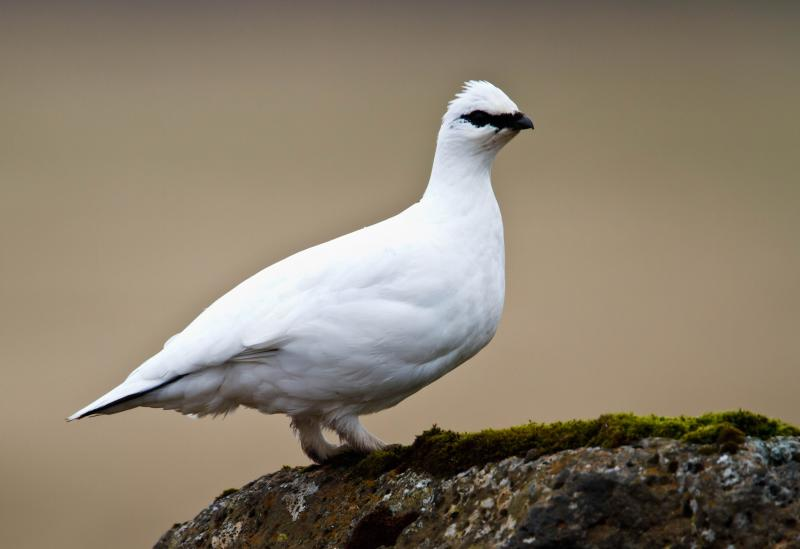
Male rock ptarmigan (L. m. islandorum) in winter plumage in Iceland

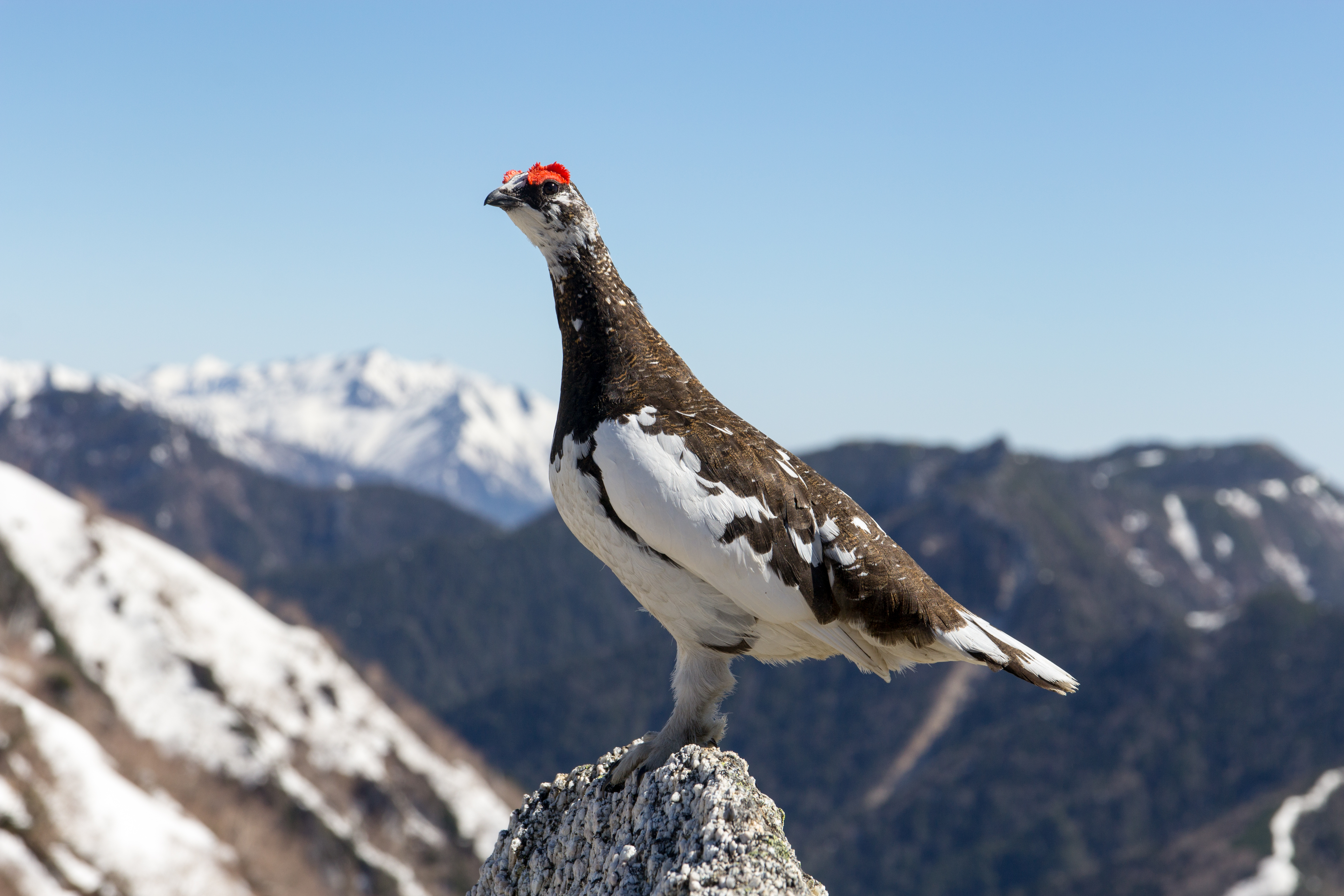
Male rock ptarmigan (L. m. japonicum) in summer plumage on Mount Tsubakuro, Japan

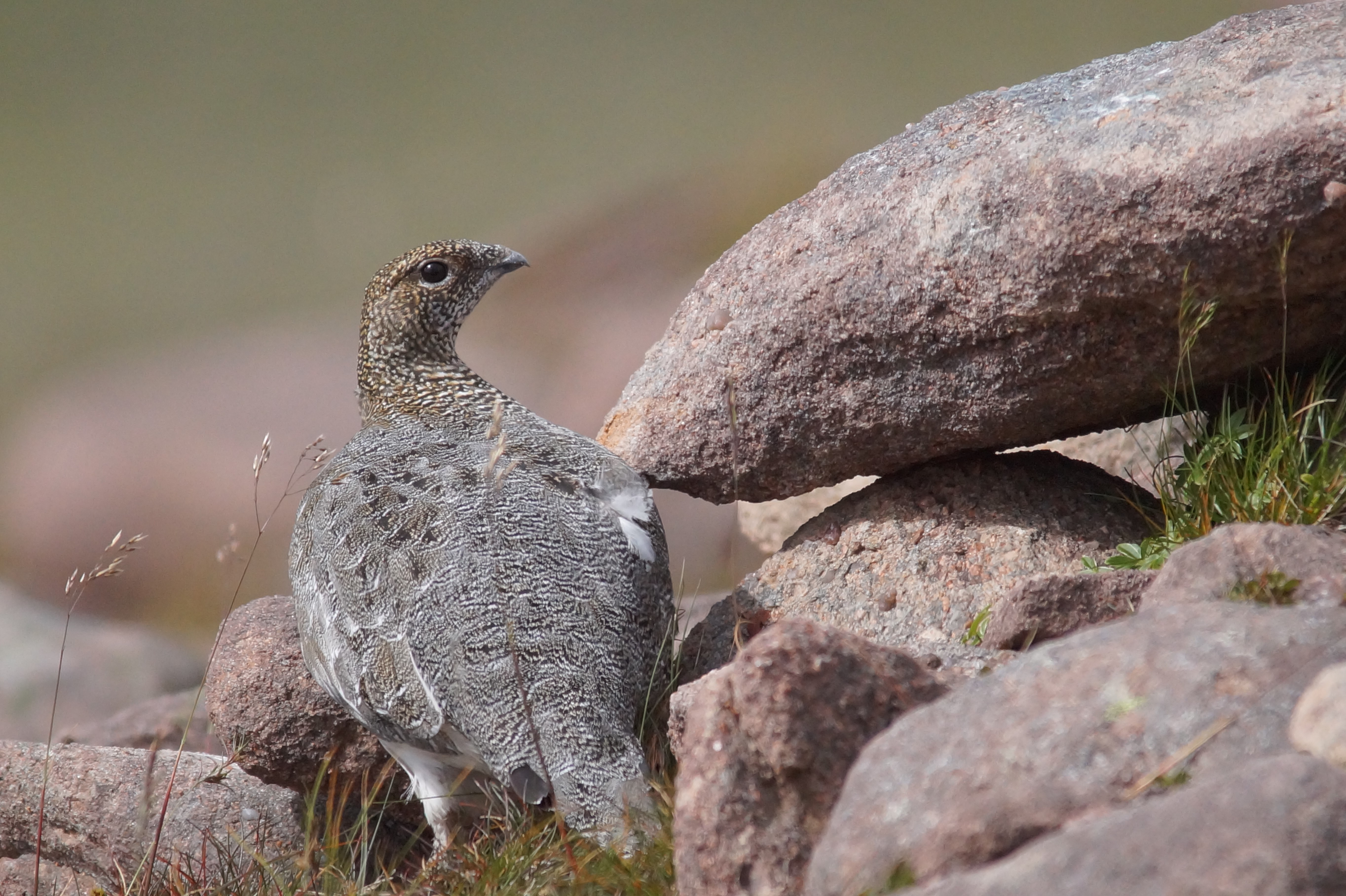
Female rock ptarmigan (L. m. millaisi) in summer plumage near Torridon, Scotland

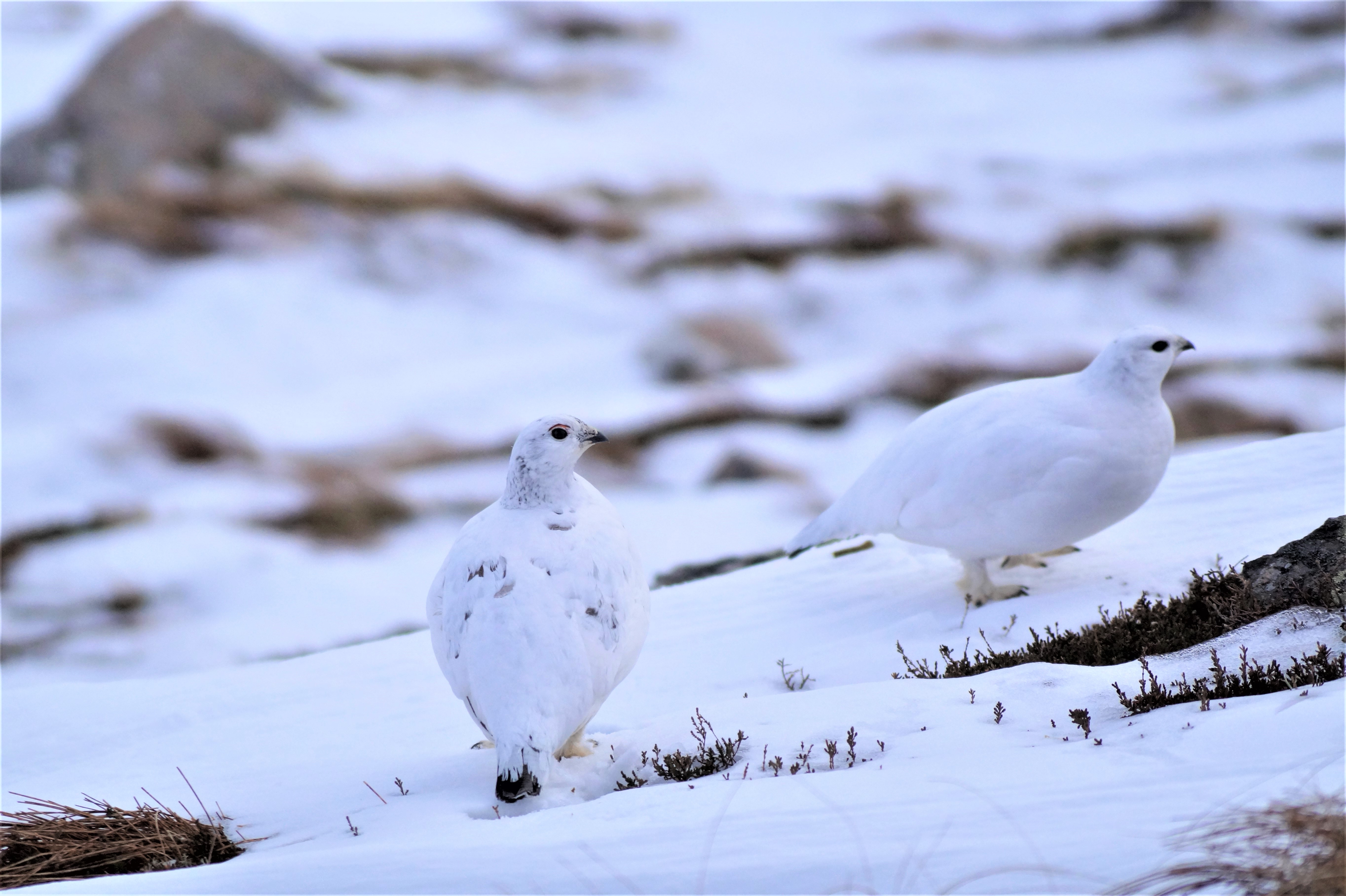
Rock ptarmigan (L. m. millaisi) pair (♂ left) in winter plumage near Glen Coe, Scotland

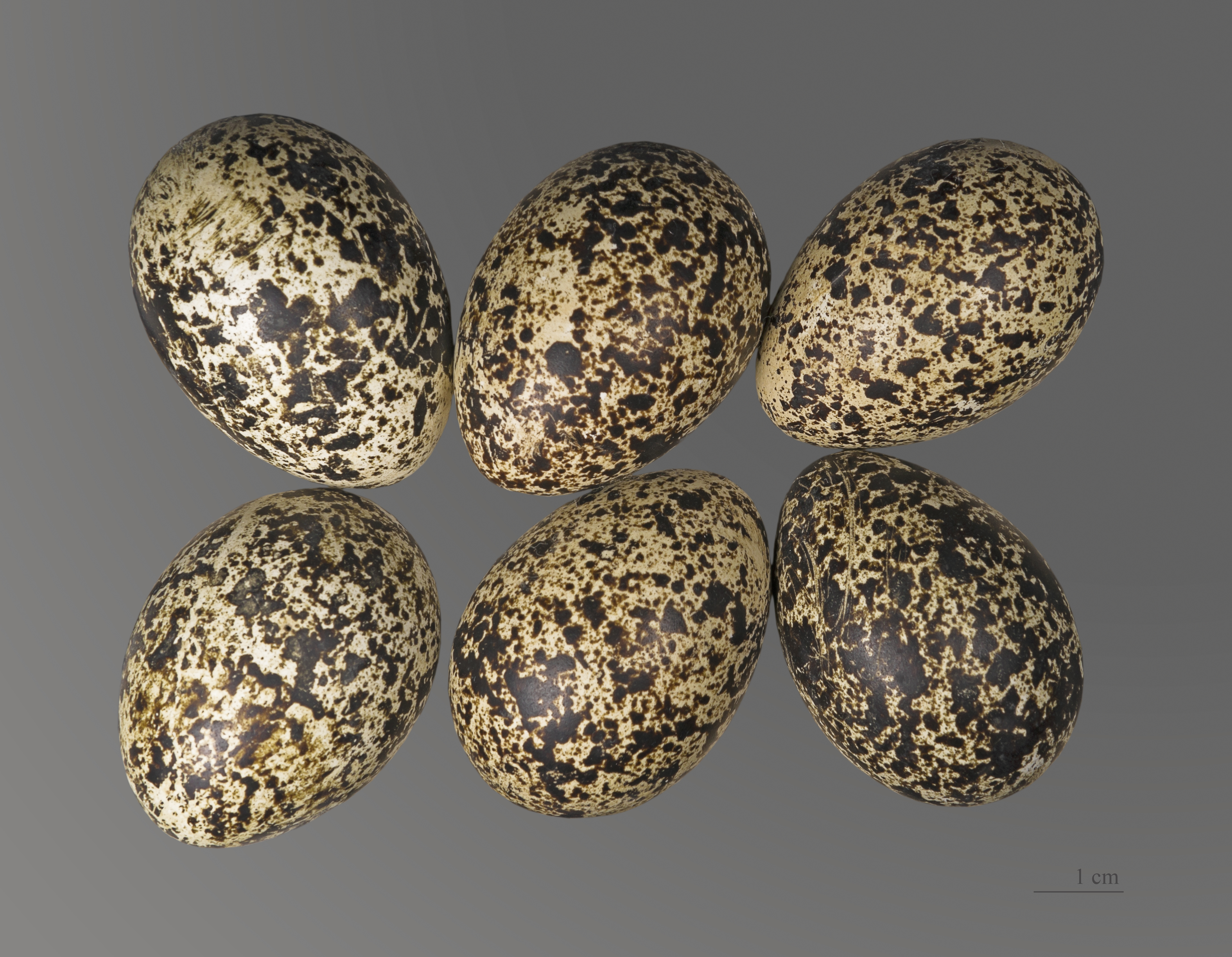
L. muta eggs

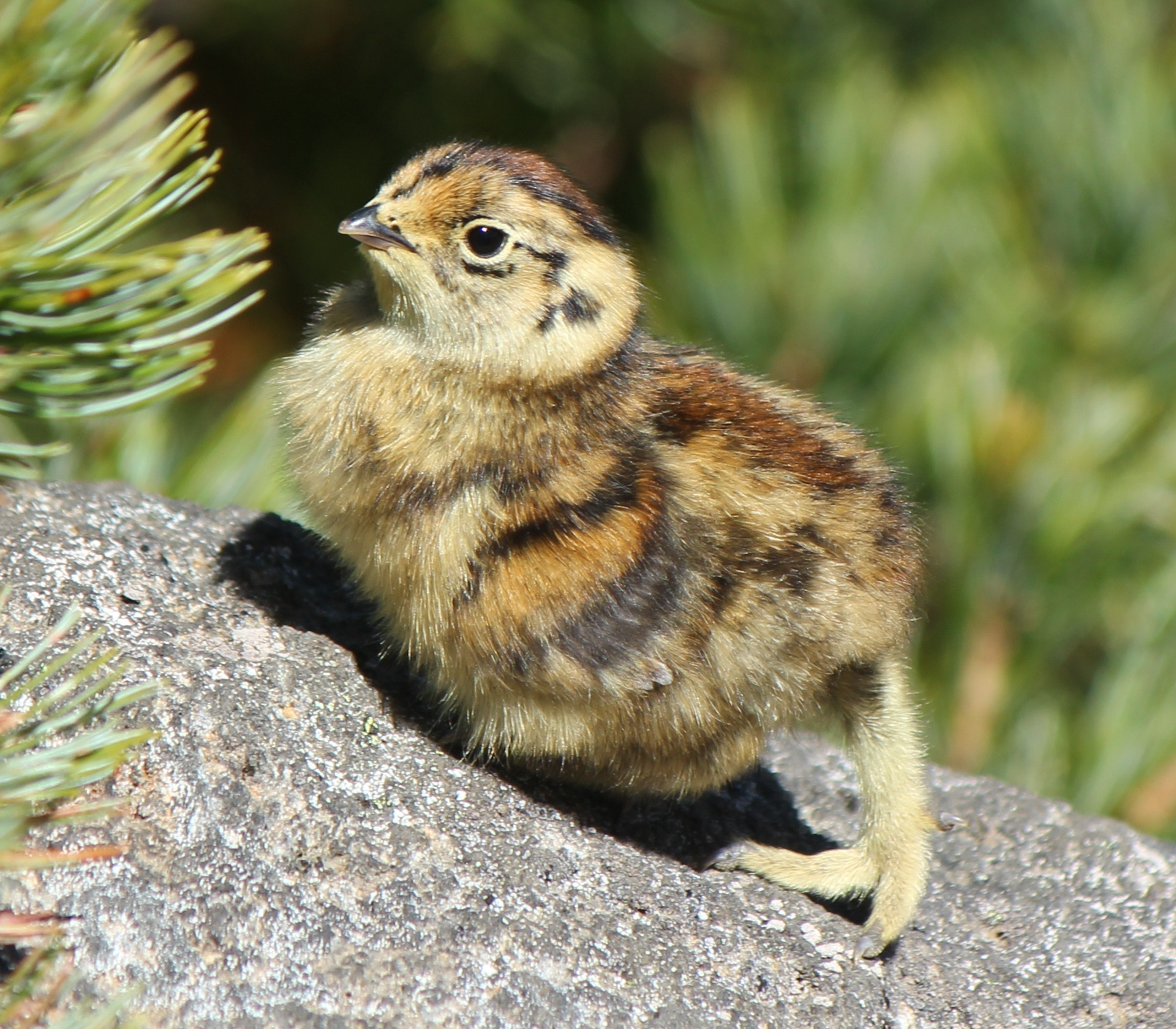
Japanese rock ptarmigan chick on Mount Ontake, Japan

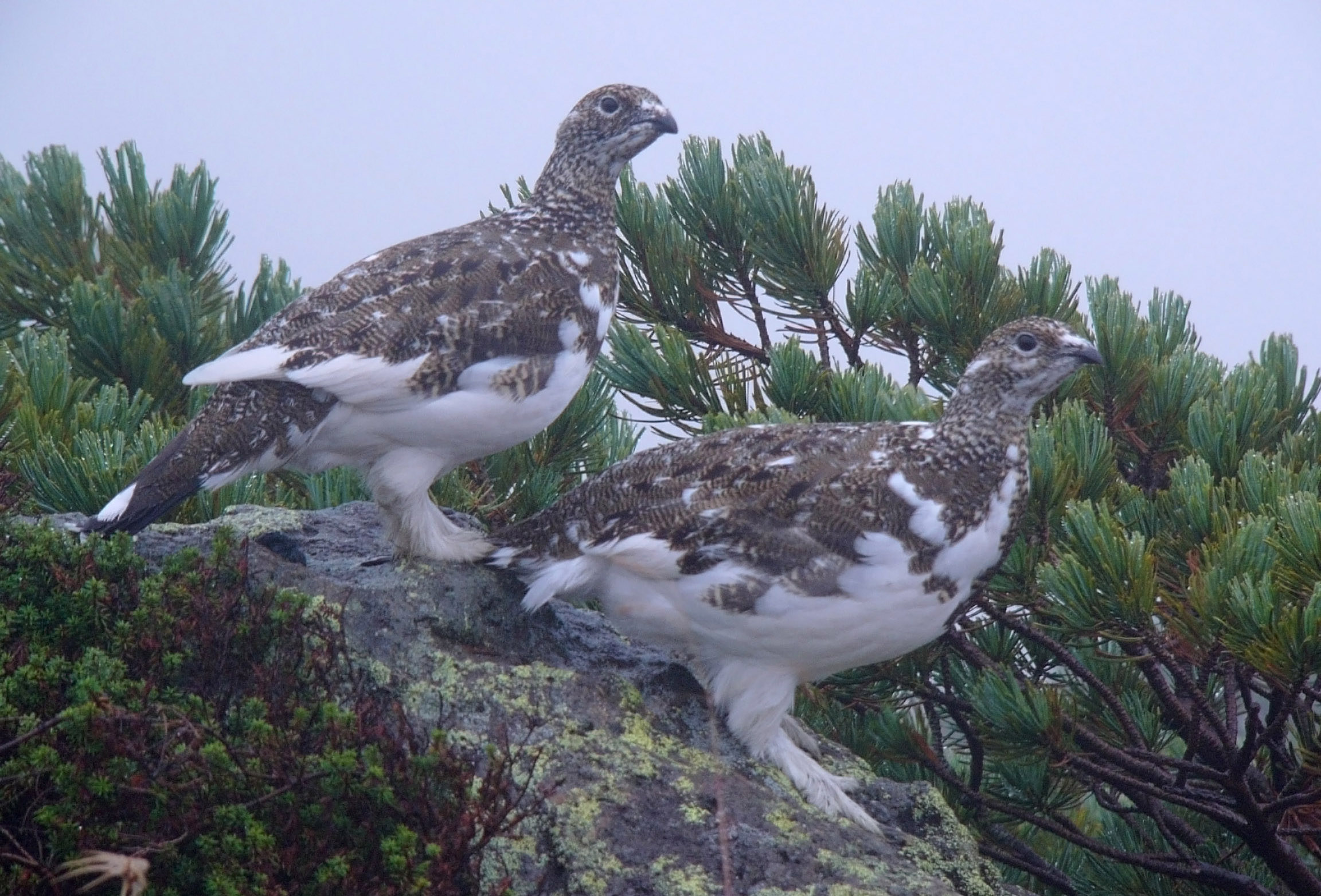
In the northern Japanese Alps

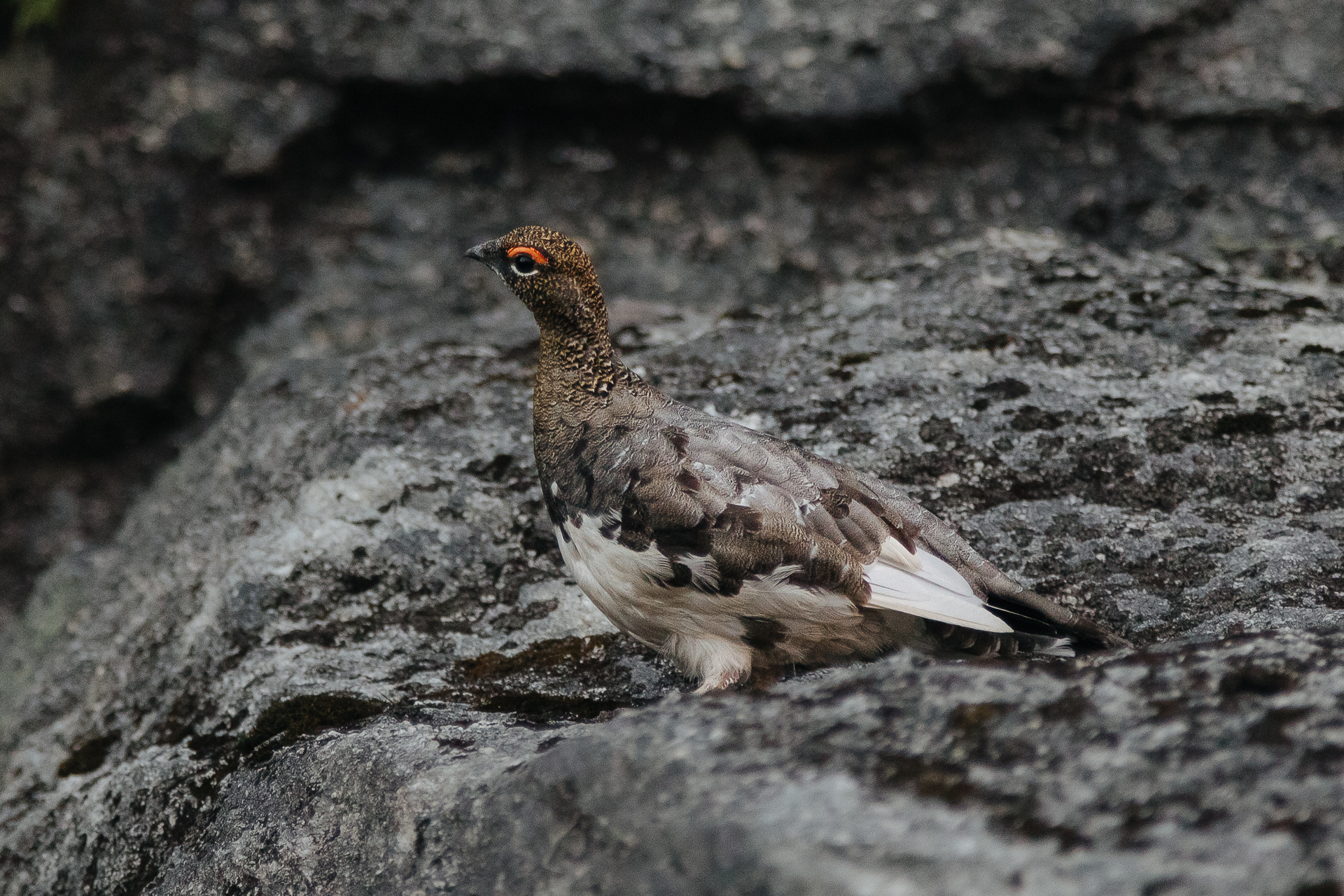
Female rock ptarmigan in summer plumage in Kvaløya, Norway

The male's comb has been the focus of studies regarding sexual selection. Studies of a population of male rock ptarmigans in Scarpa Lake, Nunavut, have shown that during the first year, mating success among males was influenced by comb size and condition, and bigamous males had larger combs than monogamous males. The correlation to size disappeared after the first year, but the correlation to comb condition remained. This is consistent with another study of the same population of L. muta that showed that mating success overall is correlated to comb condition. Exceptions were first-time breeders, in which the size of the comb influenced mating success.

The rock ptarmigan becomes sexually mature at six months of age and commonly has up to six chicks. Because of this high breeding rate, the size of the population is affected very little by factors such as hunting.

== Ecophysiology ==
=== Energy storage and assimilation ===
Rock ptarmigan have a limited capacity for fat storage, which requires overwintering birds to forage frequently. Most of the minuscule mass gained over winter is to the ovary, oviduct and hypertrophy, in preparation for the spring breeding season. Rock ptarmigan maximize assimilation of nutrient poor foods with their elongated ceca. Metabolic requirements can be partially supplemented by fermentation, the energy gain from fermentation alone, however, is not independently significant.

The Svalbard Norwegian subspecies of rock ptarmigan, is the only subspecies that exhibits a significant seasonal mass gain. Larger fat deposits can help them survive during periods of low food availability. However, this alone is not an adequate source of energy to survive during winter. Additional stored fat does not appear to increase the energetic cost in these birds' locomotion. This adaptation is key for a species that must move frequently to forage. Fat assimilation in these birds is correlated to changes in liver weight. Most rock ptarmigan have no more than 20 grams (0.71 oz) of adipose tissue year round. Without food, these reserves can supplement energy for 2 days. The Svalbard rock ptarmigan, however, gains about 100 grams (3.5 oz) of adipose tissue. This can serve as an energy source for up to 10 days of starvation.

The Svalbard subspecies inhabits the northern extent of the rock ptarmigans range. During winter, food availability is lower in Svalbard than in other parts of their range, which accounts for the necessary increased fat reserves not found in other sub populations.

== In culture ==
Rock ptarmigan meat is a popular part of festive meals in Icelandic cuisine. Hunting of rock ptarmigans was banned in Iceland in 2003 and 2004 due to its declining population. Hunting has been allowed again since 2005, but is restricted to selected days, which are revised yearly and all trade of rock ptarmigan is illegal.

In Thomas Bewick's A History of British Birds (1797) the species is named as "White Grouse" with alternatives "White Game, or Ptarmigan". The birds feed, records Bewick, "on the wild productions of the hills, which sometimes give the flesh a bitter, but not unpalatable taste: it is dark coloured, and has somewhat the flavour of the hare."

Heavy metal artist Sgaile's second album "Traverse the bealach" contains the song "The Ptarmigan's cry".

=== Provincial bird ===
The rock ptarmigan is the official territorial bird of Nunavut, Canada. Its Inuktitut name is ᐊᕐᑭᒡᒋᖅ ᐊᑕᔪᓕᒃ, aqiggiq atajulik. It is the official game bird of Newfoundland and Labrador.
