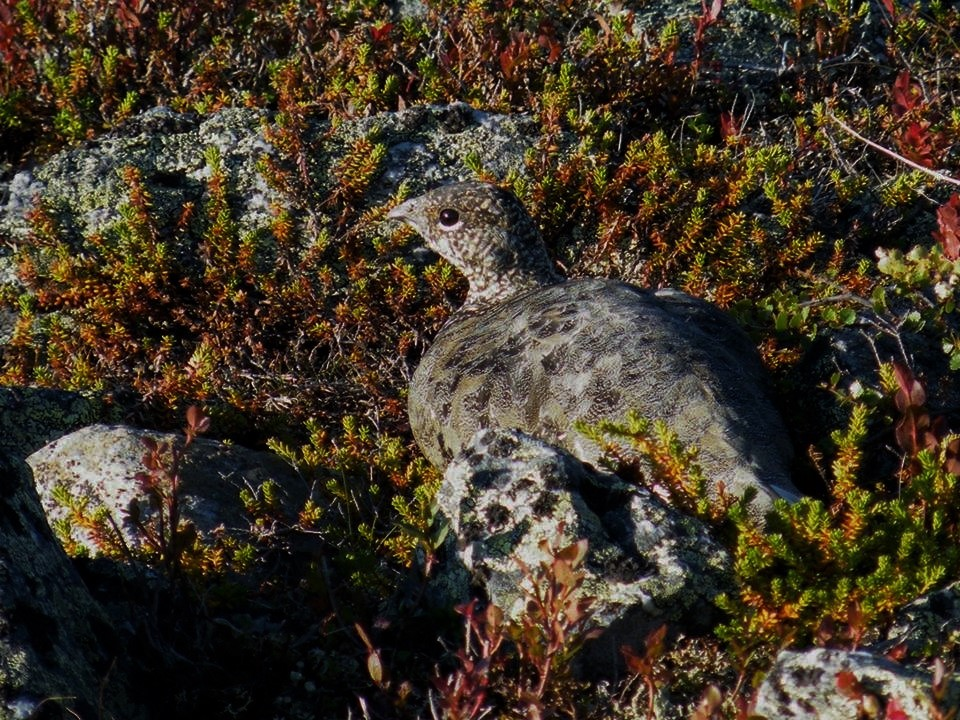

Scientific classification
- Kingdom: Animalia
- Phylum: Chordata
- Class: Aves
- Order: Galliformes
- Family: Phasianidae
- Tribe: Tetraonini
- Genus: Lagopus; Brisson, 1760

Type species
- Tetrao lagopus Linnaeus, 1758

Species
- See text

= Lagopus =

Lagopus Temporal range: Early Pliocene to present

Genus of birds

Lagopus is a genus of birds in the family Phasianidae, commonly known as ptarmigan (/ˈtɑːrmɪɡən/) or grouse. The genus contains four living species with numerous described subspecies, all living in tundra or cold upland areas.

== Taxonomy and etymology ==
The genus Lagopus was introduced by the French zoologist Mathurin Jacques Brisson in 1760 with the willow ptarmigan (Lagopus lagopus) as the type species. The genus name Lagopus is derived from Ancient Greek lagos (λαγος), meaning "hare, rabbit", + pous (πους), "foot", in reference to the feathered feet and toes typical of this cold-adapted group (such as in the snowshoe hare). The specific epithets muta and leucura were for a long time misspelt mutus and leucurus, in the erroneous belief that the ending of Lagopus denotes masculine gender. However, as the Ancient Greek term λαγωπους is of feminine gender, and the specific epithet has to agree with that, the feminine muta and leucura are correct.

The English name ptarmigan comes from the Scottish Gaelic name for L. muta, tarmachan (Scottish Gaelic pronunciation: ['t̪ʰaɾaməxan]), meaning “croaker”, which refers to the bird’s frog-like call. The p- was added due to a mistaken belief in a Greek origin, as if the word were related to the Greek word πτερόν (pterón), 'wing'.

== Description ==
The four species are all specialists of cold regions, mostly sedentary, though with extensive winter movements at higher latitudes. Willow ptarmigan is a circumpolar boreal forest species, white-tailed ptarmigan is a North American alpine bird, and rock ptarmigan breeds in both Arctic and mountain habitats across Eurasia and North America. The rock ptarmigan is one of the relatively few birds that has successfully adapted to live in Iceland all year round. With the exception of the red grouse (until recently considered a subspecies of willow ptarmigan), all have a white winter plumage that helps them blend into the snowy background; even their remiges are white.

These are hardy, largely vegetarian birds, but insects are also taken by the developing young. In all species except for the willow ptarmigan, the female takes all responsibility for nesting and caring for the chicks, as is typical with gamebirds.

== Species ==
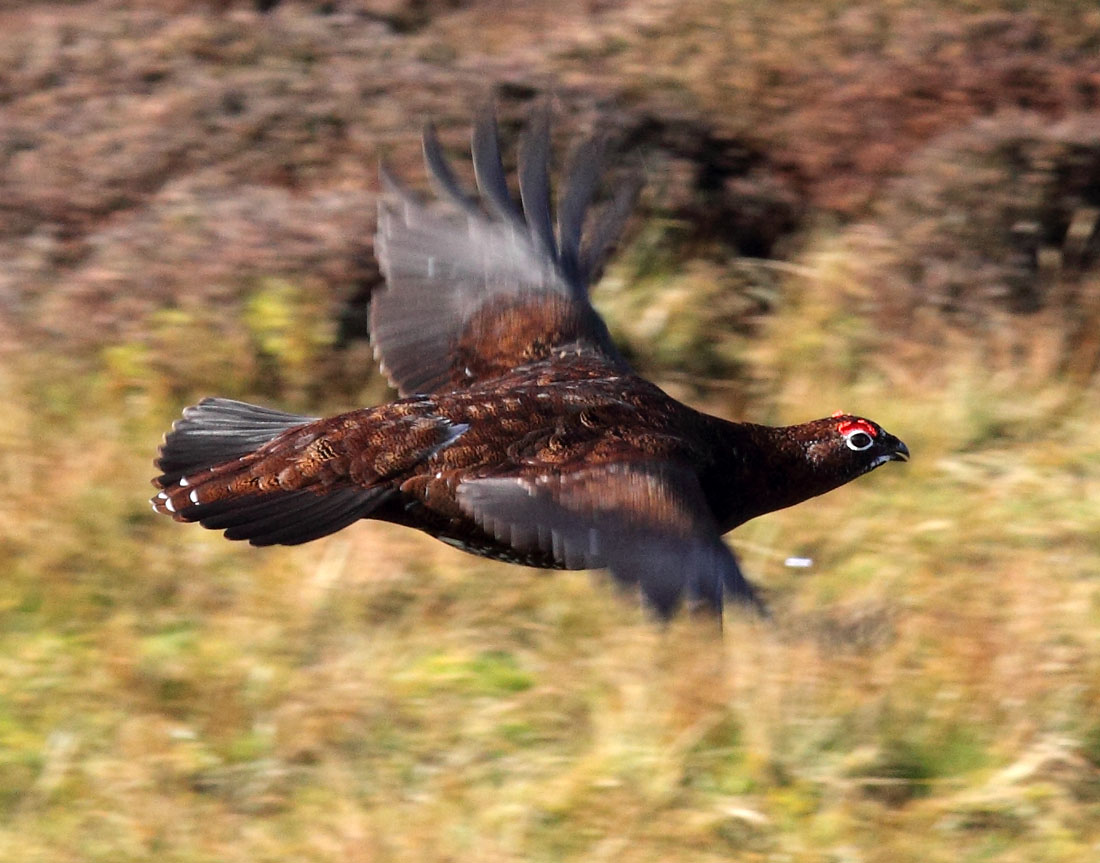
The red grouse (Lagopus scotica), native to the British Isles, was formerly considered as a subspecies of the willow ptarmigan

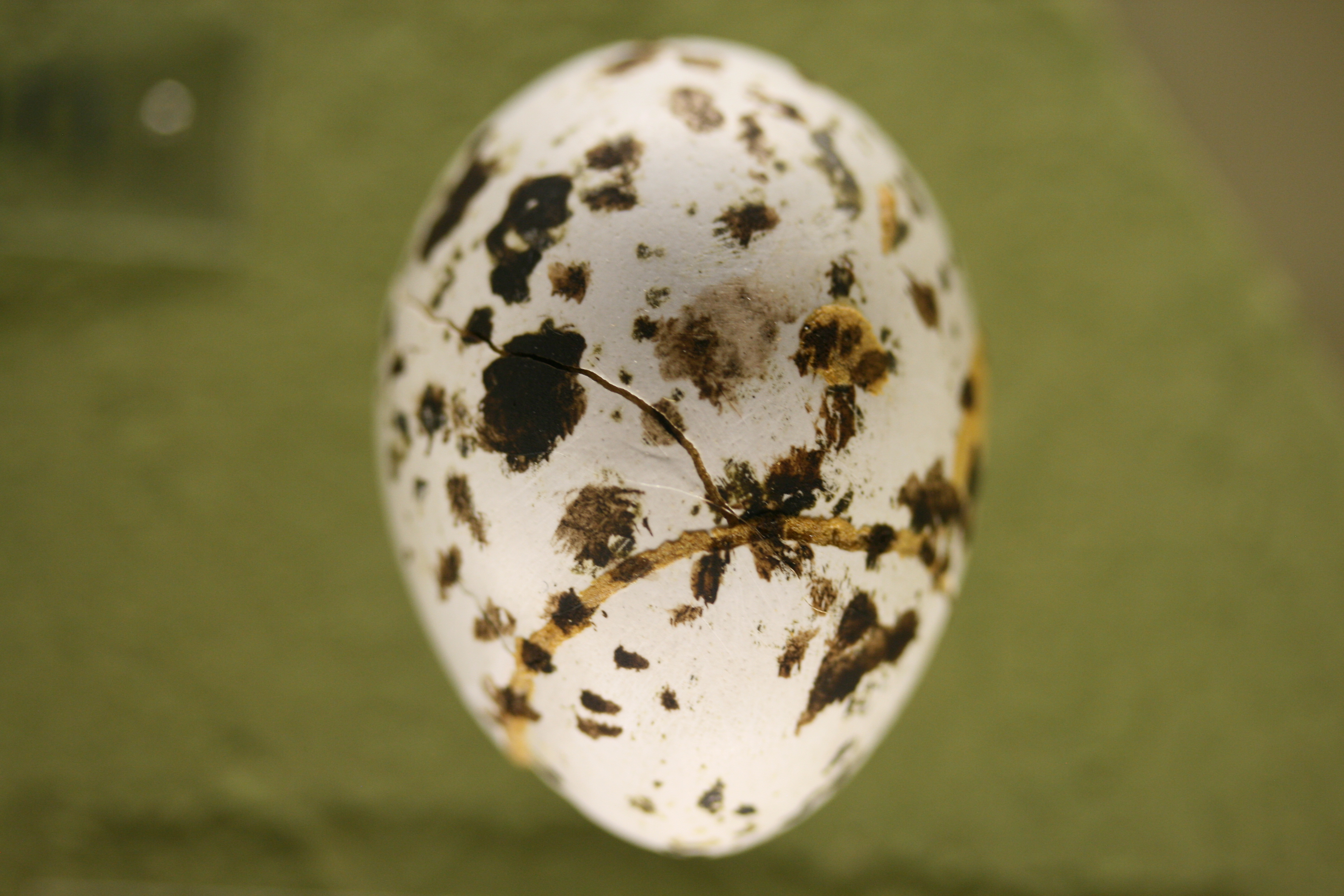
Egg of Lagopus muta

The genus contains four species:

Living species of Lagopus
Common and scientific names	Image	Description	Range and status
White-tailed ptarmigan Lagopus leucura (Richardson, 1831)	White-tailed ptarmigan	All year: bill small; no black on lores; tail and wings white; the smallest ptarmigan Summer: greyish-brown and speckled; tail and wings white Winter: white body plumage, including the tail; males identifiable by reddish eyecombs, and white lores	5 subspecies. Alpine areas above the timberline in North America from Alaska and western Canada to New Mexico. Status: Least Concern.
Rock ptarmigan Lagopus muta (Montin, 1781)	Rock ptarmigan	All year: bill small; male has black lores between bill and eye; wings white, tail black Summer: grey and brown upperparts Winter: white body plumage; outer tail feathers black	23 subspecies. Arctic and subarctic Eurasia and North America on rocky mountainsides and tundra; distinguished from willow ptarmigan by habitat, at higher altitudes and on more barren ground. Status: Least Concern.
Red grouse Lagopus scotica (Latham, 1787)	Red grouse	All year: bill stout; plumage reddish brown with black tail; only lower leg and foot feathers white; males redder than females	Monotypic. Great Britain and Ireland.
Willow ptarmigan (also willow grouse); Lagopus lagopus (Linnaeus, 1758)	Willow ptarmigan	All year: bill stout; wings white, tail black Summer: marbled brown and reddish with black tail and white underparts; males redder than females Winter: white body plumage; outer tail feathers black	15 subspecies. Circumarctic range in forest and moorlands of northern Eurasia and North America. Status: Least Concern.

=== Fossil record ===
Two prehistoric species and two paleosubspecies are only known from fossils:

- Lagopus atavus Jánossy, 1974 (Early Pliocene of Bulgaria? - Late Pliocene)
- Lagopus balcanicus Boev, 1995 (Late Pliocene of Varshets, Bulgaria)
- Lagopus lagopus noaillensis Mourer-Chauviré, 1975 (Pleistocene of W Europe)
- Lagopus muta correzensis Mourer-Chauviré, 1975 (Pleistocene of W Europe)
