= Pavel Serebrovsky =

Russian ornithologist and paleontologist (1888–1942)

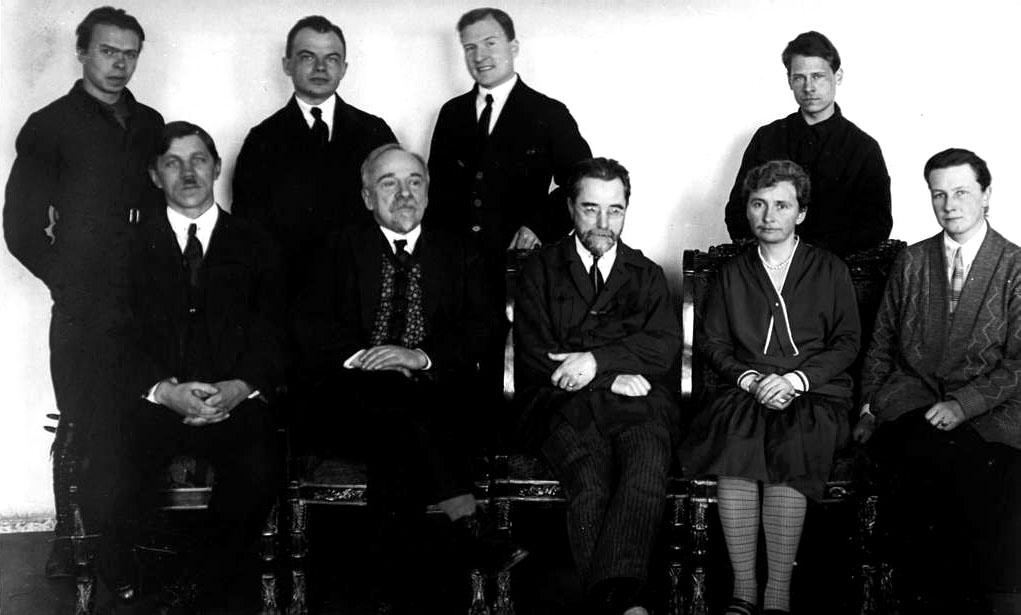
Serebrovsky (seated leftmost) with other Soviet ornithologists, 1924

Pavel Vladimirovich Serebrovsky (30 January 1888 – 5 February 1942) was a Russian ornithologist, biogeographer, and paleontologist. He worked on faunistics, biogeographical theories and worked at the zoological museum of the USSR Academy of Sciences while also collecting in the Altai and Caucasus regions. A couple of bird subspecies have been named after him. He died of starvation and cold during the Siege of Leningrad.

== Life and work ==
Pavel was the son of Vladimir Vasilievich Serebrovsky and Anna Feofanovna and was born in the village of Khudoshino, Nizhny Novgorod province. One of 13 siblings, his father worked in a church and then as a teacher while his mother took an interest in poetry. All the children sang in the church choir and one sibling Gleb became a talented bass singer. In 1905 Pavel apprenticed to a shoemaker and learned to repair shoes. He graduated from the gymnasium in 1907 and joined Moscow University but after the dismissal of M.A. Menzbier in 1911, all the students moved to Kharkov University and he graduated in 1915. He became involved in ornithological research and collected specimens from 1910 to 1911 in the Nizhny Novgorod region. In 1912 he joined Petr Sushkin's expedition into the Altai and in 1916 he went collecting in the Caucasus. He taught at the Kharkov gymnasium from 1916 to 1918 and married another teacher Maria Nikitchna Karetnikova. He became a faculty at the Kharkov University in 1917 under professor Sushkin. He served in Denikin's Volunteer Army and then returned in 1921. In 1924 he went to work in the museum in the Academy of Sciences at Leningrad on the invitation of Sushkin and after his death Serebrovsky headed the zoological institute for 12 years. A subspecies of the Willow ptarmigan Lagopus lagopus sserebrowsky was named after him by Janusz Domaniewski in 1933 a rock bunting Emberiza cia serebrowskii subspecies by Hans Johansen in 1944. Serebrovsky received a doctorate in 1939. In 1940 he was relieved from his position at the Zoological Institute of the USSR Academy of Sciences for reasons unknown but possibly related to the clergy class from which he came. In 1941 he worked on the identification of birds from bone fragments in the Binagadi deposits in Azerbaijan.

He died of starvation during the siege of Leningrad on 4 February 1942. The frozen body was picked up a team and buried in a mass grave.
