= Euura auritae =

Scientific classification
- Domain: Eukaryota
- Kingdom: Animalia
- Phylum: Arthropoda
- Class: Insecta
- Order: Hymenoptera
- Suborder: Symphyta
- Family: Tenthredinidae
- Genus: Euura
- Species: E. auritae

Binomial name
- Euura auritae Kopelke, 2000

Synonyms
- E. cinerae Kopelke, 1996; E. lapponica Kopelke, 1996

Species of sawfly

Euura auritae is a species of sawfly belonging to the family Tenthredinidae (common sawflies). The larvae forms galls on willows (Salix species). It was first described by Jens-Peter Kopelke in 2000. E. auritae is one of a number of closely related species which is known as the Euura atra subgroup.

== Description ==
The gall is an elongate swelling that tapers into the young shoot. It is 10 millimetres (0.39 in) to 15 millimetres (0.59 in) long by approximately 5 millimetres (0.20 in) wide. The bark around the gall is smooth and contains one larva which has three dorsal annulets on the third abdominal segment, and a suranal plate without pseudocerci. Pupation is probably in the gall.

In Britain the gall has been found on eared willow (Salix aurita). Elsewhere it has also been found on grey willow (S. cinerea), downy willow (S. lapponum) and (S. starkeana).

Other similar looking galls in the Euura atra subgroup are,

- E. atra found on white willow (S. alba) and crack willow (S. fragilis).
- E. salicispurpureae, found on purple willow (S. purpurea)
- E. myrtilloides found on swamp willow (Salix myrtilloides)
- E. weiffenbachiella, found on creeping willow (S. repens) and S. rosmarinifolia

== Distribution ==
Euura auritae has been recorded in central and northern Europe to Finland, Norway and Sweden. Also Czech Republic, Great Britain and the Netherlands.
