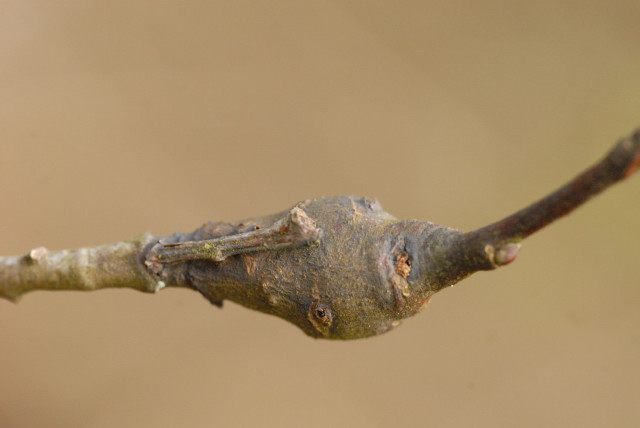
- Gall on willow

Scientific classification
- Domain: Eukaryota
- Kingdom: Animalia
- Phylum: Arthropoda
- Class: Insecta
- Order: Hymenoptera
- Suborder: Symphyta
- Family: Tenthredinidae
- Genus: Euura
- Species: E. atra

Binomial name
- Euura atra (Jurine, 1807)

Synonyms
- Pteronus atra Jurine, 1807; E. angusta (Hartig, 1937)

= Euura atra =

Species of sawfly

Euura atra is a species of sawfly belonging to the family Tenthredinidae (common sawflies). The larvae feed internally on the shoots of willows (Salix species) and do not usually form galls, although it is included in plant gall literature such as British Plant Galls. It was first described by Louis Jurine in 1807. E. atra is one of a number of closely related species known as the Euura atra subgroup.

== Description ==
The larvae do not usually form galls, making a tunnel as they feed within the shoot. When a gall is formed it can be a 10 millimetres (0.39 in) to 15 millimetres (0.59 in) long by approximately 5 millimetres (0.20 in), elongate swelling, that tapers into the stem. The bark around the gall is smooth and contains one larva which has three dorsal annulets on the third abdominal segment, and a suranal plate without pseudocerci. Pupation takes place within the shoot.

In Britain the gall is said to be widespread and has been found on white willow (Salix alba) and crack willow (S. fragilis). Elsewhere it has also been found on common osier (S. viminalis). In the past it was thought that similar looking galls on poplar (Populus species) was this species, but this is incorrect.

Similar looking species in the Euura atra subgroup are,

- E. auritae, found on eared willow (S. aurita)
- E. myrtilloides found on swamp willow (S. myrtilloides)
- E. salicispurpureae, found on purple willow (S. purpurea)
- E. weiffenbachiella, found on creeping willow (S. repens) and S. rosmarinifolia

== Distribution ==
Euura atra has been recorded in Finland, Germany, Great Britain (England and Scotland), Luxembourg and Sweden and may also be in Kyrgyzstan and Kazakhstan. Introduced to North America.
