= Euura myrtilloides =

Scientific classification
- Domain: Eukaryota
- Kingdom: Animalia
- Phylum: Arthropoda
- Class: Insecta
- Order: Hymenoptera
- Suborder: Symphyta
- Family: Tenthredinidae
- Genus: Euura
- Species: E. myrtilloides

Binomial name
- Euura myrtilloides Kopelke, 1996

Species of sawfly

Euura myrtilloides is a species of sawfly belonging to the family Tenthredinidae (common sawflies) and the larvae forms galls on swamp willow (Salix myrtilloides). It was first described by Jens-Peter Kopelke in 1996. E. myrtilloides is one of a number of closely related species which is known as the Euura atra subgroup.

== Description ==
The gall is often low down on the plant and is a conspicuous, elongated swelling on young branches. The larvae over-winter in the gall.

Other similar looking galls in the Euura atra subgroup are,

- E. atra, found on white willow (S. alba) and crack willow (S. fragilis)
- E. auritae, found on eared willow (S. aurita)
- E. salicispurpureae, found on purple willow (S. purpurea)
- E. weiffenbachiella, found on creeping willow (S. repens) and S. rosmarinifolia.

== Distribution ==
Recorded from Finland and Norway.
