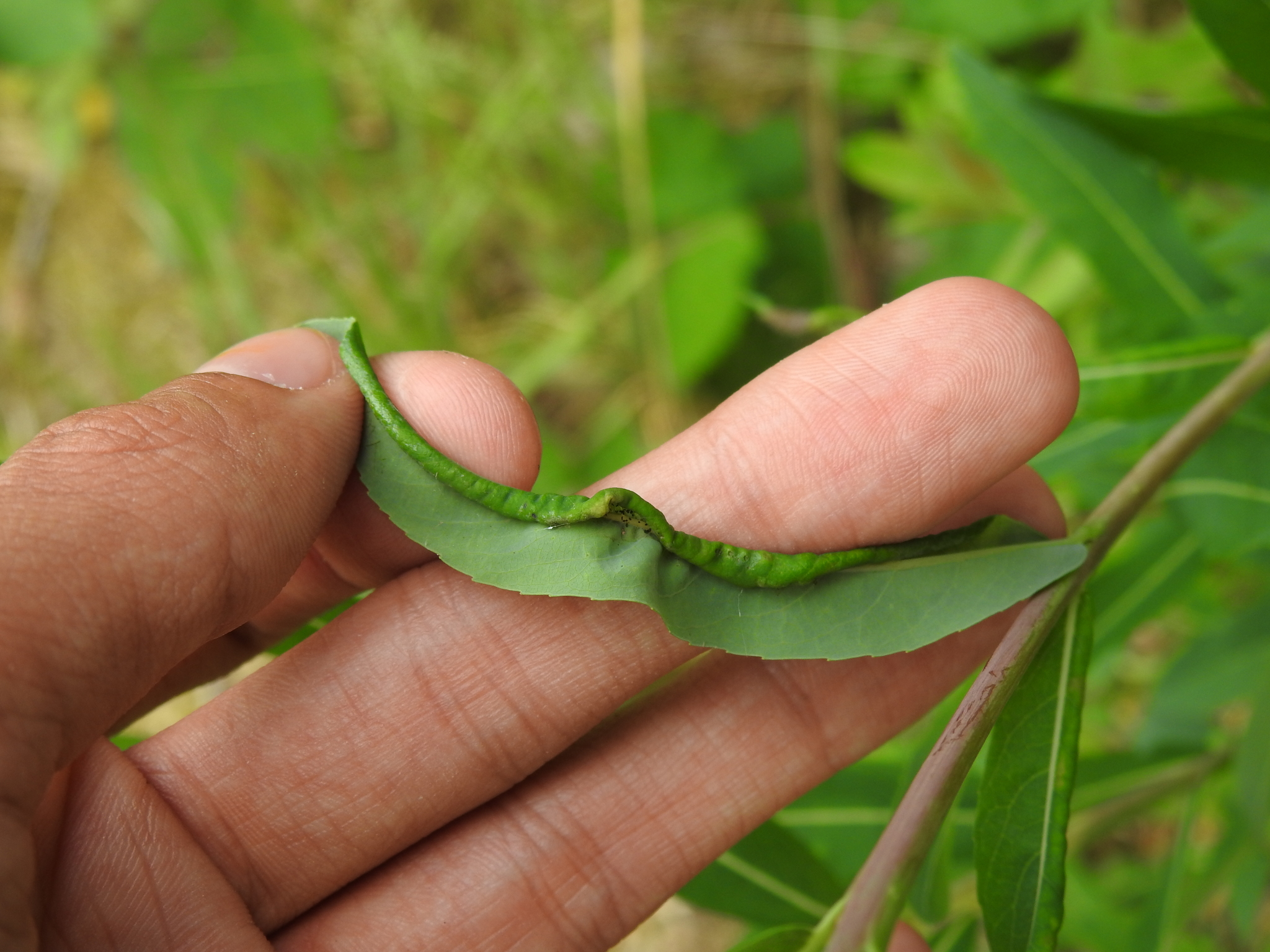
- Leaf gall caused by Euura salicispurpureae

Scientific classification
- Kingdom: Animalia
- Phylum: Arthropoda
- Class: Insecta
- Order: Hymenoptera
- Suborder: Symphyta
- Family: Tenthredinidae
- Genus: Euura
- Species: E. = salicispurpureae

Binomial name
- Euura = salicispurpureae Kopelke, 2014

Synonyms
- E. purpureae Kopelke, 1996

= Euura salicispurpureae =

Species of sawfly

Euura salicispurpureae is a species of sawfly belonging to the family Tenthredinidae (common sawflies). It was first described by Jens-Peter Kopelke in 1996 as Euura purpureae, but with the merging of several other sawfly genera into Euura in 2014, E. purpureae became preoccupied by the former Pontania purpureae, and Kopelke accordingly proposed the current name as a replacement. The larvae feed within galls on willows (Salix species). E. salicispurpureae is one of a number of closely related species known as the Euura atra subgroup.

== Description ==
The gall is a slight swelling of a young shoot and there can be several, 15 millimetres (0.59 in) long, smooth galls in row. The larva probably over-winter in the gall.

Galls have been recorded on S. purpurea, S. purpurea x silesiaca and S. purpurea x viminalis.

Other similar looking species in the Euura atra subgroup are,

- E. atra found on white willow (Salix alba) and crack willow (S. fragilis).
- E. auritae, found on eared willow (S. aurita)
- E. myrtilloides found on swamp willow (S. myrtilloides)
- E. weiffenbachiella, found on creeping willow (S. repens) and S. rosmarinifolia

== Distribution ==
Euura salicispurpureae has been recorded from north Africa, and south and central Europe, north to Denmark. According to Redfern et al. (2011), the gall has been recorded in Ireland as E. purpureae.
