= Euura weiffenbachiella =

Scientific classification
- Domain: Eukaryota
- Kingdom: Animalia
- Phylum: Arthropoda
- Class: Insecta
- Order: Hymenoptera
- Suborder: Symphyta
- Family: Tenthredinidae
- Genus: Euura
- Species: E. weiffenbachiella

Binomial name
- Euura weiffenbachiella Liston & Vikberg, 2017

Synonyms
- E. weiffenbachii Ermolenko, 1988 nec (Lindqvist, 1958).

Species of sawfly

Euura weiffenbachiella is a species of sawfly belonging to the family Tenthredinidae (common sawflies). The larvae forms galls on creeping willows (Salix repens). E. weiffenbachiella is one of a number of closely related species which is known as the Euura atra subgroup.

== Description ==
The shape of the gall is variable, probably depending on where the egg is laid;

- it can develop on one side of the shoot, causing it to bend and look similar to a miniature gall of E. amerinae, or
- it can be spindle-shaped with the shoot remaining straight measuring 10 millimetres (0.39 in) to 15 millimetres (0.59 in) long by approximately 5 millimetres (0.20 in) wide.

Found on creeping willow (S. repens) and S. rosmarinifolia.

Other similar looking species in the Euura atra subgroup are,

- E. atra found on white willow (Salix alba) and crack willow (S. fragilis).
- E. auritae found on eared willow (S. aurita)
- E. myrtilloides found on swamp willow (Salix myrtilloides)
- E. salicispurpureae found on purple willow (S. purpurea)

== Distribution ==
Liston et al. records the sawfly from central and northern Europe, and east to Yakutia. Redfern et al. records the gall from Great Britain (Scotland) and Ireland.
