= Salix fragilis =

Salix fragilis is a scientific name that has historically been used for two different willows:

- Salix euxina, a non-hybrid species
- Salix × fragilis, the hybrid between Salix euxina and Salix alba
