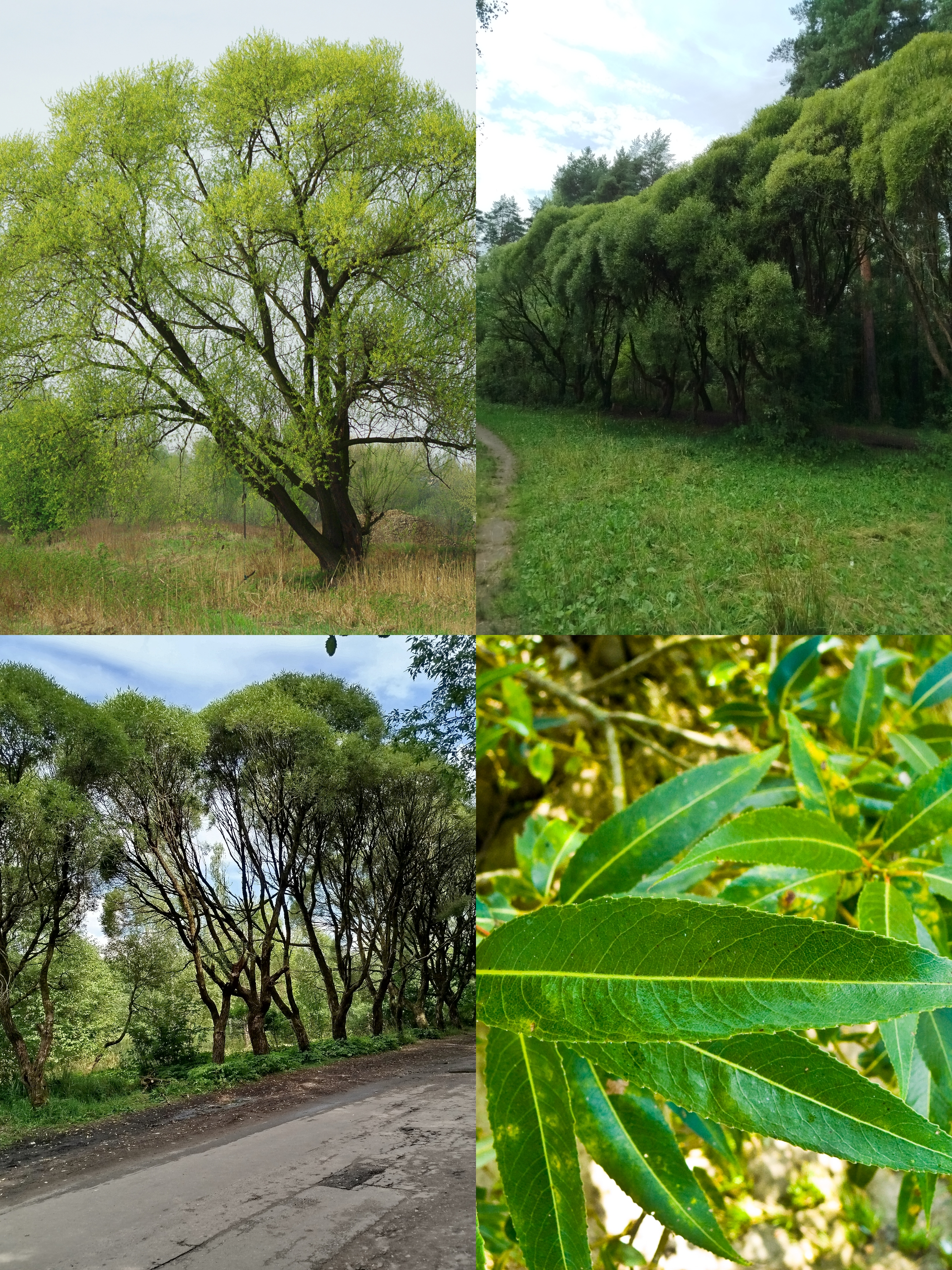

Scientific classification
- Kingdom: Plantae
- Clade: Tracheophytes
- Clade: Angiosperms
- Clade: Eudicots
- Clade: Rosids
- Order: Malpighiales
- Family: Salicaceae
- Genus: Salix
- Species: S. × fragilis

Binomial name
- Salix × fragilis L.

Synonyms
- Oisodix × decipiens Raf.; Psatherips × fragilis (L.) Raf.; Salix alba var. elyensis Burtt Davy; Salix × chlorocarpa Schur; Salix × decipiens Hoffm.; Salix × excelsa Tausch ex W.D.J.Koch; Salix × excelsior Host; Salix × fragilior Host; Salix × fragilissima Host; Salix × fragillima Schur; Salix × gracilenta Tausch; Salix × lyonii J.Forbes; Salix × monspeliensis J.Forbes; Salix × montana J.Forbes; Salix × neotricha Goerz; Salix × palustris Host; Salix × pendula Ser.; Salix × persicifolia Schleich.; Salix × rubens Schrank; Salix × russelliana Sm.; Salix × sanguinea Tausch ex Opiz; Salix × viridis Fr.; Salix × wargiana Lej.; Vimen × russeliana (Sm.) Raf.

= Salix × fragilis =

Species of tree

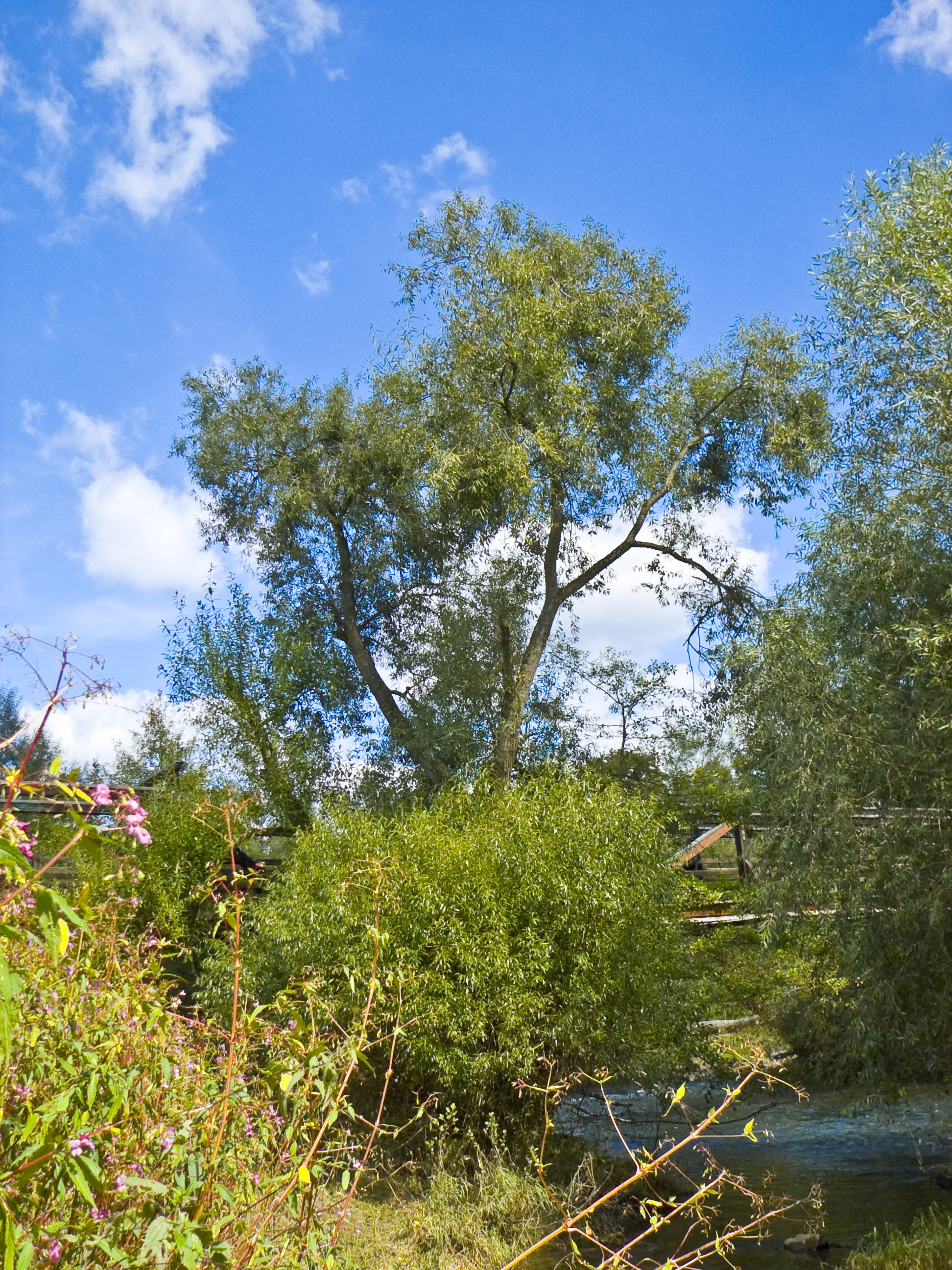
In riparian habitat, Hesse, Germany

Salix × fragilis, with the common names crack willow and brittle willow, is a hybrid species of willow native to Europe and Western Asia. It is native to riparian habitats, usually found growing beside rivers and streams, and in marshes and water meadow channels. It is a hybrid between Salix euxina and Salix alba, and is very variable, with forms linking both parents.

== Description ==
Salix × fragilis is a medium-sized to large deciduous tree, which grows rapidly to 10–20 m (33–66 ft) (rarely to 29 m (95 ft)) tall, with a trunk up to 1 m (3.3 ft) diameter, often multi-trunked, and an irregular, often leaning crown. The bark is dark grey-brown, coarsely fissured in older trees. The lanceolate leaves are bright green, 9–15 cm long and 1.5–3 cm wide, with a finely serrated margin; they are very finely hairy at first in spring, but soon become hairless.

The flowers are produced in catkins in early spring and are pollinated by insects. They are dioecious, with male and female catkins on separate trees. The male catkins are 4–6 cm long, the female catkins are the same length. The individual flowers have either one or two nectaries. In late spring, the fruit capsules release numerous small cotton-tufted seeds. These are easily distributed by wind and moving water and germinate immediately upon contact with the soil.

== Taxonomy ==
Carl Linnaeus first described a willow species as "Salix fragilis" in 1753. It was later discovered that he was actually describing a species that he had also called Salix pentandra. Since at least the 1920s, botanists have applied Linnaeus's name "Salix fragilis" to both a pure species and to its hybrid with Salix alba. In 2005, it was proposed that "Salix fragilis" should be conserved for the pure species, with the hybrid called "Salix × rubens". The alternative was to conserve "Salix fragilis" for the hybrid, with the pure species requiring a new name. Following a discussion, the Nomenclature Committee for Vascular Plants rejected the initial proposal in 2009 and opted to conserve the name "Salix fragilis" for the hybrid. Irina V. Belyaeva subsequently described the previously unnamed parent species as Salix euxina, and designated a lectotype for the hybrid. The lectotype was shown by molecular evidence to be the hybrid between S. alba and S. euxina, the name of which is written as Salix × fragilis to show its hybrid status.

=== Varieties ===
S. × fragilis is very variable, with forms linking both parents. Some formally named varieties include the following. As of August 2021, none were accepted at this rank by Plants of the World Online, being treated as synonyms of the species. Clive A. Stace suggested some would be better treated as cultivars.

- S. × fragilis var. decipiens W.D.J.Koch (S. × decipiens Hoffm.) – assigned to S. × fragilis by Plants of the World Online and by Belyaeva, but to S. euxina by Stace
- S. × fragilis var. furcata Ser. ex Gaudin – male tree with relatively wide leaves; of cultivated origin
- S. × fragilis var. fragilis – male and female trees known; leaves with even, well spaced teeth
- S. × fragilis var. glauca Spenn.
- S. × fragilis var. polyandra Wimm.
- S. × fragilis var. rubens (Schrank) P.D.Sell
- S. × fragilis var. russelliana (Sm.) W.D.J.Koch – Bedford willow; female tree with long narrow leaves having somewhat uneven teeth; of cultivated origin

== Ecology ==
The plant is commonly called crack willow or brittle willow because it is highly susceptible to damage from wind, ice and snow. The name also derives from the twigs, which break off very easily and cleanly at the base with an audible crack. Broken twigs and branches can readily take root, enabling the species to colonise new areas when they fall into waterways and are carried some distance downstream. The plant is particularly adept at colonising new riverside sandbanks formed after floods. It also spreads by root suckers, forming pure 'groves'.

== Cultivation and uses ==
Salix × fragilis is cultivated as a fast-growing ornamental tree. The cultivar 'Russelliana' (syn. S. × fragilis var. russelliana) is by far the most common clone of crack willow in Great Britain and Ireland, very easily propagated by cuttings. It is a vigorous tree commonly reaching 20–25 m (66–82 ft) tall, with leaves up to 15 cm long. It is a female clone.

== Invasive species ==
Salix × fragilis has escaped cultivation to become an invasive species in various parts of the world, including: all states and territories in Australia, New Zealand; the upper half of the United States;, South Africa and Brazil. In New Zealand it is listed on the National Pest Plant Accord, which means it cannot be sold or distributed. It can replace a habitat's native plant species diversity by forming monospecific stands. As only the male plant is present in New Zealand no fruit is formed unless hybridised. Species spread is facilitated by stem fragmentation which are carried via waterways and nearby adult individuals. Control and management for habitat restoration projects often uses herbicides.

== Gallery ==
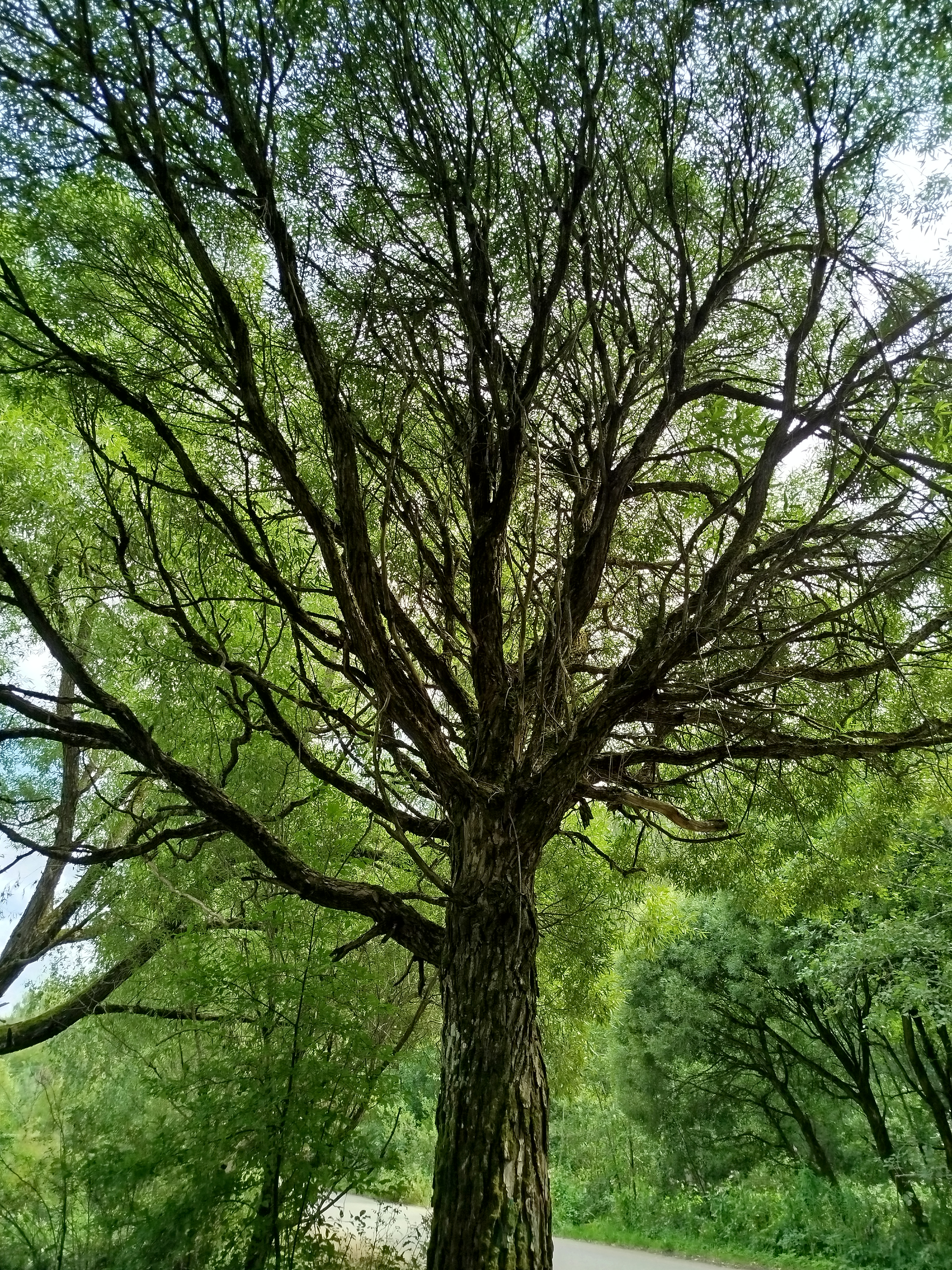

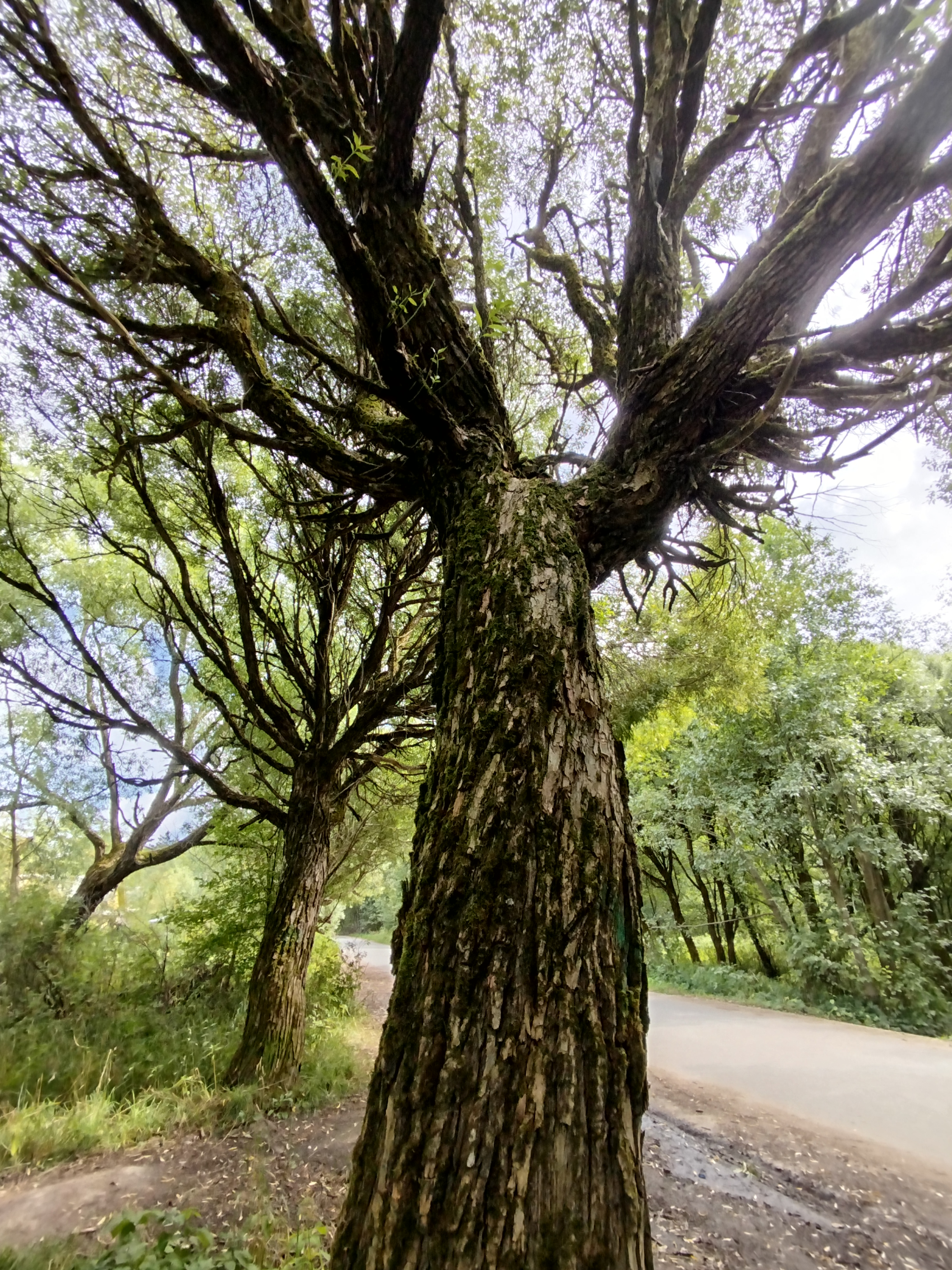

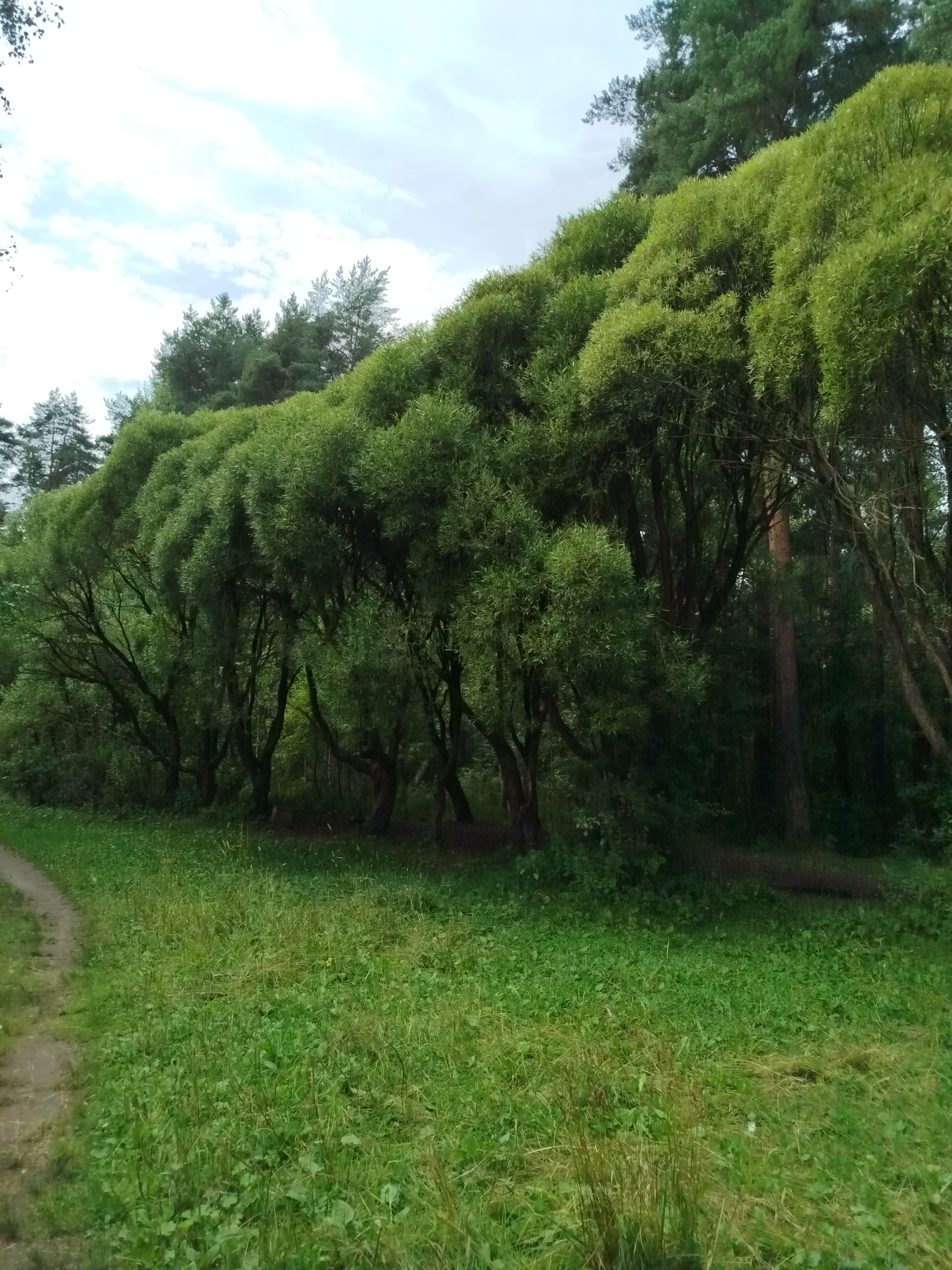

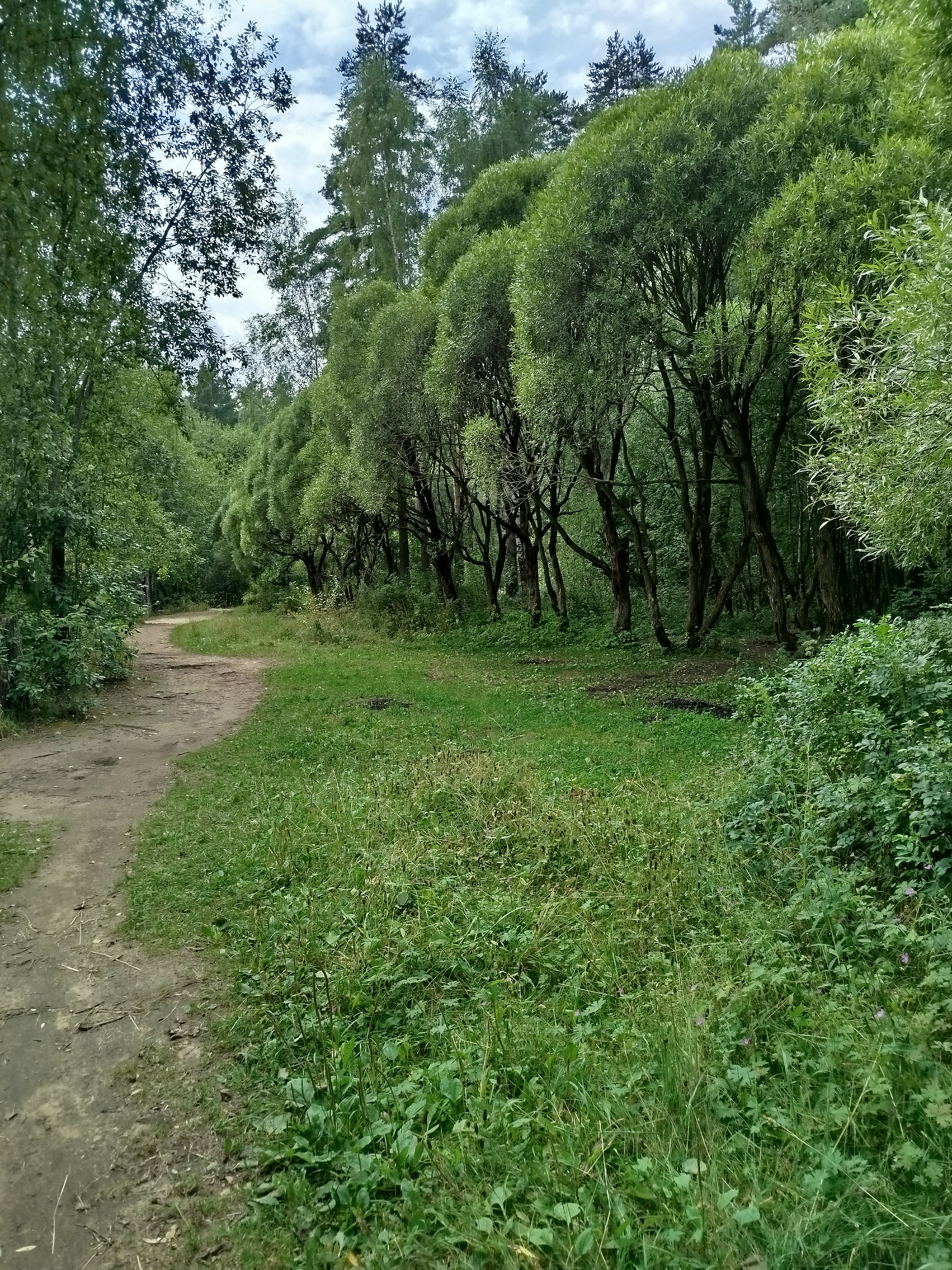

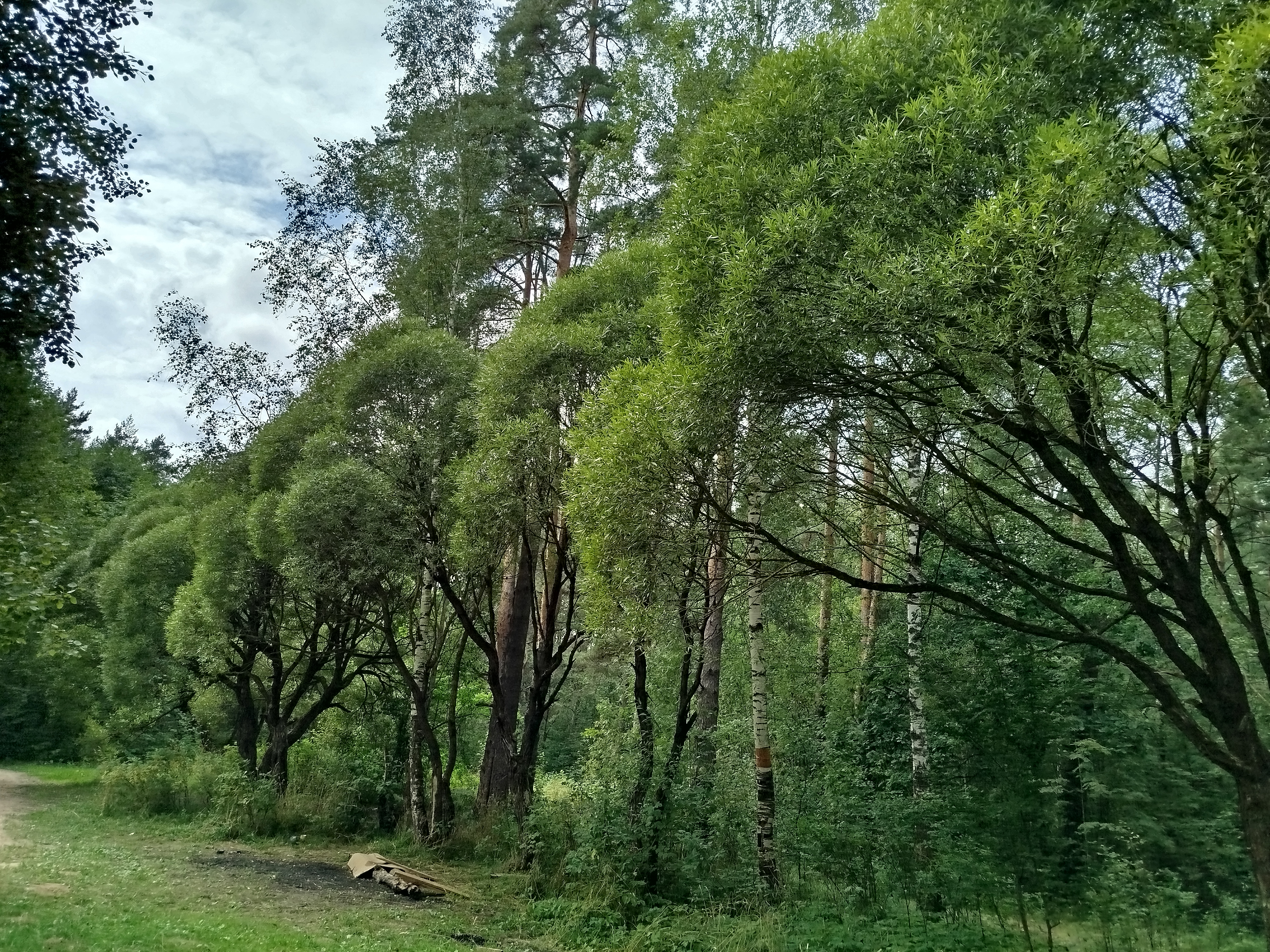

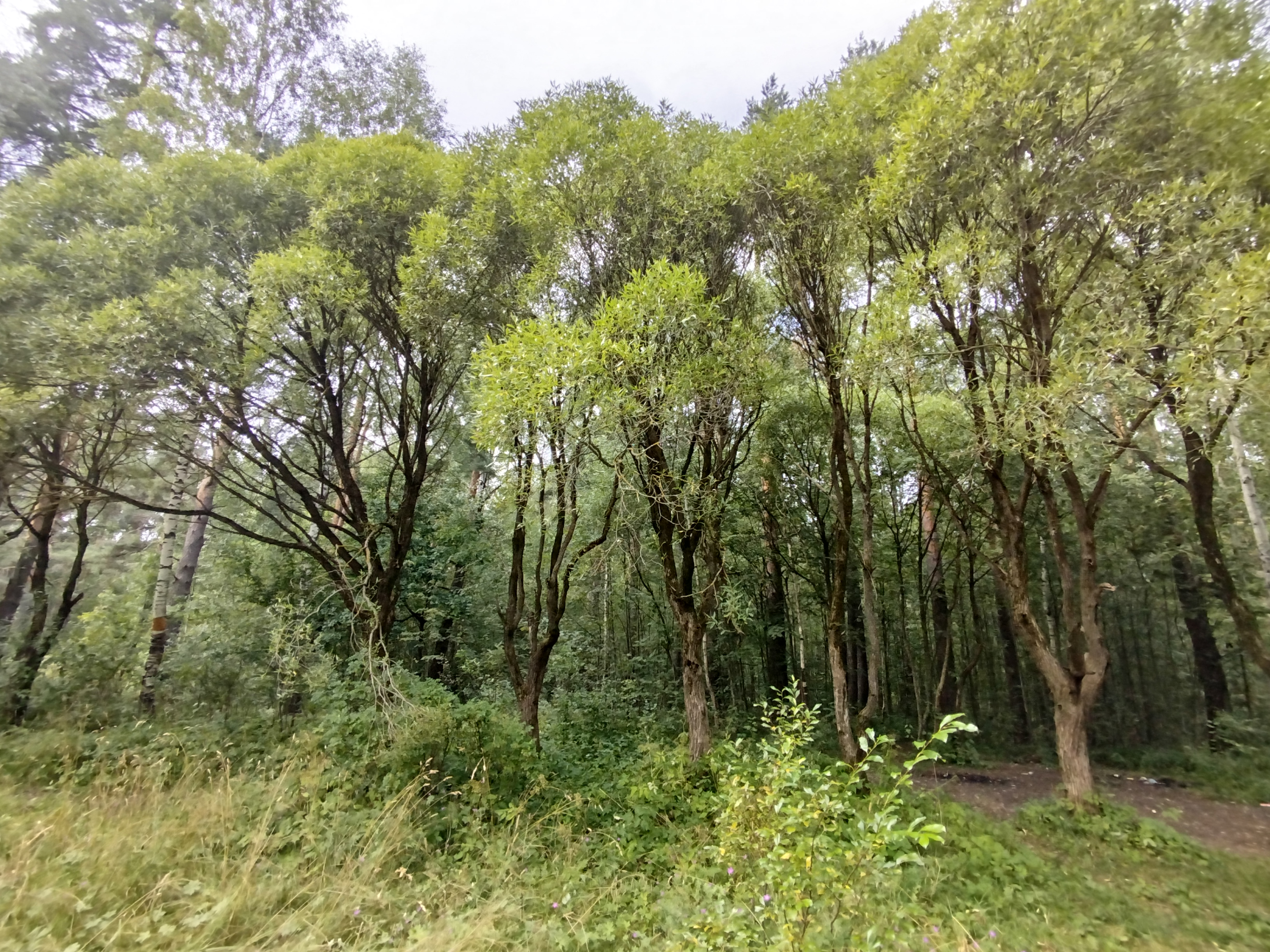

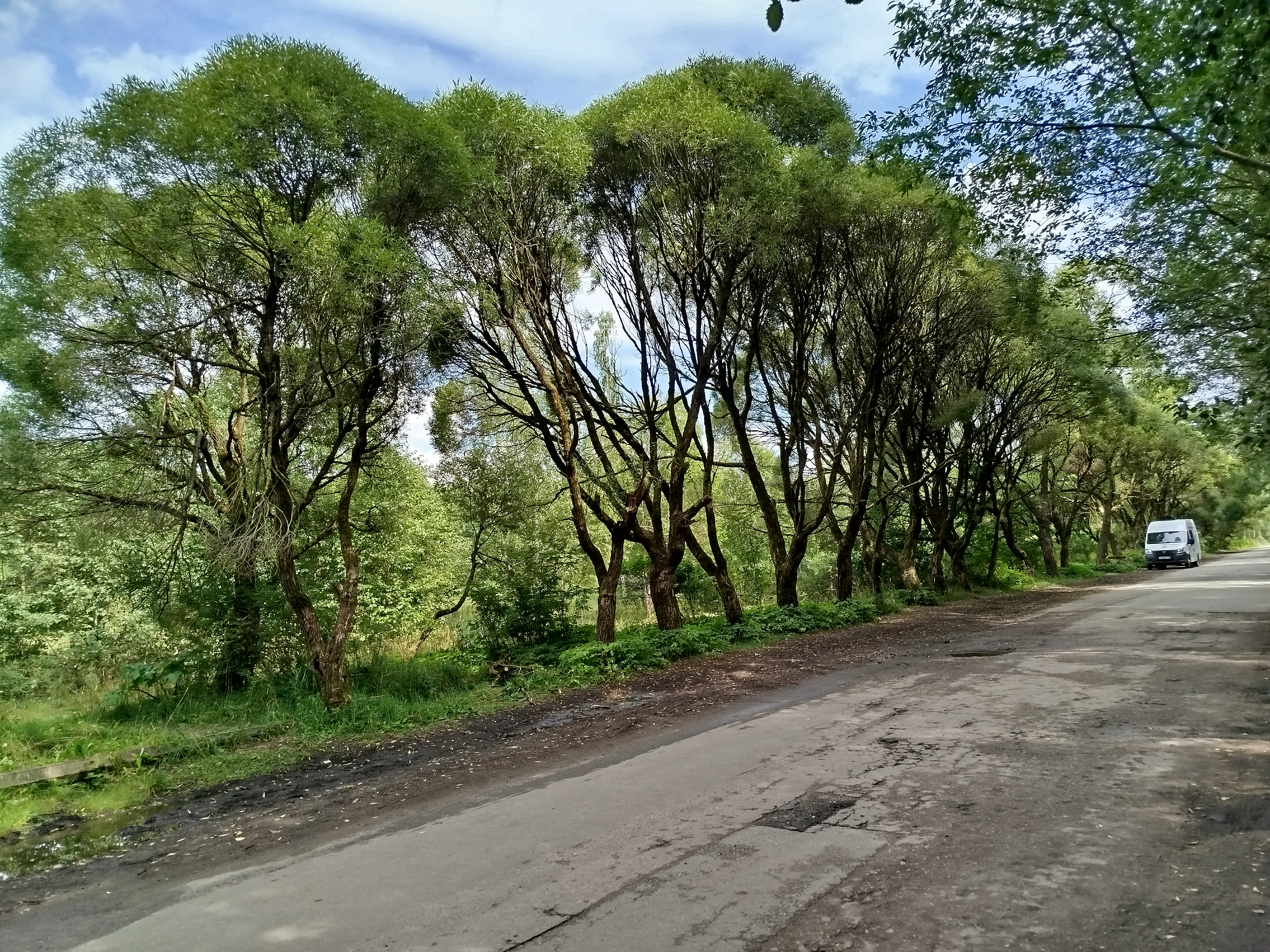

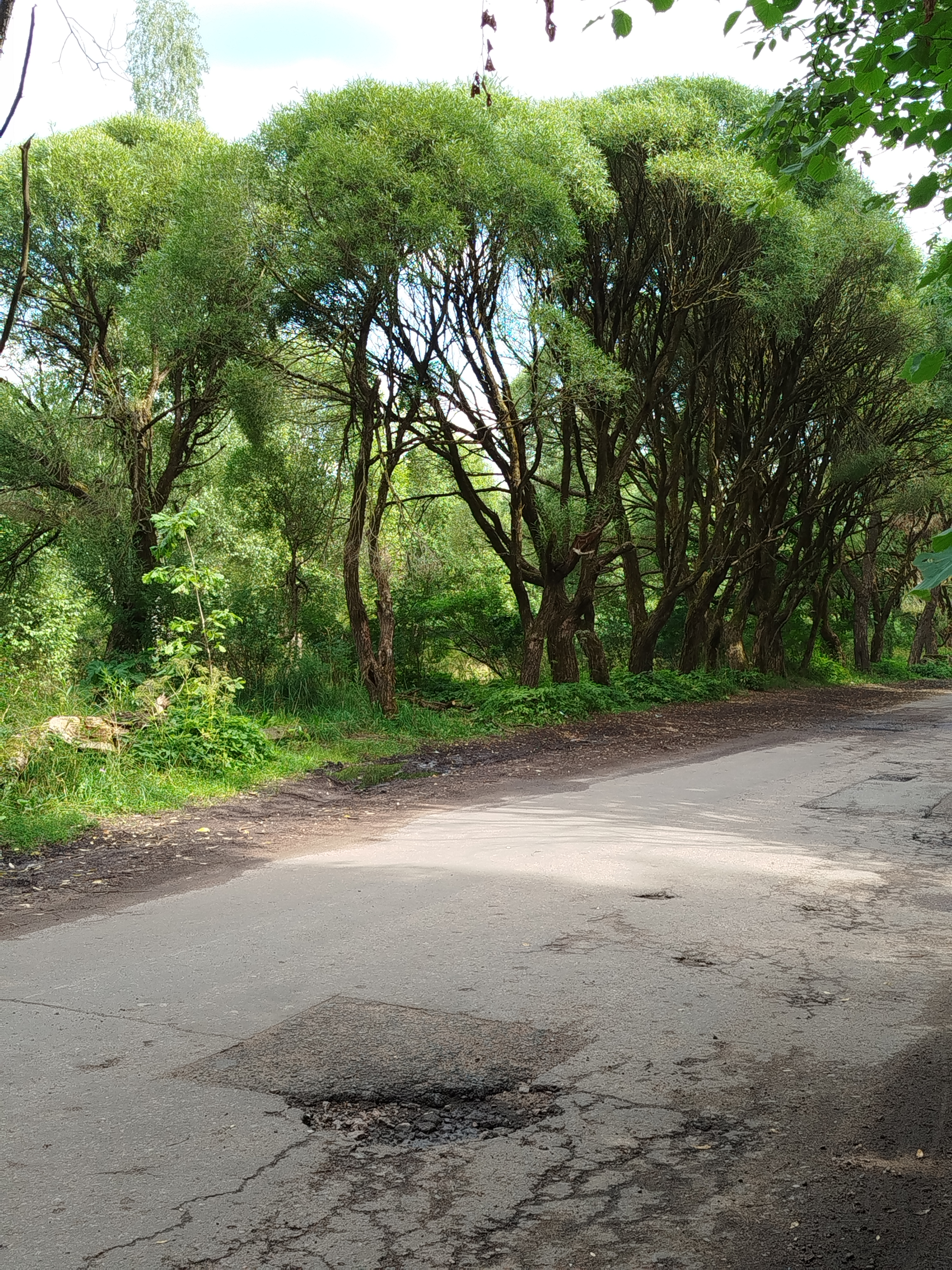

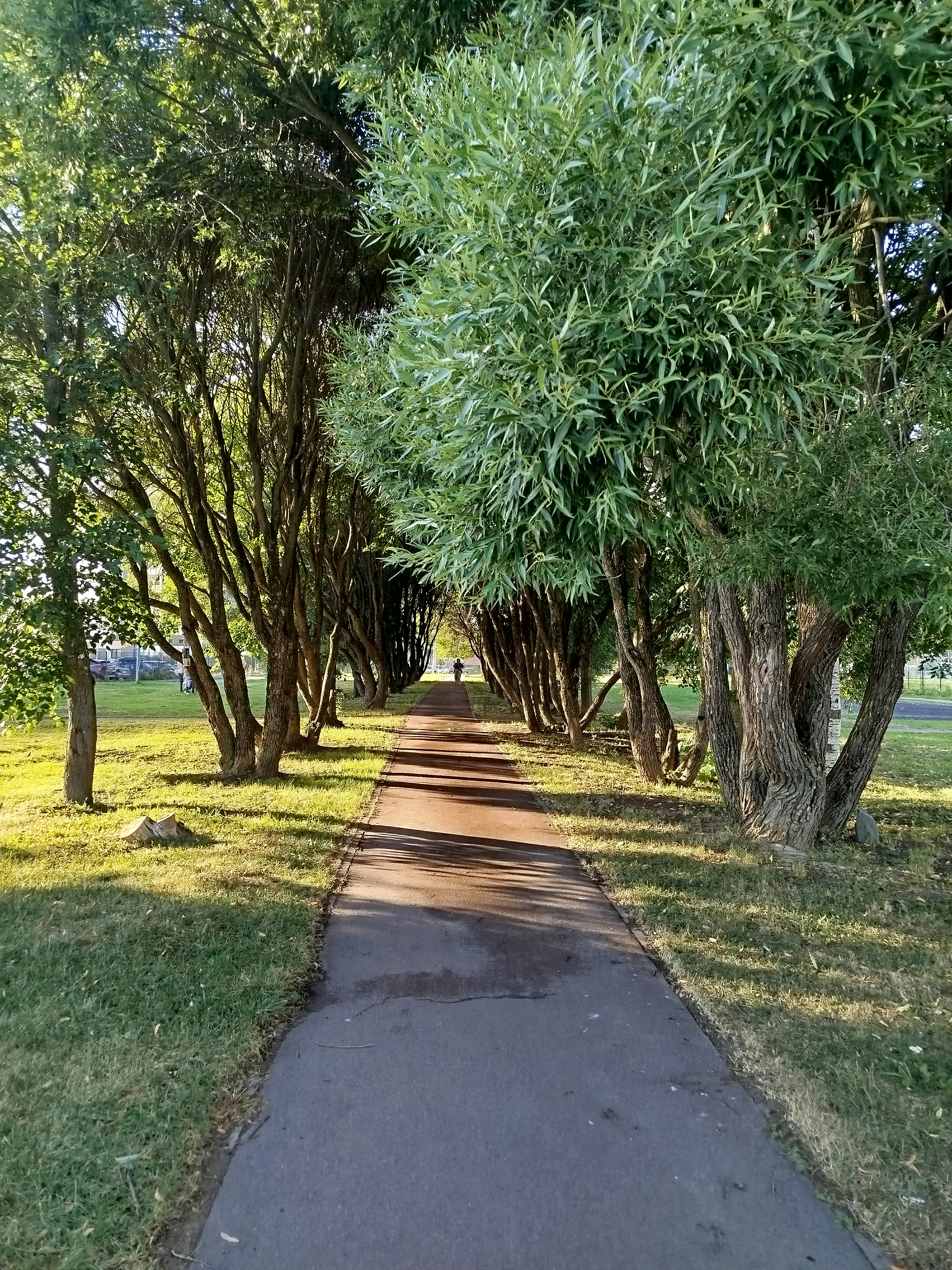

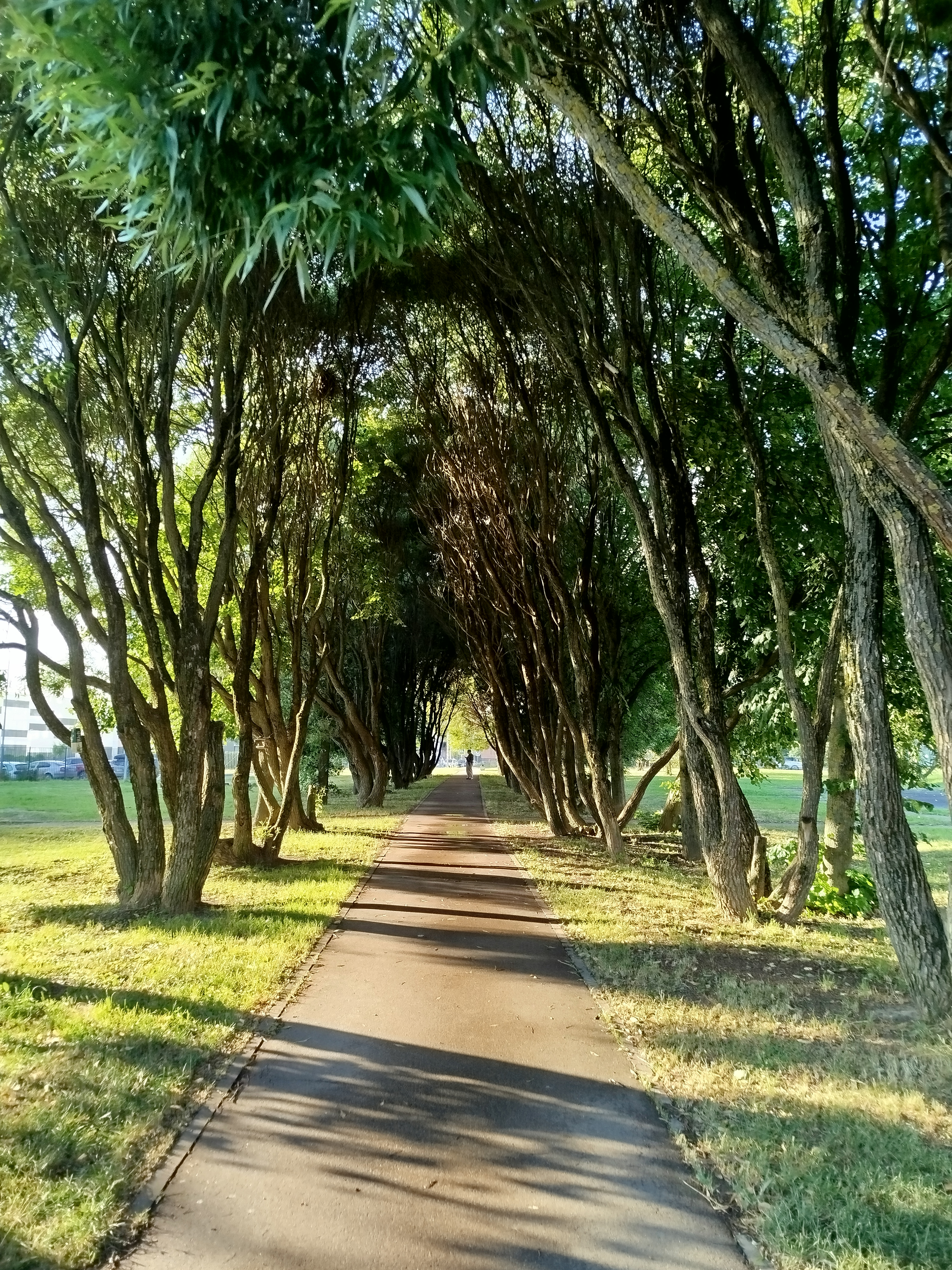

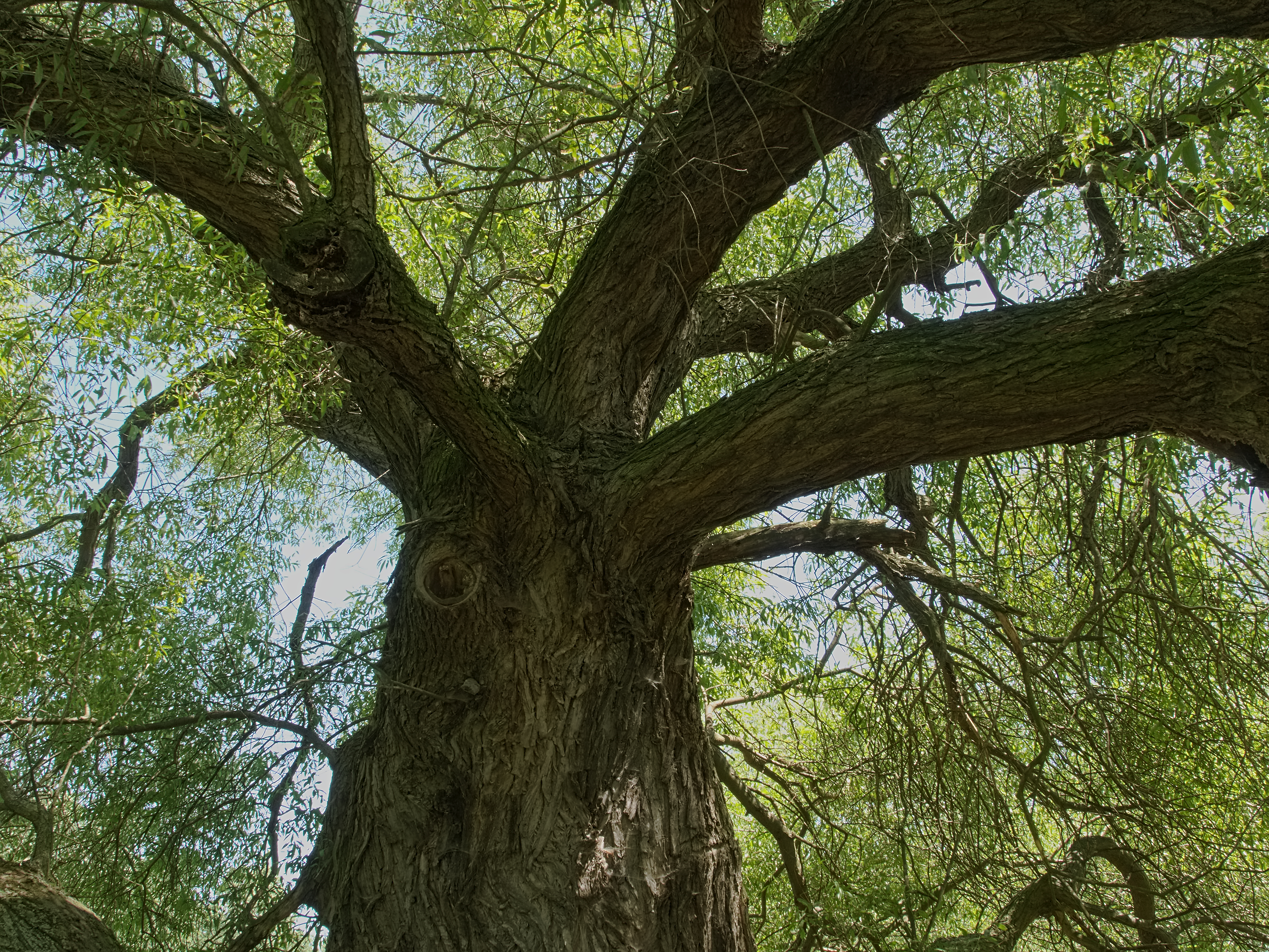

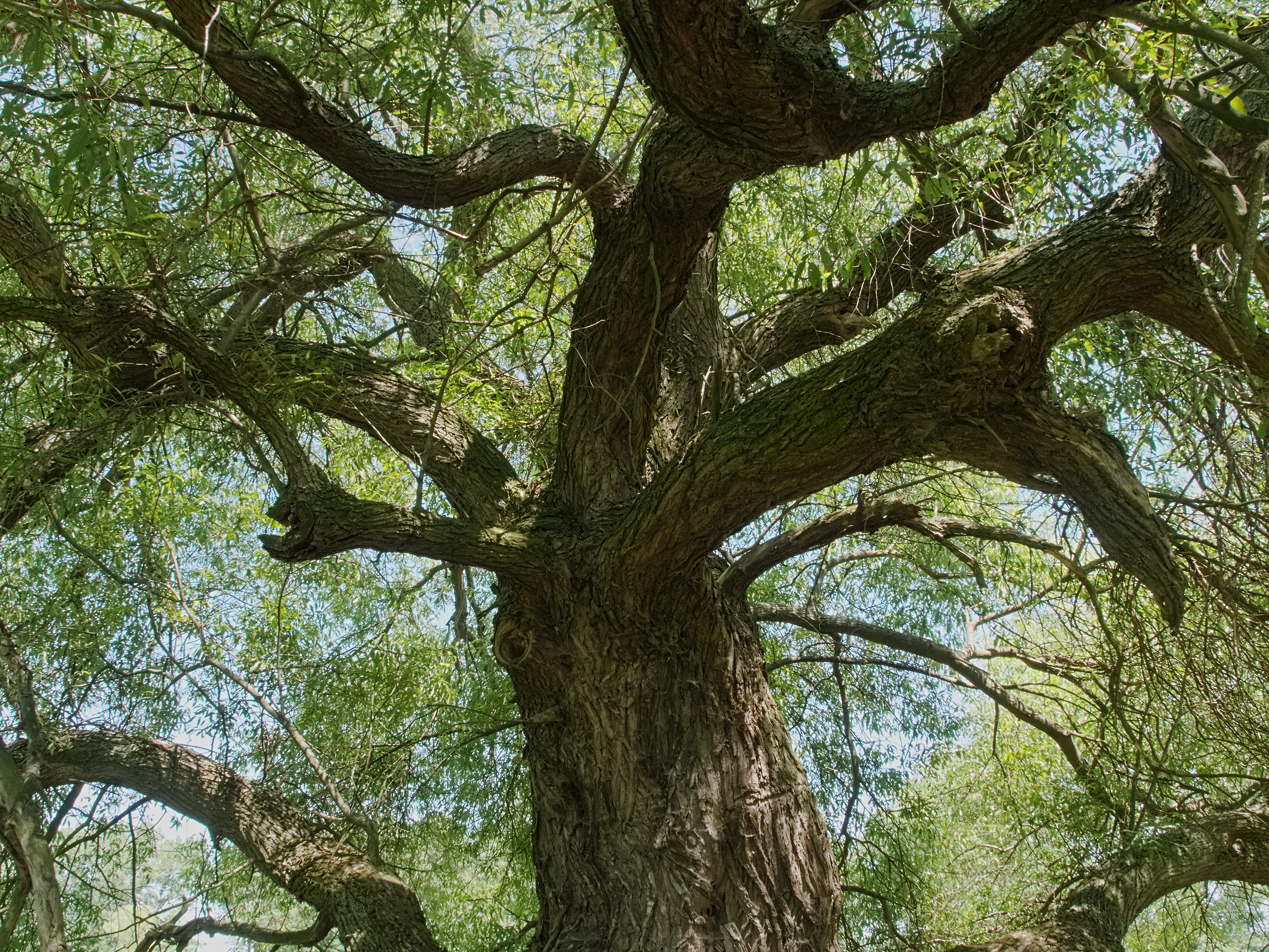

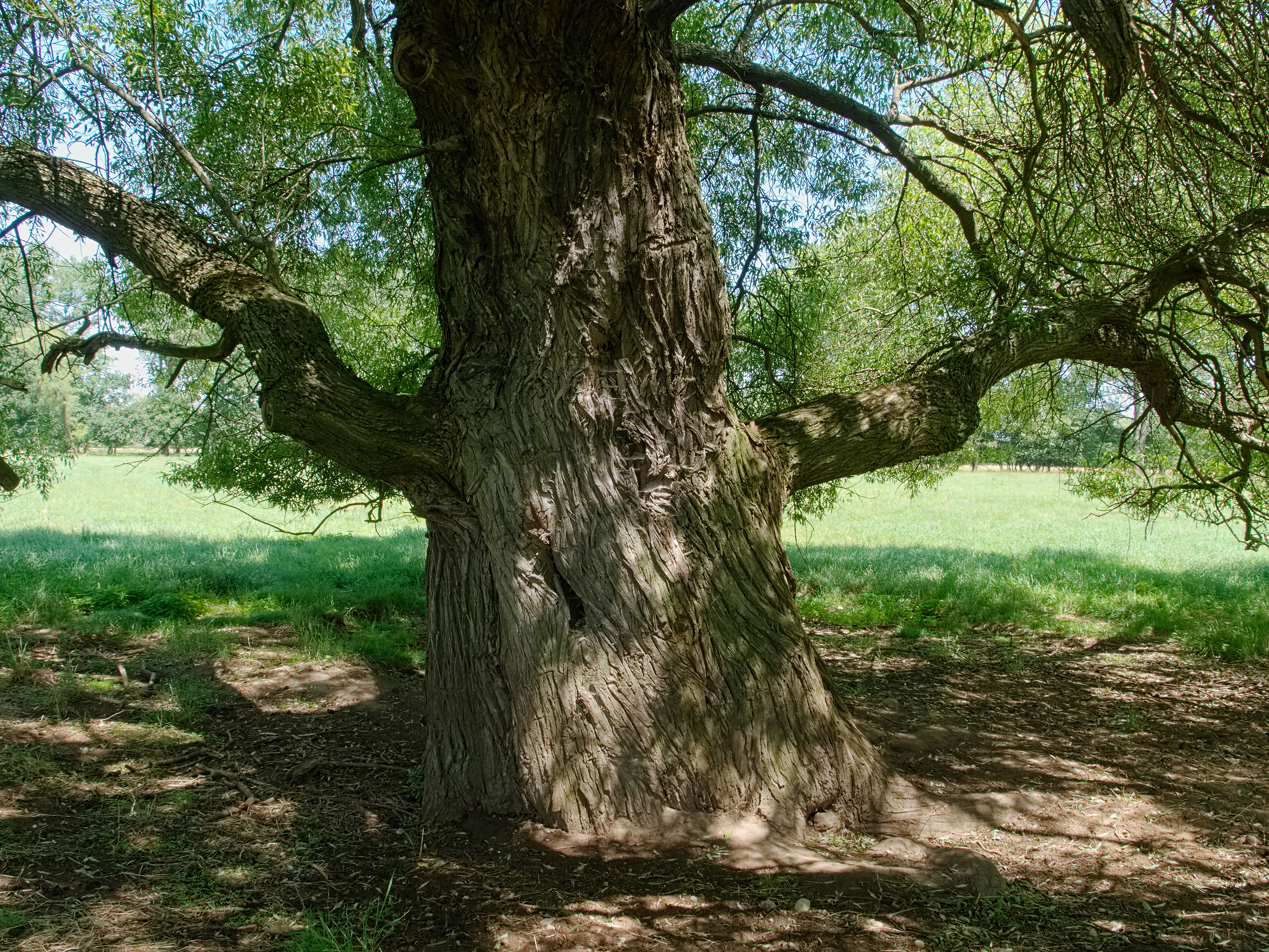

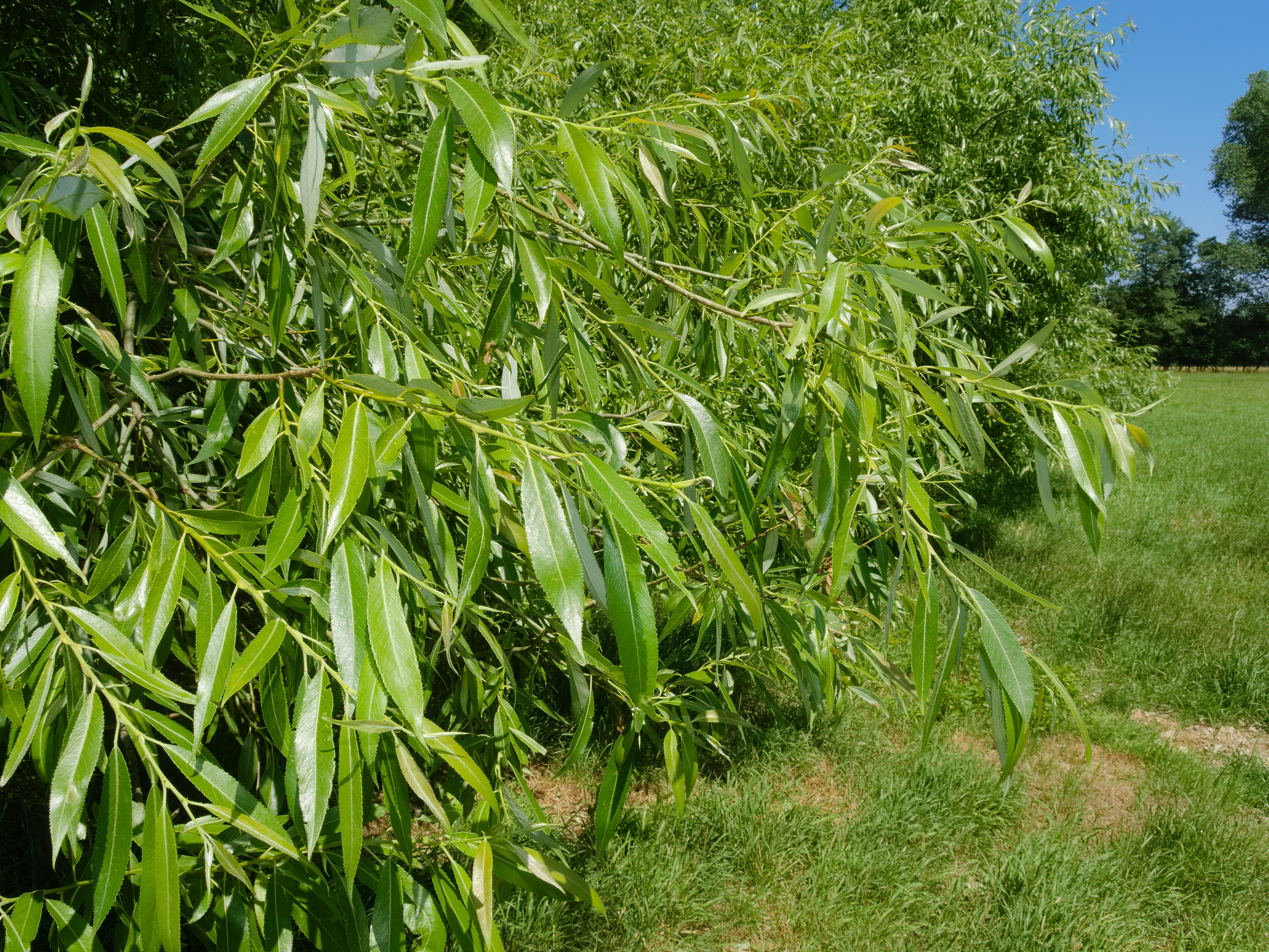

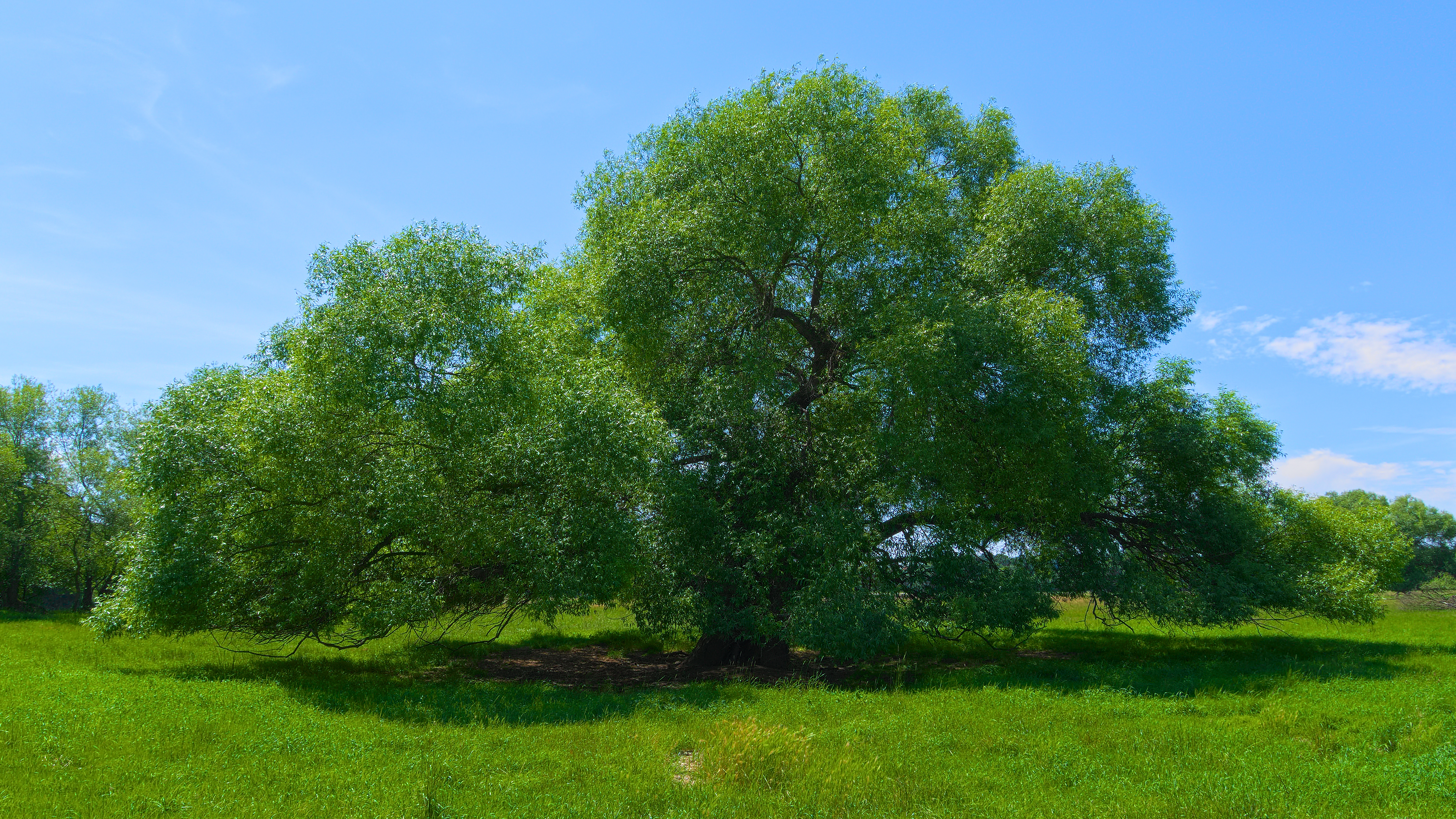

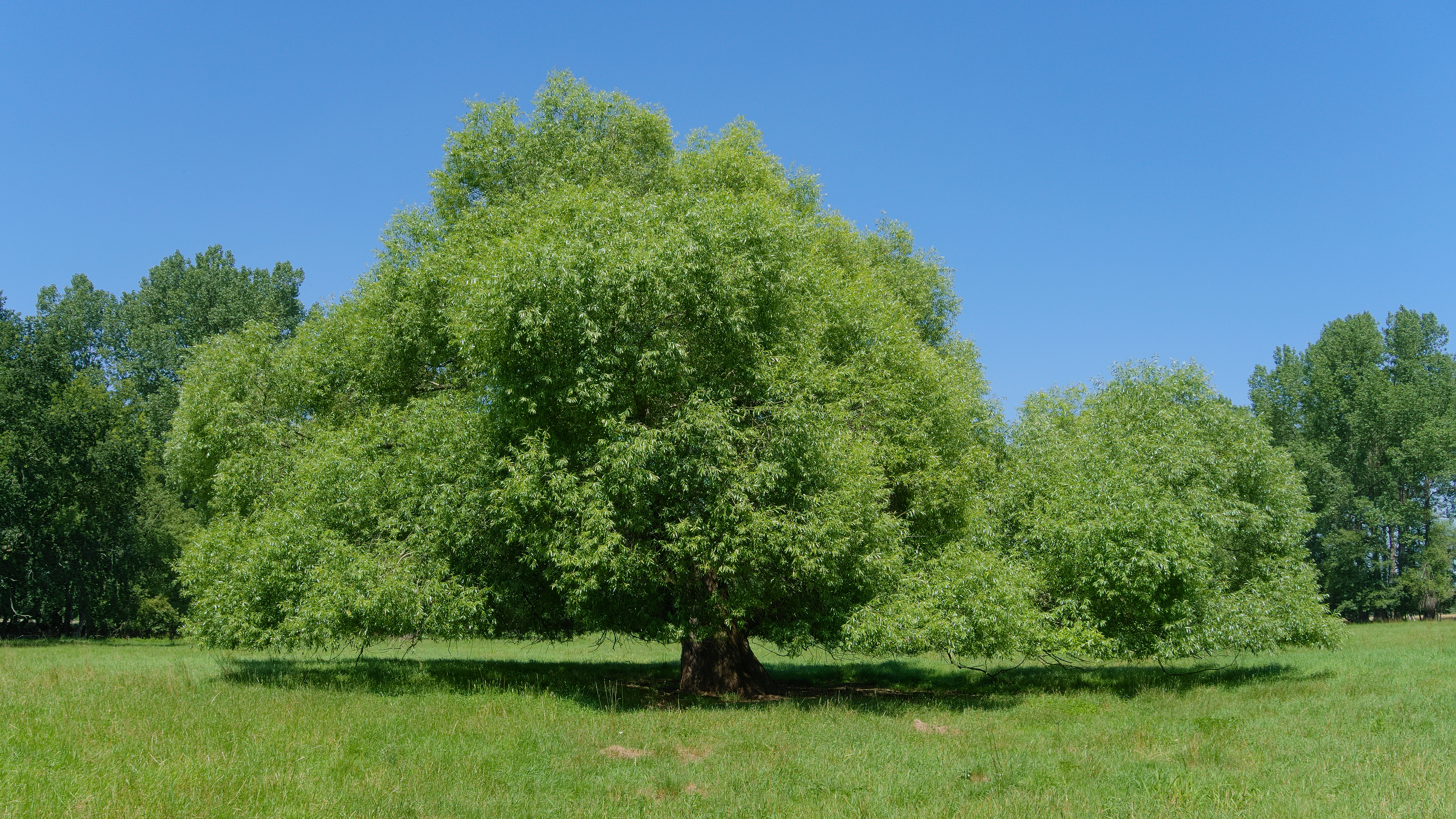

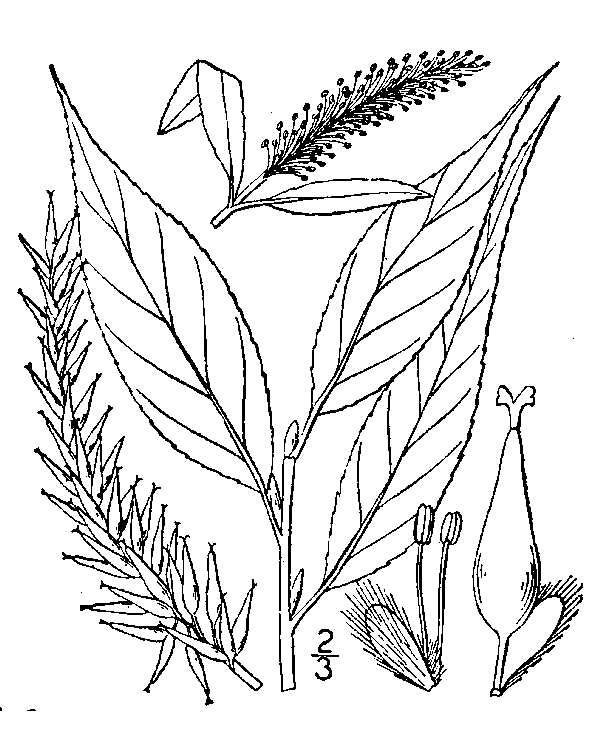

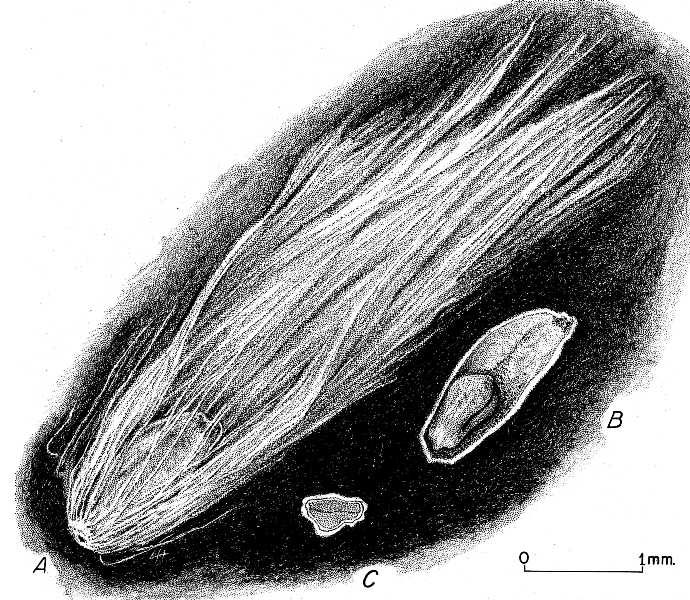

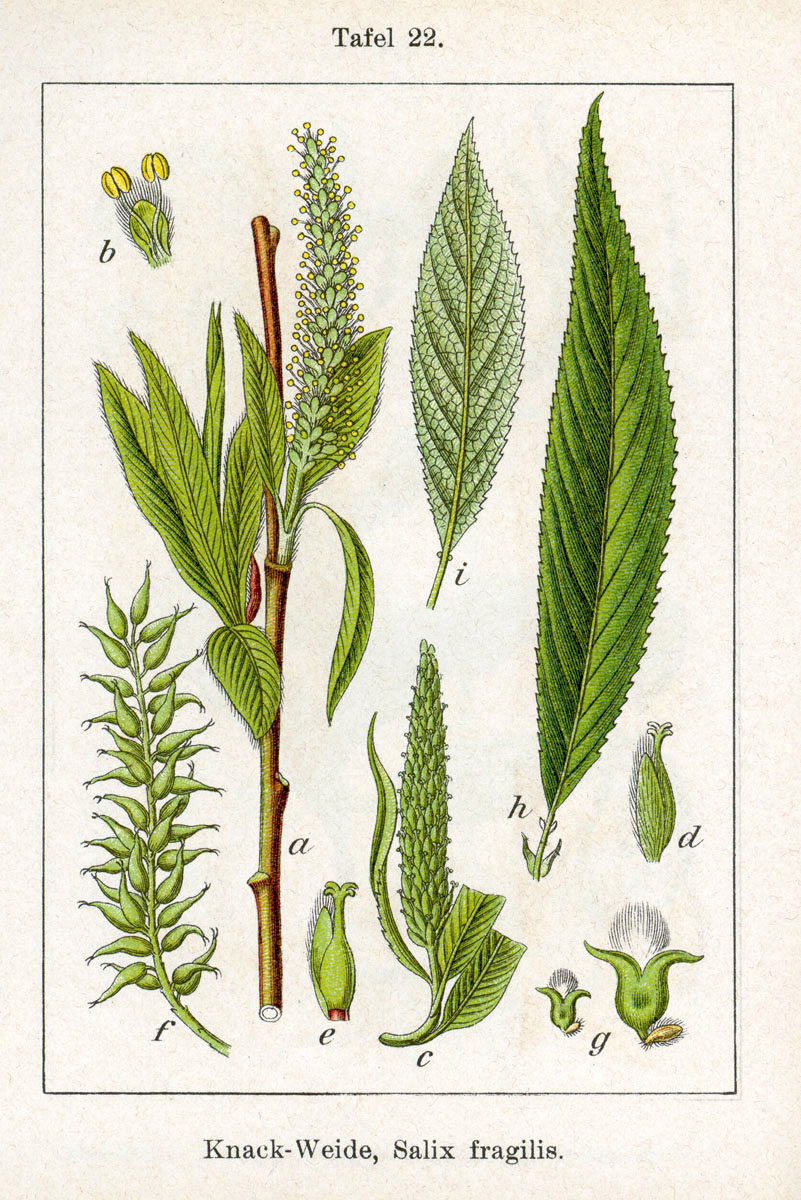

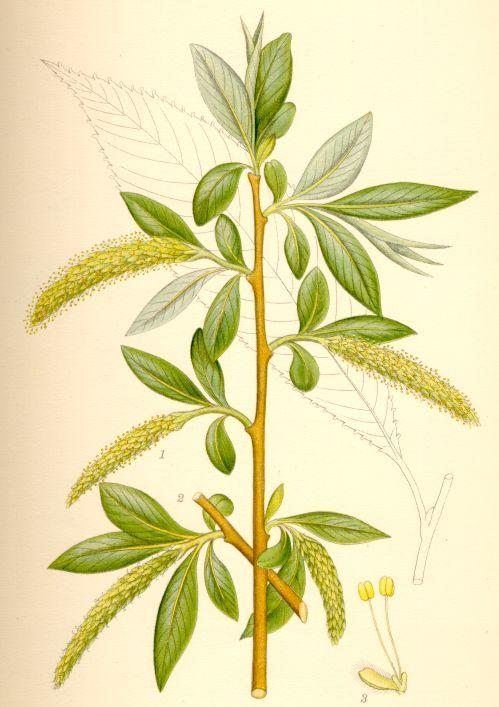

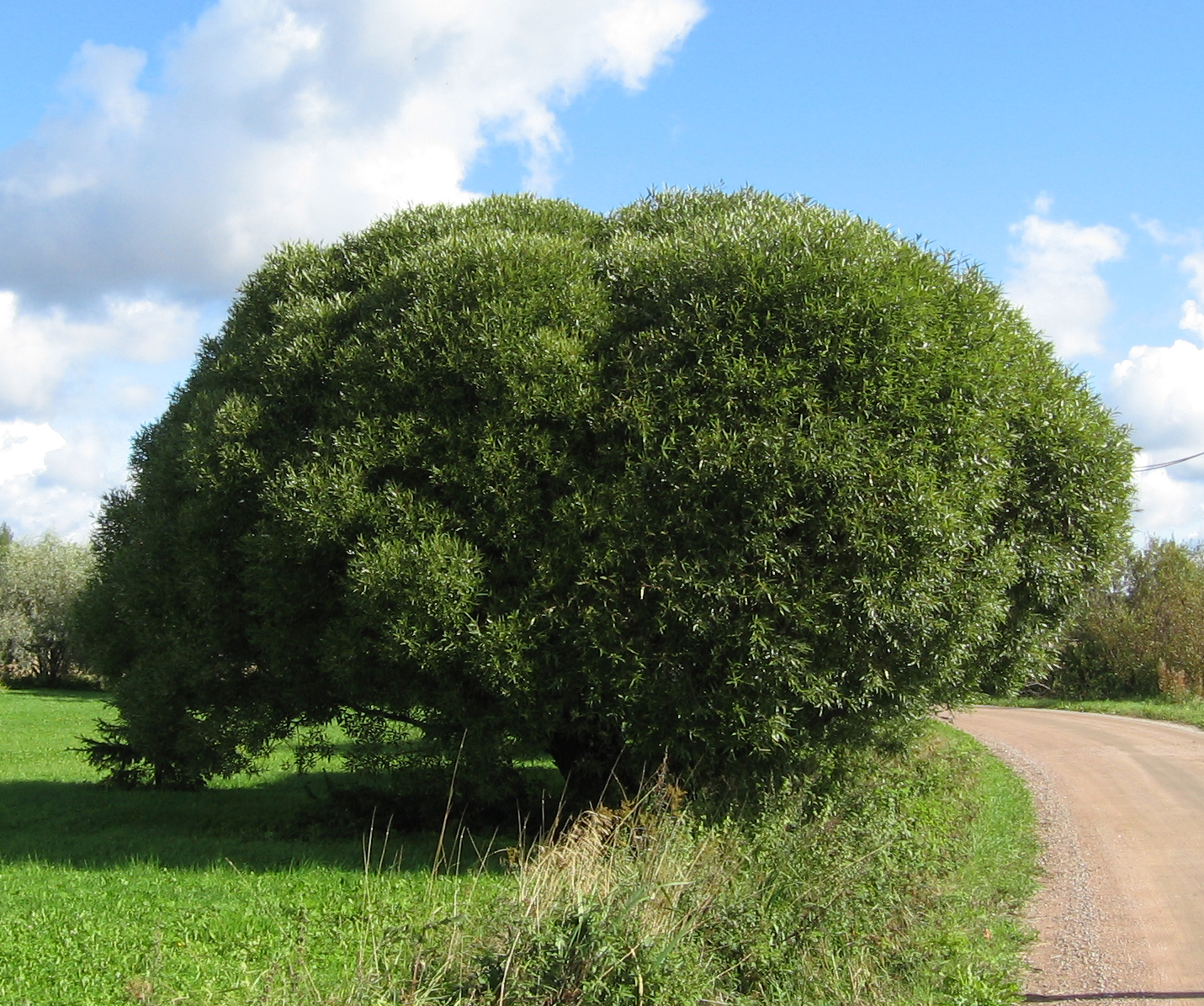

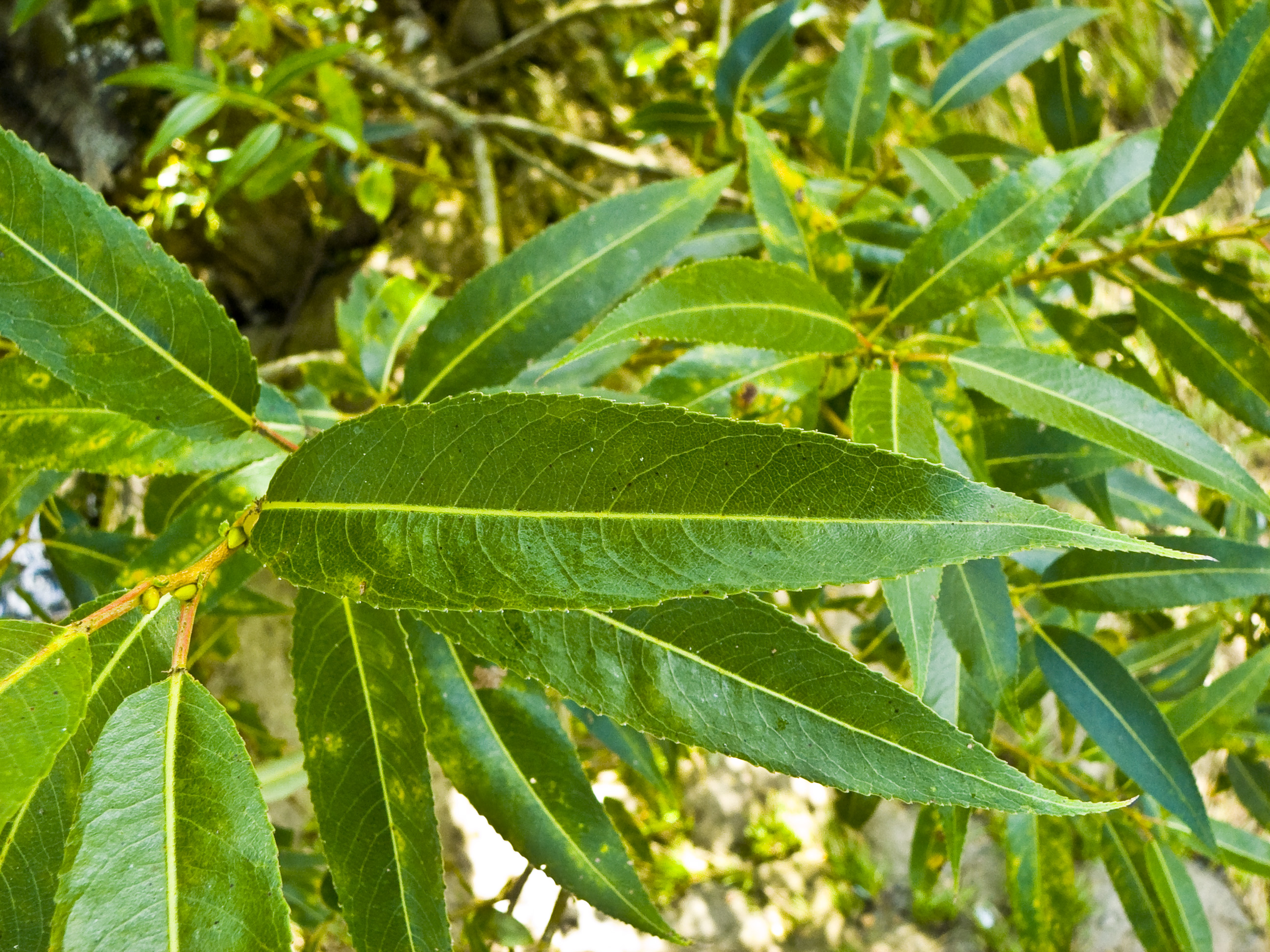

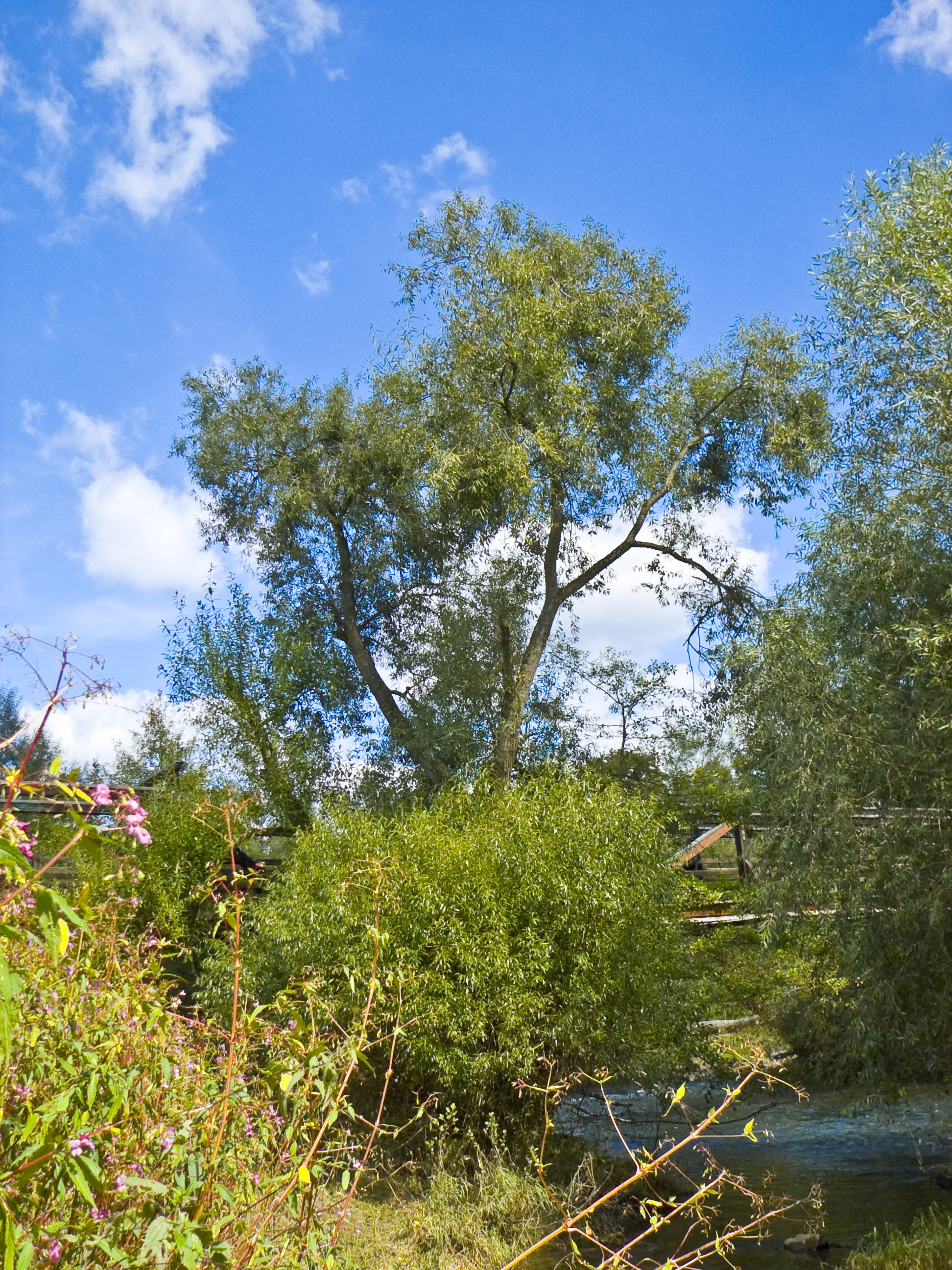

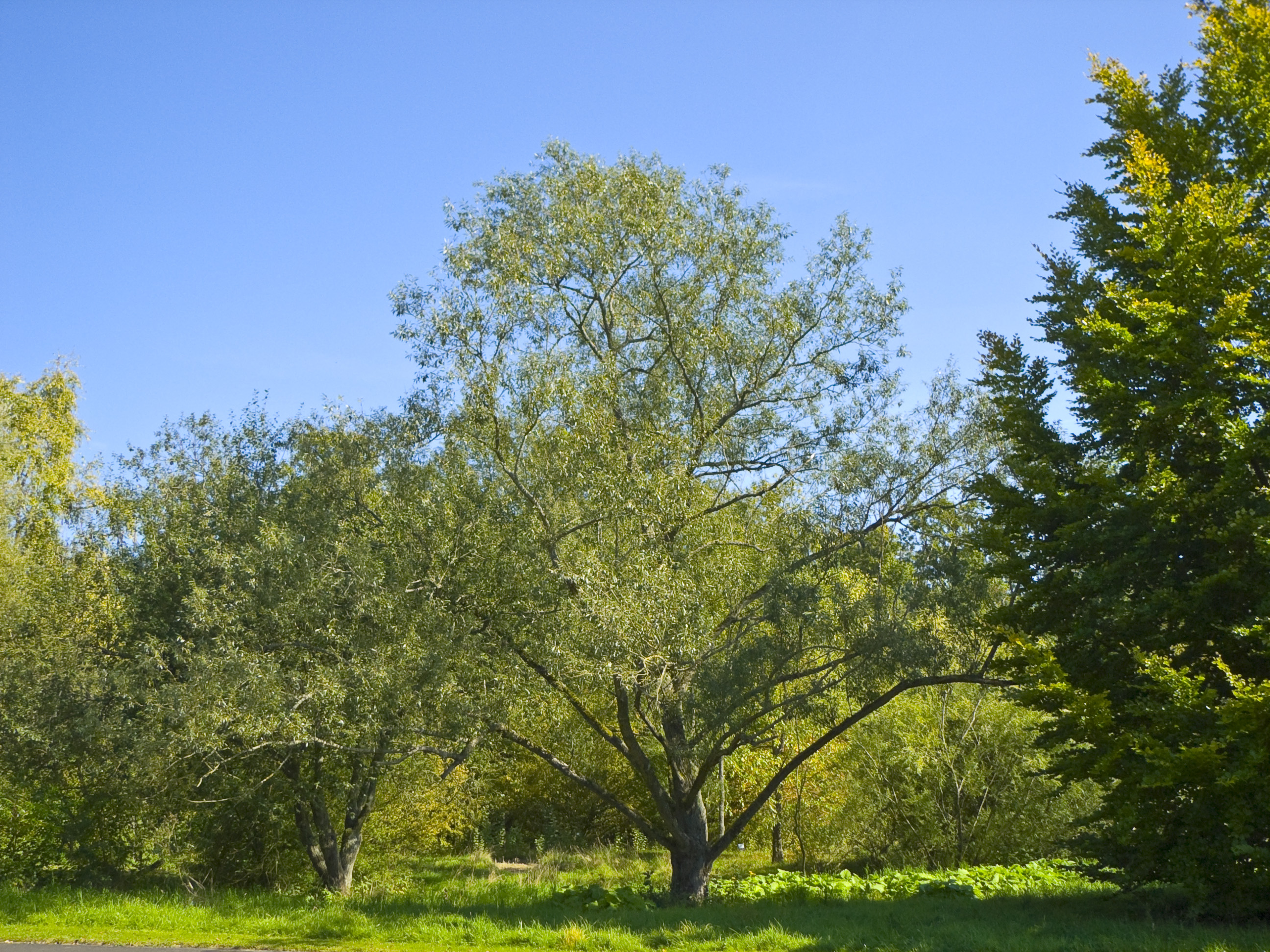

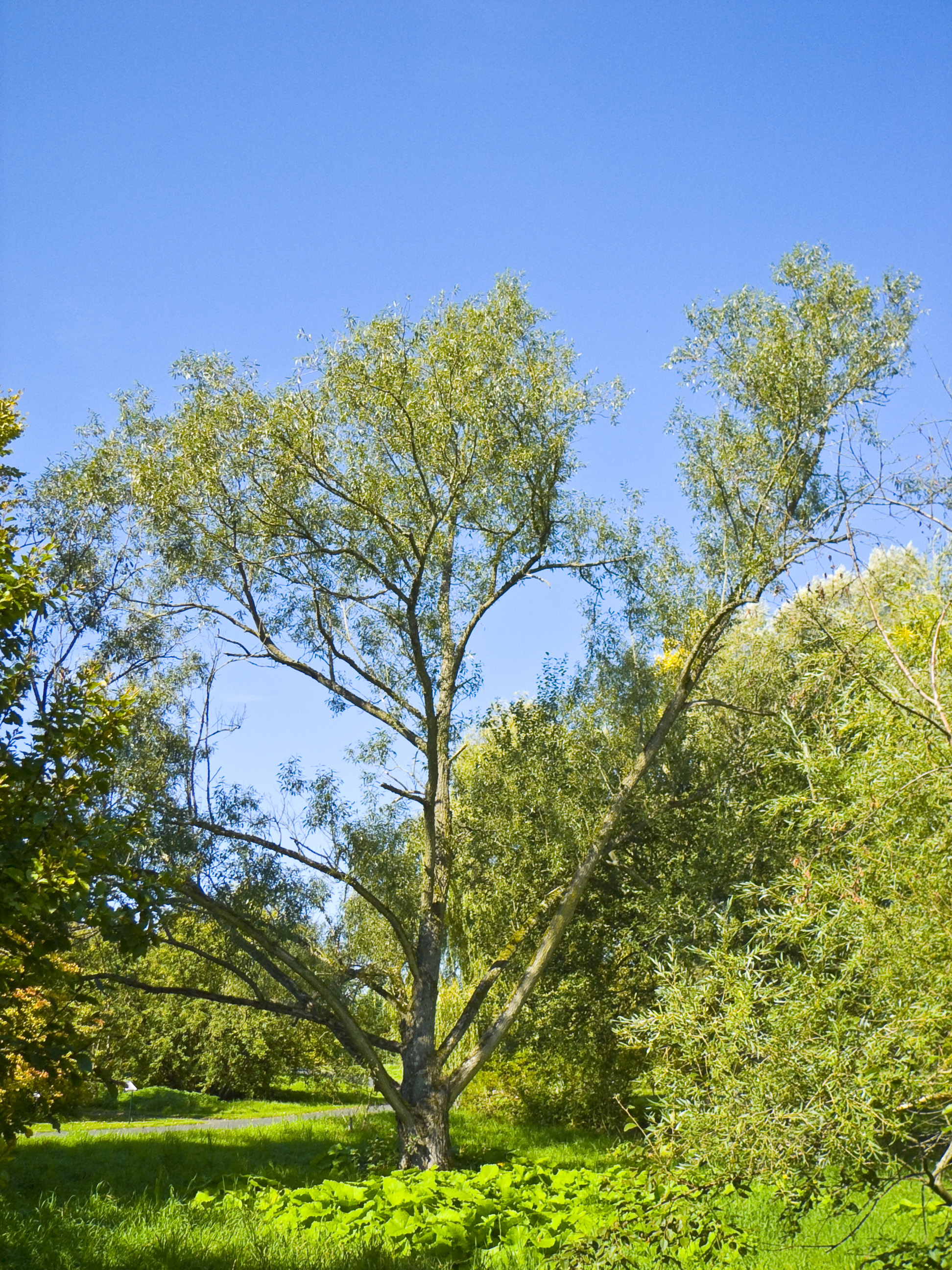

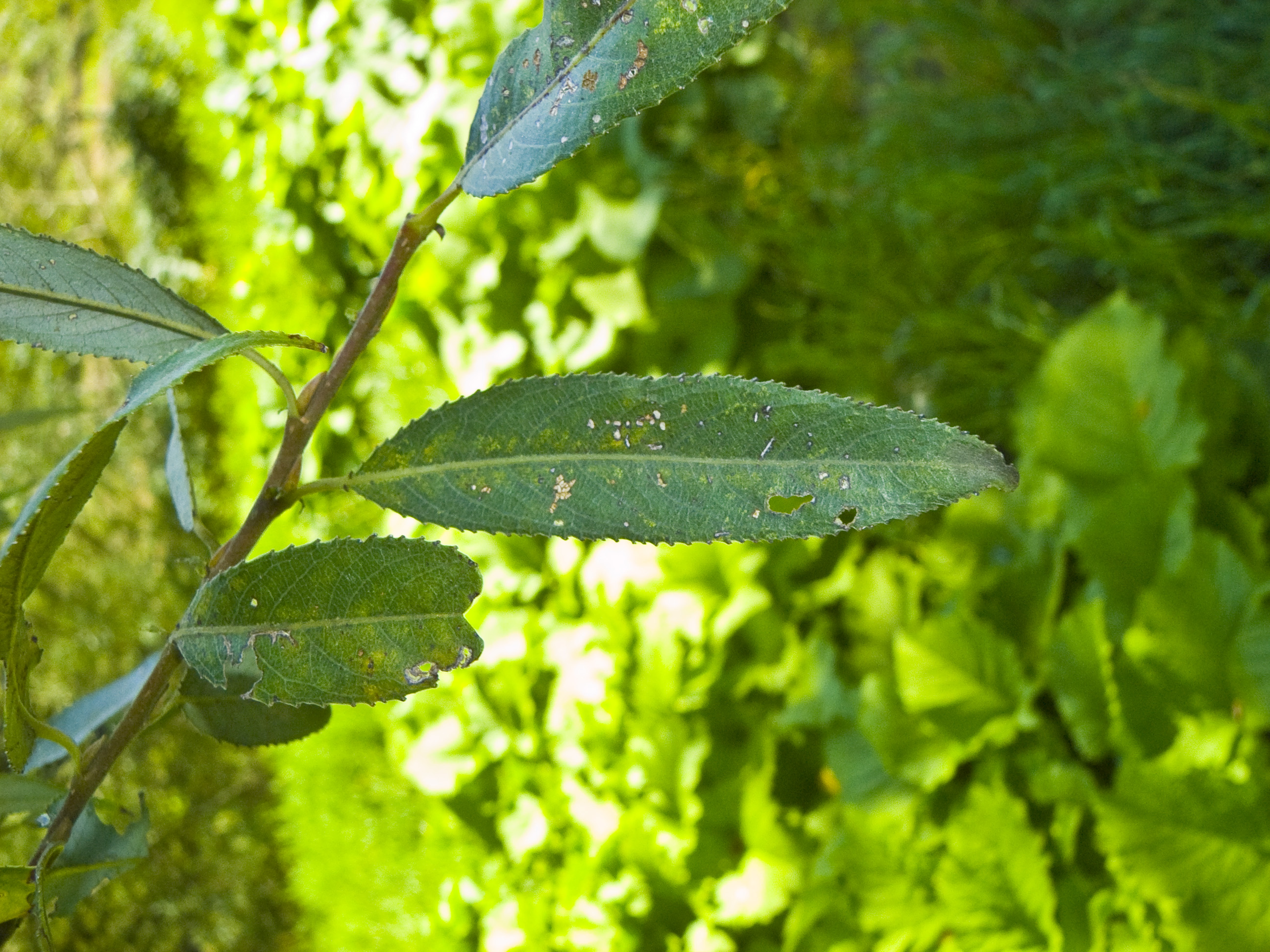

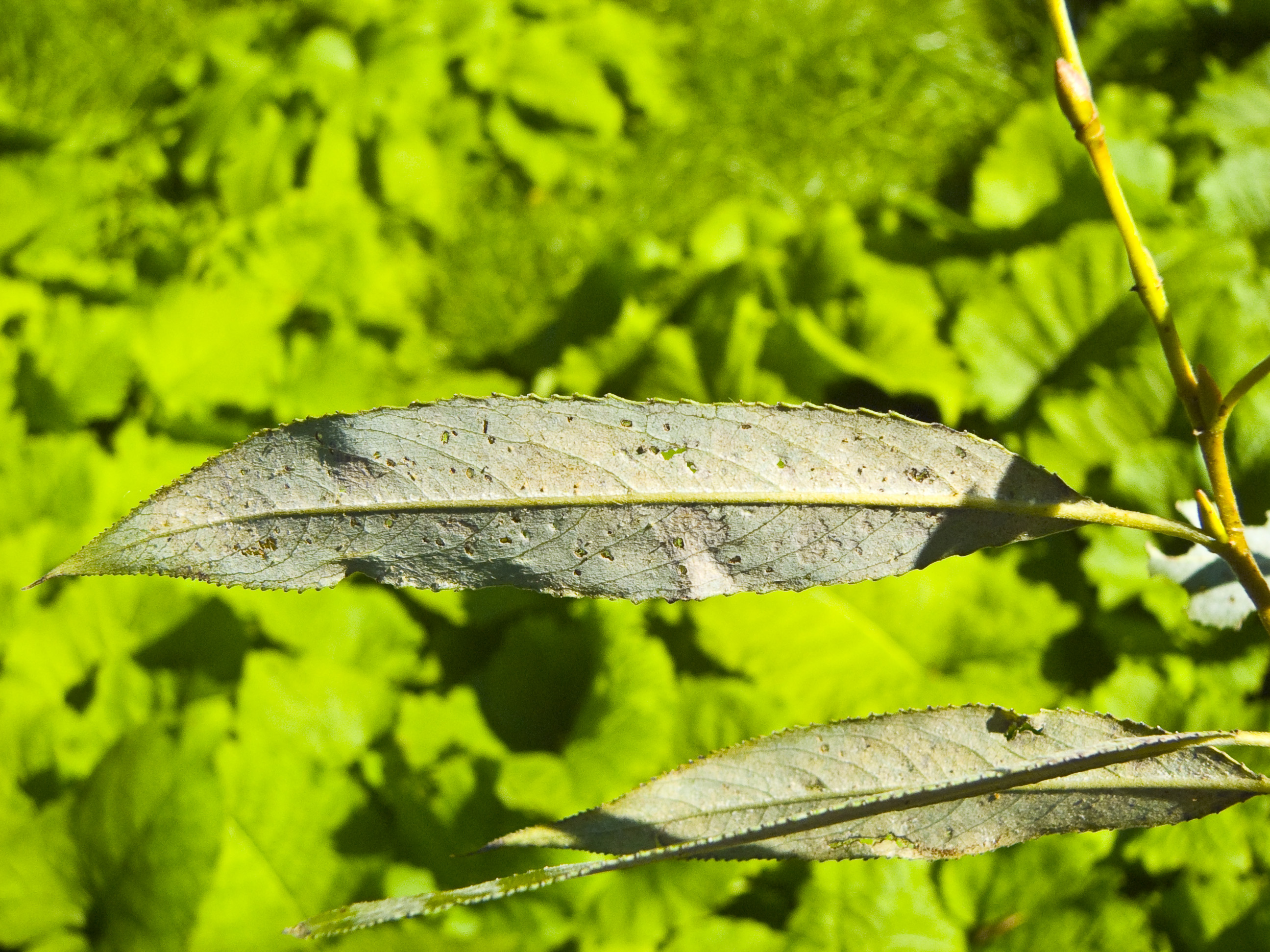
