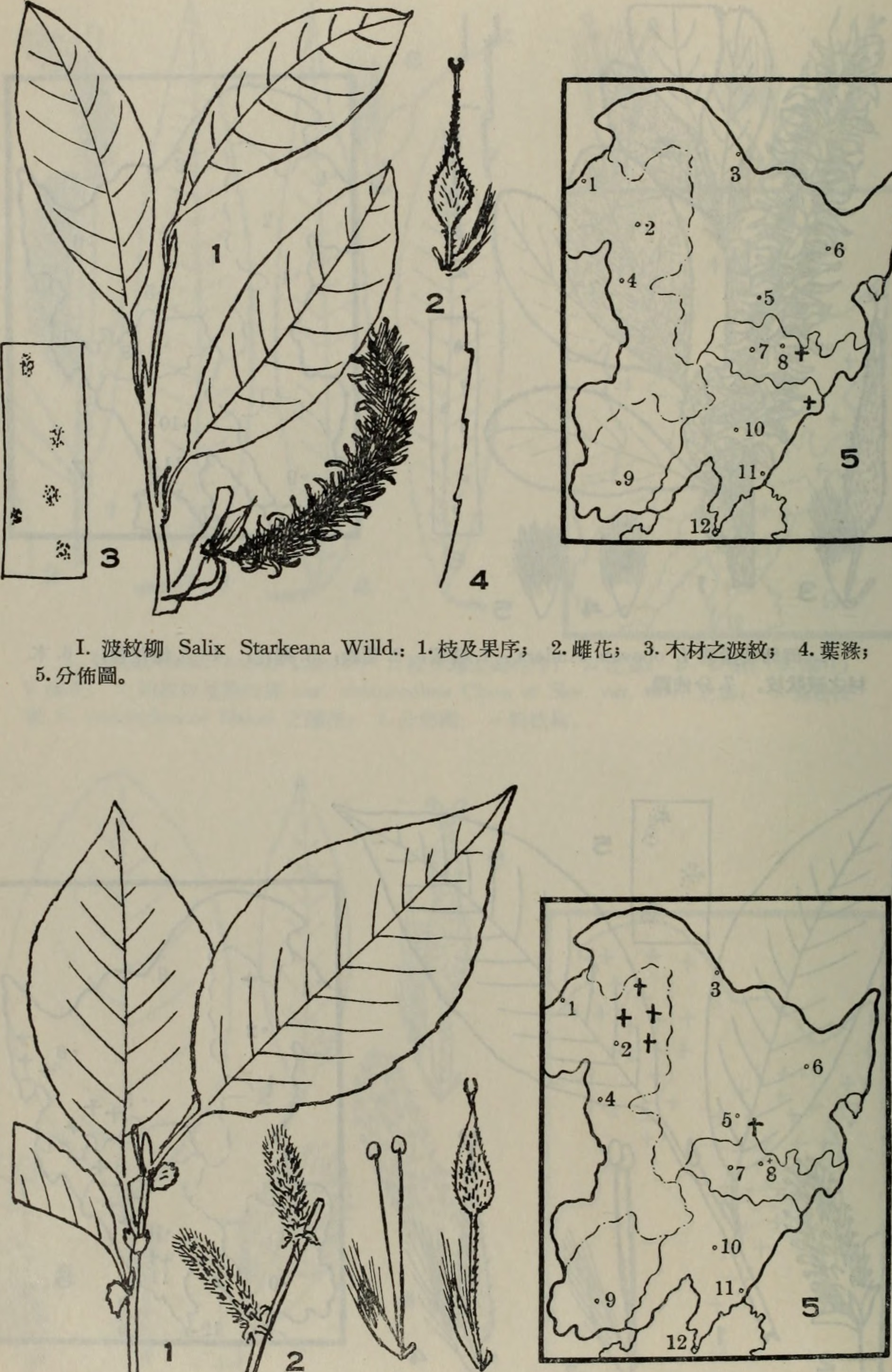

Scientific classification
- Kingdom: Plantae
- Clade: Tracheophytes
- Clade: Angiosperms
- Clade: Eudicots
- Clade: Rosids
- Order: Malpighiales
- Family: Salicaceae
- Genus: Salix
- Species: S. starkeana

Binomial name
- Salix starkeana Vill.

= Salix starkeana =

Shrub in the genus of willows

Salix starkeana is a small, prostrate shrub from the genus of willows (Salix) with red-brown to purple-red, bare branches and olive-green leaf tops. The natural range of the species is in Europe and in northern Asia.

== Description ==
The pale willow is up to 1 meter high, prostrate to arching ascending shrub with thin, red-brown to purple-red, bare branches. Young shoots are initially hairy and shed later. The leaves are broadly elliptic to semi-kidney-shaped stipules. The petiole is about 5 millimeters long. The leaf blade is 5 to 7 centimeters long, 1.5 to 2 centimeters wide, broadly lanceolate to ovoid or obovate, suddenly pointed, with a narrowed base and a glandular serrated leaf margin. The upper side of the leaf is initially slightly hairy, later balding, weakly shiny, olive-green and nervous. The underside is bare and deep to blue-green. Six to eight pairs of nerves are formed.

1 to 3 centimeters long, elliptical catkins are formed as inflorescences on a 1 centimeter long stalk covered with leaves. The bracts are yellowish or brownish, glabrous and long bearded only on the edge. A nectar gland is formed per flower. Male flowers have two almost bare stamens. The ovary of female flowers is long-stalked and densely hairy. The stylus is formed clearly, the scar is divided gabelig. The pale willow flowers from March to April at the same time as the leaves shoot.

The number of chromosomes is 2n = 38 or 44.

== Occurrence and location requirements ==
The natural distribution area extends from Northern Europe (Finland, Norway, Sweden) through Central Europe (Germany, Poland, Czech Republic, Slovakia) to Romania and the far east of Russia (Siberia, Primorye region). [5] In Germany there are stocks in Bavaria and Baden-Württemberg, the populations in Bavaria being listed as threatened with extinction and in Baden-Württemberg as endangered. The pale willow grows in bogs and swamp areas on boggy and wet peaty soils in sunny to light-shaded locations. The circulation area becomes the winter hardiness zone5a assigned to mean annual minimum temperatures of −28.8 to −26.0 °C (−20 to −15 °F).

The pale willow thrives in Central Europe in cold winter, frost-rich areas. It is a character species of the Polygono-viviparo-Nestedum sagittalis from the Violion caninae association, but also occurs in the Molinion association or in the Betulo-Salicetum repentis.

== Taxonomy ==
The pale willow (Salix starkeana) is a species from the genus of willows (Salix) in the willow family (Salicaceae). It was described in 1806 by Carl Ludwig Willdenow. The generic name Salix comes from Latin and was already used by the Romans for various types of willow. A synonym of the species is Salix livida Wahlenb. Wahlenb.

== Literature ==
- Andreas Roloff, Andreas Bärtels: Flora of the woods. Purpose, properties and use. With a winter key from Bernd Schulz. 3rd, corrected edition. Eugen Ulmer, Stuttgart (Hohenheim) 2008, ISBN 978-3-8001-5614-6, pp. 588–589.
- Jost Fitschen: Woody flora. 12th, revised and expanded edition. Quelle & Meyer, Wiebelsheim 2007, ISBN 3-494-01422-1, p. 761 .
- Helmut Genaust: Etymological dictionary of botanical plant names. 3rd, completely revised and expanded edition. Nikol, Hamburg 2005, ISBN 3-937872-16-7 (reprint from 1996).
