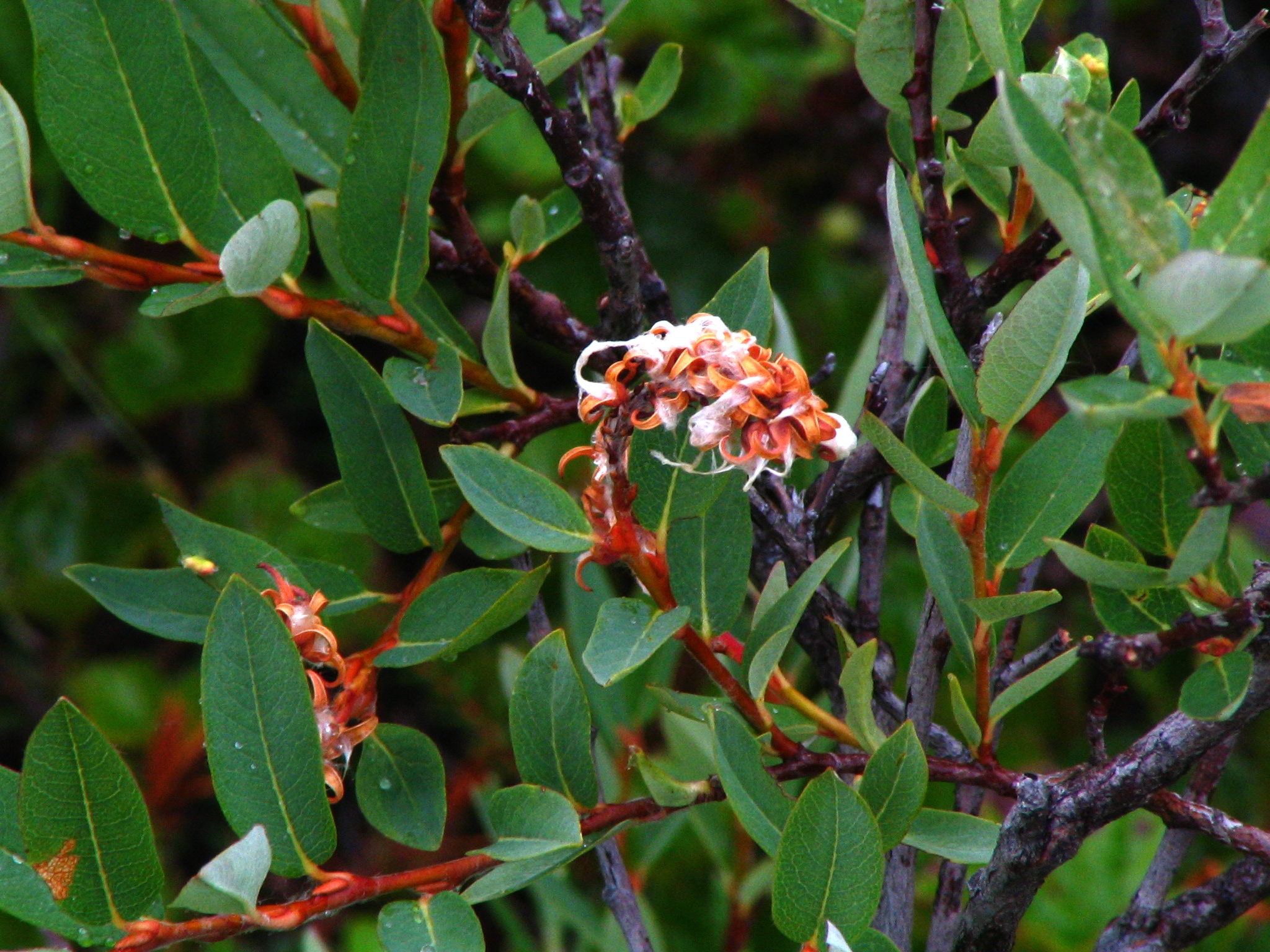
- Salix myrtilloides in northern Norway

Scientific classification
- Kingdom: Plantae
- Clade: Tracheophytes
- Clade: Angiosperms
- Clade: Eudicots
- Clade: Rosids
- Order: Malpighiales
- Family: Salicaceae
- Genus: Salix
- Species: S. myrtilloides

Binomial name
- Salix myrtilloides L.

= Salix myrtilloides =

Species of willow

Salix myrtilloides, the swamp willow, is a species of willow native to boglands in cool temperate to subarctic regions of northeastern Europe and northern Asia from central Norway and Poland eastwards to the Pacific Ocean coast, with isolated populations further south in mountain bogs in the Alps, Carpathians and Sikhote-Alin mountains.

It is a deciduous small shrub growing to 15–60 cm (5.9–23.6 in) tall. The leaves are oval-acute, 15–20 mm long, with an entire or sparsely toothed margin, dark green above, paler glaucous or purple-tinged below. The flowers are produced in catkins 1–2 cm long in the spring at the same time as the new leaves appear.

The leaves resemble bilberry (Vaccinium uliginosum) leaves in shape, hence the name in the Finnish and Swedish languages, which translates as "bog bilberry willow".

A very similar, closely related species, Salix pedicellaris (bog willow), occurs in northern North America; it is classified as a variety of swamp willow S. myrtilloides var. pedicellaris by some botanists.
