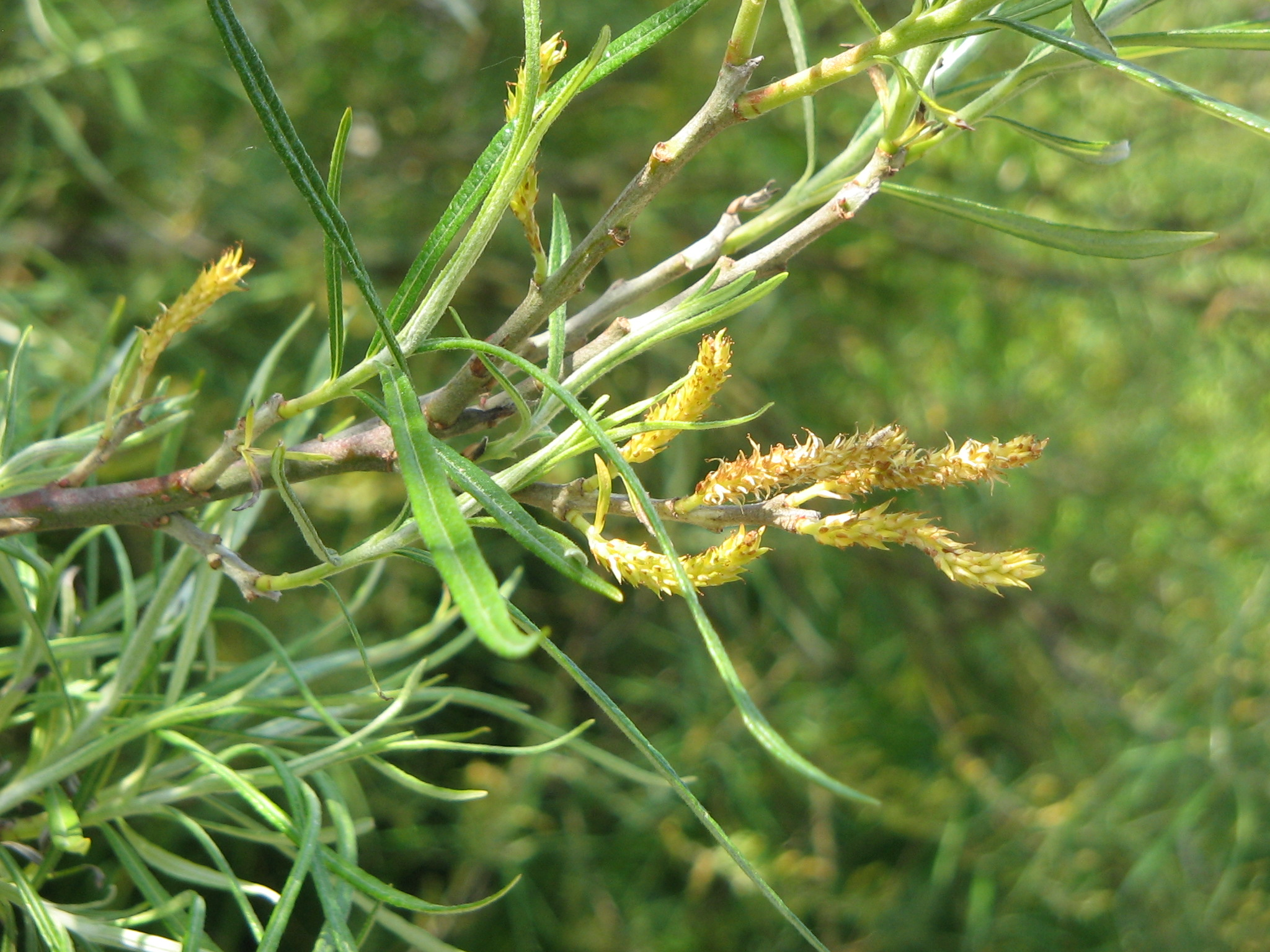

Scientific classification
- Kingdom: Plantae
- Clade: Tracheophytes
- Clade: Angiosperms
- Clade: Eudicots
- Clade: Rosids
- Order: Malpighiales
- Family: Salicaceae
- Genus: Salix
- Species: S. rosmarinifolia

Binomial name
- Salix rosmarinifolia L.

= Salix rosmarinifolia =

Species of flowering plant

Salix rosmarinifolia (vernacular name: rosemary-leaved willow) is a species of flowering plant belonging to the family Salicaceae.

It is native to Europe.
