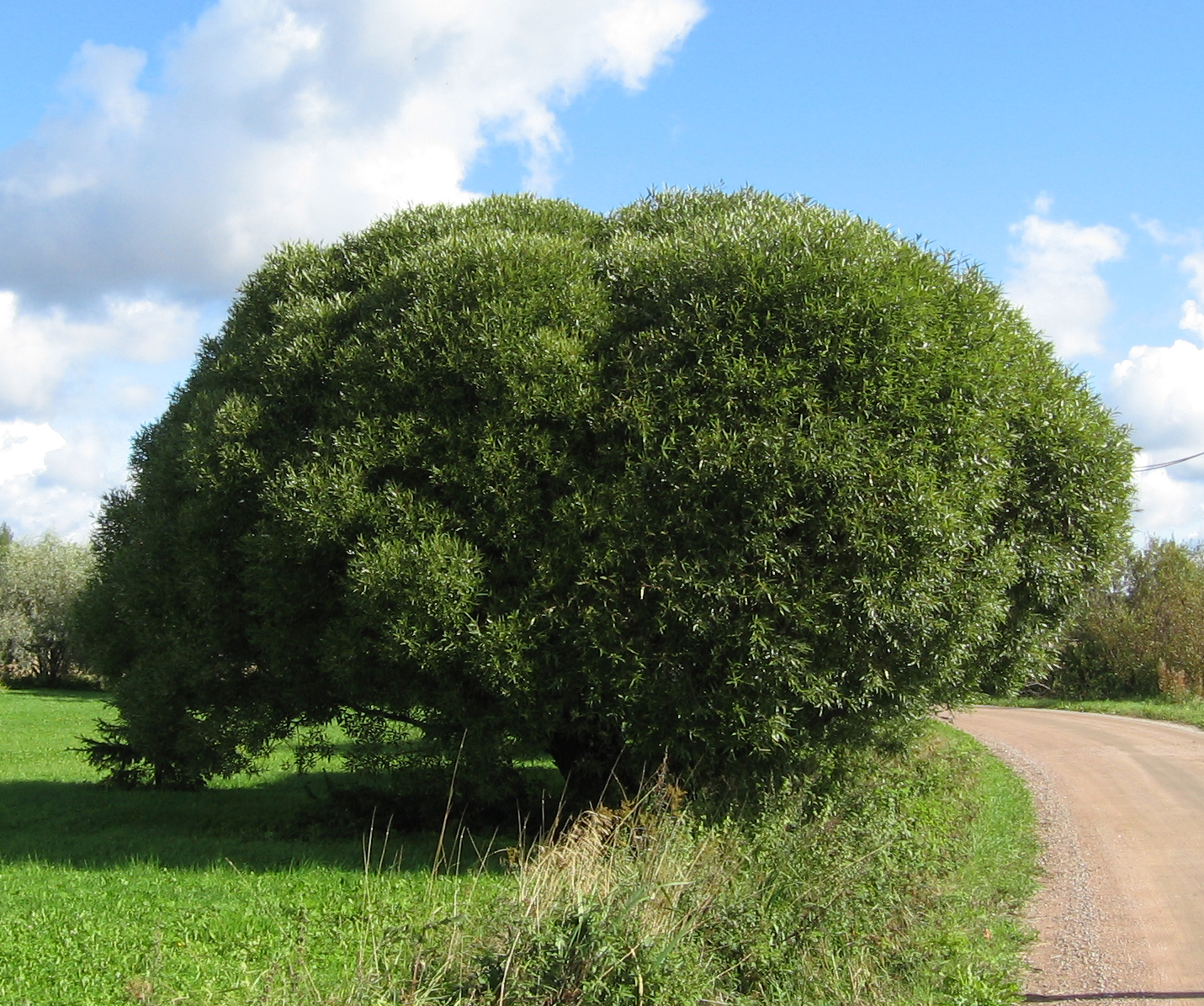
- The cultivar 'Bullata'

Scientific classification
- Kingdom: Plantae
- Clade: Tracheophytes
- Clade: Angiosperms
- Clade: Eudicots
- Clade: Rosids
- Order: Malpighiales
- Family: Salicaceae
- Genus: Salix
- Species: S. euxina

Binomial name
- Salix euxina I.V.Belyaeva

Synonyms
- Salix fragilis Host, not Salix × fragilis L.

= Salix euxina =

Species of plant

Salix euxina, the eastern crack-willow, is a species of flowering plant in the willow family Salicaceae, native from Turkey to the Caucasus. It was first described by I. V. Belyaeva in 2009. It is one of the parents of the common crack-willow, Salix × fragilis.

== Description ==
Salix euxina is a tree that can reach 15–20 m high with a trunk diameter of up to 1 m. It has a wide crown, and old trees develop deeply fissured bark on their trunks. The olive green branchlets are hairless (glabrous) and very brittle at the base, so that branches easily break off. These are able to root and propagate the species. The leaves are pale green and glabrous. They have stomata only on the undersurface. The catkins are relatively thick with somewhat densely clustered flowers.

Salix × fragilis, the hybrid between Salix euxina and Salix alba, has hairs on its branches and branchlets, stomata on both surfaces of its leaves, and slender, more loosely flowered catkins.

== Taxonomy ==
In 1753, Carl Linnaeus described the species Salix fragilis. From at least the 1920s, botanists applied Linnaeus's name "Salix fragilis" both to a pure species and to its hybrid with Salix alba. In 2009, the Nomenclature Committee for Vascular Plants decided to conserve the name "Salix fragilis" for the hybrid, and Irina V. Belyaeva then described the previously unnamed parent species as Salix euxina. The epithet euxina refers to the distribution of the species around the Black Sea, known as Πόντος Εὔξεινος (Pontos Euxeinos) in Ancient Greek.

== Distribution and habitat ==
Salix euxina is native to a narrow region around the east of the Black Sea, including northern Turkey, the North Caucasus and the Transcaucasus, where it is found beside mountain streams. It has been introduced into parts of Europe (Belgium, European Russia, Great Britain and the Netherlands) and Canada (Ontario and Quebec). In Europe, it is much less common than the hybrid S. fragilis, making up only around 10% of all specimens.

== Cultivation ==
The name "Salix fragilis" was applied in cultivation to plants now recognized as either S. × fragilis, S. alba or S. euxina. One cultivar identified as S. euxina is 'Bullata', popular as an ornamental tree in Europe. It has a short trunk and a very dense globe-shaped crown.
