= Forest stands in Białowieża Forest =

Old-growth forest in North European Plain

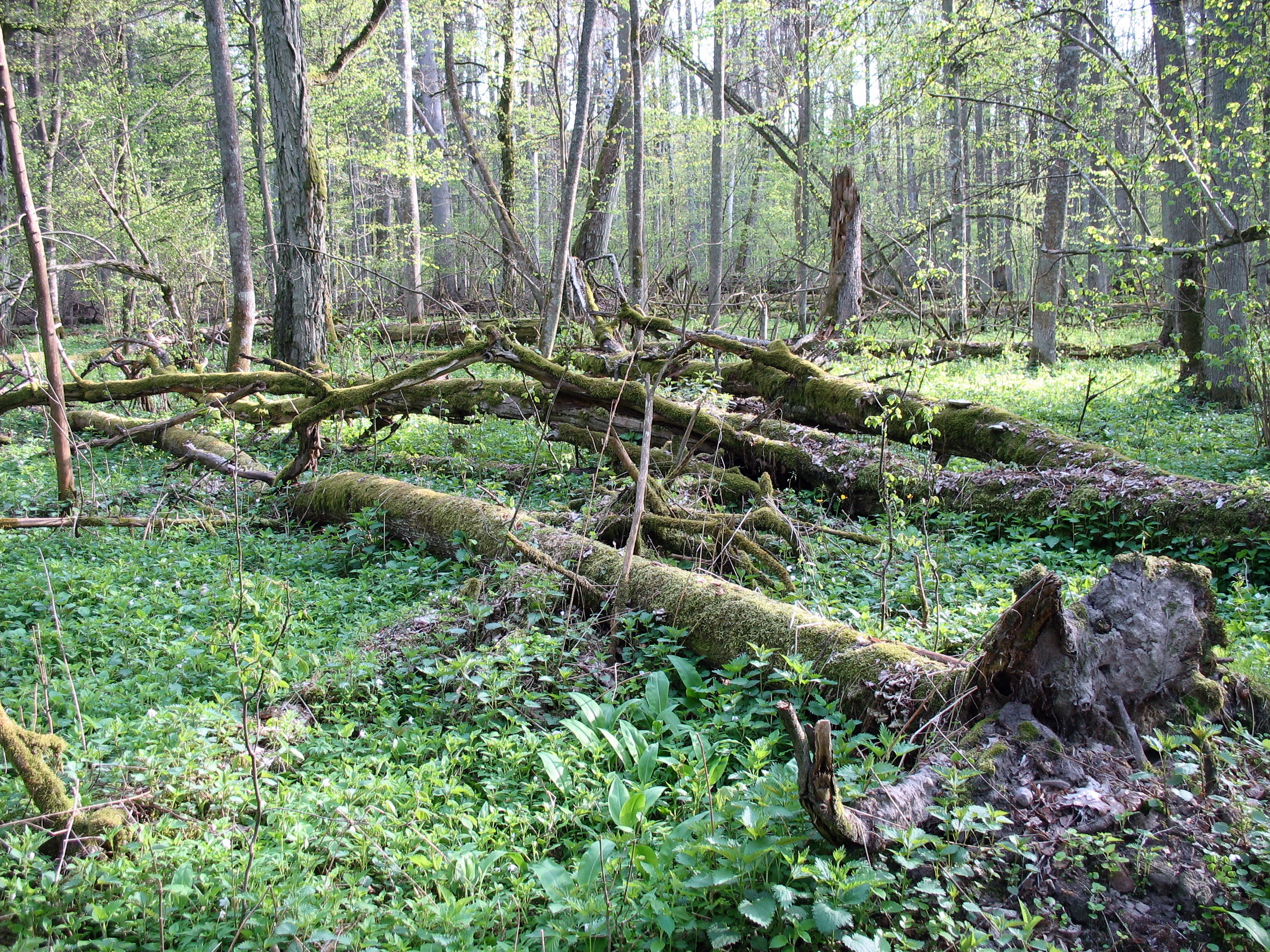
Nature reserve of the Białowieża National Park

The Białowieża Forest contains the last remnants of old-growth forests in the North European Plain. The forest is predominantly composed of deciduous and mixed forests. A notable trend observed in the Białowieża National Park is the decline of Scots pine in favor of deciduous species.

The forest is home to 26 species of trees, excluding those cultivated by humans in parks. Among these, the pedunculate oak stands out for its size and age, while the tallest tree in the forest is a spruce. However, the yew has disappeared from the forest, and the European silver fir is considered a threatened species. Conversely, human activity has introduced new tree species to the area.

The forest stands in Białowieża Forest form extensive tracts of natural woodland, exhibiting significant species diversity depending on the habitat. Human intervention and forestry demands have historically altered the proportions of certain species. Monospecific stands, mainly found in coniferous forests, are the result of afforestation efforts during the interwar and post-war periods.

Calls for the protection of the forest arose almost simultaneously with the onset of its industrial exploitation. The first nature reserves were established in 1921. The Białowieża National Park was created in an area that was never subjected to industrial exploitation, with minimal human impact throughout its history.

== Natural history of the Białowieża Forest ==
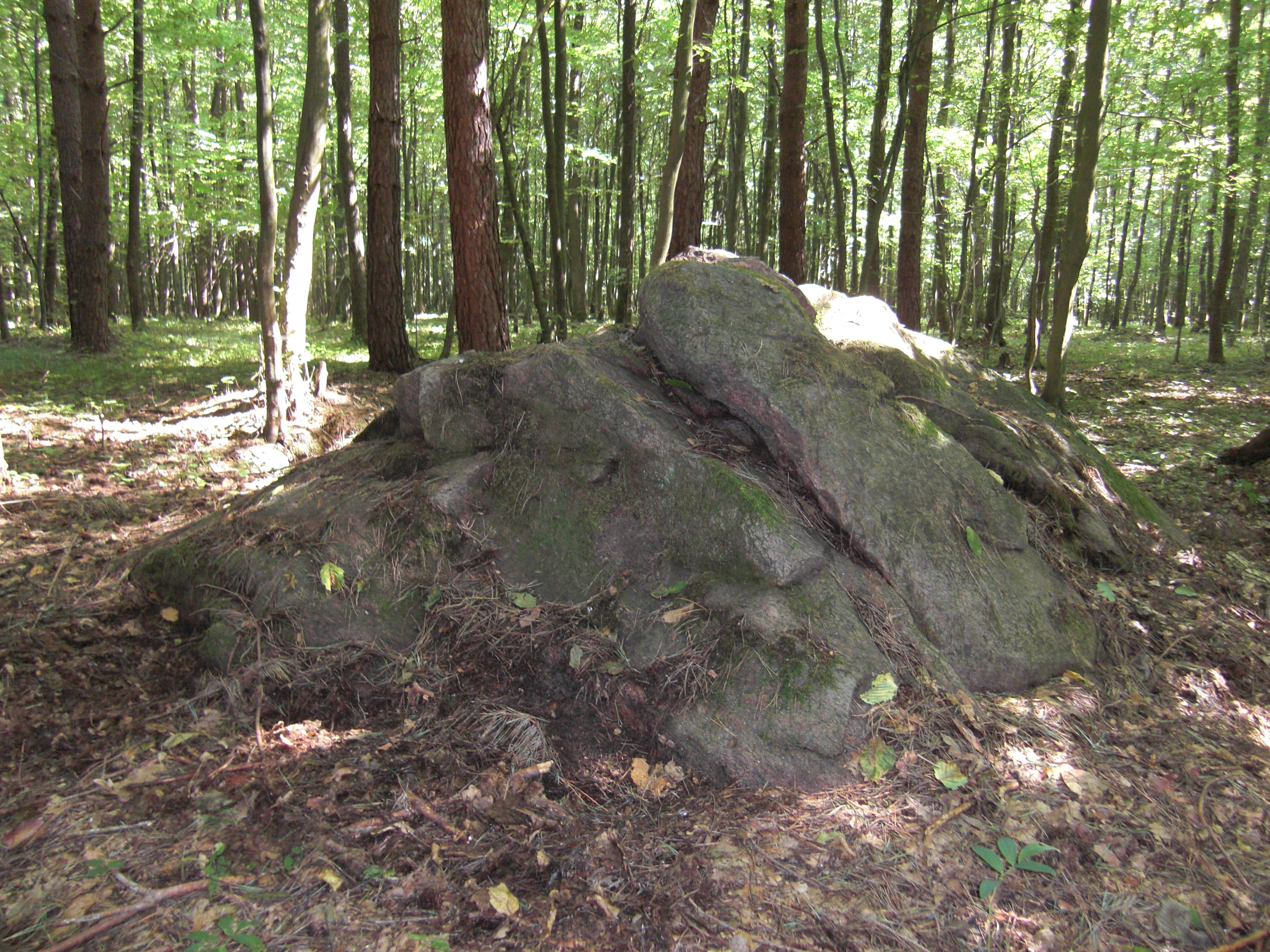
Erratic boulder in compartment 178B, a remnant of the last glaciation

The flora currently found in the Białowieża Forest gradually developed as a result of plant migration from unglaciated areas, influenced by climatic changes and the formation and transformation of soils. Initially, plants arrived from the south and west, later from the north and east. Heavy-seeded tree species (oak, linden, hornbeam) were unable to colonize treeless areas and could only appear once light-seeded species (birch, pine, aspen) had already forested the area, creating the right ecoclimate and soil conditions for more demanding species. The seeds of these trees were carried by birds.

It is estimated that during the period of partial climatic warming (10–9 thousand years ago), pine-birch forests appeared in the area that is now the Białowieża Forest. Pine was the dominant species, with birch as a secondary species. Alder appeared rarely along river alluvium, and by the middle of this period, the first spruces and hazels emerged.

The pine-birch forests later retreated due to a cooling climate during the Younger Dryas (9000–8250 BCE). These changes mainly involved a reduction in forest area and a significant increase in the role of birches and herbaceous plant communities dominated by true sedges.

Pine-birch forests returned during the Preboreal period (8250–6750 BCE), giving rise to the forest formations in the geographical area now known as the Białowieża Forest. Birch was the dominant species, but its dominance was short-lived. Gradually, hornbeam, elm, and linden appeared, along with hazel, forming the beginnings of mixed forests. This led to the retreat of pine-birch forests. Later, during the Boreal period (6750–5500 BCE), the role of birch diminished while pine spread extensively during the Holocene. Maple appeared during the Boreal period, and spruce arrived during the Subboreal period, around 2500–500 BCE. The current forest types were formed around 500 BCE.

During the Atlantic period (5500–2500 BCE), the proportion of deciduous forests increased. In the Subboreal period (2500–500 BCE), the climate cooled and became more humid. The proportion of pine and mixed forests likely remained unchanged, but spruce joined their composition, and the role of oak slightly increased. During the Subatlantic period (500 BCE–60 CE), the proportion of elm, oak, and linden decreased, and hazel significantly declined in the forest understory. Additionally, the role of alder decreased due to the lowering of groundwater levels. The cooling climate favored the spread of spruce.

The final stage of the formation of the Białowieża Forest's flora involved not so much the migration of new species, but rather the partial or complete extinction of warm-loving species. As spruce and the forest floor vegetation, which thrives in cooler temperatures, spread, the flora became impoverished.

== Current forest types ==
=== Classification ===
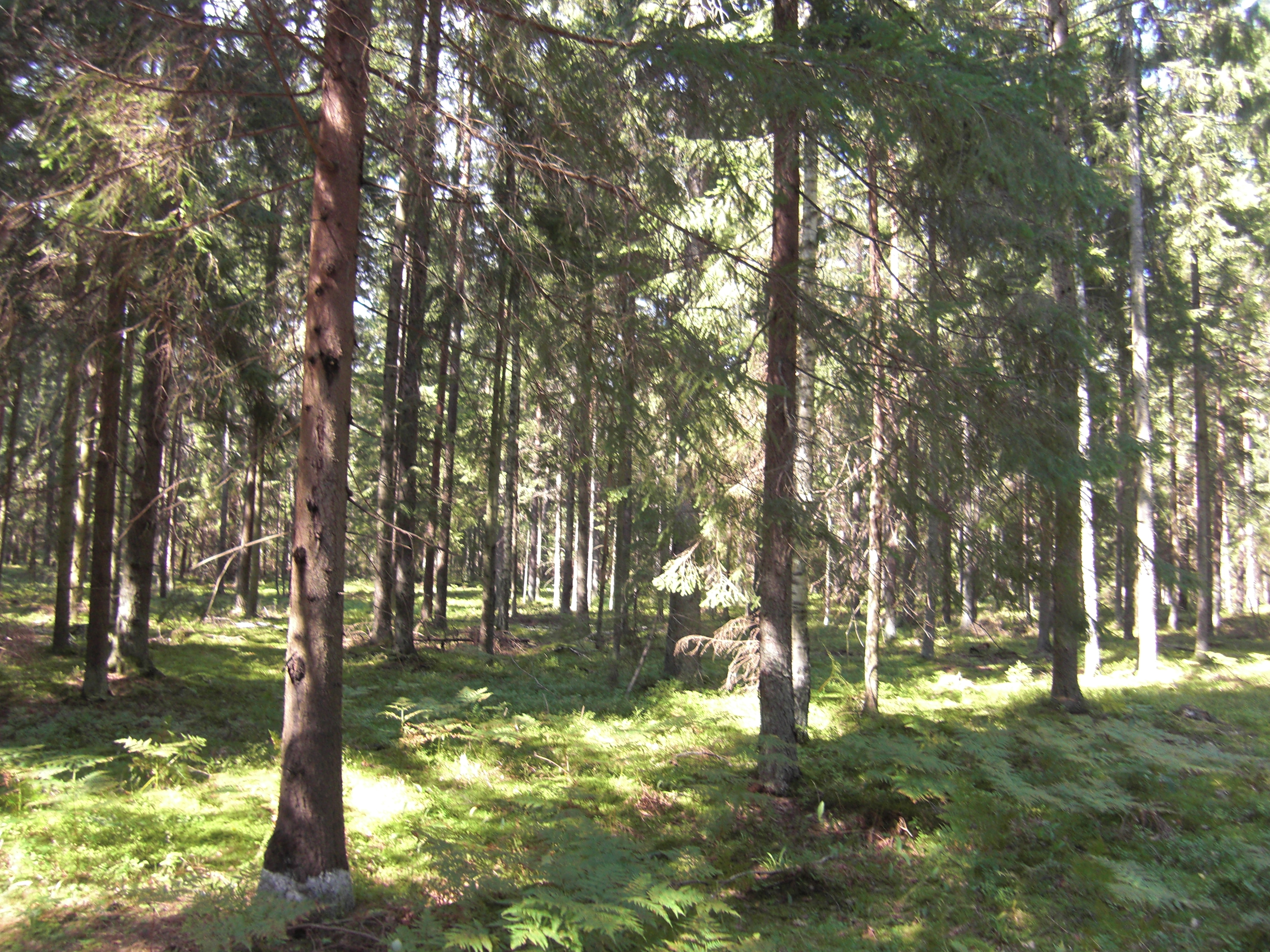
Coniferous forest

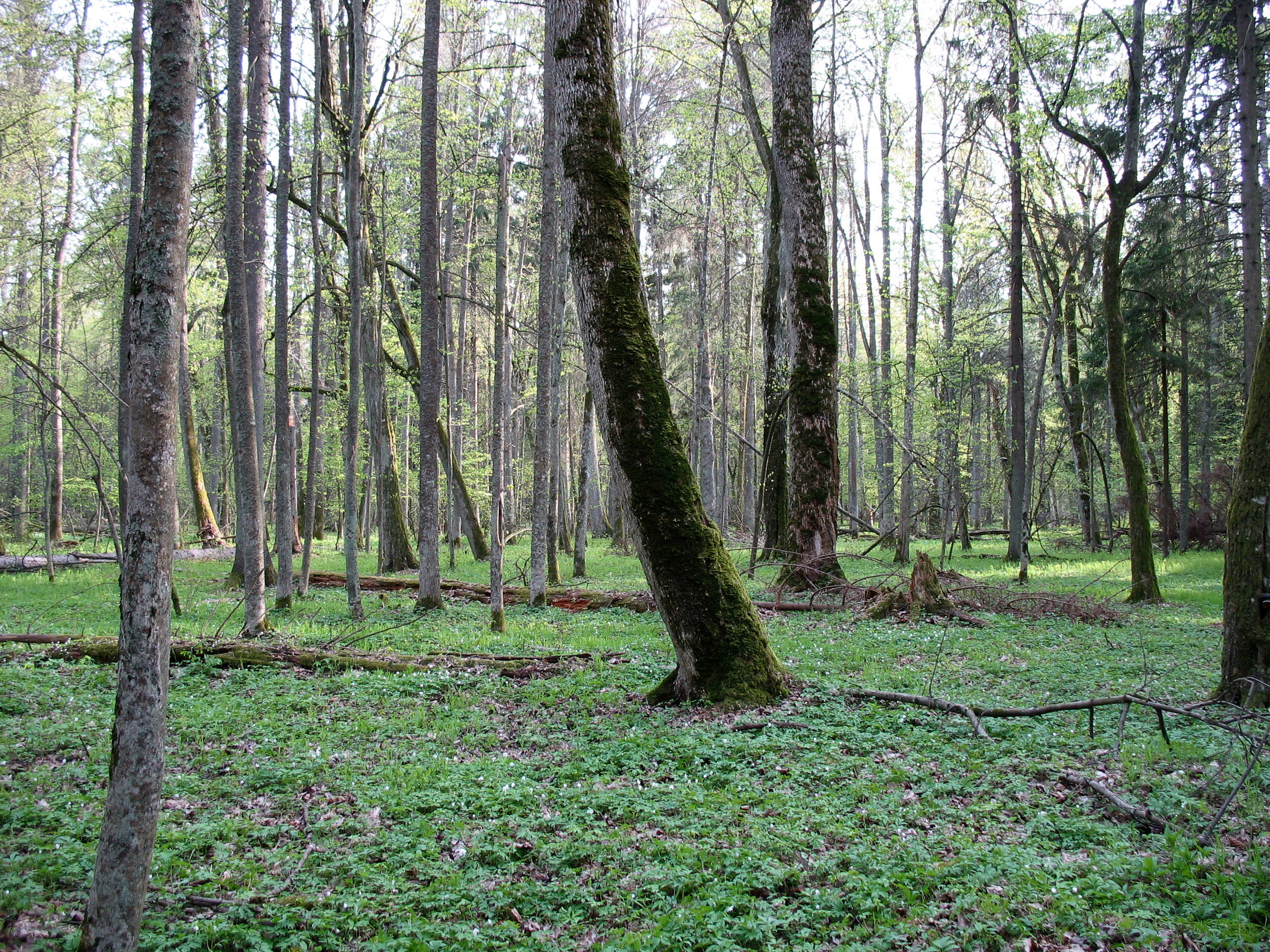
Highland hornbeam forest

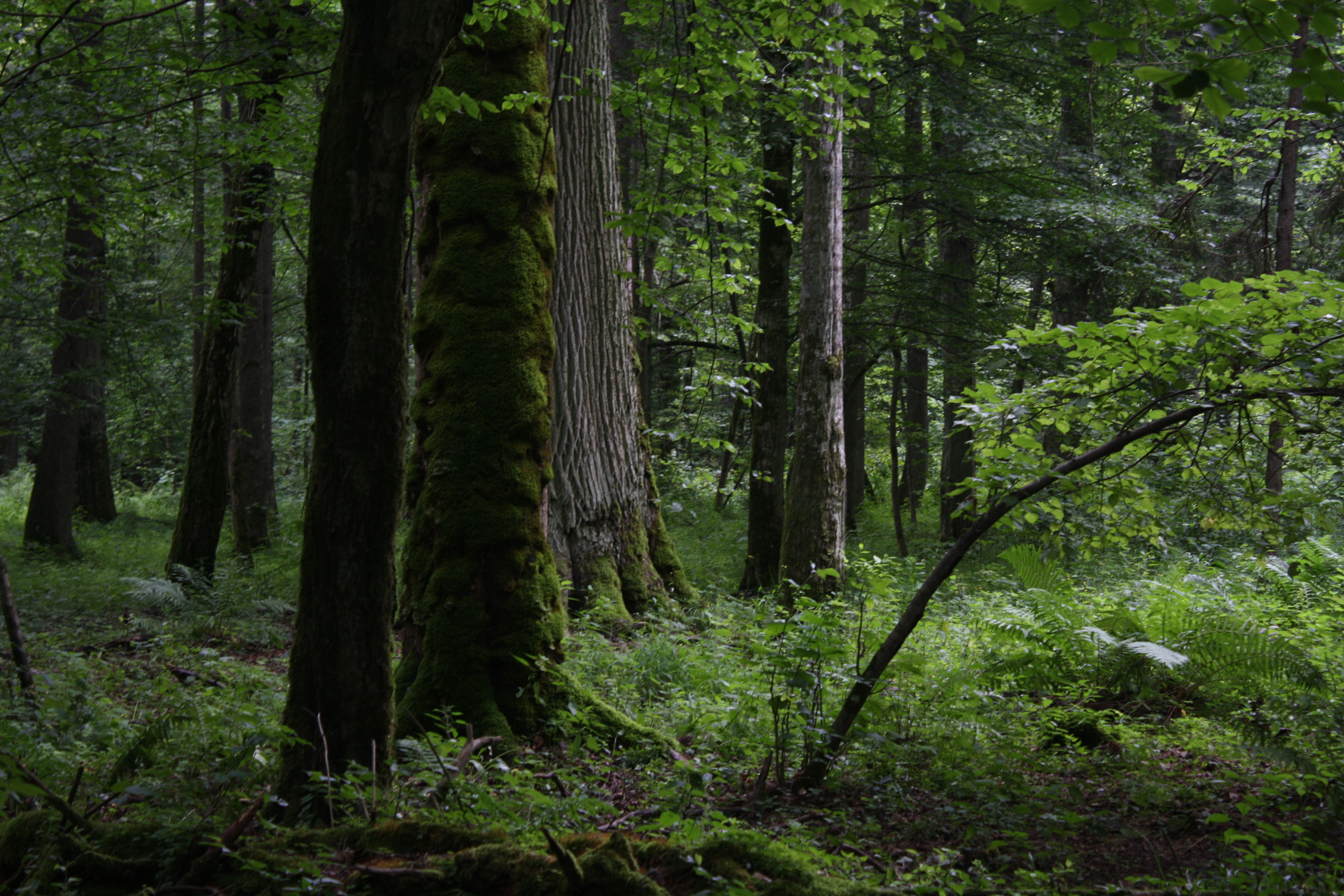
Lowland hornbeam forest

Various types of forests have been distinguished in the Białowieża Forest. In 1559, G.B. Wołowicz used the terms grud, oles, jełosmycz, bór ljago, and bór bagno to describe different forest types. These terms had long been used by the local population. The term grud (now grąd) referred to deciduous forests dominated by hornbeam, maple, elm, and linden. The term jełosmycz referred to spruce forests, oles to forests with a predominance of alder and ash, bór ljago to pine forests, and bór bagno to coniferous swamps.

Jan Jerzy Karpiński identified seven forest types in the Białowieża Forest: pine forest, pine-spruce forest (or coniferous forest), pine-spruce-oak forest (or mixed forest), coniferous swamp, fresh deciduous forest (or highland hornbeam forest), moist deciduous forest (or lowland hornbeam forest), and alder-ash forest (or alder carr). In the managed part of the forest, human activity has altered the natural proportions between forest types, though these have remained largely intact within the Białowieża National Park. Additionally, this depends on soil fertility. The dominance of deciduous trees stems from the fact that fertile habitats dominate in the central part of the forest.

Janusz Bogdan Faliński proposed a different classification based on four classes of forest communities:

- Deciduous and mixed forests
- Coniferous forests, i.e., pine forests
- Wetland forests and thickets, i.e., alder carrs
- Willow riparian forests (Łęgi Wierzbiowe)

According to Faliński, the Białowieża Forest is primarily made up of hornbeam forests and mixed pine forests. Hornbeam forests make up 47.2% of the managed part of the forest and 44.4% of the Białowieża National Park, while mixed pine forests make up 26.5% of the managed area and 20.4% of the Białowieża National Park.

=== Deciduous and mixed forests ===
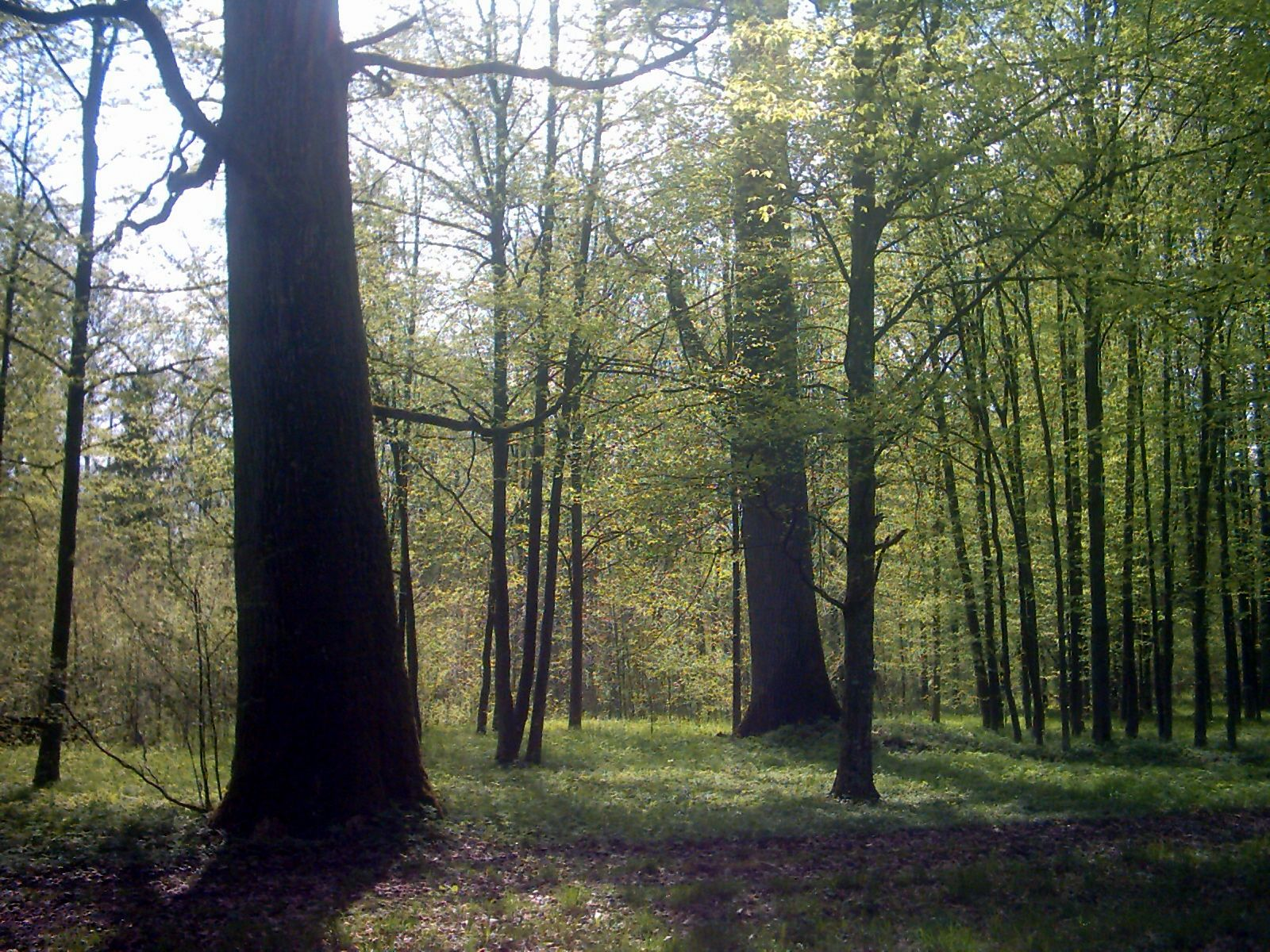
Light oak forest near the village of Budy

The hornbeam forest occurs in two variants: highland hornbeam forest and lowland hornbeam forest. The highland hornbeam forest (or fresh forest) occurs on clay soils with a linden admixture, covered with a thick layer of humus, with weak influence from groundwater. The tree stand background consists of oak and spruce, with linden, larch, aspen, maple, and hornbeam present as admixtures. The most common components of the groundcover are: wood sorrel, wall lettuce, common hepatica, greater stitchwort, bugle, common hemp-nettle, mountain melick, wood anemone, false lily of the valley, and finger sedge. The understory includes hazel, spindle, honeysuckle, buckthorn, dogwood, rowan, alpine currant, and elder. This forest type is widespread in the Polish part of the forest and in the Białowieża National Park.

Lowland hornbeam forest, also known as moist forest, grows on chalky deposits overlaid with fertile, moist sands and clays. Its canopy is less dense than the highland type, but it features larger hornbeams and more oak and linden. Elm, ash, common alder, downy birch, and aspen are occasional additions. The groundcover includes yellow archangel, sweet woodruff, greater stitchwort, wood sorrel, yellow loosestrife, Carex sylvatica, bugle, and lady fern. The understory contains alder buckthorn, elder, red elderberry, blackcurrant, Viburnum, bird cherry, dogwood, and spindle.

Hornbeam forests in Białowieża National Park's strict reserves are particularly stable due to minimal human interference. Species proportions shift naturally without any species showing signs of decline. These forests exhibit unification processes, potentially reflecting regeneration after past human pressures.

Light oak forest features a canopy dominated by pedunculate oak, with minor contributions from aspen, hornbeam, and linden. It has a park-like appearance with sunlight reaching the ground layer, supporting a richer and more diverse flora than other forest types. Warmth-loving plants more common in southern and eastern regions dominate, while the understory is sparse, including hazel, scattered hornbeam, and Euonymus verrucosus. The groundcover contains Potentilla alba, Ranunculus polyanthemos, wood cranesbill, yellow foxglove, peach-leaved bellflower, bristly bellflower, Kashubian vetch, narrow-leaved lungwort, mountain sedge, white swallow-wort, bastard balm, Lathyrus laevigatus, black pea, Dracocephalum ruyschiana, stemless carline thistle, and various clovers. The moss layer is sparse.

Some historical oak forests were replaced by settlements, such as the Palace Park in Białowieża, once the site of an oak forest, and nearby villages that replaced hornbeam forests. Gravel pits created during the 20th century further reduced the extent of these oak forests.

=== Coniferous forests ===
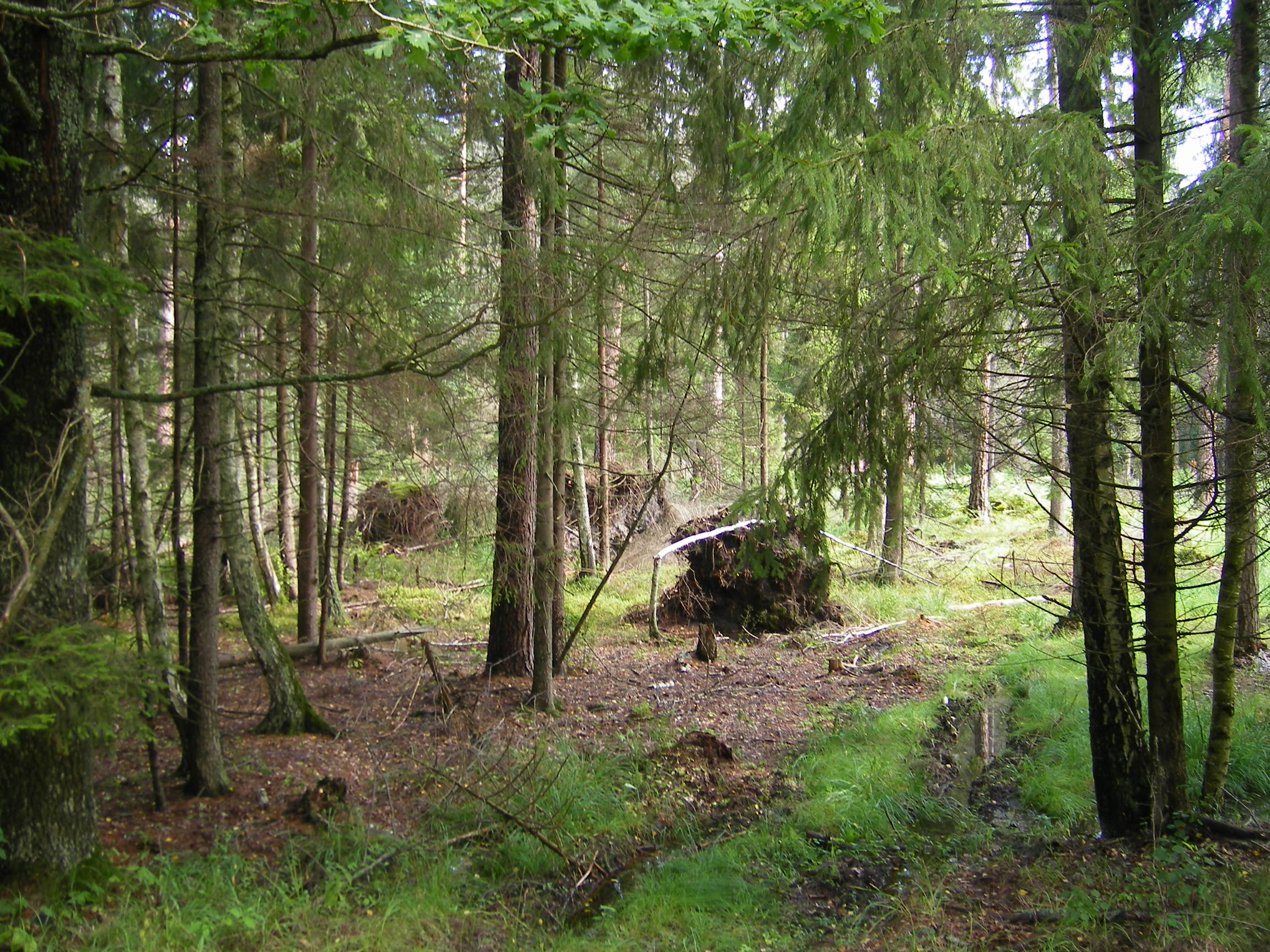
Coniferous forest, Belarusian part of the forest

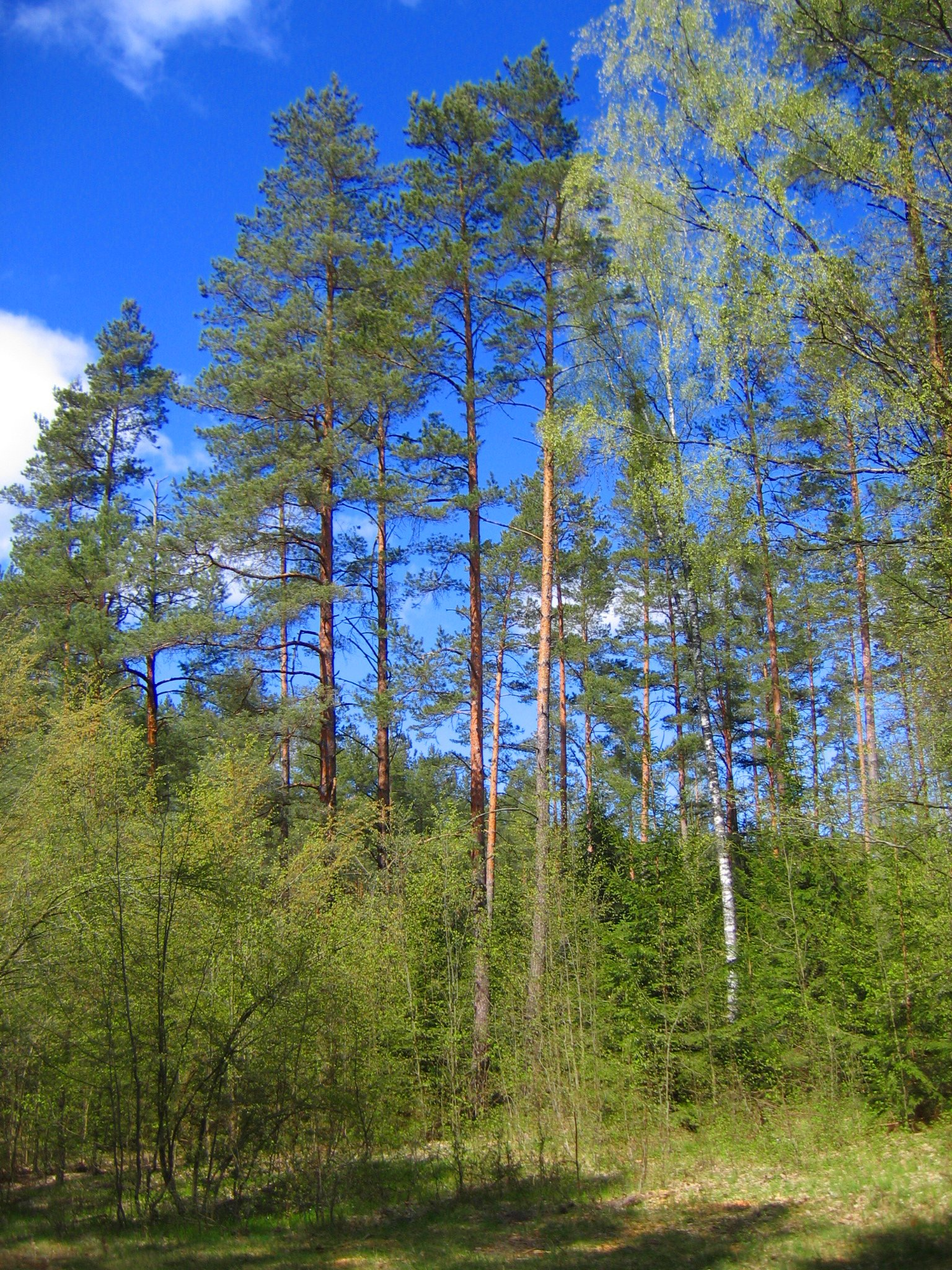
Mixed coniferous forest near Białowieża

Fresh coniferous forest occupies dry, fresh sands, with no significant influence from groundwater. The dominant tree is pine, with birch and spruce occurring as minor admixtures. Characteristic species in the groundcover include red-stemmed feathermoss, lingonberry, common heather, and broom forkmoss. The understory consists of juniper, rowan, and oak.

Moist coniferous forest occupies moist sands. The dominant trees are pine and spruce, with birch as a secondary species. The understory includes alder buckthorn, rowan, juniper, and shrubby willows. Characteristic groundcover species include European blueberry, red-stemmed feathermoss, lingonberry, Dicranum polysetum, and glittering woodmoss. Differentiating species compared to the fresh coniferous forest are bog bilberry, marsh Labrador tea, purple moor-grass, and flat-topped bogmoss.

Bog coniferous forest occurs in swampy depressions and hollows lacking water drainage. The terrain is hummocky, with hollows filled with water between the hummocks. It is dominated by stunted pine, with downy birch as a rare admixture. The role of downy birch is minimal. The understory is sparse and primarily consists of pine regenerating naturally in abundance, occasionally accompanied by downy birch and common sallow. The groundcover is species-poor and mosaic-like, comprising peat mosses, reed grass, cottongrass, cranberry, bogbean, and other plants typical of swampy peatlands. Among shrubs, shrubby birch, a glacial relict, occurs. Its seeds are not dispersed by the wind but are carried by water from melting snow during the early spring thaw.

Mixed coniferous forest occurs in relatively nutrient-poor habitats with acidic soils. Floristically and ecologically, it relates to both deciduous and coniferous forests. The dominant species is generally spruce, while pine, although consistently present, plays a minor quantitative role. Two types of mixed coniferous forests are distinguished: fresh mixed coniferous forest and moist mixed coniferous forest. The first type features deep or moderately deep groundwater and benefits from short periods of soil and rainwater. The second type occupies mineral soils under moderate or relatively strong influence from groundwater or soil and rainwater. Fresh mixed coniferous forest is formed by pine and spruce, with oak, larch, and birch as admixtures. The understory consists of juniper, rowan, honeysuckle, hazel, buckthorn, and spindle. The groundcover is diverse, with frequent components including European blueberry, red-stemmed feathermoss, glittering woodmoss, chickweed-wintergreen, hairy wood-rush, and others.

The tree stands of moist mixed coniferous forest consist of spruce and pine, with oak, birch, and aspen as secondary species. The understory features buckthorn, shrubby willows, hazel, rowan, and juniper. The ground layer is mainly composed of European blueberry, purple moor-grass, sphagnum moss, chickweed-wintergreen, red-stemmed feathermoss, glittering woodmoss, hairy wood-rush, bog bilberry, and marsh Labrador tea.

=== Alder carrs ===
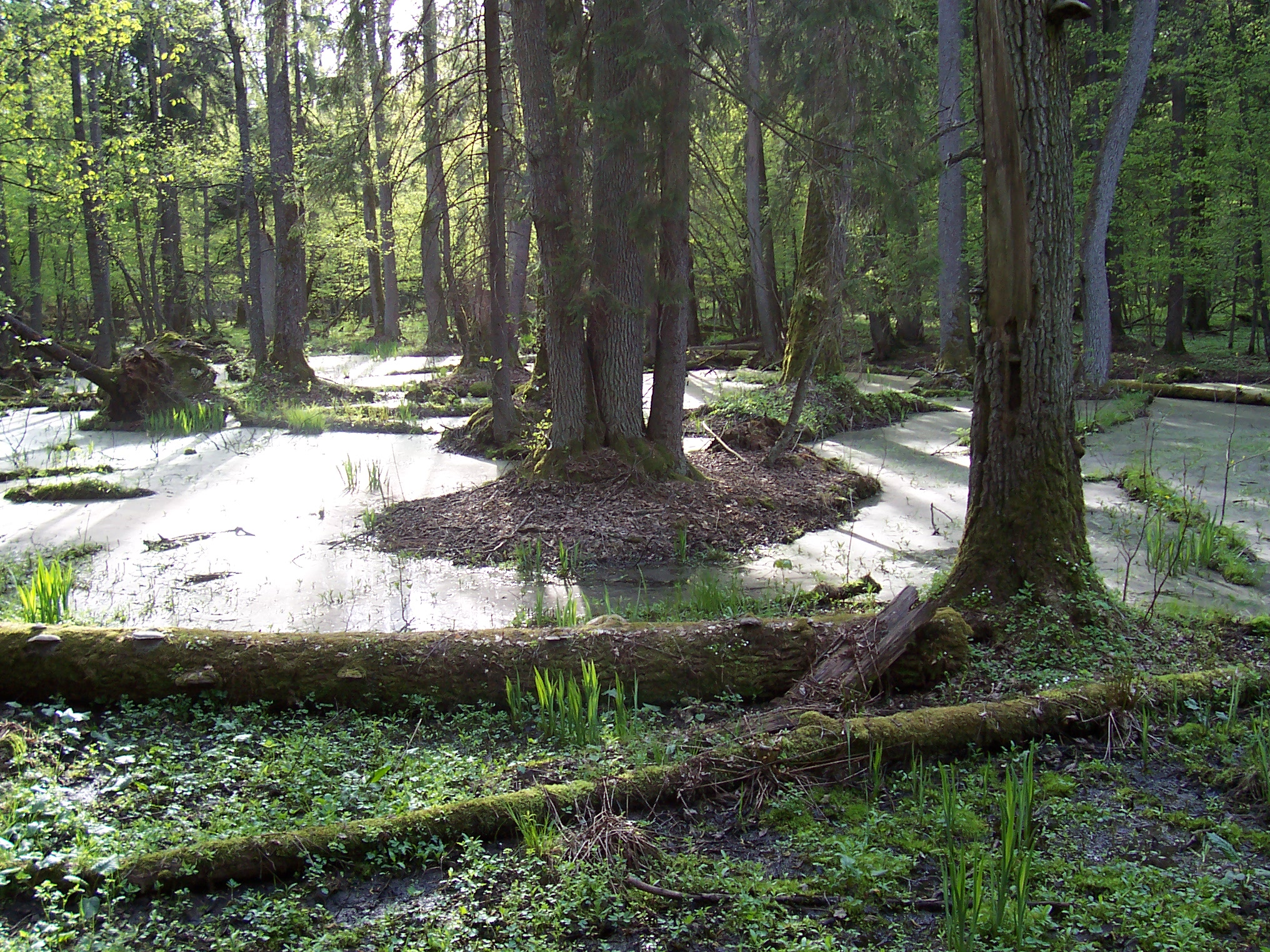
Alder carr in the strict reserve of BPN

Alder carrs occupy low areas with clay-sandy and clay-loamy deposits near rivers or on their former channels. These forests grow in water-flooded terrains and are generally difficult to access. This type of forest is primarily composed of black alder, along with spruce and ash. Birch and aspen appear individually as minor admixtures. The understory is made up of alder buckthorn, Viburnum, hazel, black currant, elder, rowan, bird cherry, and spindle. Frequently occurring groundcover species include marsh fern, purple small-reed, creeping buttercup, common nettle, wood avens, yellow loosestrife, moneywort, tufted loosestrife, lady fern, and common rush. Species differentiating it from the moist forest include meadowsweet, bittersweet, marsh-marigold, cabbage thistle, yellow flag, and others.

Ash-alder carrs are also distinguished, occupying fertile habitats rich in organic or organic-mineral compounds, usually with shallow groundwater levels, which periodically rise to the surface. The main species are ash and alder, with elm and birch present as admixtures. The understory includes buckthorn, hazel, black elder, black currant, and bird cherry. The groundcover features abundant common nettle, hedge woundwort, touch-me-not balsam, broad-leaved enchanter's nightshade, wood avens, dog's mercury, giant fescue, herb-robert, ground-ivy, and yellow archangel. Species differentiating it from alder carrs include common hop, alternate-leaved golden saxifrage, and valerian. Species differentiating it from the moist forest include meadowsweet, bittersweet, marsh-marigold, cabbage thistle, yellow flag, common skullcap, gypsywort, and large bitter-cress.

=== Willow riparian forests ===
Willow riparian forests are lush woodlands and thickets dominated by narrow-leaved willows. These forests grow on sandy alluvium in the valleys of larger forest rivers. The rivers in the forest are slow-flowing, their valleys are narrow, and their upper sections are marshy, creating unfavorable conditions for the development of riparian forests. Moreover, these forests were heavily exploited by humans in the 20th century. As a result, only fragments of riparian forests remain. Riparian forests can be found only on the peripheries of the Ladzka Forest in the Narew river valley. Along the Narewka river, downstream from Kosy Most, only small and scattered patches of willow forest have survived. The tree stand is composed of two species: eastern crack-willow and white willow.

== Tree and shrub species ==
The flora of forest trees includes 26 species: 21 deciduous tree species and 5 coniferous ones, along with 55 shrub species, 1 semi-shrub species, and 24 subshrub species. Among them, the pedunculate oak stands out for its height, shape, and age.

In the Białowieża Forest, the dominant species is Norway spruce (Picea abies), accounting for 31%, followed by Scots pine (Pinus sylvestris) – 20%, common alder (Alnus glutinosa) – 14%, pedunculate oak (Quercus robur) – 5%, European hornbeam (Carpinus betulus) – 5%, ash (Fraxinus excelsior) – 5%, silver birch (Betula pendula) – 2%, downy birch (Betula pubescens) – 1%, Norway maple (Acer platanoides) – 0.7%, sessile oak (Quercus petraea) – 0.5%, aspen (Populus tremula) – 0.5%, small-leaved linden (Tilia cordata) – 0.5%, and wych elm (Ulmus glabra) – 0.3%. Occasionally, European white elm (Ulmus laevis) and wild apple tree appear, while small trees include rowan (Sorbus aucuparia) and goat willow (Salix caprea). The flora lacks beech, large-leaved linden, and field maple.

The main creators of tree stands are Scots pine, European hornbeam, and black alder. Supporting species are Norway spruce and pedunculate oak, which can replace the main species if any are absent. Birch, aspen, and ash exhibit similar replacement abilities.

Norway spruce invades all environments, competing with pine, hornbeam, and alder. Birch also penetrates various habitats but is more sensitive to light scarcity and struggles to maintain its foothold. Hornbeam is aided in retaining its territories by Norway maple, small-leaved linden, and partly wych elm. Ash serves as a partner to black alder, while oak oscillates between pine and hornbeam. European hornbeam and black alder dominate the most fertile and non-acidic soils. Soil moisture levels, the mineral salt saturation of water, and water movement in the soil are key factors distinguishing the range of forest trees.

=== Spruce ===
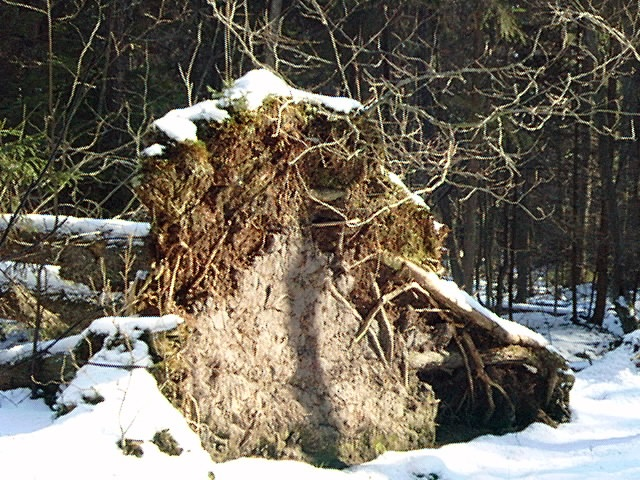
Spruce windthrow

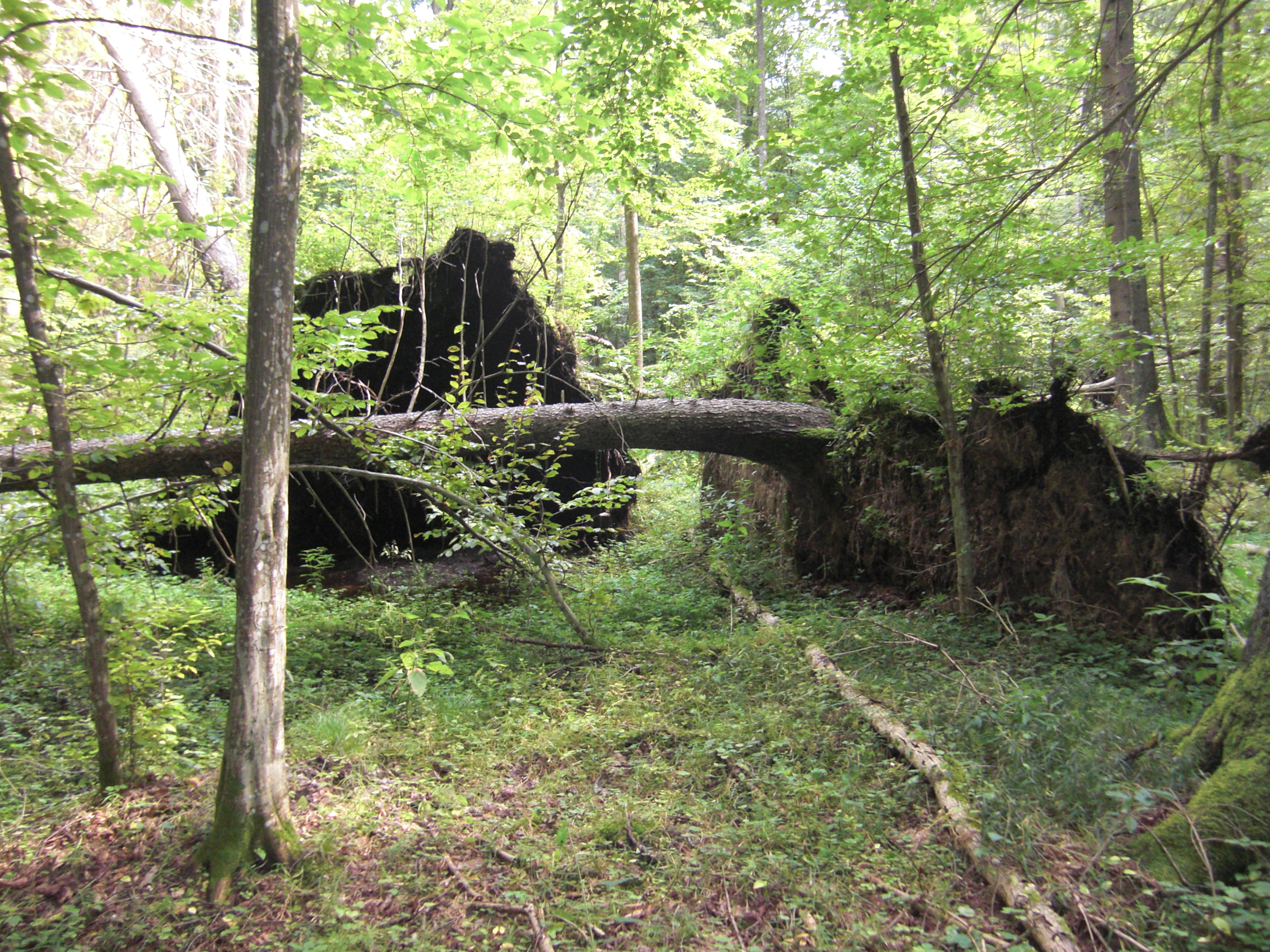
Spruce windthrows

Spruce likely arrived in the forest from the Central Russian refugium. Its spread and integration into most forest communities are linked to a cooling climate and occurred during the Subboreal period. At the time of this species' invasion, mixed hornbeam-oak type forests already existed in the Białowieża Forest, and spruce became a constant component of these ecosystems.

Spruce is a common tree throughout the Białowieża Forest, present almost everywhere. There is not even one square kilometer in the forest free from spruce (except for fields, meadows, and settlements). Only in the areas of the Białowieża National Park and the Browsk Forestry District is it less abundant. Generally, its presence is more frequent in the managed parts of the forest. Its prevalence and distribution result both from natural expansion and forestry practices. In forest complexes located south and southwest of the Białowieża Forest, the share of spruce sharply decreases, its role suddenly limited to a sporadic admixture. The closest dense spruce stands to the south of the forest are between 80 and 100 km away.

In hornbeam-oak forests, spruce surpasses all other trees in height. It grows over 50 meters tall, lives up to 300 years, and in the past was recorded as reaching 55 meters. Mature spruces rise above the canopy, a characteristic feature of the forest wall as seen from locations such as the Białowieża Glade or from outside the forest.

Due to its size and tendency to form shallow root systems, spruce is more prone to strong winds than other species, constituting the majority of uprooted trees. Spruce windthrows are one of the defining features of the Białowieża Forest's landscape. In hornbeam-oak forests, they are a primary factor (alongside hoofed mammals) shaping the forest floor and creating a mosaic of habitats. The depressions left by windthrows often become waterlogged and are utilized by wetland plants. Windthrows also cause soil profiles within the same unit to develop differing physical and chemical properties. Additionally, they provide shelter for animals.

Spruce can also reproduce vegetatively through its lower branches, which penetrate the soil, root, and produce vertical shoots. Over time, the branch decays, and the new shoot begins to grow independently. Spruce's abundant seeding also allows its seeds to land on rotting trunks and logs, where new spruces grow, a process described as saprophytism.

More than other species, spruce modifies the forest's microclimate. Snow cover beneath spruces is thinner but more persistent than under other trees. Less light reaches the ground under their crowns, significantly influencing the floristic composition of the understory.

In the strict reserve of the Białowieża National Park, spruce is slowly retreating, partly due to bark beetle infestations.

Spruce serves humans as construction and firewood material and is used for producing pulpwood and mining timbers. Its bark was once supplied to the tanning industry. Spruce is also cut for Christmas trees. In the 1970s, spruce accounted for over 40% of the total timber harvested from the Białowieża Forest.

=== Pine ===
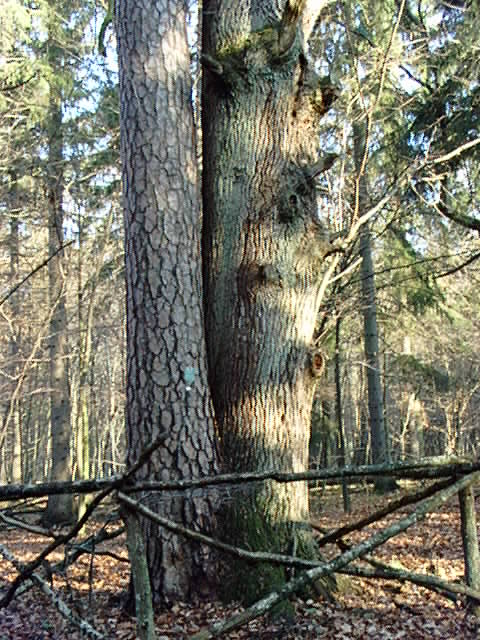
Natural monument in Szczekotowo

Pines, along with birches, were among the tree species that formed the initial forest community during the Preboreal period in the geographic area now occupied by the Białowieża Forest. Currently, pine independently forms stands in swampy coniferous forests and dry lichen woodlands – habitats that are challenging for spruce to colonize. Pine regenerates poorly in the conditions of the Białowieża National Park and is a declining species. In the past, the park provided more favorable conditions for pine.

The relationship between pine and spruce is dynamic and subject to constant change. One of the factors driving this change is fire, whether caused by lightning or humans. With its deeper root system, pine has a greater chance of surviving fire. However, if pine succumbs to fire, spruce, due to its quicker natural regeneration, rapidly occupies the vacated space. Additionally, the extensive planting of pine by humans in the 20th century influenced this relationship. Monoculture plantations of pine led to the proliferation of certain pests, such as moths like the pine beauty, black arches, and pine-tree lappet. There is an ongoing decline of Scots pine within the Białowieża National Park, as broadleaf species encroach upon areas previously occupied by pine. At the beginning of the 20th century, pine was one of the few species, alongside the wych elm, that had smaller dimensions than at the time of the park's establishment. In pine forests, it is not pine that regenerates, but spruce or other species. Although numerous seedlings and saplings appear in certain areas of the park, they usually die after a few years.

Pine can live up to 350 years and has long been valued as a building material. It was historically used as timber for shipbuilding. Pines were floated down the Narewka and Narew rivers to the Vistula and then transported further. Mast pines were sold to Western Europe. In the 1970s, pine accounted for approximately 25% of all timber supplied to the national economy by the Białowieża Forest. However, the 20th century saw a decline in pine resources compared to the 19th century.

=== Fir and yew ===
Fir and yew have always been rare in the Białowieża Forest. Yew occurred in only one location, where it eventually disappeared, while fir is found in two locations and is considered an endangered species.

Yew had its habitat in the western part of the forest, in the Nieznanowo reserve within the former Leśniańska Guard area. In 1887 and 1893, it consisted of only two shrubs. The last person to see it was likely N.K. Genko in 1902, who pinpointed its location in sections 489 and 517. German botanists failed to find the yew during World War I. Shortly after the war, Polish botanist Józef Paczoski also searched for it without success, as did later efforts by other Polish botanists. The reason for the disappearance of this species is unknown. According to Genko's description, local residents destroyed the yew, believing it to be a remedy for rabies.

Fir has long been known to grow in the eastern part of the forest, in the Cisówka reserve (section 562, within the Belarusian part of the forest). It occurs there as several dozen young trees growing on a mineral island, a slight elevation, surrounded by the swamps of Dziki Nikor, which were drained during the Soviet era. The second location was discovered in 1923 in the Hubar reserve (section 738), south of Białowieża, also within the Belarusian part of the forest. According to a description by Jan Klosko, a single tree with a trunk diameter of 37.5 cm and a height of 22 m grew there, estimated to be 70 years old. Additionally, there were three saplings aged five, seven, and ten years, along with dozens of two- and three-year-old seedlings. In 1923, the largest fir tree in the Cisówka reserve was felled by wind, and in 1928, the largest tree in the Hubar reserve was mistakenly cut down.

Due to the distance from the nearest contiguous range of firs (240 km in Roztocze and 170 km in the South Podlasie Lowland), it was once suggested that fir's presence in the forest was not natural but rather introduced by humans. However, palynological studies have shown that fir pollen has been present in peat bog sediments since the Boreal period.

=== Juniper ===
Juniper typically occurs in the forest as a shrub, not very common, and its presence is largely associated with human activity. Naturally, juniper is found primarily in the understory of dry pine forests on sand dunes, of which there are few in the Polish part of the forest. Its occurrence and spread in other pine forests result from thinning of the forest canopy due to exploitative tree cutting. Such exploitative cutting generally occurred on the peripheries of the forest. On the outskirts, juniper also invades other types of forests due to habitat degradation and destruction of the underbrush. Systematic grazing of cattle in the forest in the past led to the elimination of shrub and herbaceous plants, which contributed to the spread of juniper, which can sometimes even be found in wet conditions, such as in riparian forests and alder carrs.

Individual specimens growing on the northern outskirts of the forest can reach up to 8 meters in height and have a tree-like form.

=== Oak ===
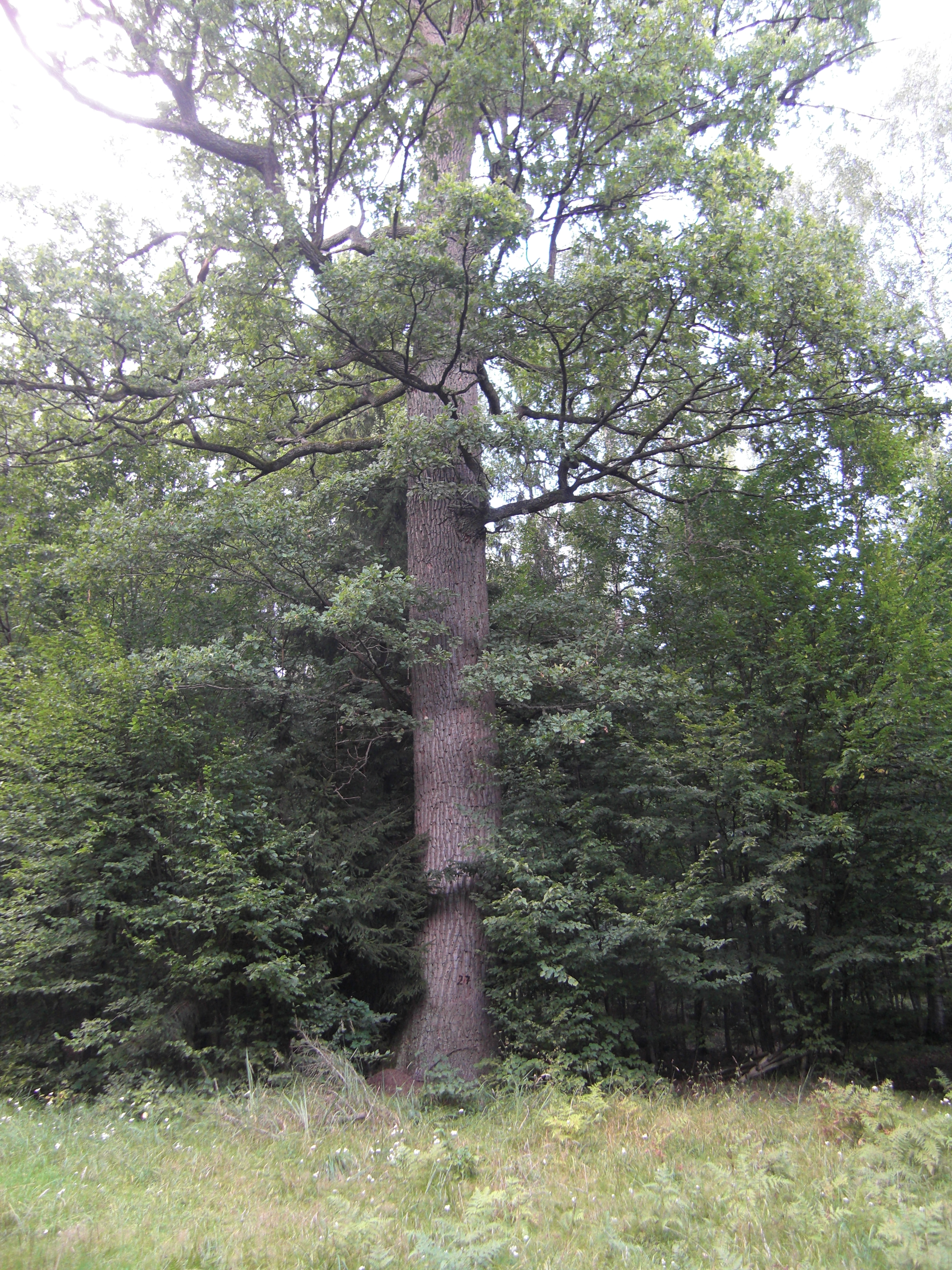
The site of the former clearing; the roadside oak is the only remnant of the previous forest stand

The oak appeared in the forest around 9,000 years ago, during the Boreal period. As the climate warmed and cooled, the role of the oak fluctuated. Ultimately, its presence stabilized around 500 BCE. Currently, there are two species of oak – the pedunculate oak and the sessile oak. The pedunculate oak has fruits on long stalks, while the sessile oak has very short stalks, giving the impression of no stalks. The leaves of the pedunculate oak have a lobed base, whereas those of the sessile oak have a wedge-shaped base. The leaf venation of the pedunculate oak is dense, while that of the sessile oak is sparse, and the leaf shape is more regular. Additionally, the bark of the pedunculate oak is thick and cracked, with deep vertical ridges, while the bark of the sessile oak is smoother. The pedunculate oak is the more widespread species, occurring in two varieties, with one variety having earlier developing leaves and the other later developing leaves.

The pedunculate oak is found in deciduous and mixed forests, being the main component of light oak forests, and in ash forests, it occurs alongside spruce and linden. The largest specimens are found in lowland oak forests, where oaks can reach up to 43 meters in height, with a diameter of 2.5 meters, and live for 400–500 years. Oak regeneration is not frequent, but due to its longevity, there is no indication that it is under threat.

The Białowieża Forest is located in the geographical center of the natural range of the pedunculate oak, and therefore its presence in the forest is not extraordinary. However, it lies on the northeastern edge of the natural range of the sessile oak. The largest occurrence of sessile oak is found in the Belarusian part of the forest, south of Białowieża. In the Polish part of the forest, larger concentrations are found in the Hajnówka Forest District, where a significant portion is protected in the Lipiny Reserve.

The thickness of oak trunks has always been of interest. Between 1916 and 1939, around 10 million m³ of wood was cut from the forest, with about half of it being oak. This means approximately 200,000 large oaks were felled. By the 1970s, oaks contributed only 11% of the total wood harvested in the forest, not due to decreased demand, but because the resources of the forest had been depleted. The forestry practices of the 20th century led to a disproportionate number of monumental oaks in the strict reserve compared to the managed part of the Polish Białowieża Forest.

=== Linden, maple, and hornbeam ===
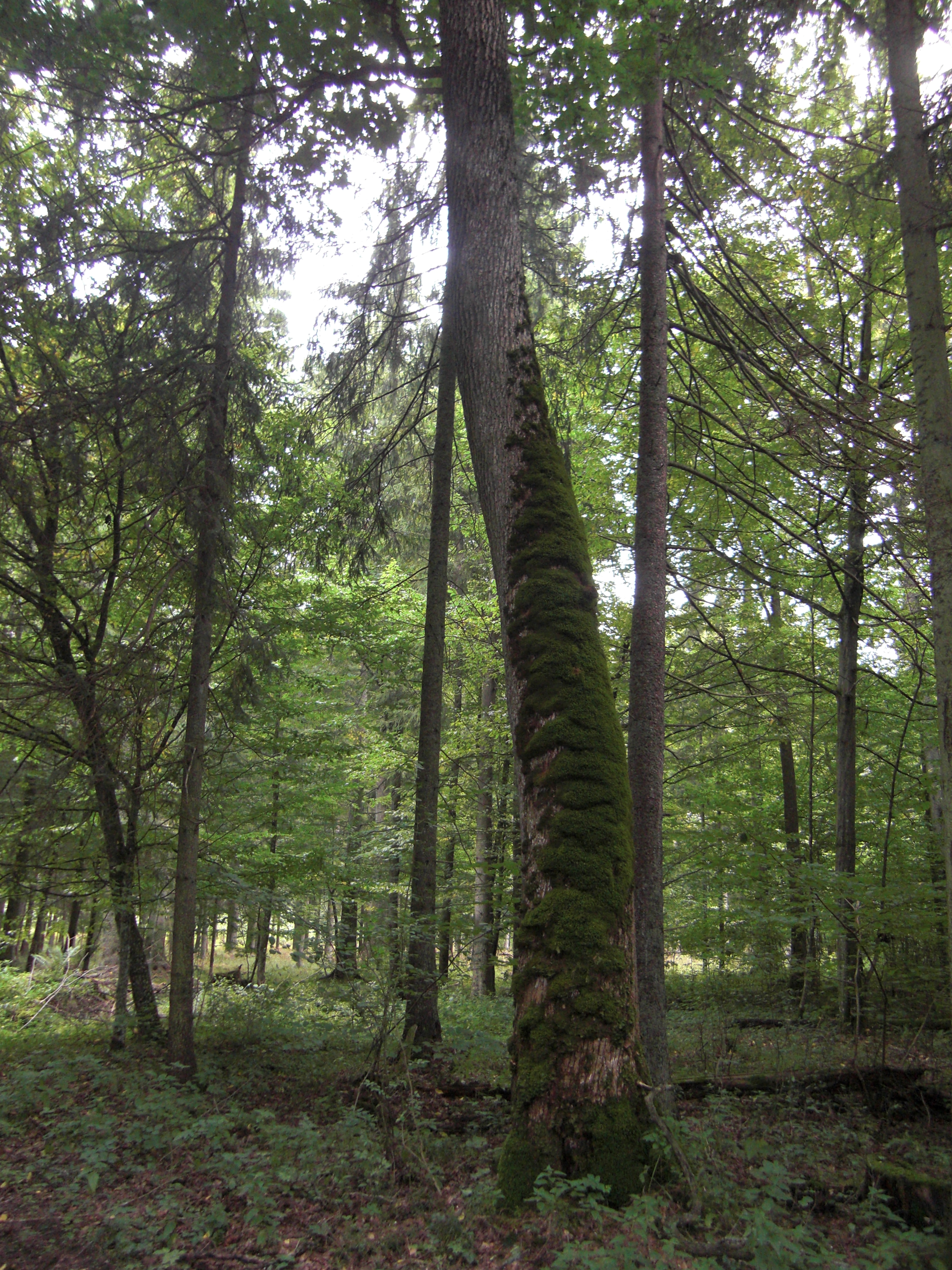
Maple in stand 216B

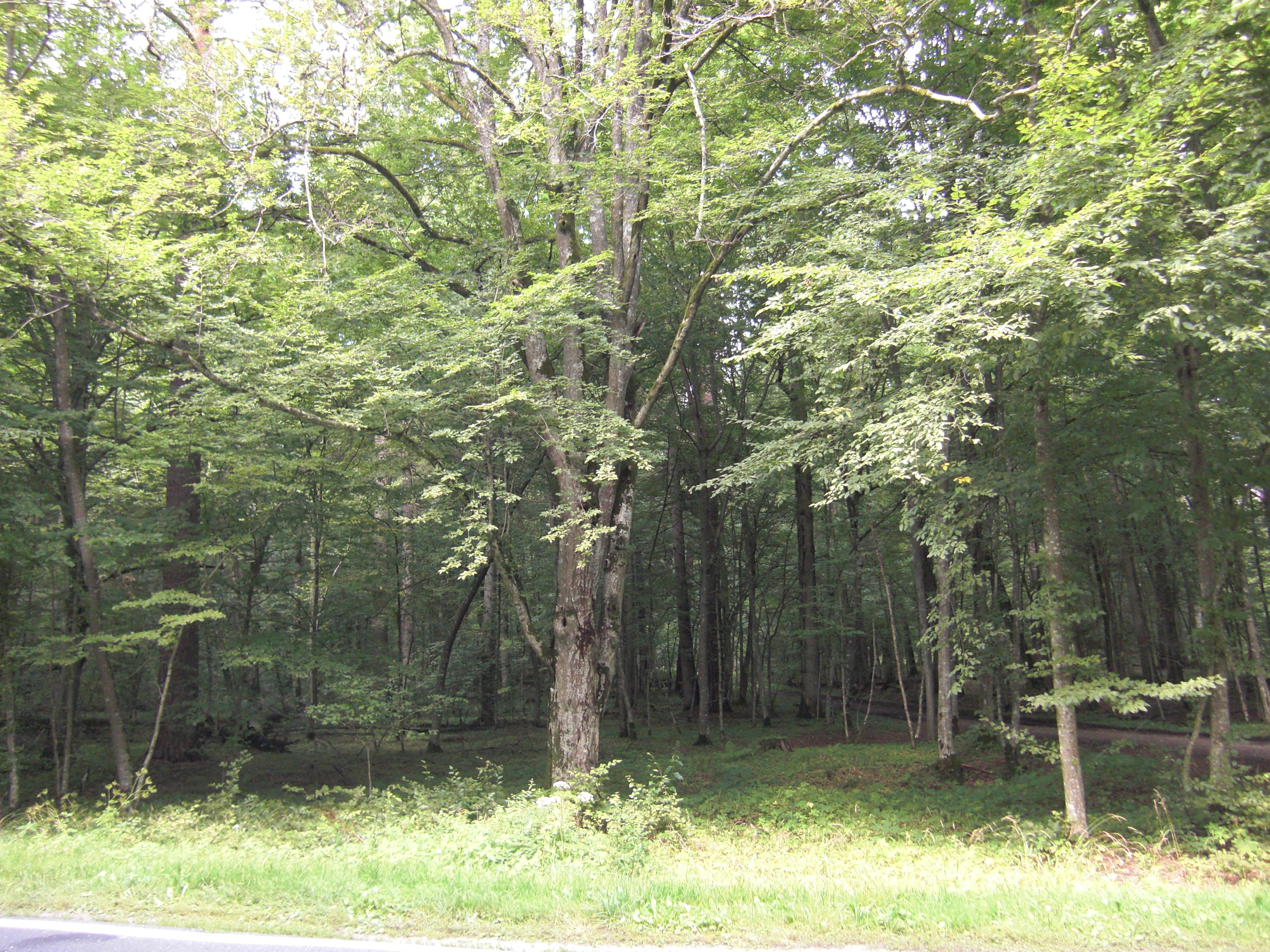
Hornbeam, landscape reserve

Linden, maple, and hornbeam typically occur together and form the most widespread type of mixed forest in the Białowieża Forest, specifically in the ash and maple forests. Apart from these forests, these species are rare and typically found as admixtures in mixed pine forests and alder-ash forests. Occasionally, they can appear as undergrowth in other forest communities. The large-leaved linden does not occur naturally in the forest, nor does the sycamore or field maple. The large-leaved linden is found in the Palace Park in Białowieża, where it was planted at the end of the 19th century, and younger generations of this species grow on research plots at a geobotanical station.

Historically, linden appeared first in the forest, followed by hornbeam and then maple. These species emerged during the Boreal period. At that time, linden played a significant role, forming warm-loving mixed forests along with oak and elm. Hornbeam became a dominant forest component during the Atlantic period. Maple is a constant part of the canopy in ash and maple forests but has never played a significant role in the Białowieża Forest.

For unclear reasons, linden does not occur in the northern part of the forest, even though favorable habitats are present. It has been suggested that human activity may explain this absence.

Humans have long utilized linden for economic purposes, stripping its bark for the production of shoes, ropes, and mats. Properly prepared bark was used for roofing. Linden flowers were harvested as a medicine, and linden honey is still considered one of the best bee products. The soft wood of linden, due to its workability, is highly prized in woodworking, especially for carving.

The reduction of linden in the forest has been driven by intensive game farming and livestock grazing. The conversion of the forest into a game reserve at the turn of the 19th and 20th centuries caused significant damage to young oak and linden trees. As a result, linden trees from that period, born during the overabundance of game, were eaten before they could grow into mature trees. In the 20th century, the share of linden decreased due to excessive exploitation, but in recent years, there has been a resurgence of linden trees in the forest, primarily in the Białowieża National Park, through both generative and vegetative regeneration. Although vegetative shoots are vulnerable to being eaten by animals, vegetative regeneration allows the linden to persist in the same location for hundreds or even thousands of years. Most of the old linden trees in the Białowieża National Park have one to several woody shoots. When an old linden tree is felled, one of its shoots typically fills the gap.

Old, monumental linden trees have expanded bases and deeply cracked bark, resembling that of oak, which is quite different from the smooth bark of young linden trees. The epiphytic vegetation growing on their bark also differs between old and young trees. Occasionally, tourists mistake old linden trees for oaks. No other forest tree in the Białowieża Forest has such an elaborate structure and provides as many habitats for other organisms as the linden, with its expanded base, often gnarled trunk, deeply sculpted bark, and developed canopy.

Hornbeam is a main structural component of the ash-maple forests. It is smaller than other forest trees but develops the widest crowns, thus blocking light and hindering regeneration of other species. Hornbeam is deeply rooted and resistant to strong winds. Young hornbeams, if exposed to unfavorable conditions, can remain in the form of undergrowth for many years. These trees have a chance to grow when a gap appears in the canopy.

Linden can grow up to 42 meters in height with a trunk diameter of 2 meters; maple reaches 37 meters and 1 meter in diameter; hornbeam reaches 30 meters in height and 1 meter in diameter. It is generally stated that the maximum age of linden trees in the Białowieża Forest is between 250 and 300 years. However, the trunks of these trees are hollow, and the number of growth rings cannot be counted. The maximum age of maple and hornbeam is estimated to be between 150 and 200 years, while hornbeam can live up to 300 years.

Hornbeam wood is not of particular interest to foresters, and the logging of oak, linden, and other species has contributed to the spread of hornbeam in recent times.

=== Elm ===
Elms are among the rarest tree species in the Białowieża Forest. Three tree species of elm can be found: wych elm, European white elm, and field elm. Of these, the wych elm is the most common. All three species are associated with moist, fertile habitats, and they occur exclusively in lowland ash forests and alder carrs.

Elms appeared in the Białowieża Forest at the end of the Preboreal period, and by the Boreal period (6750–5500 BC), they played an important role alongside oak and linden in warm-temperate deciduous forests. Over subsequent periods, the prevalence of elm gradually decreased. In modern times, forest management practices have contributed to the depletion of elm trees. In the past, there was a dense stand of field elms along the Przedzielna river.

Elm wood provides a hard, valuable raw material used for making veneers. In the 1970s, it accounted for less than 1% of the total volume of wood harvested in the forest.

The wych elm reaches 37 meters in height and 150 centimeters in diameter. Both the field elm and European white elm grow to about 30 meters in height, with a diameter not exceeding 80 centimeters.

The Białowieża Forest also hosts a shrub-like species of elm, the Siberian elm, found on the edge of the Narewka river valley near the village of Gruszki, alongside other warm-loving plants.

=== Ash and alder ===
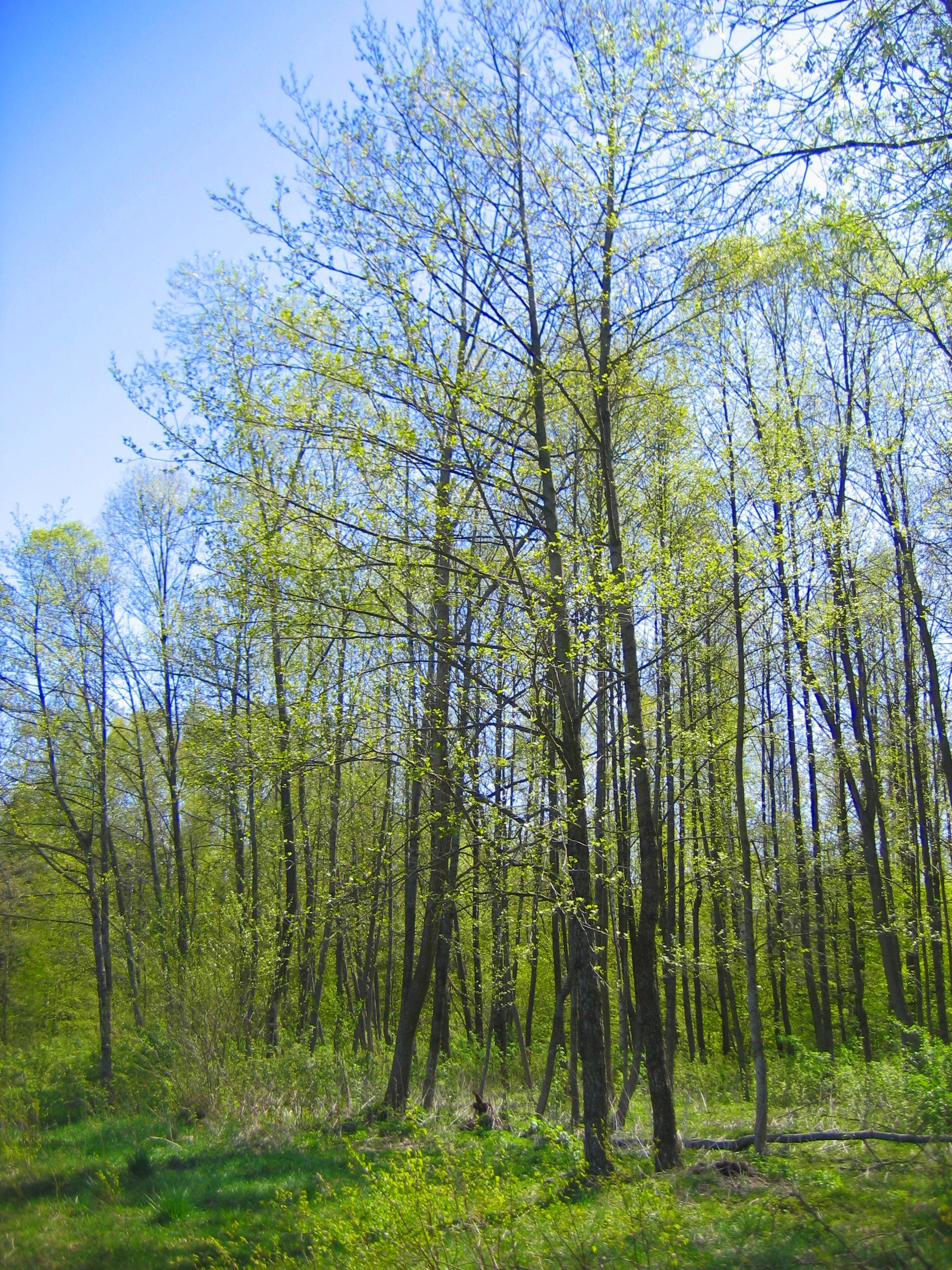
Common alder

The ash and common alder are widely distributed throughout the Białowieża Forest, though they are restricted to wet habitats. The ash primarily reproduces sexually, while the alder is associated with swampy habitats, where it often dominates through vegetative regeneration, particularly after the death of the parent tree. Multi-stemmed alders, a characteristic feature of alder carrs, are commonly sprouts that arise following the death of the parent tree.

The ash reaches 40 meters in height and up to 130 centimeters in diameter, while the alder can grow up to 40 meters in height and 1 meter in diameter. The maximum age of Białowieża's black alders is estimated to be between 150 and 200 years.

Ash wood is highly valued for its use in veneer production. In the 1970s, ash provided more than 1% of the total volume of wood harvested in the forest. The demand for ash wood led to its disappearance from many forests, while in others, it is being damaged by game species. In the 1970s, alder accounted for 7% of the total volume of wood harvested in the Białowieża Forest.

=== Aspen and birch ===
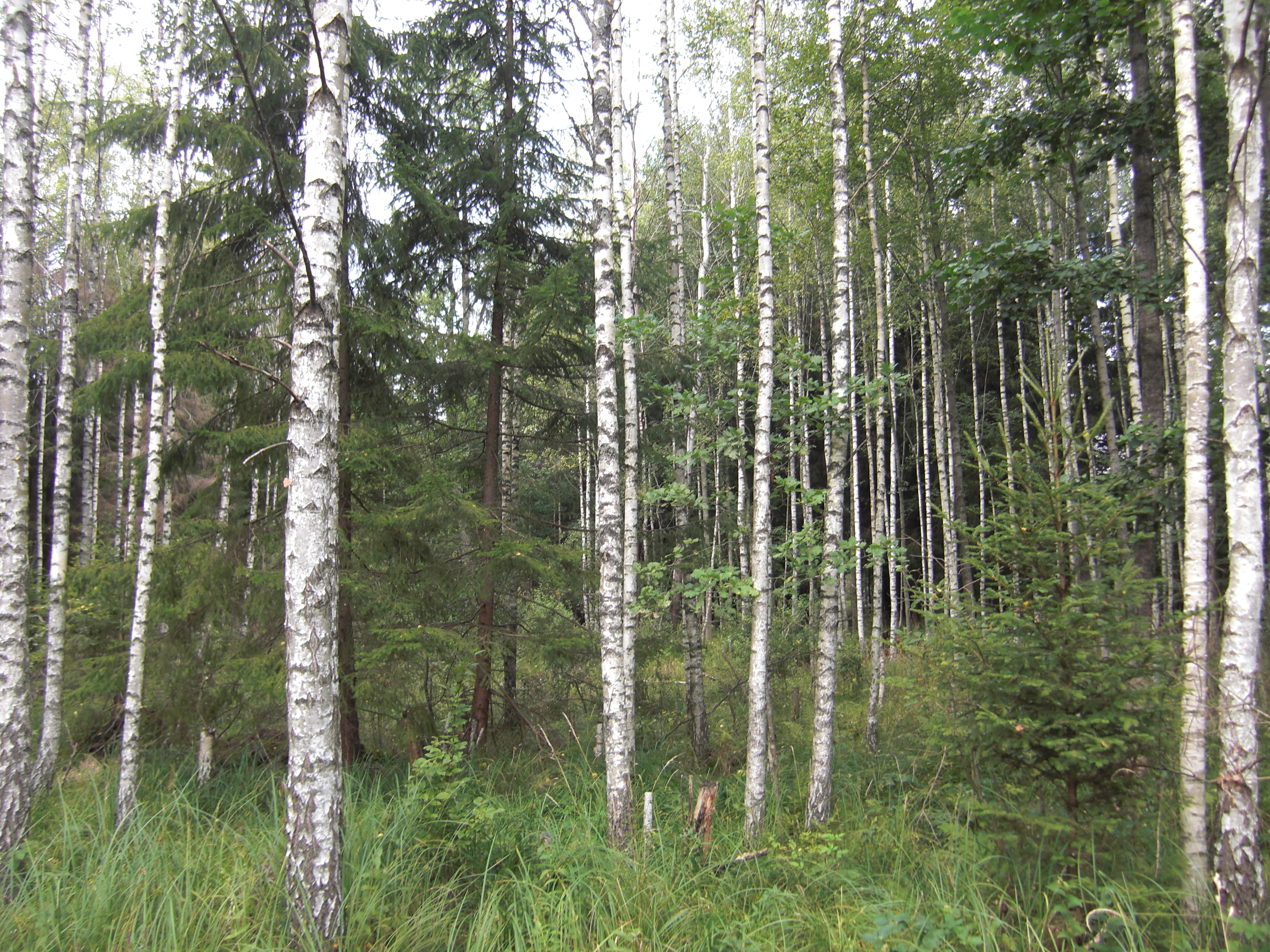
Betuletum pubescentis

Aspen and birches (silver birch and downy birch) typically occur as admixtures in the natural forests of various forest communities. They share a similar ecological history, as both are light-seeded species that quickly colonize areas where forest destruction has created gaps in the canopy. During World War I and the interwar period, large parts of the Białowieża Forest were clear-cut, providing favorable conditions for both species to establish.

In addition to their mass seed production, birches possess another survival trait: their seeds remain viable in the soil for a long time, forming "seed banks" in the ground. When conditions for germination become favorable, birch seeds are already present and ready to exploit the opportunity. Aspen, unlike birch, does not form seed banks but instead creates "root sprout banks" that are sustained by the root system of the parent tree. These sprouts can vegetate even under unfavorable light conditions and take advantage of gaps in the forest canopy.

Both species are now abundant in areas where clear-cuts occurred during the interwar period and no reforestation was carried out (referred to as "century-old stands"). Birch is the dominant species, constituting about 50% of these forests. Spruce and other species that composed the previous forest are also present as admixtures. Since the 1970s, the total area of these century-old stands has been gradually decreasing. In 1979, Mieczysław Kutrzeba estimated their area at around 8,000 hectares, while Borecki and Brzeziecki in 2001 estimated it to be less than 6,000 hectares. The wood of these species is not highly valued by foresters.

Aspen reaches 40 meters in height and 100 centimeters in diameter, with a maximum age of 180 years. The downy birch can grow up to 30 meters tall and 100 centimeters thick, while the silver birch reaches up to 30 meters in height and 70 centimeters in diameter. Accurately estimating the age of a birch is difficult due to the rotting of the wood from the inside, making it impossible to count the tree rings.

=== Willow ===
Fifteen species of willow are found in the Białowieża Forest. Willows predominantly occur in the valleys of the forest's rivers. Different species of willow vary in size and form, with some species occasionally growing as trees and others as shrubs. All willow species are dioecious, meaning each individual is either male or female, and different species can hybridize.

The willows are divided into two groups: narrow-leaved willows and broad-leaved willows. Narrow-leaved willows are represented by two tree species – eastern crack-willow and white willow – as well as shrubs like basket willow, purple willow, and almond willow. These species are associated with alder carrs and occur in the riverbank alluviums of the lower Narewka and Narew rivers. Broad-leaved willows include bitter willow, eared willow, and pale willow. An isolated species among the willows is the goat willow, which typically occurs as an admixture in the hornbeam forests. It spread due to clear-cutting activities in the 20th century. The goat willow can reach up to 30 meters in height.

Human activity has led to the spread of broad-leaved willows, which have occupied new sites, while narrow-leaved willows have significantly reduced their range.

=== Other tree species ===
In addition to the species already mentioned, the Białowieża Forest also contains wild fruit trees like the common pear and European crab apple. Bird cherry sporadically occurs in lowland hornbeam forests and near-stream alder-ash forests, such as along the Orłówka and Jabłonkówka rivers. It is rarely part of the main canopy, usually found in the undergrowth. Similarly, rowan is rarely part of the tree stand, mostly appearing in the undergrowth, and is found in all forest types except for swamp forests. Like spruce, rowan can grow on decaying trunks and uprooted trees. Black poplar appears as isolated trees along the Narew river valley on the northern outskirts of the forest. In the Narew valley, shrubby birch and twinflower also grow as relics from the ice age.

The common pear and European crab apple can occur in the undergrowth or the lower layer of tree stands in mixed forests and high hornbeam forests. The common pear can be found in places where, for example, a forester's lodge once stood. These trees usually grow to a small size.

According to research by Wojciech Adamowski in 2002, the forest is home to five non-native tree species that form spontaneous populations: sycamore, box elder, northern red oak, black locust, and domestic apple. Other non-native species with a wider spread include green ash and wild cherry. However, no tree stands in the forest contain more than 10% of these non-native species. These foreign trees are generally found individually or in small mixed groups, mainly in forest areas adjacent to non-forest lands or along communication routes.

== Impact of forest management ==
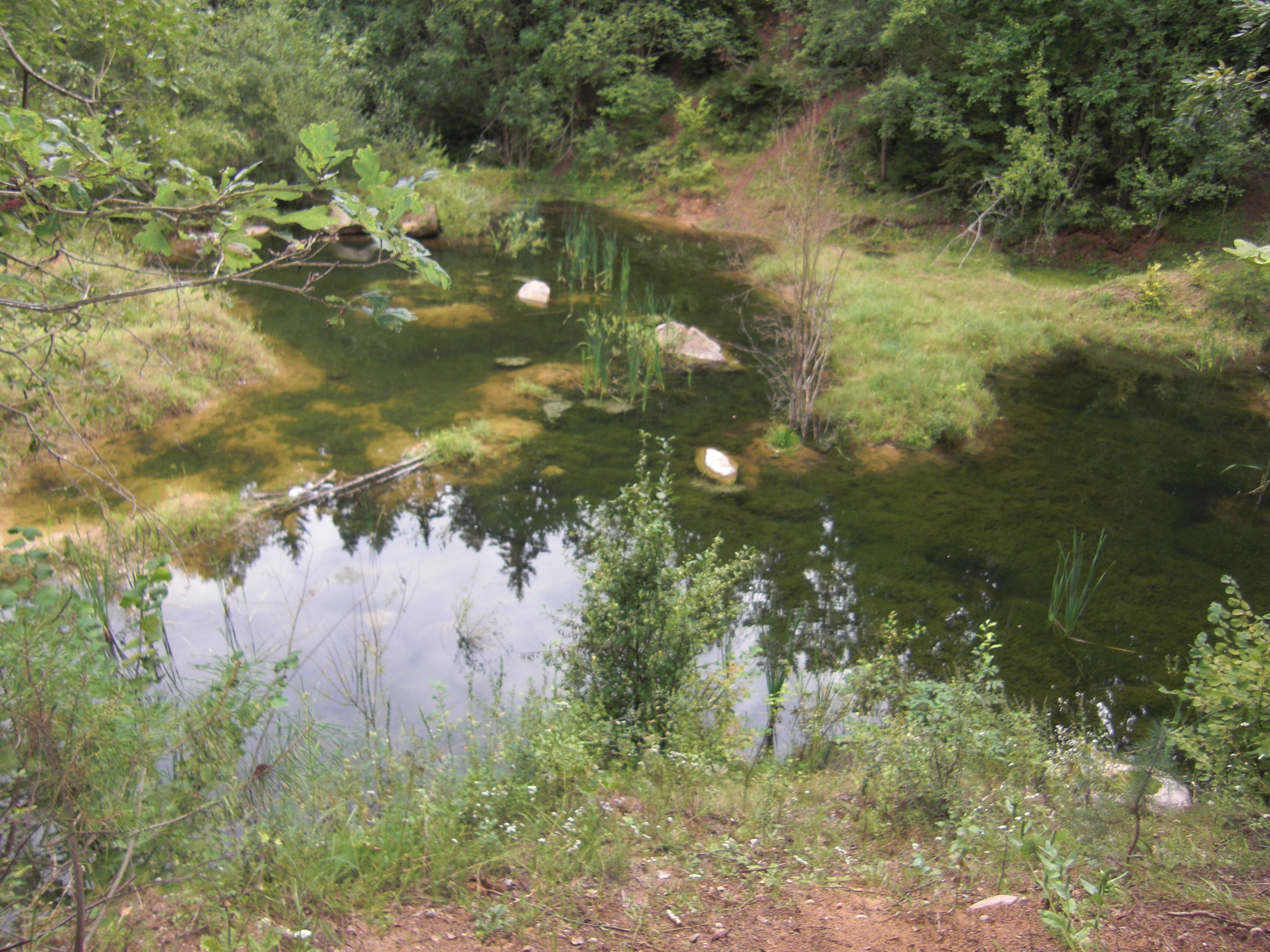
Former gravel pit in stand 242A

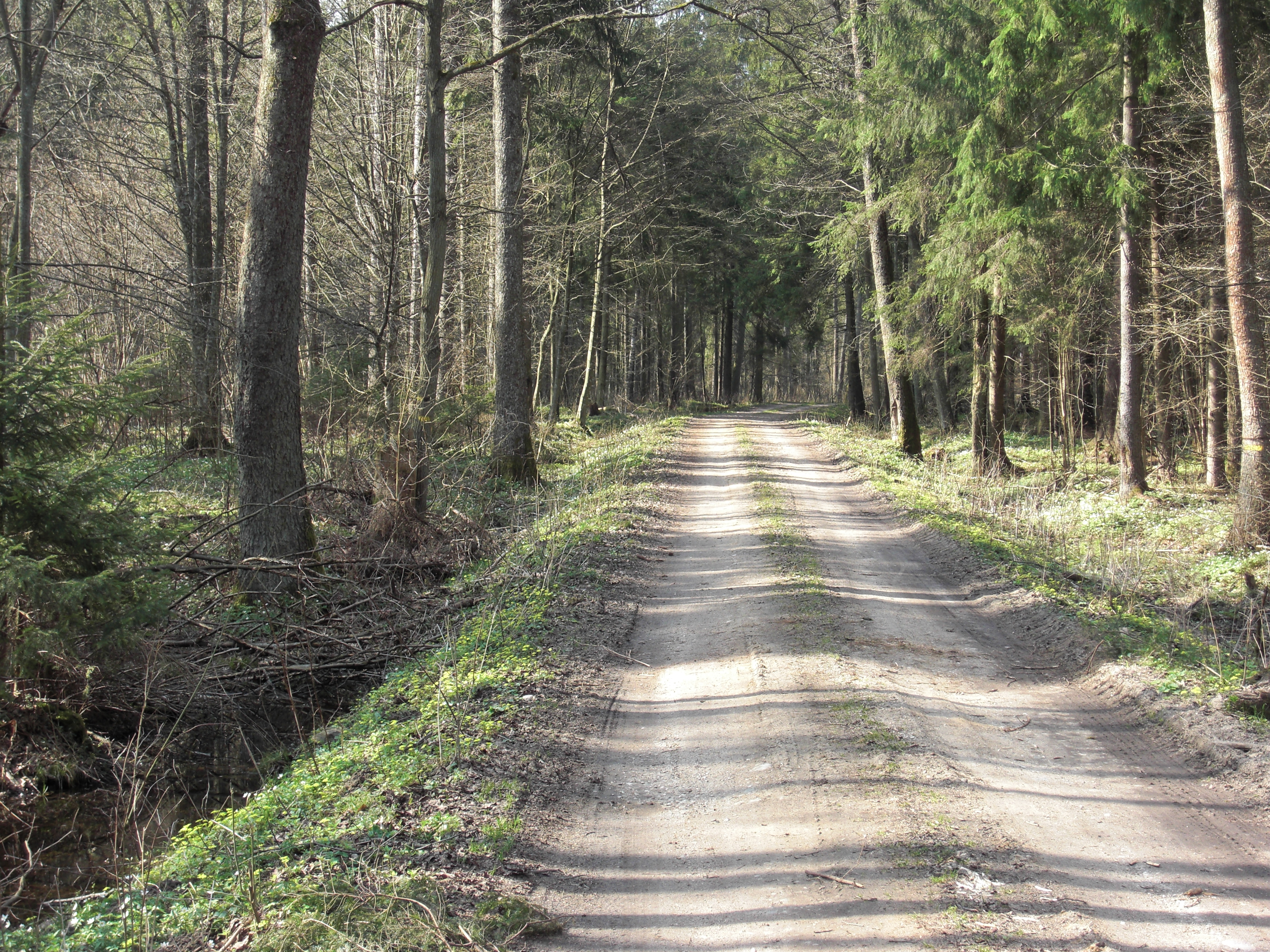
Gravel road on an embankment

The development of settlements was linked to the clearing of forests, leading to a reduction in the area of certain tree species. Since the first lands to be cleared were typically the fertile forests of hornbeam and oak, the cutting primarily targeted hardwoods such as oak, linden, maple, and hornbeam. The last large-scale deforestation occurred under Empress Catherine the Great, who, after the Kościuszko Uprising, distributed the forest to her favorites. In a short time, 40,000 hectares of forest – about a quarter of the forest at the time – were cut down.

The development of planned forest management led to a reduction in the number of tree species valued for construction materials, such as pedunculate oak, ash, and pine. The elimination of certain species altered the structure of forest stands, and the use of clear-cutting allowed some previously less common light-seed tree species, such as birch, aspen, and willow, to spread. In a slightly smaller degree, this also affected spruce, whose natural presence in the stands was always significant but increased further due to human activity.

During the Russian occupation, annual timber extraction never exceeded 10,000 m³. From 1916 to 1939, the Germans, Russians, and Poles cut down over 10 million m³, about a third of the forest's resources. This caused the most significant transformation of the forest stands in history. Between 1945 and 1946, forest usage was chaotic and plundering, with the primary concern being to protect the Białowieża Forest from bark beetle outbreaks. Between 1948 and 1958, an average of 189,000 m³ of timber was cut annually, reaching a record high of 212,000 m³ in 1975. In subsequent years, timber extraction decreased (168.1 m³ in 1980). In the 1990s, during the Third Polish Republic, logging continued at the same level as in the 1980s. In the early 21st century, planned annual logging was around 150,000 m³.

Another form of human intervention involved the cultivation of certain species, particularly pine, which led to its presence in areas where it had previously been absent.

Other forms of forest exploitation also impacted the structure of forest stands, such as the excessive hunting of game in the late 19th and early 20th centuries. This led to the reduction or disappearance of young trees of hardwood species such as oak, ash, and linden. Linden, in particular, was affected, with no trees sprouting from the late 19th and early 20th century. Similar effects occurred from cattle grazing in the forest, which continued until the 1970s. The production of charcoal, tar, and potash led to local depletion of certain species.

During the Polish People's Republic era, in the Hajnówka Forest District, in stands 437, 438, 461, 462, and 485, the gradual dying of forest stands occurred on about 125 ha due to the pollution of the Leśna Prawa river. The pollution came from industrial and municipal sewage from the town of Hajnówka. In 1977, the phenol compound content where the river entered the forest was 37.8 mg per liter, while the permissible norm at the time was 0.02 mg per liter. The sewage was not treated, and the river was completely lifeless.

The course of the Narewka river was regulated several times, the first in the 18th century. In the 20th century, municipal sewage from Białowieża, artificial fertilizers, and pesticides from fields began flowing into the river.

Human intervention in the water relations of the forest dates back a long time, with rivers being regulated for timber rafting as early as the 17th century, and drainage ditches being dug, especially between the 1950s and 1970s in the Belarusian part. This caused the adjacent areas to be drained. The construction of forest railways and gravel roads, also built after World War II, often created embankments that hindered natural drainage. The greatest changes in water relations occurred in the right-bank catchment of the Leśna river. These changes impacted the structure and condition of the tree stands in floodplains, alder carrs, bog pine forests, and swamp spruce forests, indirectly affecting the stands within the Białowieża National Park.

Despite these human influences, the forest has remained in an exceptional condition, preserving fragments of its woods in a state nearly untouched by human activity.

== Protection of the Białowieża Forest ==
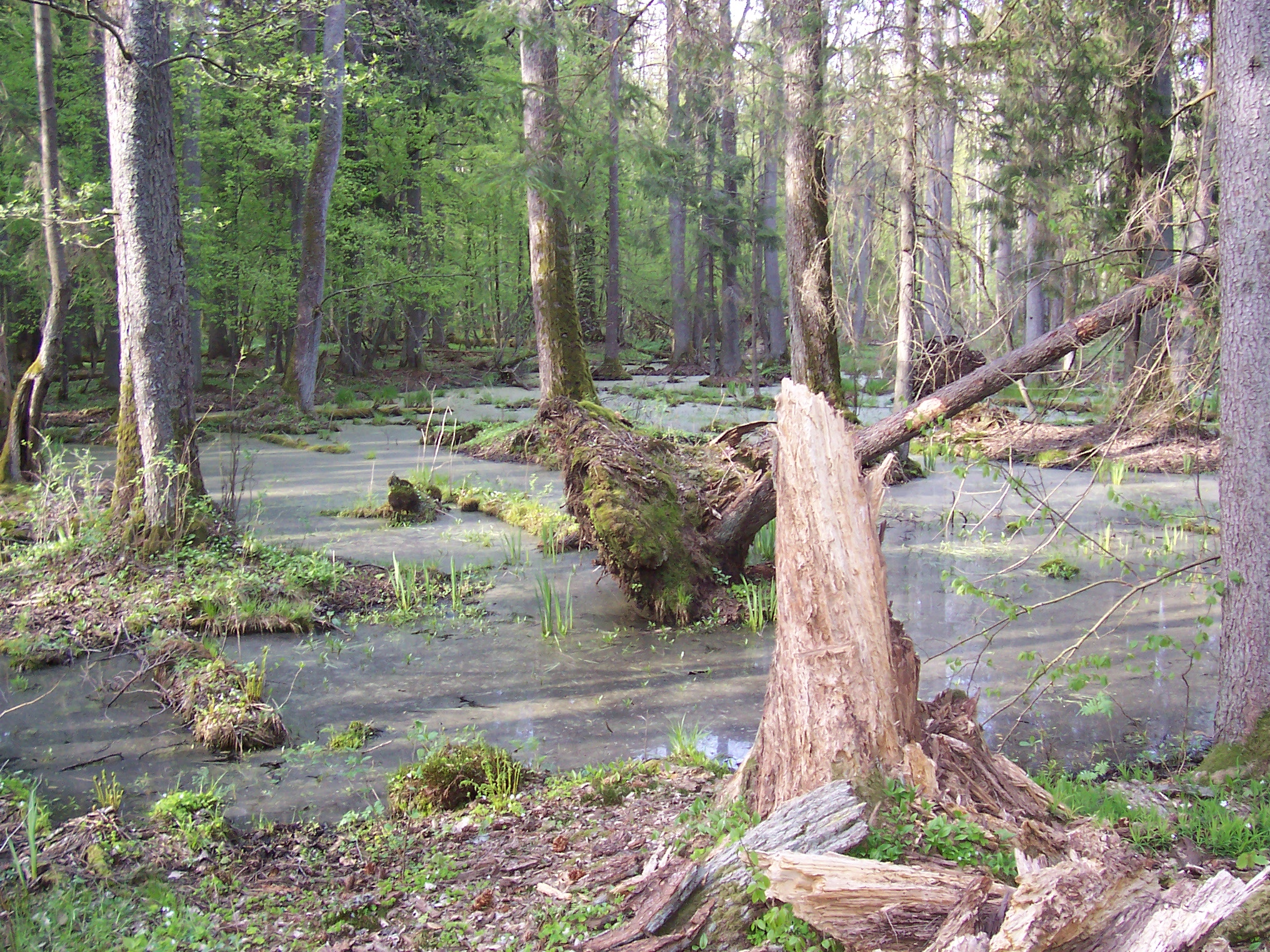
Nature reserve of the Białowieża National Park

Almost simultaneously with the start of industrial exploitation of the Białowieża Forest, voices began to rise from German scientists advocating for the protection of parts of its forests. One of its proponents was Hugo Conwentz in 1916. After the war, thanks to the efforts of Władysław Szafer, supported by other Polish scientists, the Ministry of Agriculture and State Property, by a decision on 29 December 1921, designated the forest as a reserve, and later, in 1932, the Rezerwat Forestry District was transformed into a national park, covering 4,693.24 ha. This was reactivated after World War II by the decree of the Council of Ministers of the Polish People's Republic on 21 October 1947, and from then on, it became known as the Białowieża National Park. The park's western boundary was the Narewka river, the northern boundary was the Hwoźna river, and the eastern boundary was the state border with the Soviet Union. The dominant trees are spruce and hornbeam, with smaller areas occupied by alder, pine, birch, oak, and ash. No economic activities are carried out in the park, which serves scientific, educational, and partially tourist purposes. In 1979, UNESCO included the Białowieża National Park on the World Heritage List. On 26 October 1996, the park's area was expanded to 10,502 ha, but the newly added area is not part of the strict reserve.

In the strict reserve, there have never been planned logging activities, and the forest has never undergone industrial exploitation. Human intervention has always been minimal, never interrupting natural processes.

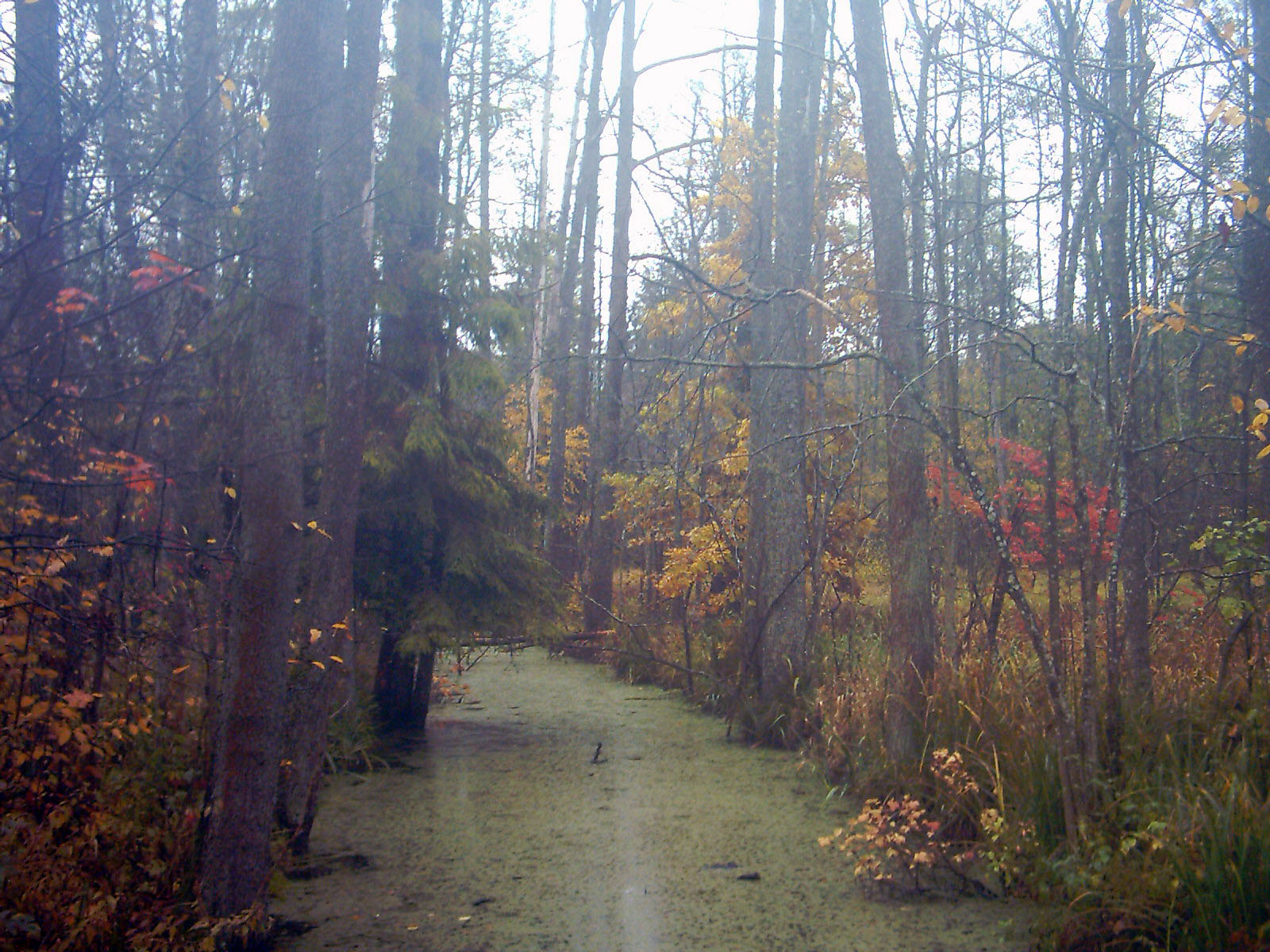
Rezerwat Głęboki Kąt, jesień 2009

Parallel to the establishment of the national park, various other reserves were created to protect specific forest stands within the Białowieża Forest. In stands 814 and 815, a 838-ha pine reserve was established. The Nikor Forestry District saw the creation of a 12.2-ha fir reserve and a 95.25-ha wetland reserve, home to around 80 firs located far to the east of their natural range.

In 1921, a protective reserve was established along both sides of the road between Hajnówka and Białowieża, with a width of 500 meters. Another such reserve was created in 1931 along the road to Pruzhany, with a width of 100 meters on each side. These reserves had partial protection, with dead wood and wind-felled trees removed.

In 1936, a small reserve was created in stand 804 to protect regenerative spruce (1.8 ha) and a 0.23-ha ivy reserve in stands 646 and 647, as the northernmost natural boundary of ivy in Europe runs through the forest.

In 1961, a 24.51-ha reserve of sessile oak was established at Lipiny, within stand 272D. At the same time, the Nieznanowo and Pogorzelce reserves were created. In 1969, a 1,356.91-ha landscape reserve was recognized along the road between Hajnówka and Białowieża. During the Polish People's Republic era, additional reserves were established, including Wysokie Bagno, Wilczy Szlak, Głuszec, Szczekotowo, Starzyna, Michnówka, Sitki, and Głęboki Kąt. Additionally, trees with monumental status were protected outside the park.

In 1986, the Białowieża Forest was recognized as a Protected Landscape Area, covering 860 km². More than 50% of its area was protected by various conservation measures. By 2001, the nature reserves in the Polish part of the forest amounted to 3,459.75 ha. Additionally, 401 trees were registered in the national gene pool protection program, and over 1,100 trees were recognized as natural monuments.

In the Soviet era, strict reserves in the Belarusian part of the forest covered 18% of its area. In 1991, independent Belarus protected its entire part of the forest, turning it into a national park covering 1,100 km², with 65% of the area designated for scientific research. In 1992, UNESCO listed the Belarusian part of the forest as a World Heritage Site.

In 1994, the "Project for the Creation of the Białowieża Forest National Park" was published, proposing that the entire Polish part of the Białowieża Forest be designated a national park. This project analyzed the damage caused to the forest in the 20th century due to forest management. At the same time, the "Forest Promotion Complex" (526 km²) was established to protect the forest's substance and values, located partly outside the boundaries of the Białowieża National Park.

In 2003, the Ministry of the Environment created the Lasy Naturalne Puszczy Białowieskiej Reserve, covering 85.8 km² in the Białowieża, Hajnówka, and Browsk forest districts. The reserve is divided into 19 fragments and aims to preserve natural forests (about 30 km²) and near-natural habitats typical for the Białowieża Forest, including floodplain forests, alder carrs, and woodlands dominated by old tree stands, with significant participation of alder, oak, and ash.

== Bibliography ==
- Adamowski, Wojciech (2008). "Ale lipy!" [What Lime Trees!] (PDF). Matecznik Białowieski (in Polish). 4.
- Adamowski, Wojciech (2008). "Sosny niebotyczne" [Towering Pines] (PDF). Matecznik Białowieski (in Polish). 3.
- Faliński, Janusz Bogdan; Hereźniak, J. M. (1977). Zielone grądy i czarne bory Białowieży [Green Uplands and Black Forests of Białowieża] (in Polish). Warsaw: Nasza Księgarnia.
- Karpiński, Jan Jerzy (1977). Puszcza Białowieska [Białowieża Forest] (in Polish) (3rd ed.). Warsaw: Wiedza Powszechna.
- Karpiński, Jan Jerzy (1961). Białowieski Park Narodowy [Białowieża National Park] (in Polish). Warsaw: Sport Turystyka.
- Pawlaczyk, Paweł (2010). "Zbiorowiska leśne" [Forest Communities]. Białowieski Park Narodowy. Poznać-Zrozumieć-Zachować III [Białowieża National Park. Know-Understand-Conserve III] (PDF) (in Polish). Białowieża: Białowieski Park Narodowy.
- Więcko, Edward (1984). Puszcza Białowieska [Białowieża Forest] (in Polish). Warsaw: Państwowe Wydawnictwo Naukowe. ISBN 83-01-04597-3.
