= Stigmella tormentillella =

Scientific classification
- Kingdom: Animalia
- Phylum: Arthropoda
- Class: Insecta
- Order: Lepidoptera
- Family: Nepticulidae
- Genus: Stigmella
- Species: S. tormentillella

Binomial name
- Stigmella tormentillella (Herrich-Schaffer, 1860)

Synonyms
- Nepticula tormentillella Herrich-Schaffer, 1860

Species of moth

Stigmella tormentillella is a moth of the family Nepticulidae. It is found from Germany to the Pyrenees and Italy, and from France to Romania.

The larvae feed on Potentilla alba, Potentilla aurea, Potentilla crantzii, Potentilla erecta, Potentilla reptans and Potentilla tabernaemontani. They mine the leaves of their host plant.
