= Stanisław Karpiński =

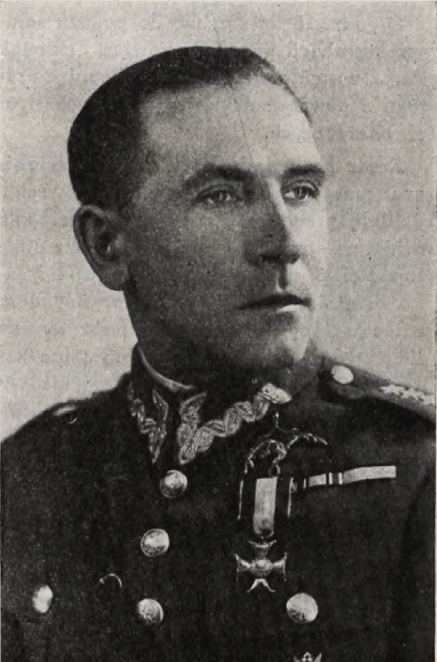

Stanisław Karpiński (17 December 1891 - 30 January 1982) was a pilot in the Polish Army, Polish Air Force and Royal Air Force, reaching the rank of brigadier general.

== Life ==
=== 1891-1924 ===
He was born in Piotrków, in what was then the Piotrków Governorate in Congress Poland to civil servant Józef and Julia née Żebek-Wiśniewski.. His five brothers included the naturalist Jan Jerzy Karpiński. In the 1904–1905 school year he attended the Municipal Gymnasium in his home town of Piotrków. In 1905 he was arrested for taking part in a school strike.

On 1 December 1913 he was conscripted into the Imperial Russian Army and posted to its 15th Artillery Brigade at Odesa, which was then part of 15th Infantry Division. From 1 August 1914 he fought at the front as part of that Brigade. For his efforts he was sent back to Odesa, this time to attend the pilot training school there, graduating from it in 1915.

In 1917 he volunteered for the Polish Aviation Unit being organised in Odesa and when it was disbanded the following year moved to Warsaw to become a Second Lieutenant in the newly-established Polish Air Force. He took part in the disarming of German soldiers, the capture of Mokotów Field airfield and the further early organisation of the Polish Air Force, rising to captain. He established the Aero-Film company in 1923, whose goal was to produce "film propaganda for Polish aviation," and wrote the script for that company's first Polish aviation film, "Winged Victor", in 1924.

=== 1930s ===
From 1933 to 1936, he was the commander of a line squadron in the 3rd Air Regiment in Poznań. From 1936 to 1937, he attended the first course at the Higher Air School, part of the Higher Military School in Warsaw - graduates of that School were not entitled to the title of certified officer. After completing the course he was appointed head of the General Department of the Air Staff within the Polish General Staff. He was the closest collaborator of the Chief of the Air Staff, Brig. Gen. Obs. Stanisław Ujejski.

During the 1930s he also indulged his passion for air rallies. On 2 July 1931 flew a non-stop flight around Poland in a rally version of the Lublin R.Xa liaison aircraft, carrying a passenger, on a 1,650 km route from Warsaw to Poznań, in 12 hours and 15 minutes.. From 23 September to 7 October 1931, he flew an R.Xa aircraft on a 6,450 km route around Europe in 49 hours and 5 minutes. From 2 to 24 October 1932 he flew a modified rally version of the R.Xa bis "Silver Bird" on a route including Warsaw–Istanbul–Baghdad–Tehran–Kabul–Baghdad–Cairo–Jerusalem–Istanbul–Warsaw, covering a distance of 14,930 km (flight time 108 hours 50 minutes), with mechanic Wiktor Rogalski.

On 21 October 1935 he began an attempt to fly to Australia with Wiktor Rogalski, flying a rally version of the Lublin R.XIII Dr "Blue Bird." He flew from Warsaw via Istanbul, Baghdad, Karachi, Calcutta, Rangoon, and Bangkok, among other places. However, on 10 November the aircraft was damaged on takeoff from the muddy Kohlak airfield in Siam, after covering 11,153 km, forcing him to abandon the rally. In 1939, Karpiński planned another rally to Australia, Tasmania and New Zealand in an RWD-15 bis aircraft, with a planned start date of 15 March 1939, but this was postponed due to the German occupation of Czechoslovakia.

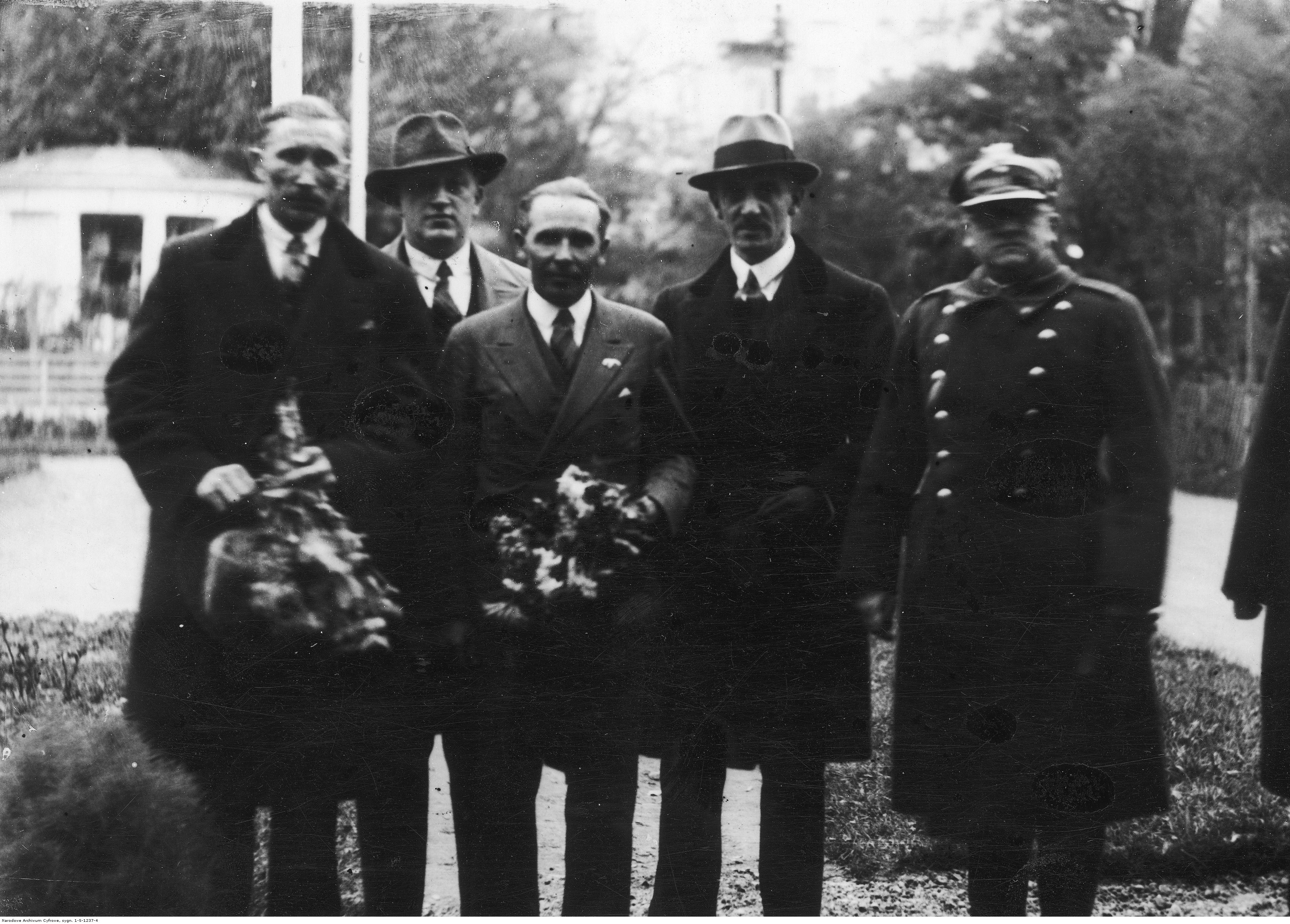
Stanisław Karpiński (second from left) and Wiktor Rogalski after the rally over Asia Minor

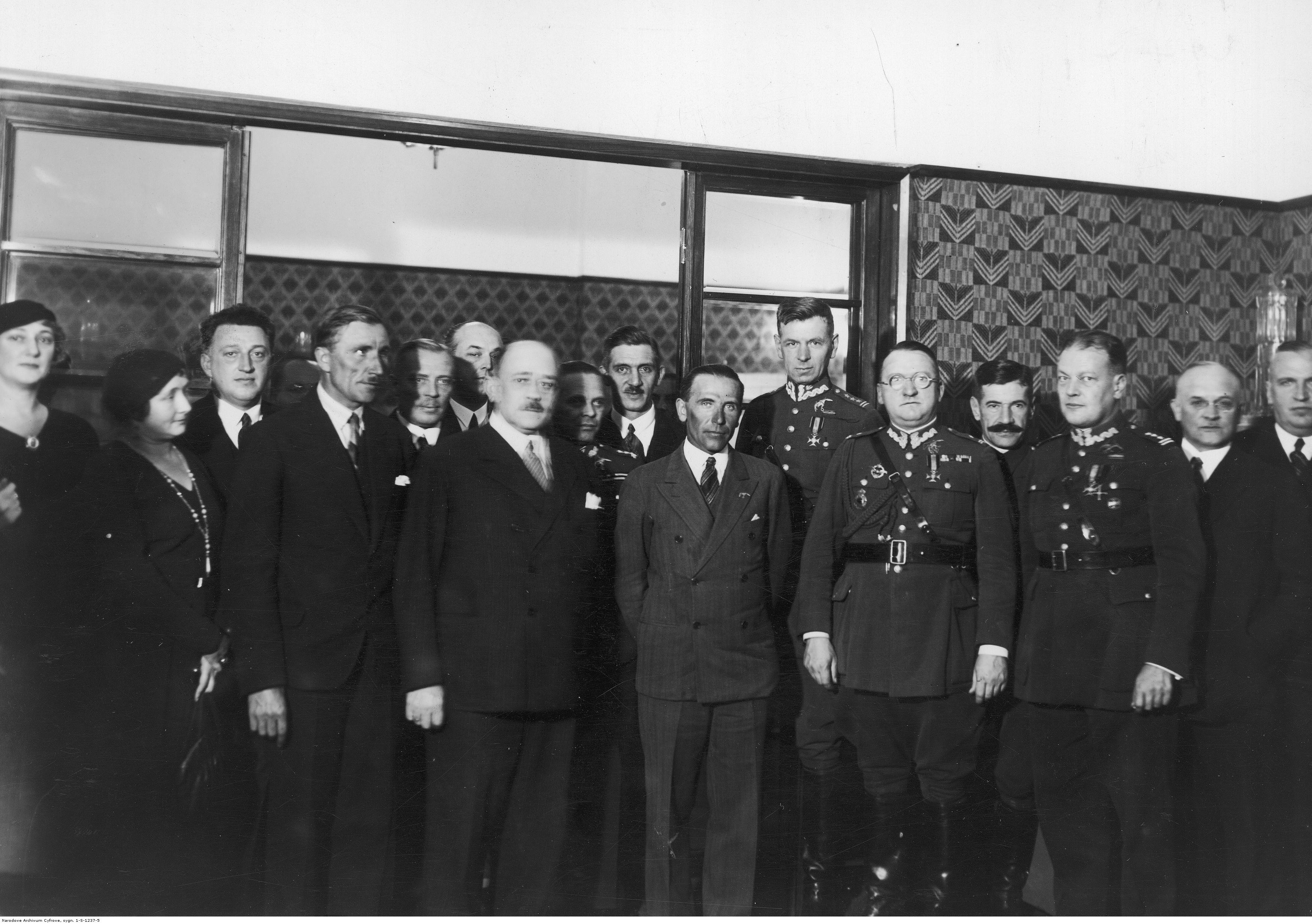
St. Karpiński and W. Rogalski air rally over Asia Minor – ceremony at the Warsaw Aeroclub

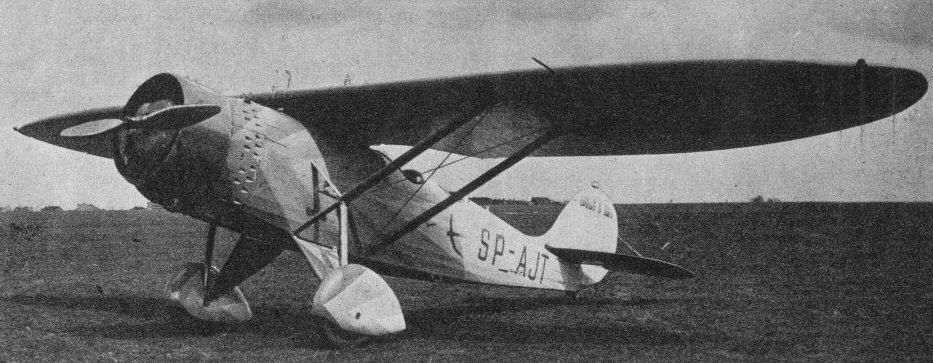
Lublin R.XIII Dr "Błękitny Ptak" ("Blue Bird")

=== World War II ===
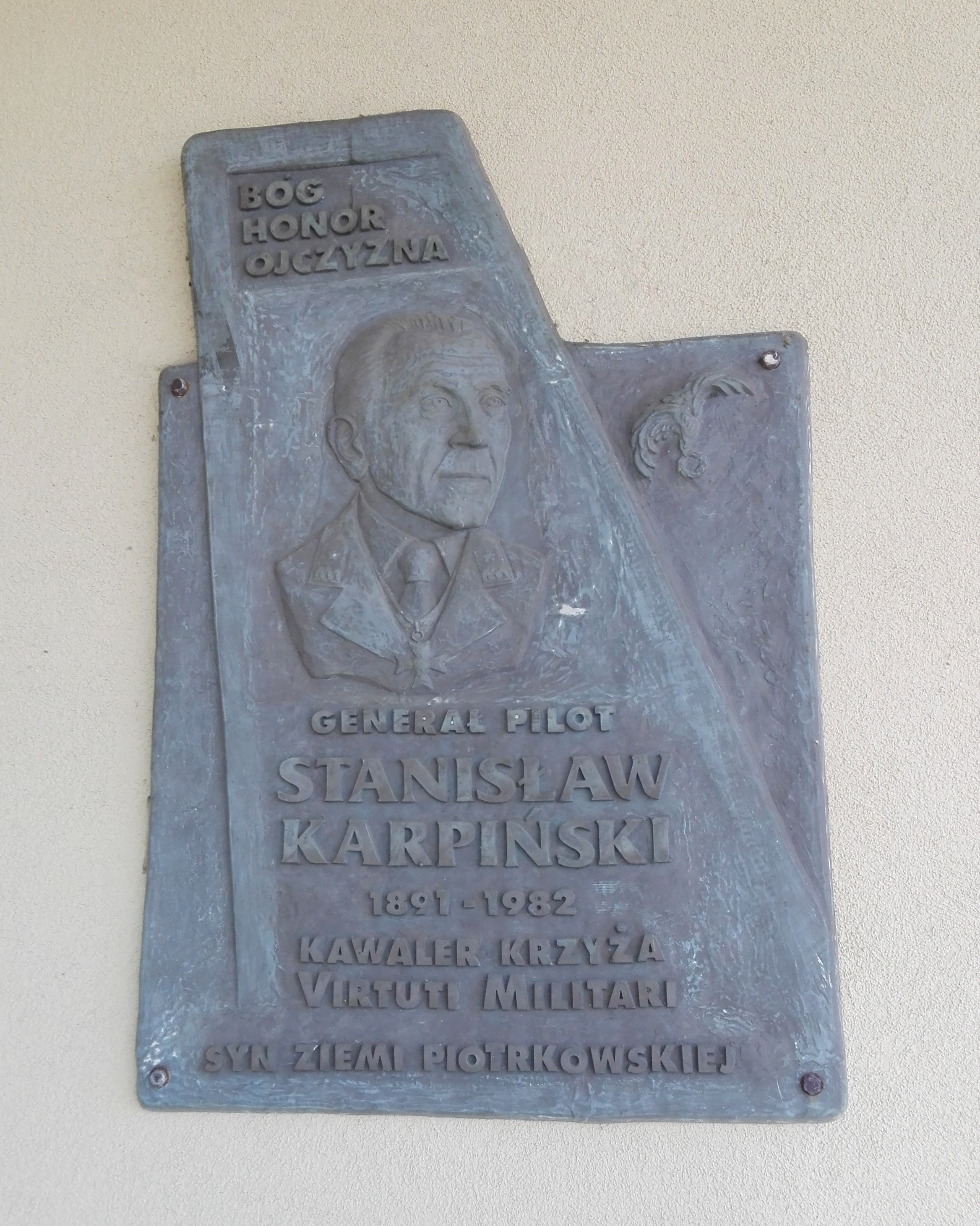
Plaque in his honour at Piotrków Trybunalski Airfield.

At the time of Germany's invasion of Poland in 1939 he was deputy chief of the Air Staff within the General Staff, with the rank of lieutenant colonel. During the September Campaign, he served on the staff of the Supreme Air Commander, General Józef Zając. He and his staff evacuated to Romania, then in October 1939 to France. There he was appointed chief of staff of the Polish Air Force Command by the Commander-in-Chief and began organizing the Polish Air Force in France. Promoted to the rank of colonel in May 1940, after the fall of France he moved to the United Kingdom, where he continued to organise the Polish Air Force, helping to draft the Polish-British Air Agreement. He received the Royal Air Force service number P-1378. From 21 January 1941 (Note: 29 January according to (in Polish) Wacław Król, Polskie dywizjony lotnicze w Wielkiej Brytanii 1940-1945, Warszawa 1982, ISBN 83-11-06745-7, p. 73) to 1 May 1942 he was the first liaison officer to RAF Bomber Command, under which the Polish bomber force then fell. In May 1942 he was appointed Deputy Inspector of the Polish Air Force, with the British rank of Air Commodore, equivalent to brigadier general. After organizational changes in April 1944 he became deputy commander of the Polish Air Force.

=== Post-war ===
On 1 January 1946, he was promoted to brigadier general in the general corps. In April 1947 he was put in command of the remaining elements of the Polish Air Force in the UK. Due to the gradual dismantling of the Polish Air Force within the UK he also held the position of Inspector General of the Polish Air Force Training and Deployment Corps at the RAF. He held these positions until the disbandment of the Polish Air Force in the UK in autumn 1949. He then remained in exile in London. From 1950 to 1954 he was president of the Polish Airmen's Association in Great Britain and from 1951 onwards served three terms as a member of the émigré National Council of the Republic of Poland (renamed the Council of the Republic of Poland in 1954). Due to health issues, in 1958 he settled in Los Angeles in California in the USA with his wife, aviator Stefania Wojtulanis, where he died in 1982.

== Works ==
He was the author of the non-fiction works "Polish Wings in My Long-Distance Flights" (1935) and "Flight Interrupted in Siam" (1939), both about his life experiences, along with the novel "On the Wings of a Hurricane" (1976, published in London and Los Angeles) as well as articles, poems and other publications on aviation topics.

== Promotions ==
- Captain – 1 June 1919
- Major – 1 January 1933
- Lieutenant Colonel – 19 March 1937 and 5th place in the Air Force Officer Corps, Line Group
- Colonel – 3 May 1940
- Brigadier General – 1 January 1946

== Honours and decorations ==
- Silver Cross of the Virtuti Militari nr 6396
- Commander's Cross of the Order of Polonia Restituta
- Cross of Valour
- Independence Medal
- Gold Cross of Merit, four times
- Order of the British Empire

== Bibliography (in Polish) ==
- Czmur, Stefan; Wójcik, Waldemar (2003). Generałowie w stalowych mundurach. Warszawa-Poznań: Dom Wydawniczy „Bellona” i Redakcja Czasopism Wojsk Lotniczych i Obrony Powietrznej. ISBN 8311095876.
- Jerzy R. Konieczny, Tadeusz Malinowski: "Mała encyklopedia lotników polskich – Tomik II", Warszawa 1988, ISBN 83-206-0734-5,
- Tadeusz Jerzy Krzystek, [Anna Krzystek] (2012). Polskie Siły Powietrzne w Wielkiej Brytanii w latach 1940-1947 łącznie z Pomocniczą Lotniczą Służbą Kobiet (PLSK-WAAF). Sandomierz: Stratus. ISBN 9788361421597. OCLC 276981965.
- Kryska-Karski, Tadeusz; Żurakowski, Stanisław (1991). Generałowie Polski niepodległej. Warszawa: Editions Spotkania.
- Władysław Bartosz: Gen. bryg. pil. Stanisław Karpiński (1891-1982) (w 10 rocznicę śmierci), Polska Zbrojna 1992,
- (jrk) Stanisław Karpiński (1891-1982), Skrzydlata Polska,
- Ryszard Bartel, Jan Chojnacki, Tadeusz Królikiewicz, Adam Kurowski: Z historii polskiego lotnictwa wojskowego 1918-1939, Wydawnictwo MON, Warszawa 1978, wyd. I,
- Rybka, Ryszard; Stepan, Kamil (2006). Rocznik oficerski 1939. Stan na dzień 23 marca 1939. Kraków: Fundacja CDCN. ISBN 9788371888991.
- "Kronika Polska". Skrzydlata Polska. Warszawa: Liga Obrony Powietrznej i Przeciwgazowej. July–August 1931. ISSN 0137-866X. OCLC 839207783.
- "Kronika Polska". Skrzydlata Polska. Warszawa: Liga Obrony Powietrznej i Przeciwgazowej. October 1931. ISSN 0137-866X. OCLC 839207783.
- "Polski lot do Azji i Afryki". Skrzydlata Polska. Warszawa: Liga Obrony Powietrznej i Przeciwgazowej. October–November 1932. ISSN 0137-866X. OCLC 839207783.
