= Jan Jerzy Karpinski =

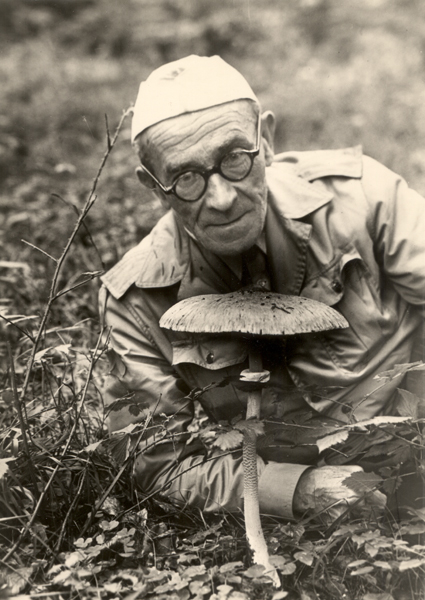

Jan Jerzy Karpiński (12 April 1896 – 17 November 1965) was a Polish forester, entomologist, and ecologist who served as a director of the Białowieża National Park from 1932 to 1952. He was a writer of popular books on conservation, wildlife, and ecology.

== Biography ==
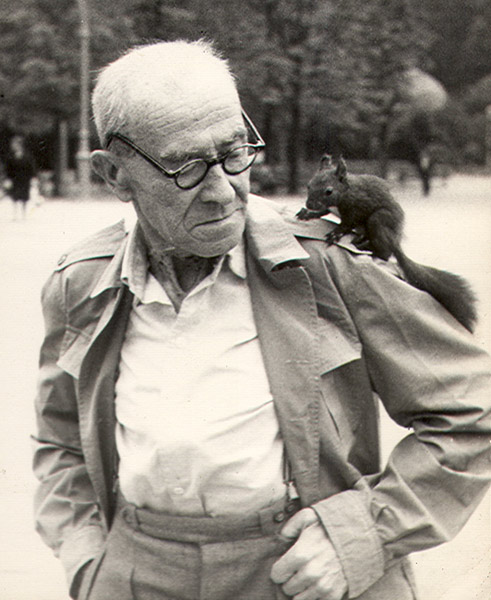

Karpiński was born in Piotrków to Józef and Juljanna née Łebek. One of his brothers was the aviator Stanisław Karpiński. Karpiński went to high school in Piotrków before going to the Gymnasium in Kaluga. In 1915 he went to St. Petersburg University and graduated from the forestry institute in 1919. He studied entomology under Nikolai Cholodkovsky. He also met Anna Domaszewicz who would later be his wife. He then joined the forest administration and began to teach at the forestry school in Zagórze. In 1928 he became a reserve forest inspector at the Białowieża National Park. He helped establish a library, a museum, and a laboratory at the national park. He also established permanent research plots. In 1933 he received a doctorate with a thesis on the bark beetles of Białowieża. During World War II he was in Lithuania in the village of Rezgi with relatives of his wife. He worked on private farms and taught people. He returned to Poland in 1944 as director of the Białowieża National Park. He was made a full professor in 1959.

Karpiński wrote numerous popular books, most illustrated with his photographs and drawings.

Karpiński died in Warsaw and is buried in the Powązki Cemetery.
