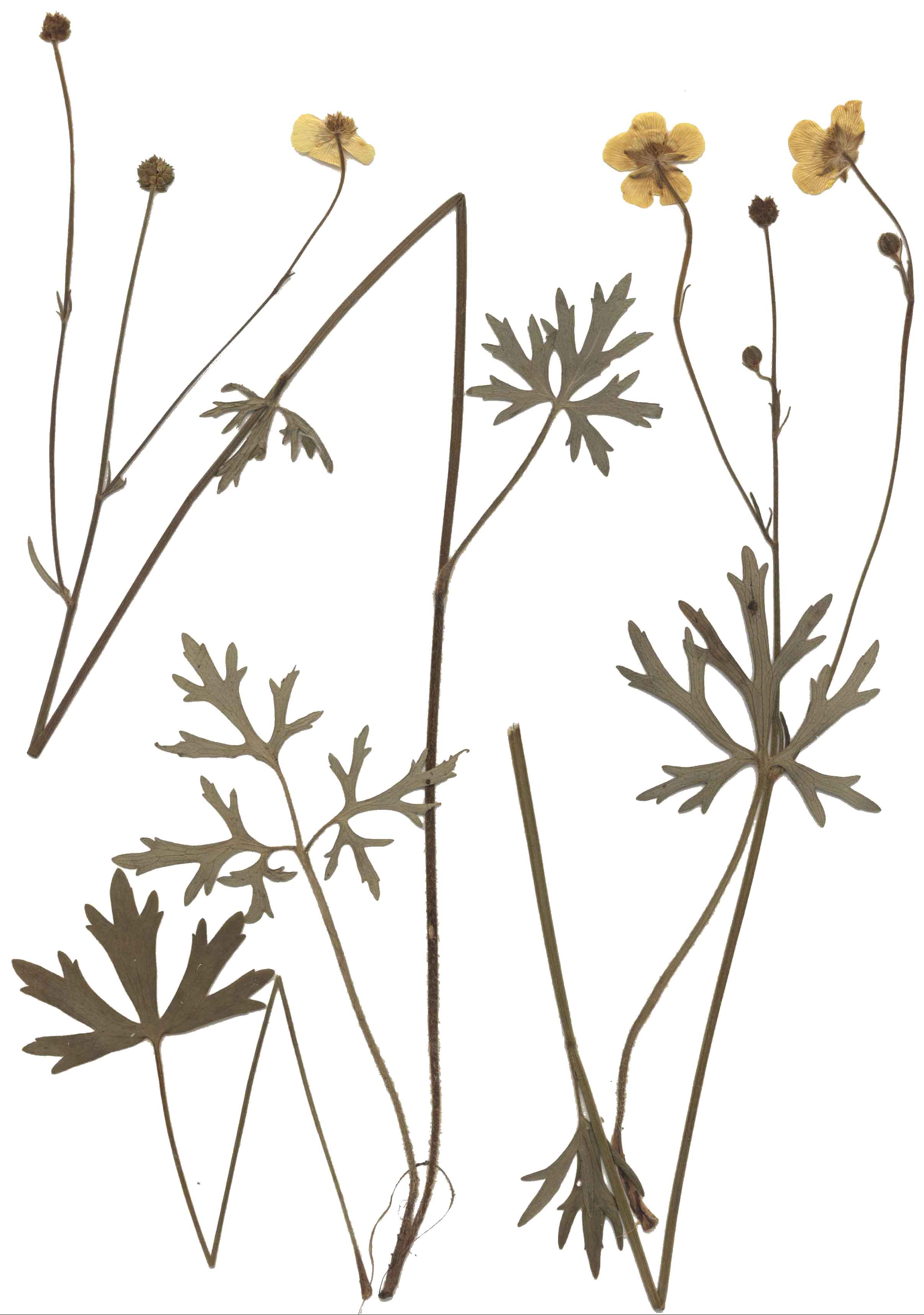
- Ranunculus polyanthemos subsp. polyanthemoides

Scientific classification
- Kingdom: Plantae
- Clade: Tracheophytes
- Clade: Angiosperms
- Clade: Eudicots
- Order: Ranunculales
- Family: Ranunculaceae
- Genus: Ranunculus
- Species: R. polyanthemos

Binomial name
- Ranunculus polyanthemos L.

= Ranunculus polyanthemos =

Species of flowering plant

Ranunculus polyanthemos is a species of flowering plant belonging to the family Ranunculaceae.

Its native range is Europe to Russian Far East and Iran.
