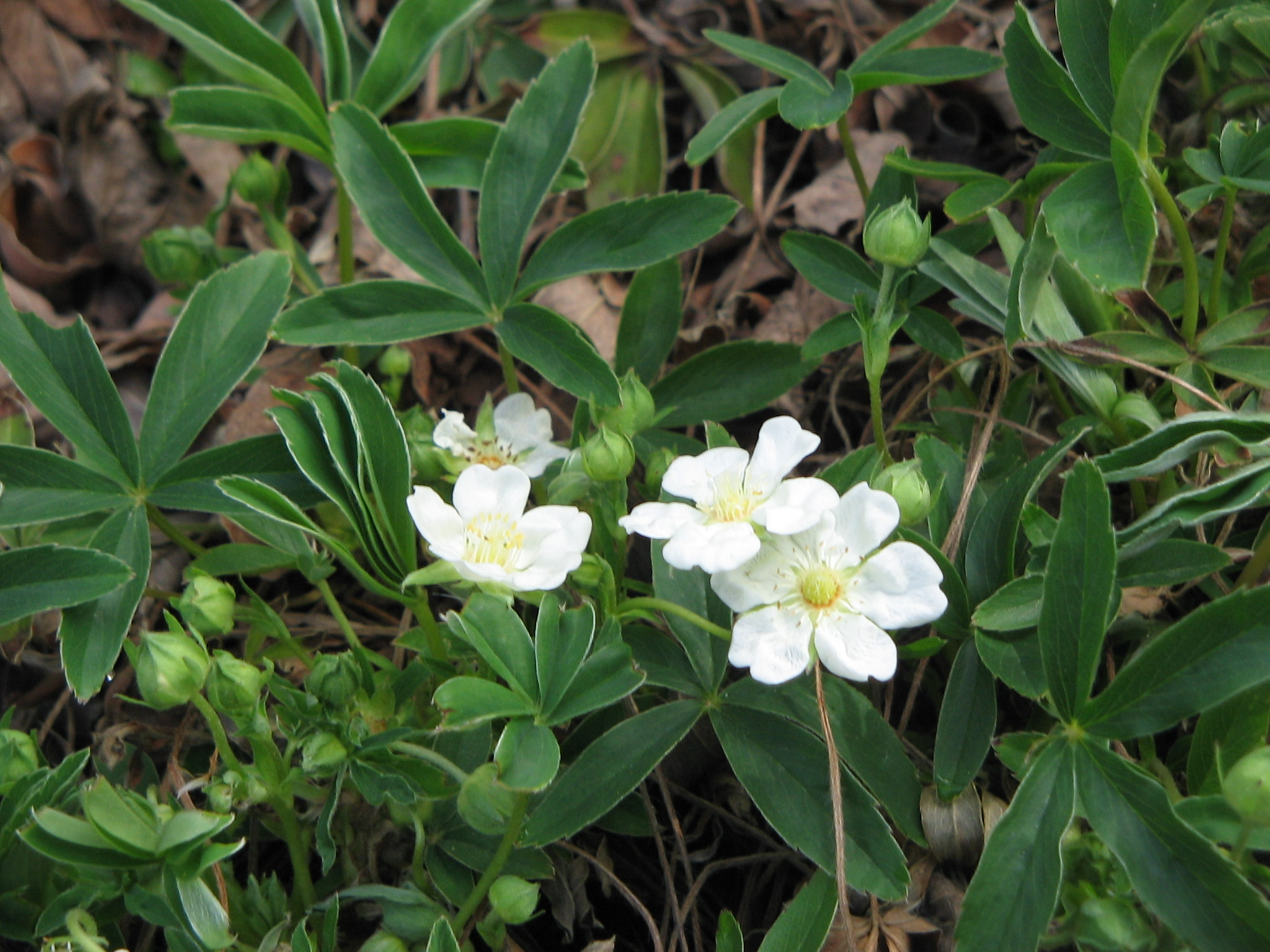

Scientific classification
- Kingdom: Plantae
- Clade: Tracheophytes
- Clade: Angiosperms
- Clade: Eudicots
- Clade: Rosids
- Order: Rosales
- Family: Rosaceae
- Genus: Potentilla
- Species: P. alba

Binomial name
- Potentilla alba L.

= Potentilla alba =

Species of flowering plant

Potentilla alba is a species of cinquefoil found in France
