= Euura herbaceae =

Scientific classification
- Domain: Eukaryota
- Kingdom: Animalia
- Phylum: Arthropoda
- Class: Insecta
- Order: Hymenoptera
- Suborder: Symphyta
- Family: Tenthredinidae
- Genus: Euura
- Species: E. herbaceae

Binomial name
- Euura herbaceae (Cameron, 1876)

Synonyms
- Nematus herbaceae Cameron, 1876; Pontania herbaceae Konow (1890); Pontania (Eupontania) herbacea [sic] Zinovjev (1985); Nematus (Pontania) herbaceae Zholochovtsev (1988); Eupontania herbaceae Vikberg (2003); Pontania polaris Malaise, 1921

Species of sawfly forming galls

Euura herbaceae is a species of sawfly belonging to the family Tenthredinidae (common sawflies). The larvae feed internally in a gall formed on the leaves of dwarf willow (Salix herbacea) and polar willow (Salix polaris). Galls of E. aquilonis are similar and the larvae need to be examined to tell them apart.

== Description of the gall ==
Descriptions of the gall differs depending on the source. According to Redfern et al (2011) the thin-walled gall is globular, 4–10 mm diameter and usually protruding more from the underside of the leaf. The Plant Parasites of Europe website describes the gall as protruding equally on either side of the leaf. The gall is large in relation to the size of the leaf.

Two species of sawfly create similar galls on dwarf willow and the galls can only be told apart by examining the larva. The larvae of E. herbaceae have black spots (easiest to see in young larva) while the larvae of E. aquilonis does not.

This species along with E. crassipes and E. arbusculae are part of the Euura crassipes subgroup.

== Distribution ==
The gall or sawfly has been recorded from upland Britain and Ireland (common), Finland, Norway, northern Russia and Sweden.
