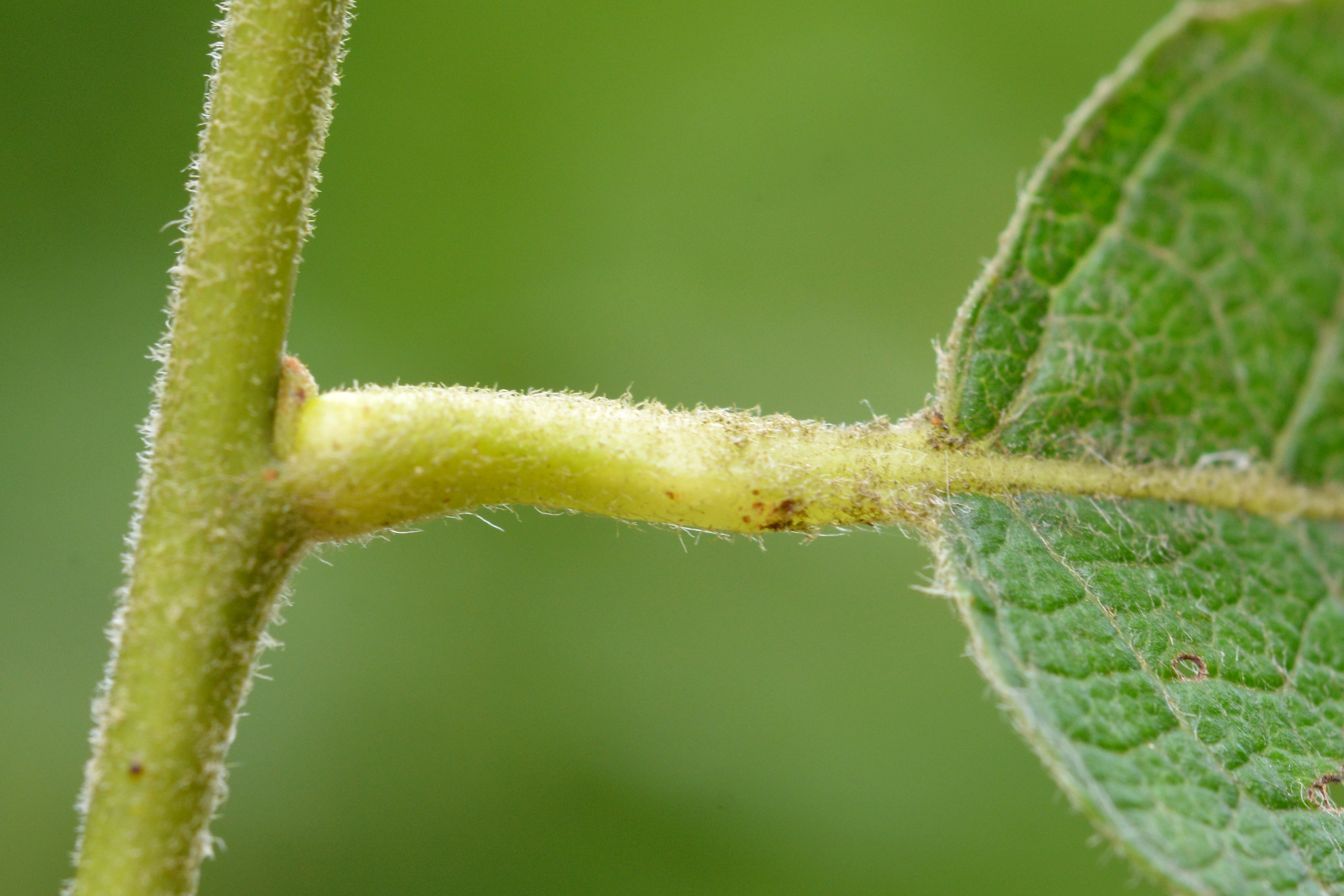
- Gall

Scientific classification
- Domain: Eukaryota
- Kingdom: Animalia
- Phylum: Arthropoda
- Class: Insecta
- Order: Hymenoptera
- Suborder: Symphyta
- Family: Tenthredinidae
- Genus: Euura
- Species: E. venusta

Binomial name
- Euura venusta (Brischke, 1883)

= Euura venusta =

Species of sawfly

Euura venusta is a species of sawfly belonging to the family Tenthredinidae (common sawflies). The larvae feed within the leaf-stalk (or petiole) of willows (Salix species) forming a gall. The sawfly was first described by Carl Gustav Alexander Brischke in 1883.

== Description of the gall ==
The gall is formed in the petiole and is 8–10 mm long and 2–4 mm wide at the base. It contains one larva, along with its frass, and can be found on eared willow (S. aurita), goat willow (S. caprea), grey willow (S. cinerea), downy willow (S. lapponum) and S. silesiaca.

Euura venusta is one of three closely related species known as the Euura amerinae species subgroup. The other member of the group is E. testaceipes (Brischke, 1883).

== Distribution ==
The sawfly has been found in central and northern Europe and the Russian far east, including Armenia, Belgium, Great Britain, Luxembourg, Norway, Russia and Sweden.
