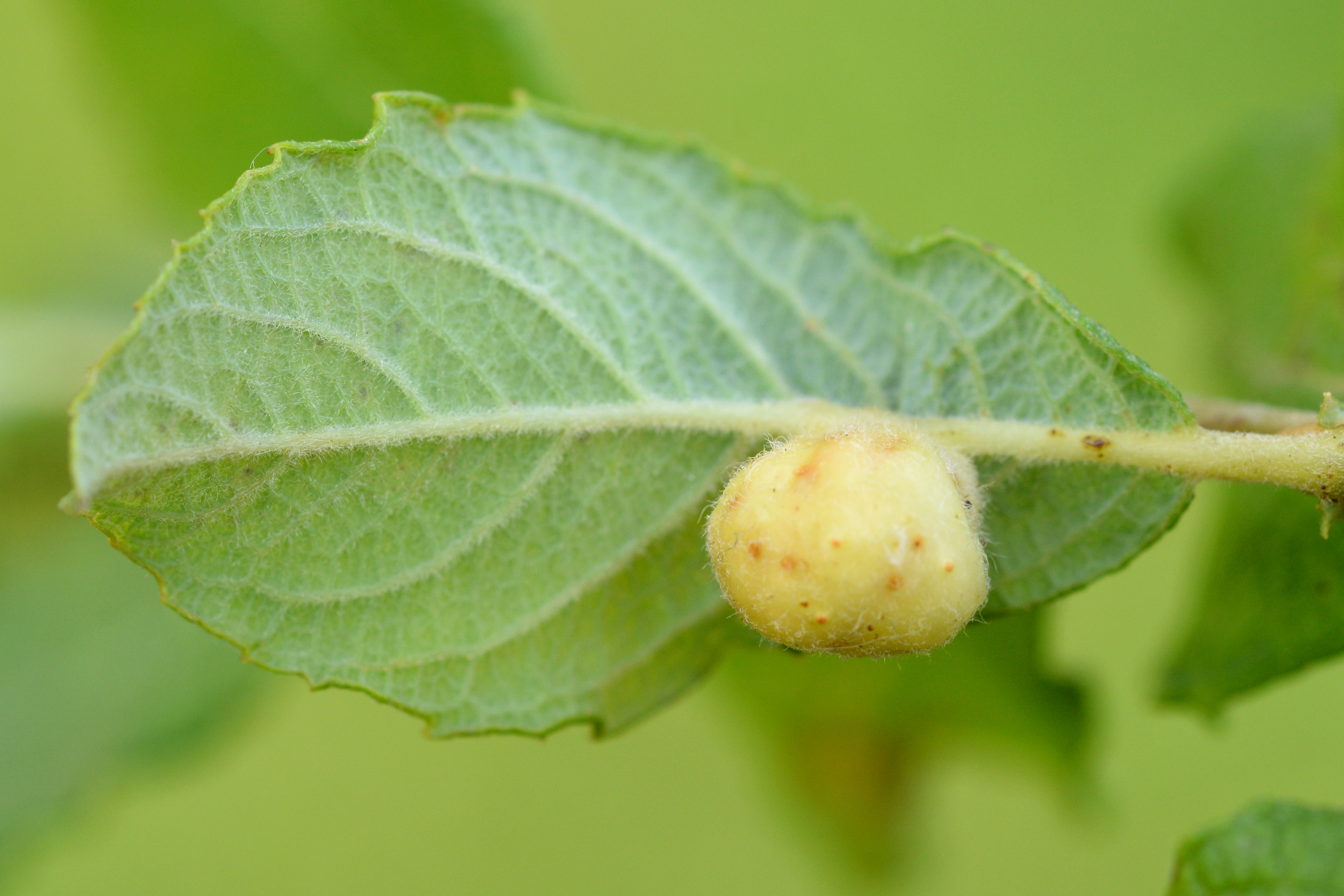
- Gall on Salix cineria

Scientific classification
- Domain: Eukaryota
- Kingdom: Animalia
- Phylum: Arthropoda
- Class: Insecta
- Order: Hymenoptera
- Suborder: Symphyta
- Family: Tenthredinidae
- Genus: Euura
- Species: E. pedunculi

Binomial name
- Euura pedunculi (Hartig, 1837)

Synonyms
- List: Nematus pedunculi Hartig, 1837 Pontania, pedunculi Konow (1890) Pontania (Pontania) pedunculi Viitasaari & Vikberg (1985) Nematus (Pontania) pedunculi Zhelochovtsev (1988) Pontania (Eupontania) pedunculi Lacourt (1999) Eupontania pedunculi Vikberg & Zinovjex (2006) Euura pedunculi Prous et al. (2014) Nematus bellus Zaddach, 1876 Pontania bella Konow (1901a) Pontania (Eupontania) bella Lacourt (1999) ? Namatus baccarum Cameron 1876d Nematus curticornis Cameron, 1885 Pontania curticornis Konow (1890) Pontania bella var. nigrescens Enslin, 1915 Pontania pusilla Lindqvist, 1964 Pontania gallarum Kopelke 1991

= Euura pedunculi =

Species of sawfly

Euura pedunculi is a species of sawfly belonging to the family Tenthredinidae (common sawflies). The larva feed within galls on the leaves of sallows (Salix species). It was first described by Theodor Hartig in 1837.

== Description of the gall ==
The gall is found on the underside of a leaf of the host pant, is globular or ovoid and up to 5 mm. It can be green or yellow, sometimes flushed with a red, can have warts and varying density of hairs. On the upperside of the leaf is a yellowish scar which can be flush with the surface or very slightly raised.

The gall is found on eared willow (S. aurita), goat willow (S. caprea), the hybrid of goat and tea-leaved willow (S. caprea x phylicifolia), grey willow (S. cinerea), S. silesiaca and S. starkeana.

== Distribution ==
This species is found in most of Europe north to Inari, Finland and east to Sakhalin, Russia. The gall is common in Great Britain and Ireland.
