= Euura samolad =

Scientific classification
- Domain: Eukaryota
- Kingdom: Animalia
- Phylum: Arthropoda
- Class: Insecta
- Order: Hymenoptera
- Suborder: Symphyta
- Family: Tenthredinidae
- Genus: Euura
- Species: E. samolad

Binomial name
- Euura samolad (Malais, 1920)

Synonyms
- Pontania samolad Malaise, 1921; Pontania (Pontania) samolad Viitasaari & Vikberg (1985); Pontania (Eupontania) samolad Zinovjev (1993); Eupontania samolad (Malaise, 1921); Euura (Eupontania) samolad Noblecourt (2016)

Species of sawfly

Euura samolad is a species of sawfly belonging to the family Tenthredinidae (common sawflies). The larva feed within galls on the leaves of willows (Salix species). It was first described by René Malaise in 1920.

== Description of the gall ==
The green to bright red, densely hairy gall is found on the underside of a leaf of the host plant. It is pea-sized and has a narrow attachment to the leaves of downy willow (Salix lapponum) or its hybrids.

== Distribution ==
The gall is found in northern Europe, from Scotland, France and Fennoscandia to northern Russia, possibly as far as the far east.
