= Euura aquilonis =

Scientific classification
- Domain: Eukaryota
- Kingdom: Animalia
- Phylum: Arthropoda
- Class: Insecta
- Order: Hymenoptera
- Suborder: Symphyta
- Family: Tenthredinidae
- Genus: Euura
- Species: E. aquilonis

Binomial name
- Euura aquilonis (Benson, 1941)

Synonyms
- List: Pontania aquilonis Benson, 1941 Eupontania aquilonis (Benson, 1941): Vikberg (2003) Pontania algida Benson, 1941 Pontania polaris Kopelke (1989b) Pontania (Eupontania) polaris Zinovjev (1993b)

Species of sawfly

Euura aquilonis is a species of sawfly belonging to the family Tenthredinidae (common sawflies). The larvae feed internally in a gall formed on the leaves of dwarf willow (Salix herbacea) and polar willow (Salix polaris). Galls of E. herbaceae are similar and the larvae need to be examined to tell them apart.

== Description of the gall ==
Descriptions of the gall differ depending on the source. According to Redfern et al. (2011) the thin-walled gall is globular, 4–10 mm diameter and usually protruding more from the underside of the leaf. The Plant Parasites of Europe website describes the gall as protruding equally on either side of the leaf. The gall is large in relation to the size of the leaf. The larvae of E. herbaceae have black spots (easiest to see in young larva) while the larvae of E. aquilonis does not.

== Distribution ==
The gall or sawfly has been recorded from Finland, Norway, Scotland, Slovakia and Sweden.
