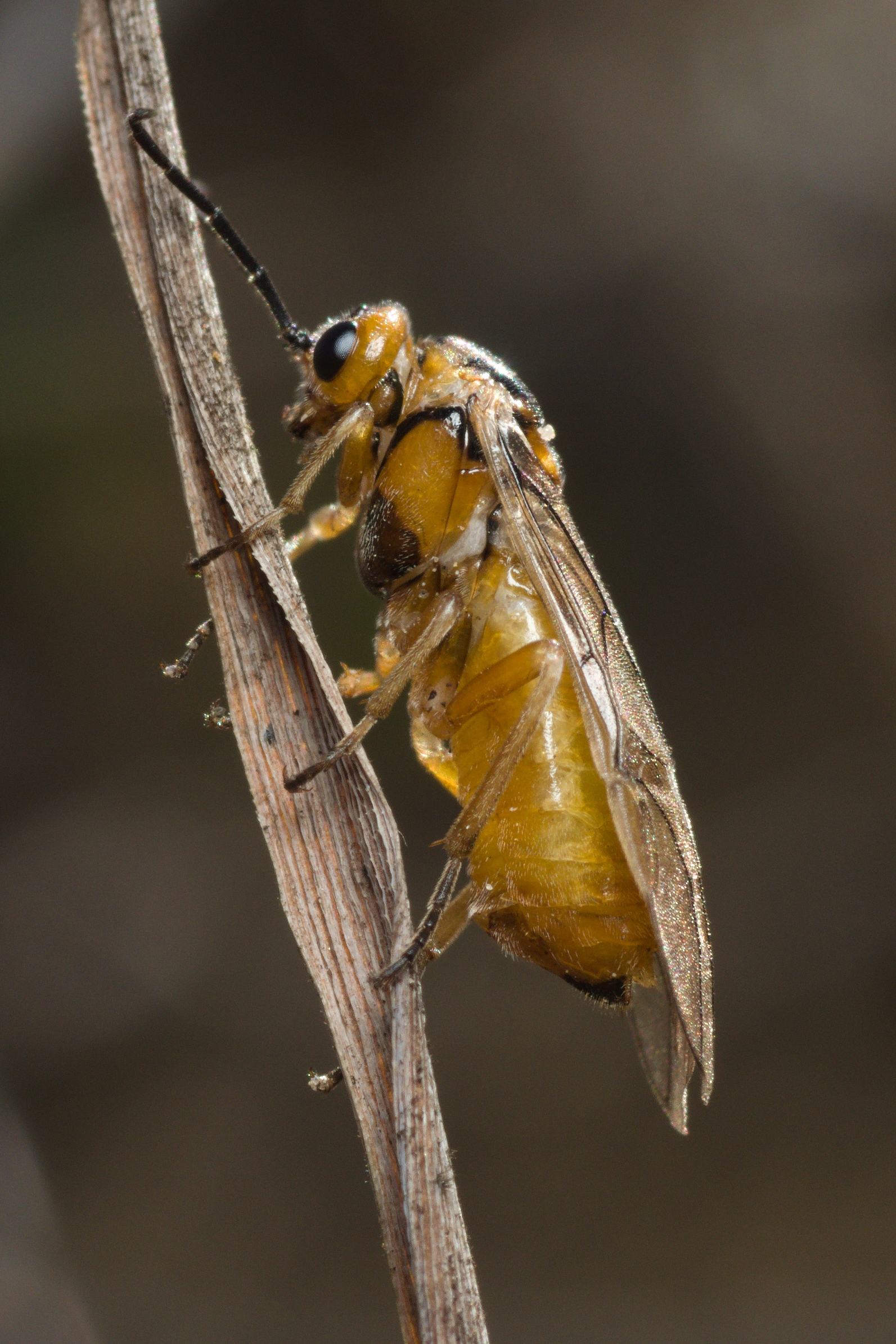
- Euura sp.

Scientific classification
- Kingdom: Animalia
- Phylum: Arthropoda
- Class: Insecta
- Order: Hymenoptera
- Suborder: Symphyta
- Family: Tenthredinidae
- Subfamily: Nematinae
- Genus: Euura; Newman, 1837

Type species
- Euura mucronata (Hartig, 1837)

= Euura =

Genus of sawflies

Euura is a genus of sawflies of the family Tenthredinidae, subfamily Nematinae. Some of the larvae feed externally on plants and some form plant galls on willows (Salix species). In the case of the gall-forming species, when the female lays her eggs she injects a stimulant and the gall starts to form before the eggs hatch. Most sawfly galls are hard and individual larva tend to inhabit the gall, feeding on the tissue and leave the gall to pupate in the soil. Most of the species are monophages (i.e., specific to one species of willow) although the type species, Euura mucronata, is polyphagous feeding on over thirty species of willow.

Most groups of insects tend to have maximum numbers of species in the tropics and decrease towards the poles. The Nematinae reverse this trend with the highest number probably occurring in the boreal forest zone. The reason is not fully understood but could be because of the abundance of species of willow in the region. In the Western Palaearctic all of the species of Euura are attached to Salix species as hosts for their larva. Reports of European species of stem-galling Euura, galling poplar (Populus species) remain unconfirmed, although at least five species in North America do gall poplars.

== Galls ==
A gall is an abnormal growth where the host plants cells enlarge and/or multiply providing food and shelter for the gall-causer. Most gall-causers stick to one host species, or a group which are closely related and tend to cause short-term, localised damage to their host plant. Unlike most gall insects where the development of the gall is a response to the immature stages living in the gall, females of Euura species inject a substance during oviposition which starts the growth of the gall. The female secretions have led taxonomists to consider gall-inducing species of sawfly to be highly host specific.

One hypothesis for the evolution of galls is, they may have started with the larvae of an ancestor that either folded or rolled leaves, culminating in E. atra; which does not usually induce a gall but taxonomically belongs to the gall species. The first publication of a sawfly gall was by Francesco Redi in 1668 with illustrations of E. proxima. Antonie van Leeuwenhoek wrote numerous letters to the Royal Society including one on ″growths on the leaves of willows″. The early researchers sometimes mistook parasitoids emerging from the galls as the gall-makers. Reaumur (1737) was possibly the first to correctly identify a sawfly as a galler, based on the morphology of the larvae.

Until recently the taxonomy of gall-forming Euura was based mostly on the morphology of the adults and the larvae often lived on a wide range of Salix species. From the 1980s onwards Jens-Peter Kopelke argued that each sawfly species was strictly monophagous i.e. feeds on a single species. Kopelke and other taxonomists have since described many new species, although it is not universally agreed and it is argued that some recently described species are considered to be host plant races. The reason being there are only small genetic and morphological differences, which are not enough evidence to treat them as separate species.

In 2014 gall-inducing species, on willow, of Eupontania, Phyllocolpa, Pontania and Tubpontania were placed in the Euura, reflecting advances in the understanding of their phylogeny. Free-feeding species were also transferred.

== Species ==
- Euura abortiva
- Euura acuminata
- Euura acutifoliae (Zinovjev, 1985)
- Euura acutiserra {Lindqvist, 1949}
- Euura amerinae (Linnaeus, 1758)
- Euura anglica (Cameron, 1877) comb. nov.
- Euura angusta
- Euura anomaloptera (Förster, 1854)
- Euura aquilonis (Benson, 1941) comb. nov.
- Euura arbusculae (Benson, 1941) comb. nov.
- Euura arctica
- Euura arcticornis (Konow, 1904)
- Euura atra (Jurine, 1807)
- Euura auritae Kopelke, 2000
- Euura bigallae (Vikberg & Zinovjev, 2014) comb. nov.
- Euura boreoalpina Kopelke, 2001
- Euura brevicornis (Förster, 1854)
- Euura breweriae
- Euura bridgmanii (Cameron, 1883)
- Euura butleri
- Euura calais (W.F. Kirby, 1882)
- Euura cinereae Kopelke, 1996
- Euura collactanea (Förster, 1854)
- Euura cooperae
- Euura cosensii
- Euura crassipes (Thomson, 1871)
- Euura cynips
- Euura cyrnea (Liston, 2005)
- Euura daphnoidica Kopelke, 2001
- Euura delicatula (MacGillivray, 1919) comb. nov.
- Euura destricta (MacGillivray, 1923) comb. nov.
- Euura dolichura (Thomson, 1871)
- Euura elaeagnos
- Euura exiguae
- Euura femoralis (Cameron, 1876) comb. nov.
- Euura flavipes
- Euura gallae
- Euura gallarum (Hartig, 1837)
- Euura gemmacinereae Kopelke, 2001
- Euura gemmafoetidae Kopelke, 2001
- Euura gemmahelveticae Kopelke, 2001
- Euura gemmarum
- Euura gemmura
- Euura geyerianae
- Euura glabrifrons (Benson, 1941) comb. nov.
- Euura glaucae Kopelke, 1994 comb. nov.
- Euura hastatae Malaise, 1921
- Euura hastatavora (Vikberg, 2014)
- Euura herbaceae (Cameron, 1876) comb. nov.
- Euura hoppingi
- Euura insularis
- Euura ischnocera (Thomson, 1863
- Euura kincaidi
- Euura kriechbaumeri (Konow, 1901) comb. nov.
- Euura laeta (Brischke, 1883)
- Euura lanatae Malaise, 1921
- Euura lappo Malaise, 1921
- Euura lasiokpis
- Euura lasiolepis
- Euura lemmoniae
- Euura leucapsis (Tischbein, 1846)
- Euura leucosticta (Hartig, 1837)
- Euura longiserra
- Euura medullarius
- Euura megacephala (Rohwer, 1908) spec. rev., comb. nov.
- Euura mexicana
- Euura moenia
- Euura mucronata (Hartig, 1837)
- Euura myrsiniticola Kopelke, 1991 comb nov
- Euura myrsinifoliae Kopelke, 2001
- Euura myrtilloides Kopelke, 1996
- Euura myrtilloidica Kopelke, 1991 comb. nov.
- Euura nigra
- Euura nigrella
- Euura nigricantis (Kopelke, 1986) comb. nov.
- Euura nigritarsis
- Euura nitidinota (Vikberg, 2010) comb. nov.
- Euura nivalis (Vikberg, 1970) comb. nov.
- Euura nudipectus (Vikberg, 1965) comb. nov.
- Euura oblita (Audinet-Serville, 1823)
- Euura orbitalis
- Euura pacifica
- Euura pedunculi (Hartig, 1837)
- Euura perturbans
- Euura petandrae
- Euura phylicifoliae Kopelke, 2001
- Euura piliserra (Thomson), 1863
- Euura plicadaphnoides Kopelke, 2007
- Euura plicalapponum Kopelke, 2007 comb. nov.
- Euura plicaphylicifolia Kopelke, 2007 comb. nov.
- Euura polita (Zaddach, 1883)
- Euura proxima (Serville, 1823)
- Euura polita (Zaddach, 1883)
- Euura prussica (Zaddach, 1883)
- Euura purpureae (Cameron, 1884)
- Euura pustulator (Forsius, 1923) comb. nov.
- Euura reticulatae (Malaise, 1921)
- Euura saliceti
- Euura salicicola
- Euura salicis
- Euura saliciscinereae (Retzius, 1783)
- Euura salicisnodus
- Euura salicispurpureae Kopelke, 2014
- Euura salicisovum
- Euura samolad (Malaise, 1921)
- Euura scotaspis (Förster, 1854)
- Euura scoulerianae
- Euura serissimae
- Euura shibayanagii
- Euura soboensis
- Euura subgemma Liston, 2006
- Euura testaceipes (Brischke, 1883)
- Euura triandrae (Benson, 1941)
- Euura unigallae (Vikberg & Zinovjev, 2014) comb. nov.
- Euura vesicator (Bremi-Wolf, 1849)
- Euura venusta (Brischke, 1883)
- Euura viminalis (Linnaeus, 1758)
- Euura virilis (Zirngiebl, 1955)
- Euura weiffenbachiella Liston & Vikberg, 2017

No longer considered a species

- Euura lapponica Kopelke, 1996, is now a synonym of Euura crassipes
