= Euura mucronata =

Scientific classification
- Domain: Eukaryota
- Kingdom: Animalia
- Phylum: Arthropoda
- Class: Insecta
- Order: Hymenoptera
- Suborder: Symphyta
- Family: Tenthredinidae
- Genus: Euura
- Species: E. mucronata

Binomial name
- Euura mucronata (Hartig, 1837)

Synonyms
- Euura gemmacinereae Kopelke, 2001; Euura nigritarsis Cameron, 1885; Euura saliceti auct. nec Fallén, 1808

Species of sawfly

Euura mucronata is a species of sawfly belonging to the family Tenthredinidae (common sawflies). The larva feed within galls on the buds of willows (Salix species). It was first described by Theodor Hartig in 1837.

== Description ==
The bud of the host species is about twice the normal size and pear-shape. The greenish larva feeds within the gall which also contains frass and the bud falls to the ground in the autumn where the larva pupates. Several buds on the same shoot can be galled and the insect has a single generation per year (i.e. univoltine). Most species of Euura are monophagous on Salix species but there is some discussion on whether Euura mucronata is a group of closely related species, each feeding on different Salix species, or whether it is polyphagous feeding on over thirty species of willow.

== Distribution ==
Euura mucronata is found in Europe from Ireland, east to Ukraine and from Norway, south to Portugal.
