= Euura dolichura =

Scientific classification
- Domain: Eukaryota
- Kingdom: Animalia
- Phylum: Arthropoda
- Class: Insecta
- Order: Hymenoptera
- Suborder: Symphyta
- Family: Tenthredinidae
- Genus: Euura
- Species: E. dolichura

Binomial name
- Euura dolichura (C G Thomson, 1871)

Synonyms
- Nemarus dolichura C.G. Thomson, 1871; Pontania dolichura (Thomson); Pontania lapponicola Kopelke, 1994.

Species of sawfly

Euura dolichura is a species of sawfly belonging to the family Tenthredinidae (common sawflies). It was first described by Carl Gustaf Thomson in 1871. The larvae feed within galls on the leaves of willow (Salix species). Some of the Euura species of sawfly are closely related and placed in groups of similar species. E. dolichura is a member of the Euura dolichura species group.

== Description of the gall ==
The sausage-shaped gall (10 mm x 2 mm), greenish, pink or purplish, is usually in pairs, either side of the midrib and on the upper side of the leaf. On the lower side of the leaf, it is flush with the surface. Inside the gall is a single caterpillar, along with frass.

There is some disagreement in the literature as to which species of willow is galled. According to Redfern et al. (2011) the gall is found on tea-leaved willow (Salix phylicifolia) while Ellis (Plant Parasites of Europe) and Liston et al. disagree and cite downy willow (Salix lapponum) as the foodplant of the larvae.

Euura dolichura is one of seven closely related species known as the Euura dolichura species group. The others members of the group are,

- E. bigallae (Vikberg & Zinovjev, 2014) comb.nov.
- E. femoralis (Cameron, 1876) comb.nov.
- E. glaucae (Kopelke, 1994) comb.nov.
- E. nigricantis (Kopelke, 1986) comb.nov.
- E. unigallae (Vikberg & Zinovjev, 2014) comb.nov.
- E. virilis (Zirngiebl, 1955)

== Distribution ==
In Europe this species had been recorded from the Czech Republic, Finland, Great Britain (England and Scotland), Norway and Sweden. It has also been recorded from Japan and possibly from North America.
