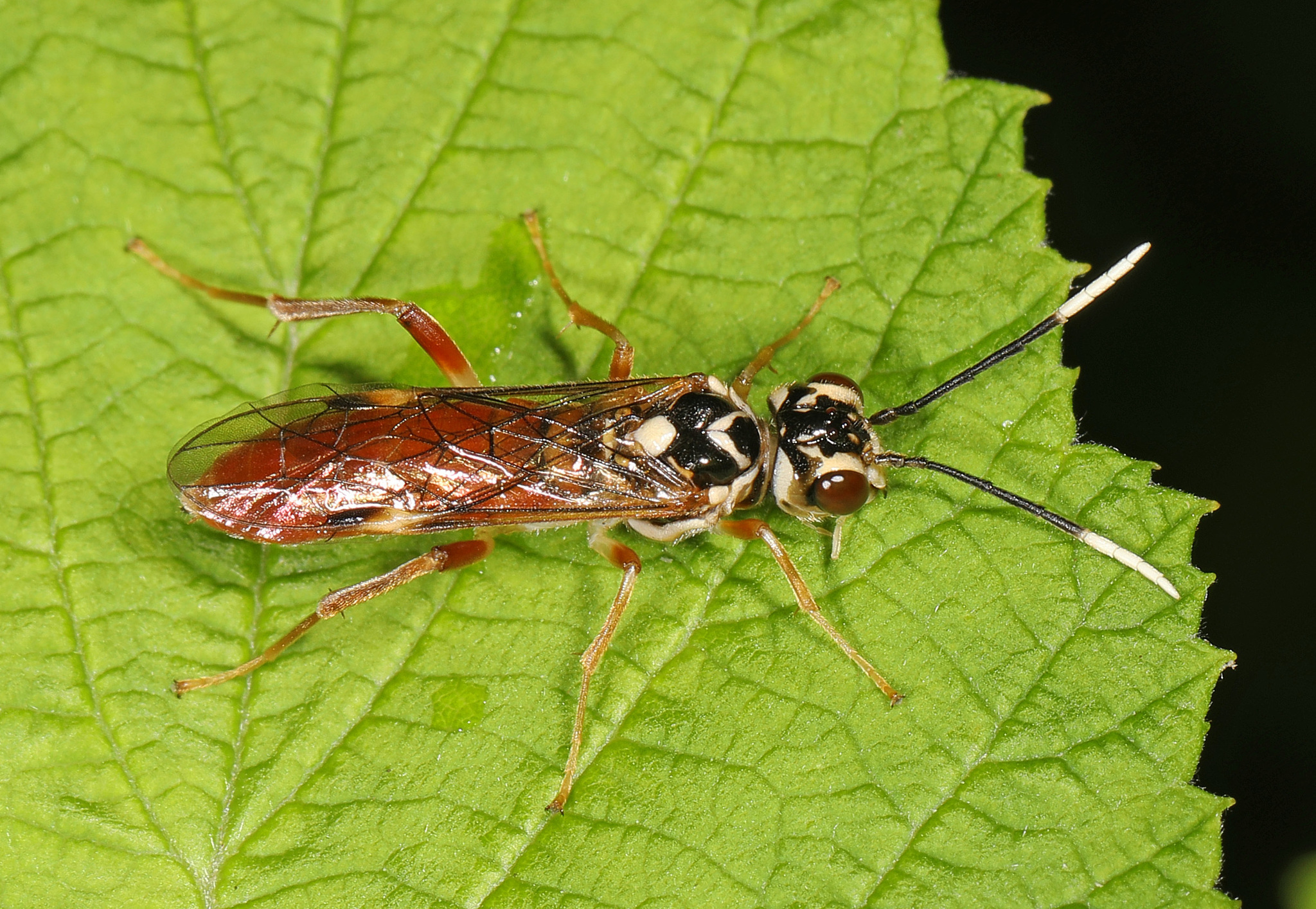
- Taxonus pallidicornis, Virginia

Scientific classification
- Kingdom: Animalia
- Phylum: Arthropoda
- Clade: Pancrustacea
- Class: Insecta
- Order: Hymenoptera
- Suborder: Symphyta
- Family: Tenthredinidae
- Tribe: Allantini
- Genus: Taxonus; Hartig, 1837

= Taxonus =

Genus of sawflies

Taxonus is a genus of common sawflies in the family Tenthredinidae. There are more than 70 described species in Taxonus, found mainly in Asia, North America, and Europe.

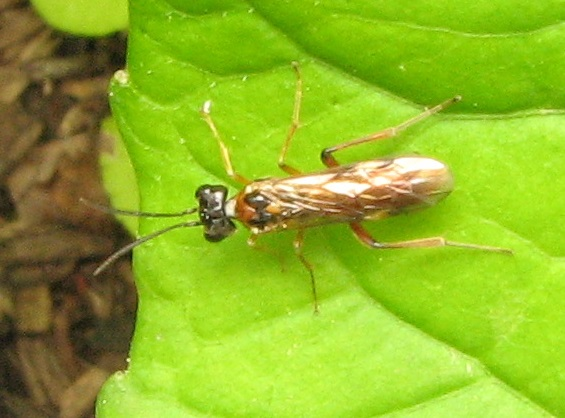
Taxonus pallipes

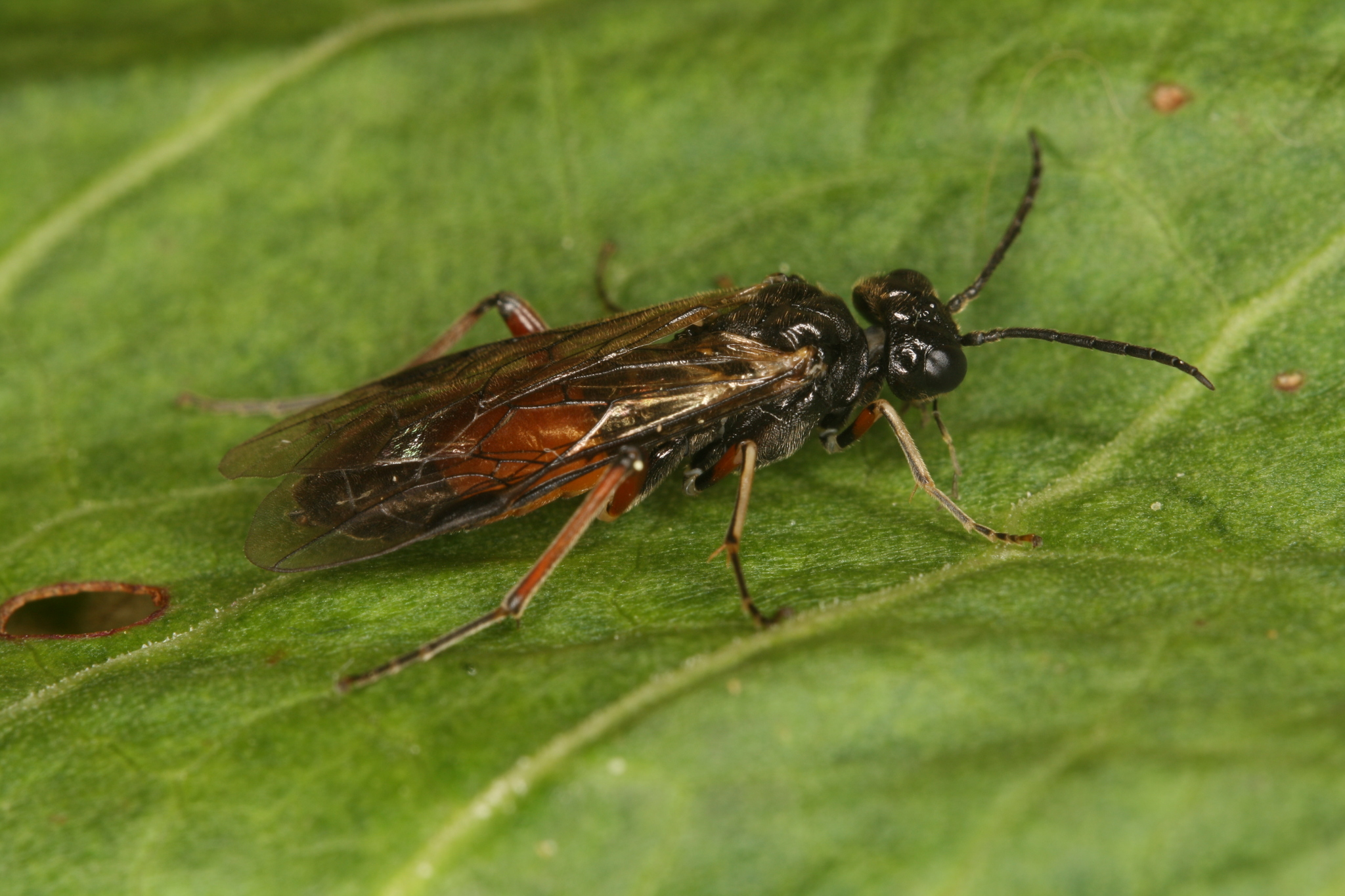
Taxonus agrorum, Austria

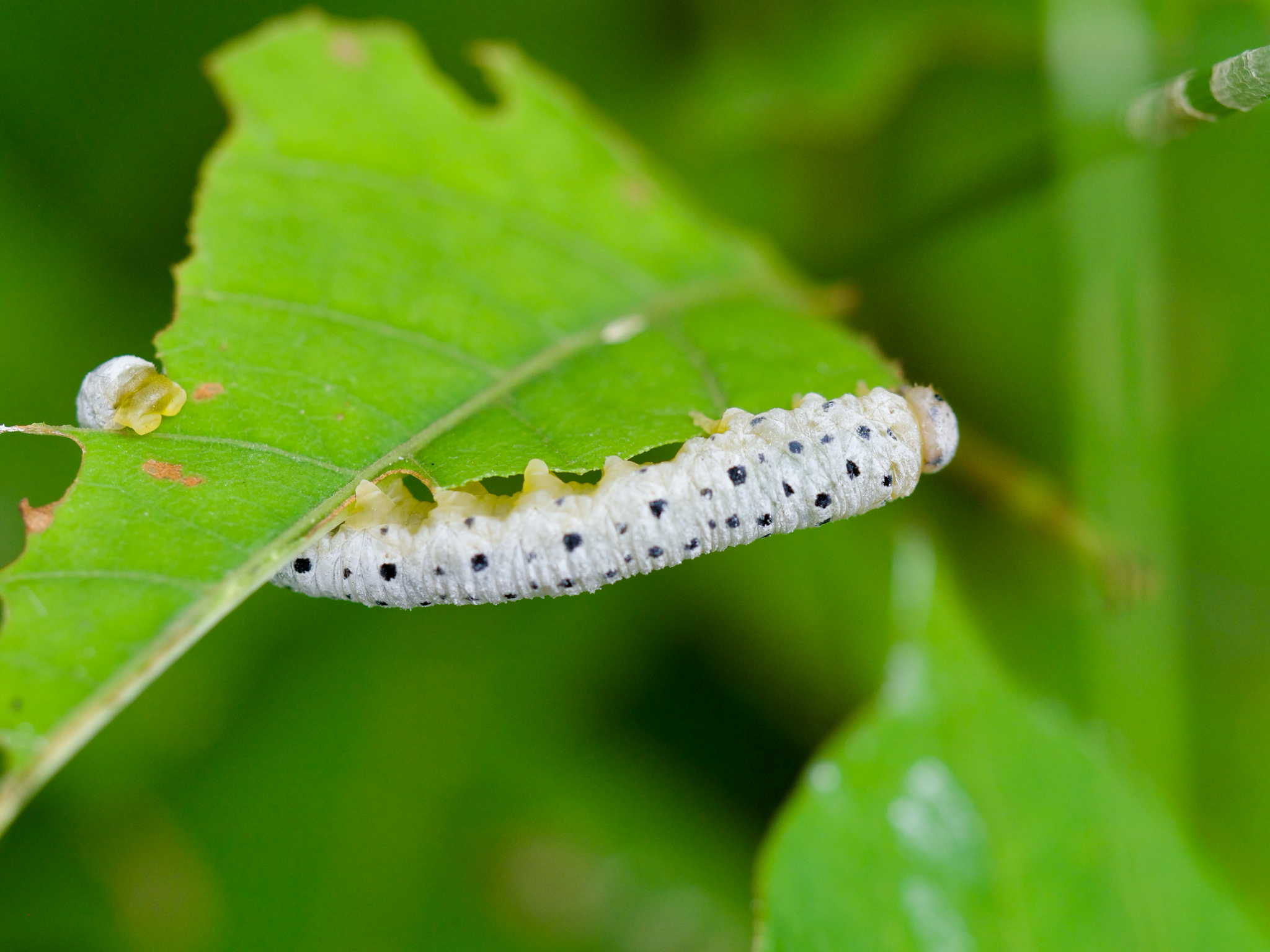
Taxonus fluvicornis, Japan

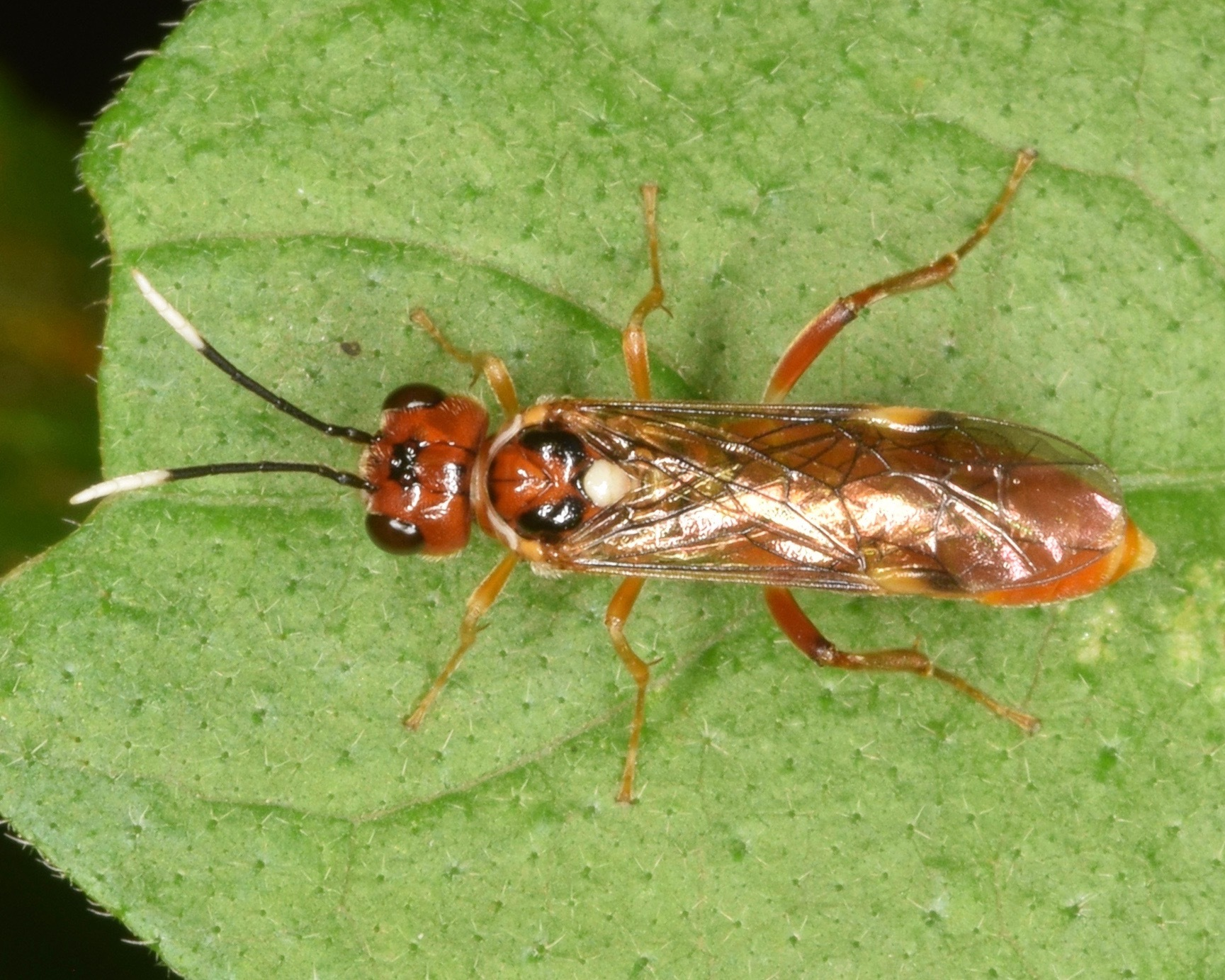
Taxonus terminalis, Georgia

== Species ==
These species belong to the genus Taxonus .

- Taxonus abdominis Lee & Ryu, 1996
- Taxonus agrorum (Fall‚ 1808)
- Taxonus albiventris Togashi, 2000
- Taxonus alboclypea (Wei, 1997)
- Taxonus albocollinia Wei, 1998
- Taxonus alboscutellatus Niezabitowski, 1899
- Taxonus albotemplis Haris, 2014
- Taxonus annulicornis Takeuchi, 1940
- Taxonus arisanus (Takeuchi, 1927)
- Taxonus aterritina Wei, 1997
- Taxonus attenatus Rohwer, 1921
- Taxonus autumnalis (Takeuchi, 1929)
- Taxonus bellus (Takeuchi, 1929)
- Taxonus borealis MacGillivray, 1895
- Taxonus carbonarius Takeuchi, 1929
- Taxonus chuanshanicus Wei, 1997
- Taxonus compressicornis Wei, 1998
- Taxonus delumbis Konow, 1900
- Taxonus epicera (Say, 1836)
- Taxonus ferrugatus Wei, 1997
- Taxonus flavicornis Wei, 1997
- Taxonus flavoantennatus Haris, 2015
- Taxonus fletcheri Forsius, 1931
- Taxonus fluvicornis Matsumura, 1912
- Taxonus formosacola (Rohwer, 1916)
- Taxonus foveifrons Cameron, 1902
- Taxonus fulvipes Cameron, 1899
- Taxonus hakusanus Togashi, 2000
- Taxonus huangleii Wei, Liao & N. Huang, 2007
- Taxonus hunanensis Wei & N. Huang, 2007
- Taxonus immarginervis (Malaise, 1957)
- Taxonus japonicus Takeuchi, 1929
- Taxonus labiatus Cameron, 1902
- Taxonus laoensis Haris, 2014
- Taxonus leucocoxus Wei & Nie, 1998
- Taxonus leucotrochantera (Wei, 1997)
- Taxonus linealina Wei & Huang, 2010
- Taxonus liui Wei & Niu, 2009
- Taxonus minomensis (Takeuchi, 1929)
- Taxonus miyokoae Togashi, 2003
- Taxonus montanus Togashi, 1992
- Taxonus nortoni Scudder, 1890
- Taxonus octopunctatus (Takeuchi, 1928)
- Taxonus pallicoxus (Provancher, 1885)
- Taxonus pallidicornis (Norton, 1868)
- Taxonus pallipes (Say, 1823)
- Taxonus proximus (Provancher, 1885)
- Taxonus punun Takeuchi, 1933
- Taxonus qinlinginus Wei, 1998
- Taxonus rubroscapus Haris, 2014
- Taxonus rufithorax Wei, 2003
- Taxonus rufocinctus (Norton, 1860)
- Taxonus rufothoracinus (Wei, 1998)
- Taxonus sanctifloriani Haris, 2014
- Taxonus serratus Togashi, 2000
- Taxonus shanicus (Malaise, 1957)
- Taxonus shinoharai Togashi, 2009
- Taxonus shiritakanus Togashi, 2000
- Taxonus smerinthus Wei, 2003
- Taxonus spiculatus (MacGillivray, 1908)
- Taxonus sticticus (Klug, 1817)
- Taxonus takeuchii Wei, 1997
- Taxonus tenuicornis (Takeuchi, 1929)
- Taxonus terminalis (Say, 1824)
- Taxonus tianmunicus Wei & Nie, 1998
- Taxonus tsunekii Togashi, 2000
- Taxonus verticina Wei & Huang, 2010
- Taxonus vetustus (Heer, 1849)
- Taxonus zhangi (Wei, 1997)
- Taxonus zhelochovtsevi Viitasaari & Zinovjev, 1991
- Taxonus zoui Wei, 2010
