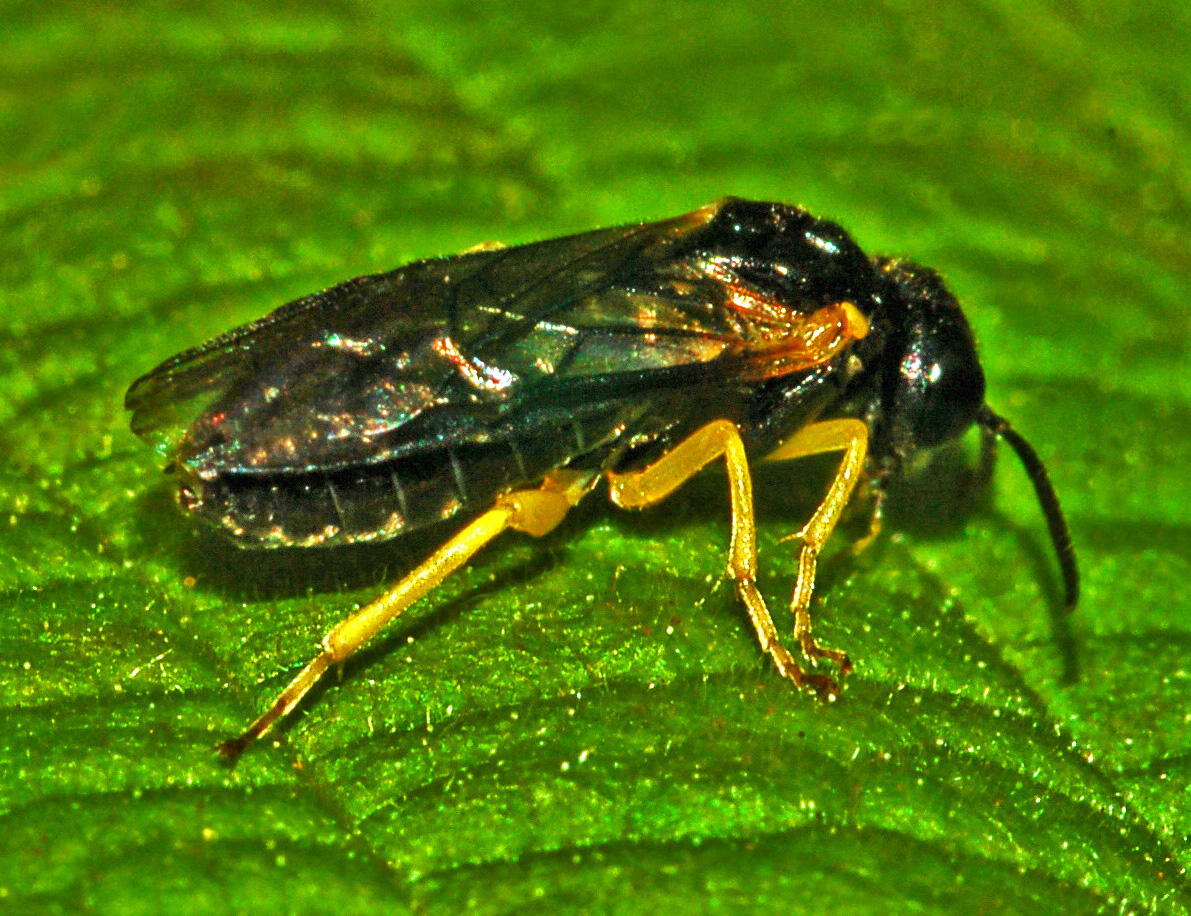
- Aneugmenus padi

Scientific classification
- Kingdom: Animalia
- Phylum: Arthropoda
- Clade: Pancrustacea
- Class: Insecta
- Order: Hymenoptera
- Suborder: Symphyta
- Family: Tenthredinidae
- Genus: Aneugmenus; Hartig, 1837

= Aneugmenus =

Genus of sawflies

Aneugmenus is a genus of sawfly (order Hymenoptera, family Tenthredinidae).

== Species ==
- Aneugmenus bibolinii Zombori, 1979
- Aneugmenus coronatus (Klug, 1814)
- Aneugmenus flavipes (Norton, 1861)
- Aneugmenus fuerstenbergensis (Konow, 1885)
- Aneugmenus oertzeni (Konow, 1887)
- Aneugmenus padi (Linnaeus, 1761)
- Aneugmenus scutellatus Smith
- Aneugmenus temporalis (Thomson, 1871)
