= Euura myrsiniticola =

Scientific classification
- Domain: Eukaryota
- Kingdom: Animalia
- Phylum: Arthropoda
- Class: Insecta
- Order: Hymenoptera
- Suborder: Symphyta
- Family: Tenthredinidae
- Genus: Euura
- Species: E. myrsiniticola

Binomial name
- Euura myrsiniticola (Kopelke, 1991)

Synonyms
- Pontania myrsiniticola Kopelke, 1991; Pontania (Eupontania) myrsiniticola Zinovjev (1993b); Eupontania myrsiniticola Vikberg (2003)

Species of sawfly

Euura myrsiniticola is a species of sawfly belonging to the family Tenthredinidae (common sawflies). The larvae feed internally in a gall formed on the leaves of whortle-leaved willow (Salix myrsinites).

== Description of the gall ==
The pea-sized gall is smooth and globular and occurs on whortle-leaved willow (Salix myrsinites). It is large in relation to the size of the leaf and protrudes approximately one-third above the leaf surface, and two-thirds below.

== Distribution ==
The gall or sawfly has been recorded from Finland, Norway, Russia (Kolguyev Island), Scotland and Sweden.
