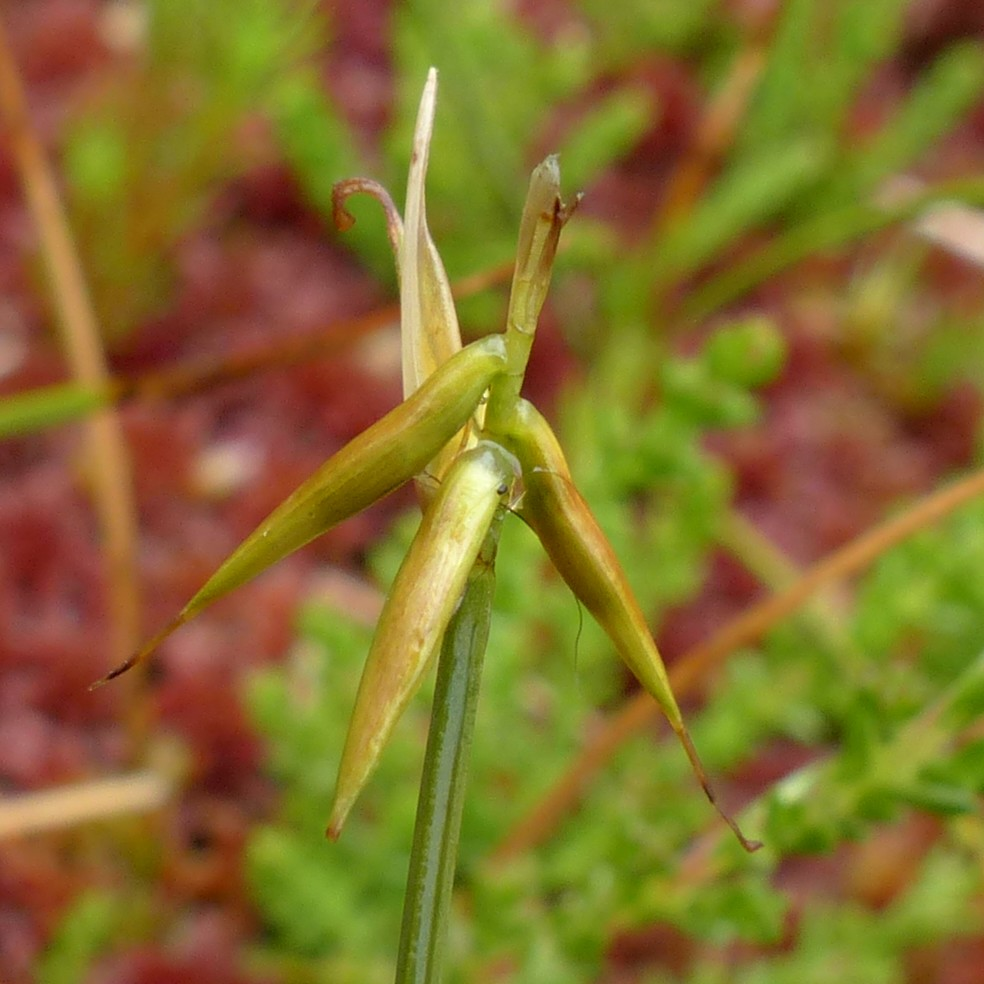

Conservation status
- Least Concern (IUCN 3.1)

Scientific classification
- Kingdom: Plantae
- Clade: Tracheophytes
- Clade: Angiosperms
- Clade: Monocots
- Clade: Commelinids
- Order: Poales
- Family: Cyperaceae
- Genus: Carex
- Species: C. pauciflora

Binomial name
- Carex pauciflora Lightf.

= Carex pauciflora =

Species of grass-like plant

Carex pauciflora, the few-flowered sedge, is a perennial species of sedge in the family Cyperaceae native to bogs and fens in cool temperate, subarctic, and mountainous regions of the Northern Hemisphere. The specific epithet pauciflora refers to the Latin term for 'few flowered'.

== Description ==
Carex pauciflora grows to 60 centimetres (24 in) tall at most, although it more commonly grows to 10–40 centimetres (3.9–15.7 in) tall. It is a rhizomatous perennial with culms that grow alone or in diffuse clusters. A survey of populations in Estonia assessed a mean rhizome length of 4.1 centimetres (1.6 in), although rhizomes up to 35 centimetres (14 in) long have been recorded. The blades may be up to 13 centimetres (5.1 in) long and 1.6 millimetres (0.063 in) wide, and no more than three blades occur on each culm. Every part of the plant is hairless.

Each flower only contains either male or female reproductive structures, although the plants themselves are monoecious. Each culm bears only one spike, with female flowers located below the male flowers on the spike. Female flowers may be less well-developed in unfavorable habitats.

Carex pauciflora seeds are dispersed mechanically. The perigynium is launched outward when it comes into contact with an object and tissue at its base is compressed, which then acts as a spring when the pressure is released.

== Distribution and habitat ==
Carex pauciflora has a circumboreal distribution, occurring in cool temperate and subarctic areas throughout the Northern Hemisphere. It grows in bogs and other wet areas with acidic soil. It is known to occur at elevations ranging from 75–1,390 metres (246–4,560 ft) in the US state of Washington where it is classified as S2 (imperiled) by NatureServe, although it is classified globally as a species of least concern by the IUCN Red List. Populations are known from every Canadian province or territory except Nunavut, although its presence was only discovered in the Northwest Territory in 2013, at a site near Fort Simpson. In Ukraine it is present in bogs and fens in the Carpathians and in the Ovruch Raion of the Zhytomyr Oblast near the border with Belarus.

Recreational activity threatens some populations in North America. The species has declined in Estonia due to development of its wetland habitats, although it has not been as severely impacted as some other sedge species. Populations in the Ukrainian Carpathians are threatened by climate change. The bogs that Carex pauciflora inhabits in the Ukrainian Carpathians are drying out and being invaded by shrubs, and fens that the sedge also inhabits are being invaded by trees and shrubs such as Pinus mugo, Alnus alnobetula, Salix silesiaca, and Picea abies. Manual removal of more competitive non-wetland plants has been suggested as a conservation measure.
