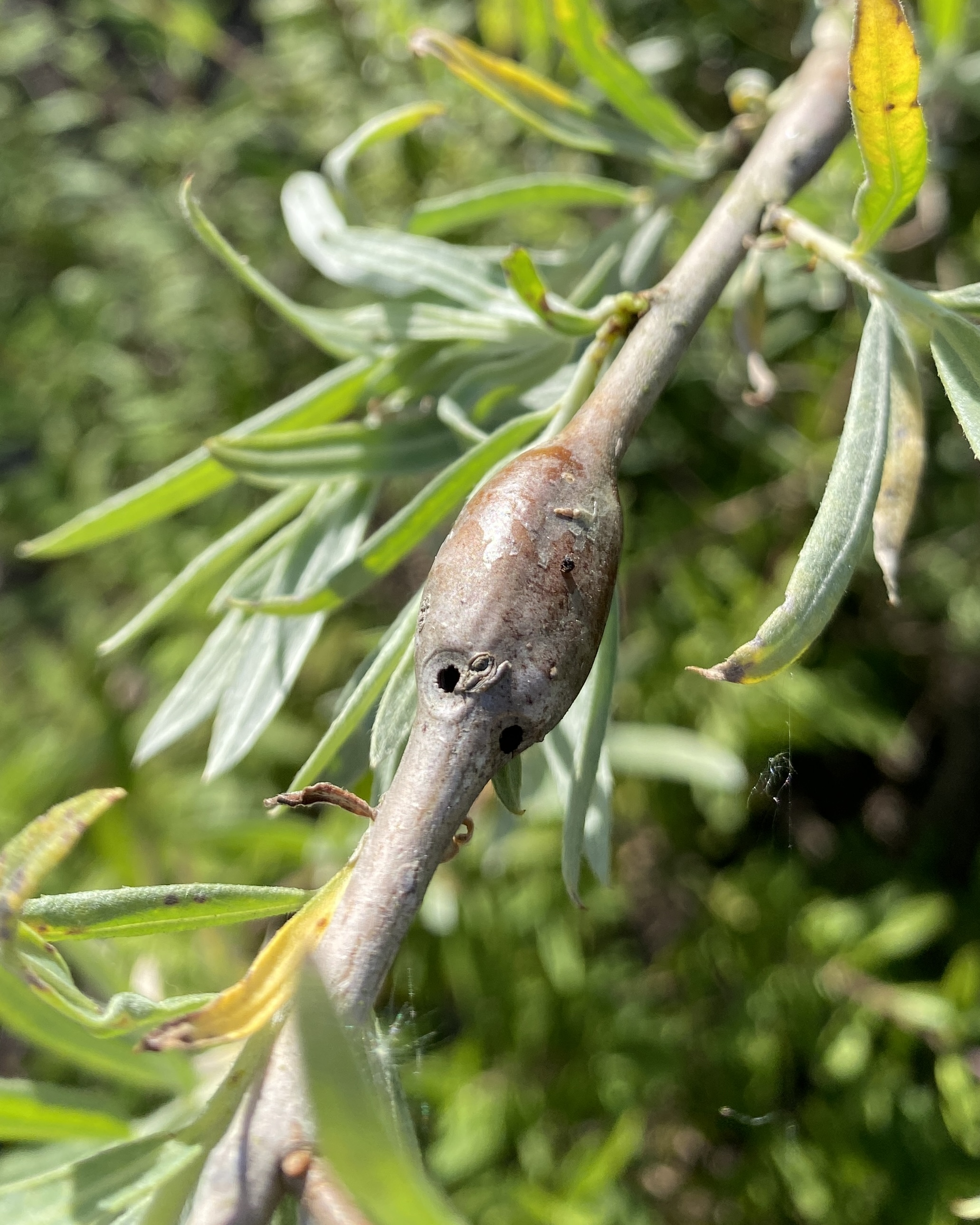

Scientific classification
- Domain: Eukaryota
- Kingdom: Animalia
- Phylum: Arthropoda
- Class: Insecta
- Order: Hymenoptera
- Suborder: Symphyta
- Family: Tenthredinidae
- Genus: Euura
- Species: E. exiguae

Binomial name
- Euura exiguae Smith, 1968

= Euura exiguae =

Species of sawfly

Euura exiguae is a species of gall-inducing North American sawfly. E. exiguae, one of several Euura species that induce integral stem galls on willow species, uses narrow leaf willow (Salix exigua) and dusky willow (Salix melanopsis) as a host.
