= Euura pustulator =

Scientific classification
- Domain: Eukaryota
- Kingdom: Animalia
- Phylum: Arthropoda
- Class: Insecta
- Order: Hymenoptera
- Suborder: Symphyta
- Family: Tenthredinidae
- Genus: Euura
- Species: E. pustulator

Binomial name
- Euura pustulator (Forsius, 1923)

Synonyms
- Pontania pustulator Forsius, 1923; Pontania (Eupontania) pustulator Zinovjev (1985); Pontania (Pontania) pustulator Viitasaari & Vikberg (1985); Nematus (Pontania) pustulator Zhelochovtsev (1988); Eupontania pustulator Vikberg & Zinovjev (2006)

Species of sawfly

Euura pustulator is a species of sawfly belonging to the family Tenthredinidae (common sawflies). The larvae feed internally in a gall formed on the leaves of tea-leaved willow (Salix phylicifolia) and diamondleaf willow (Salix pulchra).

== Description of the gall ==
The thin-walled gall is ovoid, bladder-like, usually green and may broaden the leaf. It is 11 mm long and 5 mm across and is found on tea-leaved willow (S. phylicifolia) and diamondleaf willow (S. pulchra).

Euura pustulator is one of two closely related species in the Euura vesicator subgroup; the other being E. vesicator.

== Distribution ==
The sawfly has been recorded from Finland, Great Britain (northern England and Scotland), Russia, Slovakia and Sweden.
