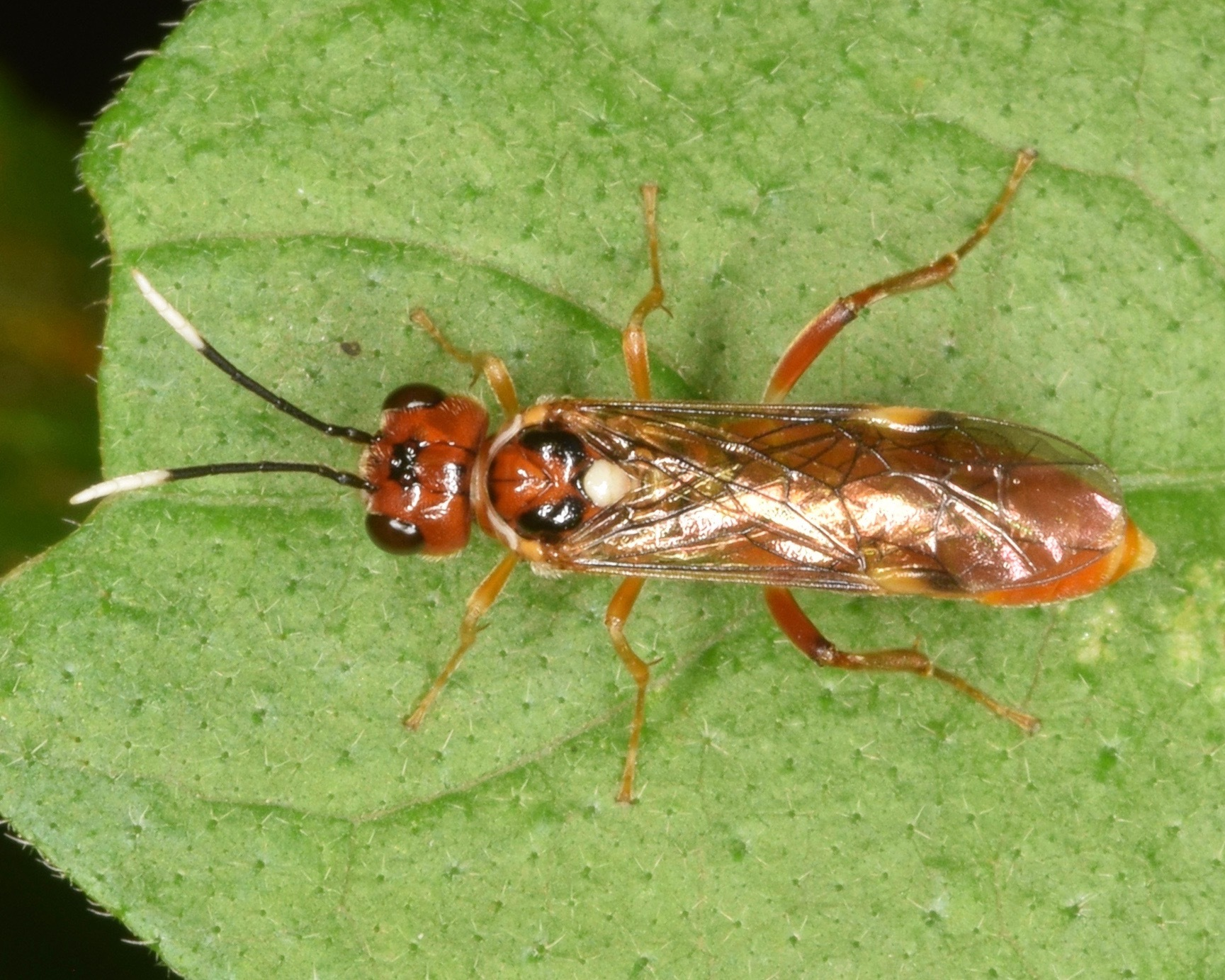
- Taxonus terminalis, Georgia

Scientific classification
- Kingdom: Animalia
- Phylum: Arthropoda
- Clade: Pancrustacea
- Class: Insecta
- Order: Hymenoptera
- Suborder: Symphyta
- Family: Tenthredinidae
- Genus: Taxonus
- Species: T. terminalis

Binomial name
- Taxonus terminalis (Say, 1824)

= Taxonus terminalis =

Species of sawfly

Taxonus terminalis is a species of common sawfly in the family Tenthredinidae. It is found mainly in North America east of the Rocky Mountains.
