= Euura amerinae =

Scientific classification
- Kingdom: Animalia
- Phylum: Arthropoda
- Class: Insecta
- Order: Hymenoptera
- Suborder: Symphyta
- Family: Tenthredinidae
- Genus: Euura
- Species: E. amerinae

Binomial name
- Euura amerinae (Linnaeus, 1758)

Synonyms
- Cynips amerinae Linnaeus 1758; Cryptocampus amerinae Konow (1890)

Species of sawfly

Euura amerinae is a species of sawfly belonging to the family Tenthredinidae (common sawflies). The larvae form galls on bay willow (Salix pentandra). It was first described by Carl Linnaeus in 1758.

== Description ==
The gall is a globular swelling, up to 15 millimetres (0.59 in) wide and 20–30 millimetres (0.79–1.18 in) long, on the shoots of bay willow (Salix pentandra). As the gall matures the surface becomes cracked. According to Redfern et al. (2011) the gall contains one or several larvae in indistinct chambers, while the website Plant Parasites of Europe suggests the galls have circa four cells, each with a single larva and Liston et al. (2017) state that several larvae normally inhabit the gall. E. piliserra and this species are the only European gall-inducing sawfly with several larvae in a single gall. Pupation takes place in the gall.

E. amerinae is one of three closely related species known as the Euura amerinae species subgroup. The other members of the group are E. venusta (Brischke, 1883) and E. testaceipes (Brischke, 1883).

== Distribution ==
The insect or gall has been recorded from Europe (Czech Republic, Finland, Germany, Great Britain, Ireland, the Netherlands, Norway and Sweden) through to the northern Russian Far East.
