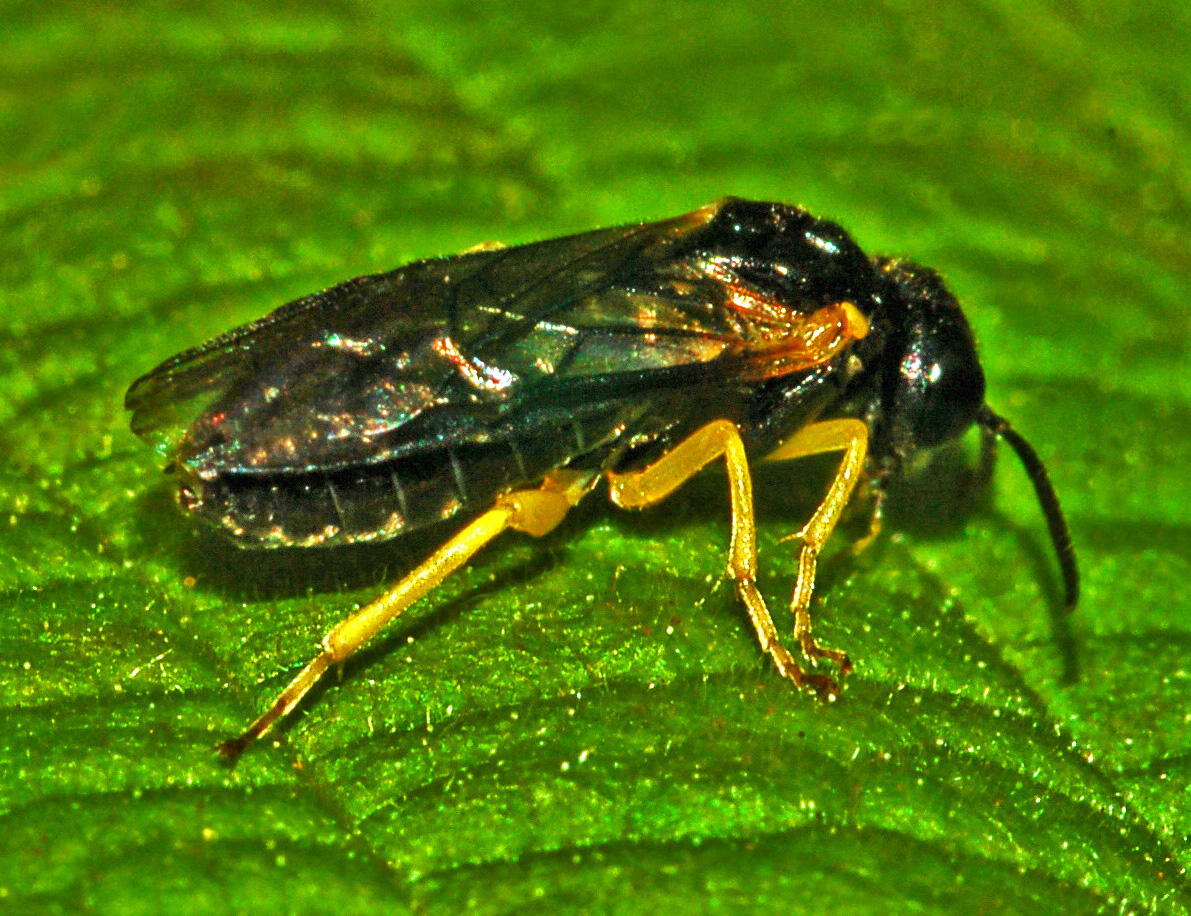

Scientific classification
- Kingdom: Animalia
- Phylum: Arthropoda
- Class: Insecta
- Order: Hymenoptera
- Suborder: Symphyta
- Family: Tenthredinidae
- Genus: Aneugmenus
- Species: A. padi

Binomial name
- Aneugmenus padi (Linnaeus, 1761)

Synonyms
- Tenthredo padi Linnaeus, 1761; Tenthredo stramineipes Klug, 1816

= Aneugmenus padi =

Species of sawfly

Aneugmenus padi is a species of sawfly (order Hymenoptera, family Tenthredinidae).

== Distribution and habitat ==
This species is present in most of Europe, North Africa, Asia Minor and Transcaucasia. It has been introduced in western North America, in the northern coastal areas. These sawflies mainly inhabit low-growing vegetation on spruce forest edge.

== Description ==
Aneugmenus padi can reach a length of 5–8 millimetres (0.20–0.31 in). Head, antennae, and abdomen are entirely black, while legs are yellow, with infuscate tarsi at their apices. Thorax is black, with white tegula. Wings are lightly infuscate.

== Biology ==
Adults can be found from May to September, while larvae are present from Spring to October. The main host plants of the oligophagous larvae of this species are bracken and other ferns (Pteridium aquilinum, Athyrium filix-femina and Dryopteris filix-mas).
