= Euura collactanea =

Scientific classification
- Domain: Eukaryota
- Kingdom: Animalia
- Phylum: Arthropoda
- Class: Insecta
- Order: Hymenoptera
- Suborder: Symphyta
- Family: Tenthredinidae
- Genus: Euura
- Species: E. collactanea

Binomial name
- Euura collactanea (Förster, 1854)

Synonyms
- List: Nematus collactaneus Förster, 1854; Pontania collactanea Konow (1901); Pontania (Pontania) collactanea Viitasaari & Vikberg (1985); Nematus (Pontania) collactanea Zhelochovtsev (1988); Eupontania collactanea Vikberg & Zinovjev (2006); Euura (Eupontania) collactanea Noblecourt (2016); Nematus deficiens Förster, 1854; Nematus crassipes var. vacciniellus Cameron 1876; Nematus xanthostylos Zaddach 1884; Pontania viminalis var. lugubris Enslin 1918; Pontania collactanea relicta Weiffenbach, 1962; Eupontania collactanea rosmarinifoliae Vikberg & Zinovjev, 2006; Nematus helicinus Thomson (1871)

Species of sawfly

Euura collactanea is a species of sawfly belonging to the family Tenthredinidae (common sawflies). The larva feed within galls on the leaves of willows (Salix species). It was first described by Arnold Förster in 1854.

== Description of the gall ==
The gall is found on the underside of a leaf of the host plant. It is globular and up to 5 mm in diameter. Descriptions vary according to the source. According to the Plant Parasites of Europe website, the gall can be hairy and sometimes warty. The colour varies from bright red to a red-tinged green. Redfern et al. (2011) describe the gall as having brown warts and either no hairs or slightly hairy. The galls can be found on the leaves of creeping willow (Salix repens) and rosemary-leaved willow (Salix rosmarinifolia).

== Distribution ==
The gall is found, in the west from Great Britain and Ireland (locally common), north to Sweden and east to Lake Ladoga, Russia.
