= Euura arcticornis =

Scientific classification
- Domain: Eukaryota
- Kingdom: Animalia
- Phylum: Arthropoda
- Class: Insecta
- Order: Hymenoptera
- Suborder: Symphyta
- Family: Tenthredinidae
- Genus: Euura
- Species: E. arcticornis

Binomial name
- Euura arcticornis (Konow, 1904)

Synonyms
- Pontania arcticornis Konow, 1904; Pontania (Eupontania) arcticornis Zinovjev (1985); Pontania (Pontania) arcticornis Viitasaari & Vikberg (1985); Nematus (Pontania) arcticornis Zhelochovtsev (1988); Eupontania arcticornis Vikberg & Zinovjev (2006); Euura arcticornis Prous et al. (2014); Pontania phylicifoliae Forsius, 1919; Pontania viminalis var. hepatimaculae Malaise, 1921

Species of sawfly

Euura arcticornis is a species of sawfly belonging to the family Tenthredinidae (common sawflies). The larva feed within galls on the leaves of willows (Salix species). It was first described by Friedrich Wilhelm Konow in 1904.

== Description of the gall ==
The yellowish-green gall is found on the underside of a leaf of the host plant. It is pear-shaped, sometimes has two or three lobes and is formed at an angle to the midrib. It can be smooth or hairy. The galls can be found on the leaves of tea-leaved willow (Salix phylicifolia) or its hybrids.

== Distribution ==
The gall is found in northern Europe, from Great Britain and Ireland (local in the north of England, Scotland and Ireland), throughout Fennoscandia and in northern Russia (Kanin Peninsula and Yakutia).
