= Euura testaceipes =

Scientific classification
- Domain: Eukaryota
- Kingdom: Animalia
- Phylum: Arthropoda
- Class: Insecta
- Order: Hymenoptera
- Suborder: Symphyta
- Family: Tenthredinidae
- Genus: Euura
- Species: E. testaceipes

Binomial name
- Euura testaceipes (Brischke, 1883)

Species of sawfly

Euura testaceipes is a species of sawfly belonging to the family Tenthredinidae (common sawflies). The larvae feed within the leaf-stalk (petiole), or midrib of a leaf, on willows (Salix species) forming a gall. The sawfly was first described by Carl Gustav Alexander Brischke in 1883. E. testaceipes is one of three closely related species known as the Euura amerinae species subgroup. The other members of the group are E. amerinae (Linnaeus, 1758) and E. venusta (Brischke, 1883)

== Description of the gall ==
The spindle-shaped or ovoid gall is formed in the petiole or midrib of a leaf and is 10 mm long and 5 mm wide and contains one larva. It can be found on white willow (S. alba), Babylon willow (S. babylonica), S. blanda, crack willow (S. fragilis) and almond willow (S. triandra). There can be several galls on a leaf.

== Distribution ==
The sawfly has been found in Great Britain, the Netherlands and Poland.
