= Euura oblita =

Scientific classification
- Domain: Eukaryota
- Kingdom: Animalia
- Phylum: Arthropoda
- Class: Insecta
- Order: Hymenoptera
- Suborder: Symphyta
- Family: Tenthredinidae
- Genus: Euura
- Species: E. oblita

Binomial name
- Euura oblita (Audinet-Serville, 1823)

Synonyms
- Nematus puella Thomson, 1871; Phyllocolpa oblitus (Serville, 1823); Pontania oblita Phyllocolpa puella (Thomson, 1871)

Species of sawfly

Euura oblita is a species of sawfly belonging to the family Tenthredinidae (common sawflies). The larvae feed on the leaves of willows (Salix species) and was first described by Jean Guillaume Audinet-Serville in 1823.

== Description of the gall ==
These are simple galls with the leaf rolled downwards affecting only one side of the leaf. The female forms the gall before she lays her eggs, with the caterpillar feeding inside the fold. It will also feed on ungalled parts of the leaf, or other leaves. In Great Britain the gall is found on white willow (Salix alba) and crack willow (S. fragilis). Elsewhere it has been found on weeping willow (S. babylonica) and almond willow (S. triandra).

Redfern et al. state that, in Great Britain, it is safe to identify the galls of this species and Euura destricta by the foodplants. E. destricta feeds on bay willow (S. pentandra). In Great Britain, other Euura species do not form galls on these host plants.

== Distribution ==
The sawfly has been found in Great Britain (England and Wales) and the Netherlands.
