= Sieve tube element =

Elongated cell in the phloem tissue of flowering plants

Sieve elements or sieve tube elements are specialized cells that are important for the function of phloem, which is a highly organized tissue that transports organic compounds made during photosynthesis. Sieve elements are the major conducting cells in phloem. Conducting cells aid in transport of molecules especially for long-distance signaling. In plant anatomy, there are two main types of sieve elements. Companion cells and sieve cells originate from meristems, which are tissues that actively divide throughout a plant's lifetime. They are similar to the development of xylem, a water conducting tissue in plants whose main function is also transportation in the plant vascular system. Sieve elements' major function includes transporting sugars over long distance through plants by acting as a channel.

Sieve elements elongate cells containing sieve areas on their walls. Pores on sieve areas allow for cytoplasmic connections to neighboring cells, which allows for the movement of photosynthetic material and other organic molecules necessary for tissue function. Structurally, they are elongated and parallel to the organ or tissue that they are located in. Sieve elements typically lack a nucleus and contain none to a very small number of ribosomes. The two types of sieve elements, sieve tube members and sieve cells, have different structures. Sieve tube members are shorter and wider with greater area for nutrient transport while sieve cells tend to be longer and narrower with smaller area for nutrient transport. Although the function of both of these kinds of sieve elements is the same, sieve cells are found in gymnosperms, non-flowering vascular plants, while sieve tube members are found in angiosperms, flowering vascular plants.

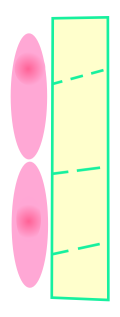
Companion cell (left, light pink), nucleus (dark pink), sieve tube (right, solid green), sieve tube plates (dashed green), dissolved nutrients (yellow)

== Discovery ==
Sieve elements were first discovered by the forest botanist Theodor Hartig in 1837. Since this discovery, the structure and physiology of phloem tissue has been emphasized more as there has been greater focus on its specialized components such as the sieve cells. Phloem was introduced by Carl Nägeli in 1858 after the discovery of sieve elements. Since then, multiple studies have been conducted on how sieve elements function in phloem in terms of working as a transport mechanism. An example of analysis of phloem through sieve elements was conducted in the study of Arabidopsis leaves. By studying the phloem of the leaves in vivo through laser microscopy and the usage of fluorescent markers (placed in both companion cells and sieve elements), the network of companion cells with the compact sieve tubes was highlighted. The markers for sieve elements and companion cells was used to study the network and organization of phloem cells.

== Sieve cells ==
Sieve cells are long, conducting cells in the phloem that do not form sieve tubes. The major difference between sieve cells and sieve tube members is the lack of sieve plates in sieve cells. They have a very narrow diameter and tend to be longer in length than sieve tube elements as they are generally associated with albuminous cells. Similar to how Sieve Tube members are associated with companion cells, sieve cells are flanked with albuminous cells in order to aid in transporting organic material. Albuminous cells have long, unspecialized areas with ends that overlap with those of other sieve cells and contain nutrients and store food in order to nourish tissues. They enable the sieve cells to be connected to parenchyma, functional tissue in the organs, which helps to stabilize the tissue and transport nutrients. Sieve cells are also associated with gymnosperms because they lack the companion cell and sieve member complexes that angiosperms have. Sieve cells are very uniform and have an even distribution across of sieve areas. Their narrow pores are necessary in their function in most seedless vascular plants and gymnosperms which lack sieve-tube members and only have sieve cells to transport molecules. While sieve cells have smaller sieve areas, they are still distributed across several cells to still effectively transport material to various tissue within the plant.

Sieve cell associated albuminous cells work between phloem and parenchyma. They connect parenchyma with mature sieve cells to help participate in transport of cells. There can be many of these albuminous cells that belong to one sieve cell, depending on the function of the tissue or organ.

Sieve pores are very common in the areas that have overlapping sieve cells. Callose levels are measure in order to observe the activity of sieve cells. Callose acts as a block to the sieve pores that are present in both of these sieve elements. A lack callose suggests that the sieve elements are more active and therefore can regulate their pores more actively in response to environmental changes.

== Further applications in agriculture ==
Because the plant vascular system is vital in growth and development of plant cells and the organs within the plant, the role of sieve elements in the transport of necessary carbohydrates and macromolecules is largely expanded. This can be applied to agriculture to observe the way resources are distributed to various parts of the plant. Plasmodesmata connect companion cells to sieve elements and parenchyma cells can connect the sieve tubes to various tissues within the plant. This system between the plasmodesmata, companion cells, and sieve tubes allow for the delivery of necessary metabolites. The yield of agricultural product could potentially be increased to maximize the delivery system of these specialized cells within the phloem in a way that diffusion can be maximized. It has been discovered that the angiosperm phloem can use the sieve tubes as a way to transport various forms of RNA to sink tissues which can help alter transcriptional activity. Sink tissues are tissues that are in the process of growth and need nutrients. Having Sieve elements transport additional nutrients to sink tissues can speed up the growth process, which can affect plant growth and development. Over time, rapid growth has the potential of leading to greater agricultural output.

== See also ==
- Vascular tissue
