= Euura vesicator =

Scientific classification
- Domain: Eukaryota
- Kingdom: Animalia
- Phylum: Arthropoda
- Class: Insecta
- Order: Hymenoptera
- Suborder: Symphyta
- Family: Tenthredinidae
- Genus: Euura
- Species: E. vesicator

Binomial name
- Euura vesicator (Bremi-Wolf, 1849)

Species of sawfly

Euura vesicator is a species of sawfly belonging to the family Tenthredinidae (common sawflies). The larvae feed internally in a gall on the leaves of purple willow (Salix purpurea) and its hybrids. It was first described by Johann Jacob Bremi-Wolf in 1849.

== Description of the gall ==
The gall is ovoid and bladder like, 11 mm long and 5 mm across, and may broaden the leaf. A single white larva lives within the gall which is only found on purple willow (S. purpurea) and its hybrids.

Euura vesicator is one of two closely related species in the Euura vesicator subgroup; the other being E. pustulator.

== Distribution ==
The sawfly has been recorded from Great Britain (England, Scotland and Wales), the Netherlands and Switzerland.

== Inquilines and predators ==
- Archarius crux (Fabricius, 1776) – the adult weevil overwinter and lays one to eight eggs in the gall. The larvae eat the egg or larva of E. vesicator as well as the gall tissue. Pupation take place in the ground and there are two generations in a year.
- A. salicivorus (Paykull, 1792) – the adult weevil overwinter and lays an egg in the gall, eventually killing the E. vesicator larva, but not eating it. The larva lies in a horse-shoe position and does not have legs. Pupation is in the ground and there are two generations in a year.
- Eurytoma aciculata Ratzeburg, 1848 – the eurytomid wasp kills the larva and feeds on the gall tissue.
- Gypsonoma dealbana (Fröhlich, 1828) – the moth larvae are polyphagous usually feeding on buds, catkins and leaves. They have been found in galls leading to the death of the gall causer.
