= Euura crassipes =

Scientific classification
- Domain: Eukaryota
- Kingdom: Animalia
- Phylum: Arthropoda
- Class: Insecta
- Order: Hymenoptera
- Suborder: Symphyta
- Family: Tenthredinidae
- Genus: Euura
- Species: E. crassipes

Binomial name
- Euura crassipes (Thomson, 1871) comb. nov.

Species of sawfly

Euura crassipes is a species of sawfly belonging to the family Tenthredinidae (common sawflies) and was first described by Carl Gustaf Thomson in 1871. The larvae feed internally in a gall formed on the leaves of downy willow (Salix lapponum).

== Description of the gall ==
Descriptions of the gall differs depending on the source. According to Redfern et al. (2011) the thin-walled gall is globular, 4–10 mm diameter and usually protruding more on the underside of the leaf of downy willow. According to the website Plant Parasites of Europe, the thin-walled gall protrudes equally on either side of the leaf. The gall feels like felt, is hairy and large in relation to the size of the leaf.

== Distribution ==
This species has only been recorded from Finland, Russia (Kola Peninsula), Scotland and Sweden.
