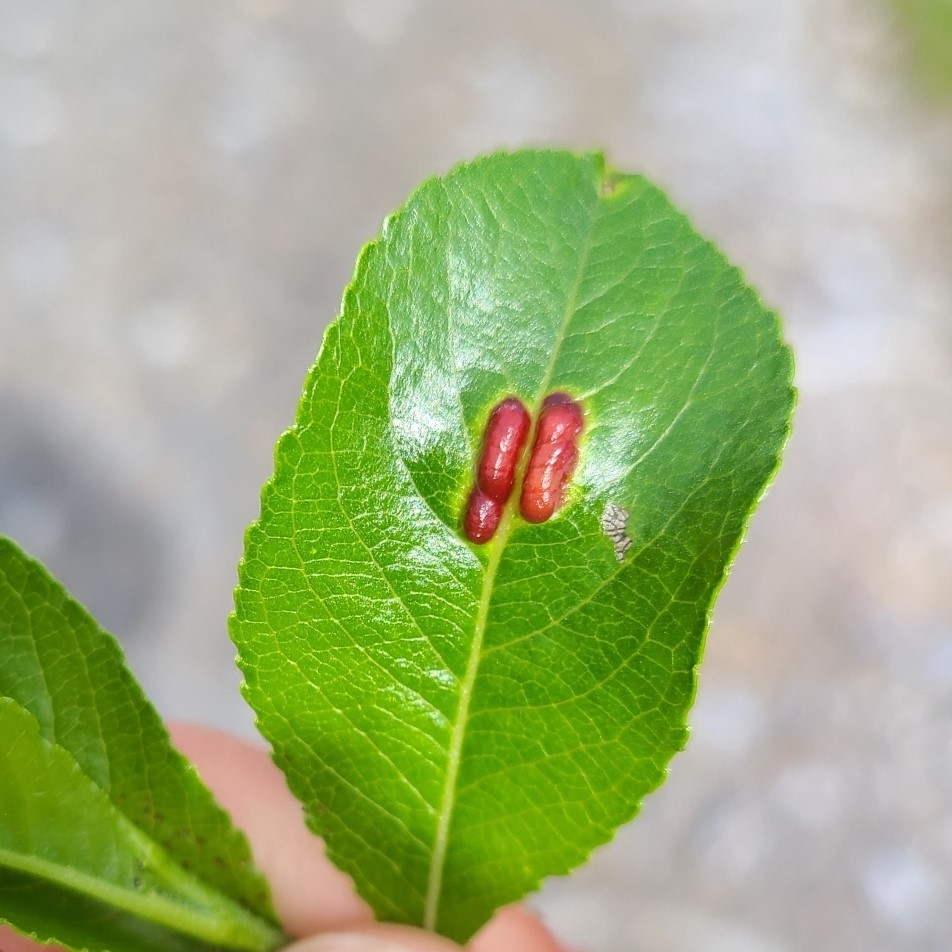

Scientific classification
- Kingdom: Animalia
- Phylum: Arthropoda
- Class: Insecta
- Order: Hymenoptera
- Suborder: Symphyta
- Family: Tenthredinidae
- Genus: Euura
- Species: E. nigricantis

Binomial name
- Euura nigricantis (Kopelke, 1986)

Synonyms
- Pontania nigricantis Kopelke,1986

= Euura nigricantis =

Species of sawfly

Euura nigricantis is a species of sawfly belonging to the family Tenthredinidae (common sawflies). The larvae feed within galls on the leaves of dark-leaved willow (Salix myrsinifolia). It was described by Jens-Peter Kopelke in 1986.

== Description of the gall ==
The dark-red sausage shaped gall (10 mm x 2 mm), is usually in pairs, either side of the midrib and on the upper side of the leaf. On the lower side of the leaf, it is flush with the surface. Inside the gall is a single caterpillar, along with frass. The galls are formed on the leaves of dark-leaved willow (S. myrsinifolia).

Euura nigricantis is one of seven closely related species in the Euura dolichura species group.

== Distribution ==
This species has been recorded from Austria, Finland, Great Britain (Scotland), and Sweden.
