= Euura destricta =

Scientific classification
- Domain: Eukaryota
- Kingdom: Animalia
- Phylum: Arthropoda
- Class: Insecta
- Order: Hymenoptera
- Suborder: Symphyta
- Family: Tenthredinidae
- Genus: Euura
- Species: E. destricta

Binomial name
- Euura destricta (MacGillivray, 1923)

Synonyms
- Phyllocolpa carinifrons (Benson, 1940); Phyllocolpa plicaglauca Kopelke, 2007; Pontania excavata auctorum

Species of sawfly

Euura destricta is a species of sawfly belonging to the family Tenthredinidae (common sawflies). The larvae feed on the leaves of willow (Salix species).

== Description of the gall ==
These are simple galls with the leaf rolled, or folded downwards affecting one or both sides of the leaf. The female forms the gall before she lays her eggs, with the caterpillar feeding inside the fold. It will also feed on ungalled parts of the leaf, or other leaves. The gall is usually found on bay willow (S. pentandra), and can also be found on gray willow (S. glauca) and tea-leaved willow (S. phylicifolia).

Redfern et al. state that, in Great Britain, it is safe to identify the galls of this species and Euura oblita by the foodplants. E. oblita feeds on crack willow (S. fragilis) and white willow (S. alba). In Great Britain, other Euura species do not form galls on these host plants.

== Distribution ==
The sawfly has been found in Finland, Great Britain (England and Scotland), Ireland and Sweden.
