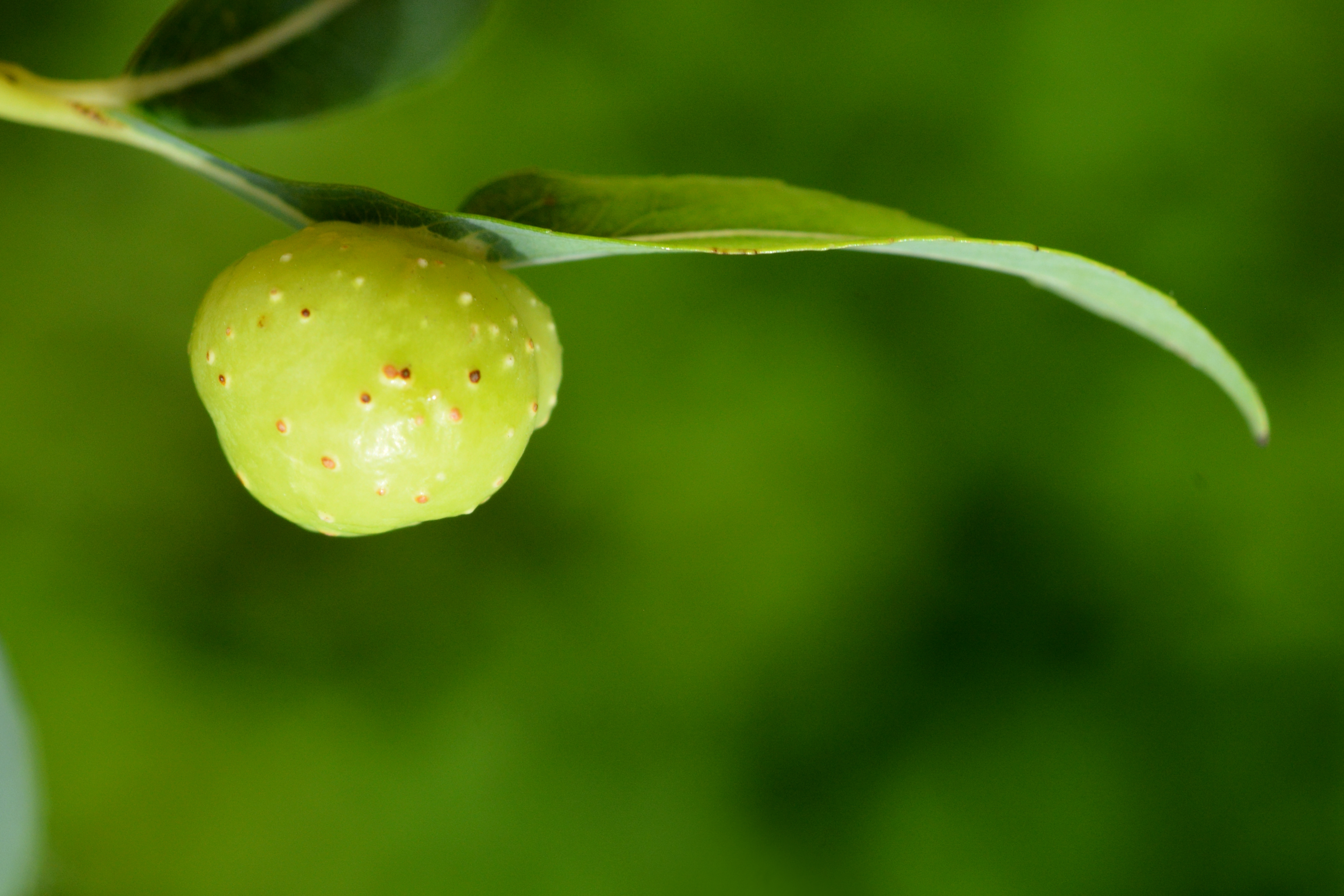
- Euura viminalis on Salix purpurea

Scientific classification
- Kingdom: Animalia
- Phylum: Arthropoda
- Class: Insecta
- Order: Hymenoptera
- Suborder: Symphyta
- Family: Tenthredinidae
- Genus: Euura
- Species: E. viminalis

Binomial name
- Euura viminalis (Linnaeus, 1758)

Synonyms
- List: Cynips viminalis Linnaeus, 1758; Pontania viminalis Benson (1958); Pontania (Eupontania) viminalis Zinovjev (1985); Pontania (Pontania) viminalis Viitasaari & Vikberg (1985); Nematus (Pontania) viminalis Zhelochovtsev (1988); Eupontania viminalis Vikberg (2003); Euura viminalis Beneš (2015); Nematus vollenhoveni Cameron, 1874; Nematus interstitialis Cameron, 1876; Pontania viminalis var. xanthaspis Enslin, 1915; Pontania hungarica Enslin, 1918

= Euura viminalis =

Species of sawfly

Euura viminalis is a species of sawfly belonging to the family Tenthredinidae (common sawflies). The larva feed within galls on the leaves of willows (Salix species). It was first described by Carl Linnaeus in his landmark 1758 10th edition of Systema Naturae.

== Description of the gall ==
The gall is found on the underside of a leaf of the host plant. It is egg shaped when young, becomes globular as it matures, has brown warts and is usually hairless. It can have a diameter of up to 5 mm and can have a red tinge. On the upperside of the leaf there is a brownish circular depression. The galls can be found on the leaves of osier (Salix viminalis) and purple willow (Salix purpurea).

== Distribution ==
This species is found in most of south and central Europe north to southern Sweden. It is common in Great Britain and Ireland.

== Inquilines and predators ==
Three weevils have been found living in the galls, Melanapion minimum, Archarius crux and A. salicivorus. The larva of the eurytomid wasp, Eurytoma aciculata lives in the gall and kills the sawfly larvae. The tortricid moth, Gypsonoma dealbana usually feeds on various parts of willow but have been found inside the gall, killing the larvae.
