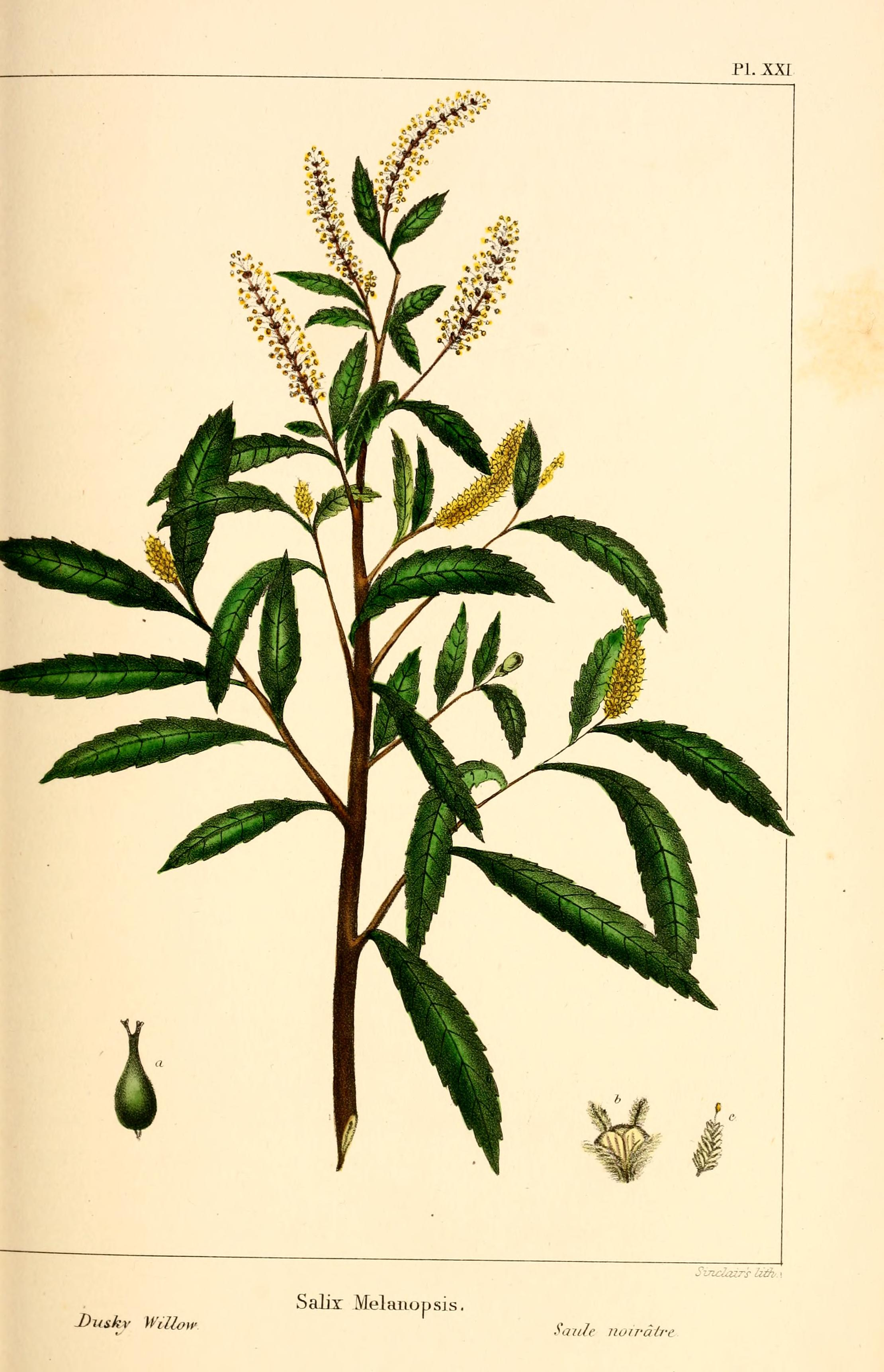

Conservation status
- Least Concern (IUCN 3.1)

Scientific classification
- Kingdom: Plantae
- Clade: Tracheophytes
- Clade: Angiosperms
- Clade: Eudicots
- Clade: Rosids
- Order: Malpighiales
- Family: Salicaceae
- Genus: Salix
- Species: S. melanopsis

Binomial name
- Salix melanopsis Nutt.

Synonyms
- Salix bolanderiana Rowlee; Salix exigua subsp. melanopsis (Nutt.) Cronquist; Salix exigua var. gracilipes (C.R. Ball) Cronquist; Salix exigua var. melanopsis (Nutt.) Cronquist; Salix exigua var. tenerrima (L.F. Hend.) C.K. Schneid.; Salix fluviatilis Nutt.; Salix fluviatilis var. tenerrima (L.F. Hend.) Howell; Salix longifolia var. tenerrima L.F. Hend.; Salix melanopsis var. bolanderiana (Rowlee) C.K. Schneid.; Salix melanopsis var. gracilipes C.R. Ball; Salix melanopsis var. kronkheitii Kelso; Salix melanopsis var. tenerrima (L.F. Hend.) C.R. Ball; Salix parksiana C.R. Ball; Salix sessilifolia var. vancouverensis Brayshaw; Salix tenerrima (L.F. Hend.) A. Heller

= Salix melanopsis =

Species of flowering plant

Salix melanopsis is a plant species known by the common name dusky willow. It is native to western North America from British Columbia and Alberta to California and Colorado, where it grows in many types of moist and wet habitat, such as riverbanks and subalpine mountain meadows, on rocky and silty substrates.

== Description ==
Salix melanopsis is a shrub up to 4 meters tall, sometimes sprouting abundantly from its stem to form colonial thickets of clones. The pointed, oval, lance-shaped, or linear leaves may grow over 13 centimeters long and have smooth or spine-toothed edges. The inflorescence is a catkin of flowers up to 5 or 6 centimeters long.
