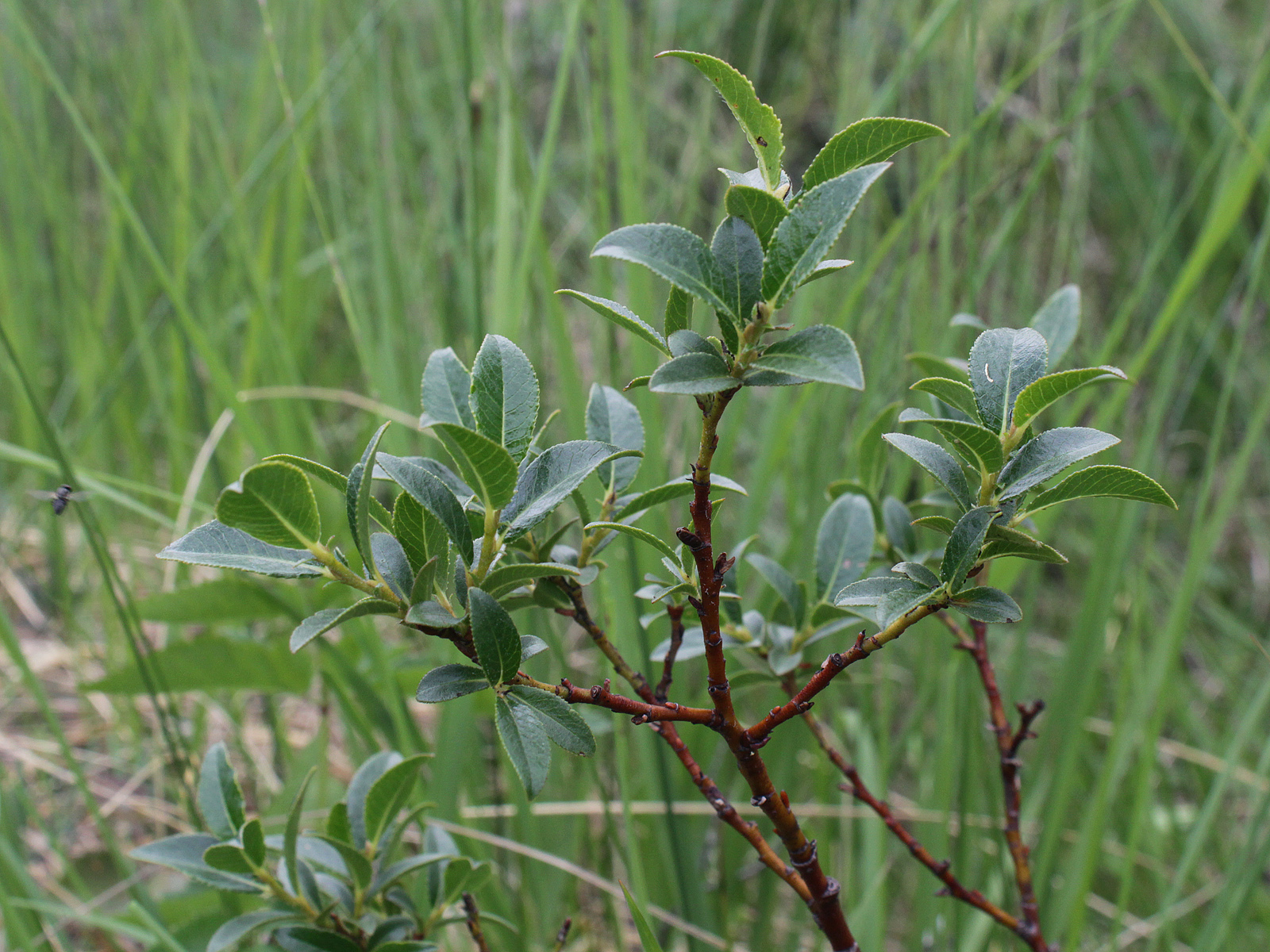

Scientific classification
- Kingdom: Plantae
- Clade: Tracheophytes
- Clade: Angiosperms
- Clade: Eudicots
- Clade: Rosids
- Order: Malpighiales
- Family: Salicaceae
- Genus: Salix
- Species: S. myrsinites

Binomial name
- Salix myrsinites L.

= Salix myrsinites =

Species of flowering plant

Salix myrsinites is a species of flowering plant belonging to the family Salicaceae.

Its native range is Northern and Northeastern Europe.
