= Euura arbusculae =

Scientific classification
- Kingdom: Animalia
- Phylum: Arthropoda
- Clade: Pancrustacea
- Class: Insecta
- Order: Hymenoptera
- Suborder: Symphyta
- Family: Tenthredinidae
- Genus: Euura
- Species: E. arbusculae

Binomial name
- Euura arbusculae (Benson, 1941)

Synonyms
- Pontania arbusculae Benson, 1941; Nematus (Pontania) arbusculae Zhelochovtsev (1988); Eupontania arbusculae Vikberg (2003)

Species of sawfly

Euura arbusculae is a species of sawfly belonging to the family Tenthredinidae (common sawflies). The larvae feed internally in a gall formed on the leaves of mountain willow (Salix arbuscula).

== Description of the gall ==
Descriptions of the gall differs depending on the source. According to Redfern et al (2011) the thin-walled gall is globular, 4–10 mm diameter and usually protruding more on the underside of the leaf. According to the website Plant Parasites of Europe, the thin-walled gall protrudes equally on either side of the leaf. The gall is large in relation to the size of the leaf.

== Distribution ==
This species has only been recorded from Scotland. It may occur in Sweden where similar looking galls (without larvae) have been found and on Kolguyev Island, where galls have also been found.
