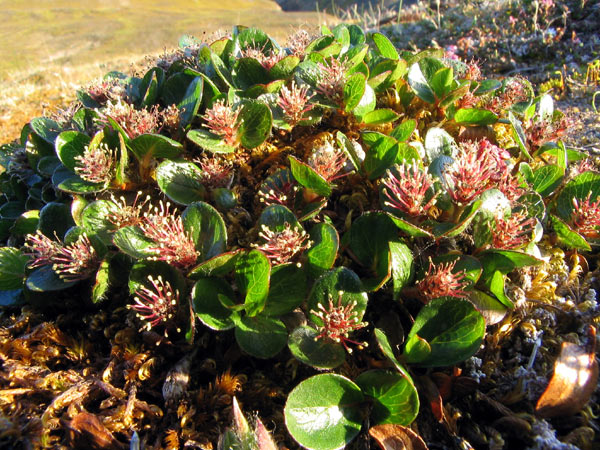

Scientific classification
- Kingdom: Plantae
- Clade: Tracheophytes
- Clade: Angiosperms
- Clade: Eudicots
- Clade: Rosids
- Order: Malpighiales
- Family: Salicaceae
- Genus: Salix
- Species: S. polaris

Binomial name
- Salix polaris Wahlenb.

= Salix polaris =

Species of willow

Salix polaris, the polar willow, is a species of willow with a circumpolar distribution in the high arctic tundra, extending north to the limits of land, and south of the Arctic in the mountains of Norway, the northern Ural Mountains, the northern Altay Mountains, Kamchatka, and British Columbia, Canada.

== Description ==
One of the smallest willows in the world, it is a prostrate, creeping dwarf shrub, only 2–9 cm (0.79–3.54 in) high, and has underground branches or runners in the uppermost soil layers. The leaves are rounded-ovate, 5–32 mm long and 8–18 mm broad, dark green with entire margins. It is dioecious, with separate female and male plants. The flowers are grouped in short catkins each bearing only a few flowers. The fruit is a brownish and hairy capsule. The long runners with freely rooting stems creep in mats of mosses and lichens, which keeps them together and protects them from the wind. It grows as well in open gravel as in closed vegetation.

Fossil remains of the species from the Pleistocene ice ages are known in Europe south to southern England, the Alps, and the Carpathians.

The species has also been reported from Arizona, but this is not accepted by the USDA.
