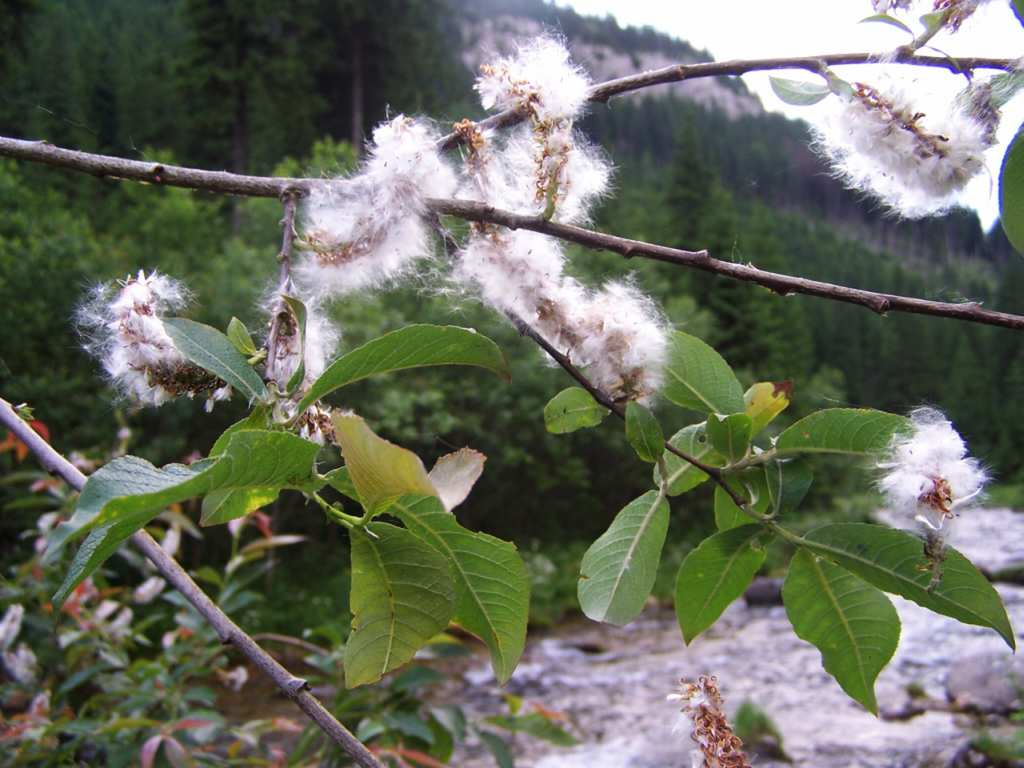
- Seeding beside a stream
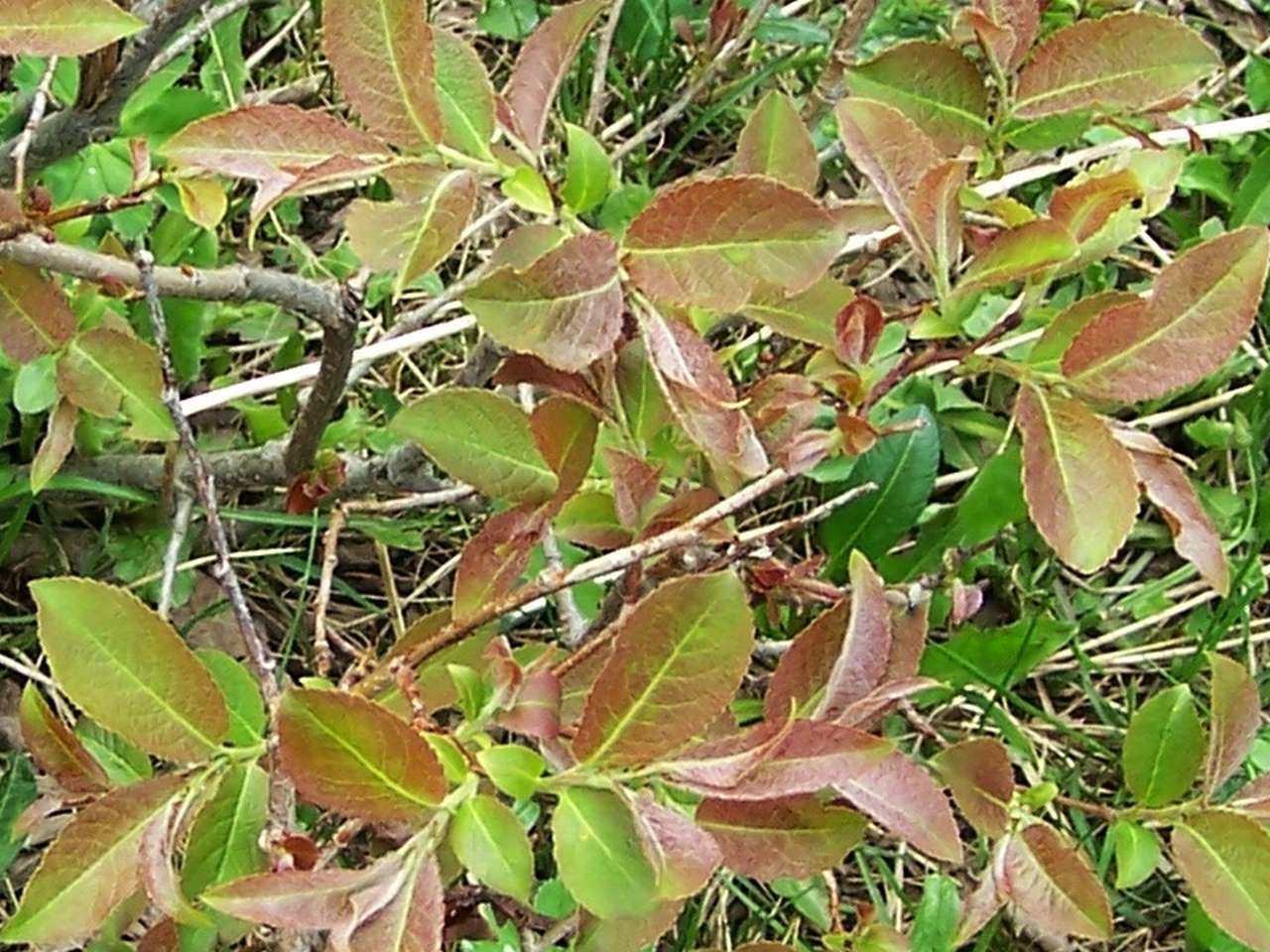
- Foliage

Conservation status
- Least Concern (IUCN 3.1)

Scientific classification
- Kingdom: Plantae
- Clade: Embryophytes
- Clade: Tracheophytes
- Clade: Spermatophytes
- Clade: Angiosperms
- Clade: Eudicots
- Clade: Rosids
- Order: Malpighiales
- Family: Salicaceae
- Genus: Salix
- Species: S. silesiaca

Binomial name
- Salix silesiaca Willd.

Synonyms
- List: Salix fagifolia Willd.; Salix lasiocarpa Wimm. ex Andersson; Salix ludwigii Schkuhr; Salix mauckschii Hartig; Salix parcipila Rehmann ex A.Camus & E.G.Camus; Salix rubens J.Presl & C.Presl; Salix silesiaca var. lasiocarpa Wimm.; Salix silesiaca f. trichocarpa Raclaru; Salix subaurita Andersson; Salix subcaprea Andersson; Salix subcinerea Andersson; Vimen silesiaca (Willd.) Raf.

= Salix silesiaca =

Species of flowering plant

Salix silesiaca, the Silesian willow, is a species of flowering plant in the family Salicaceae. It is native to the Sudeten and Carpathian Mountains, and the mountains of the Balkan Peninsula. A shrub reaching 6 ft (2 m), it is considered to be a member of the informal sallow group.
