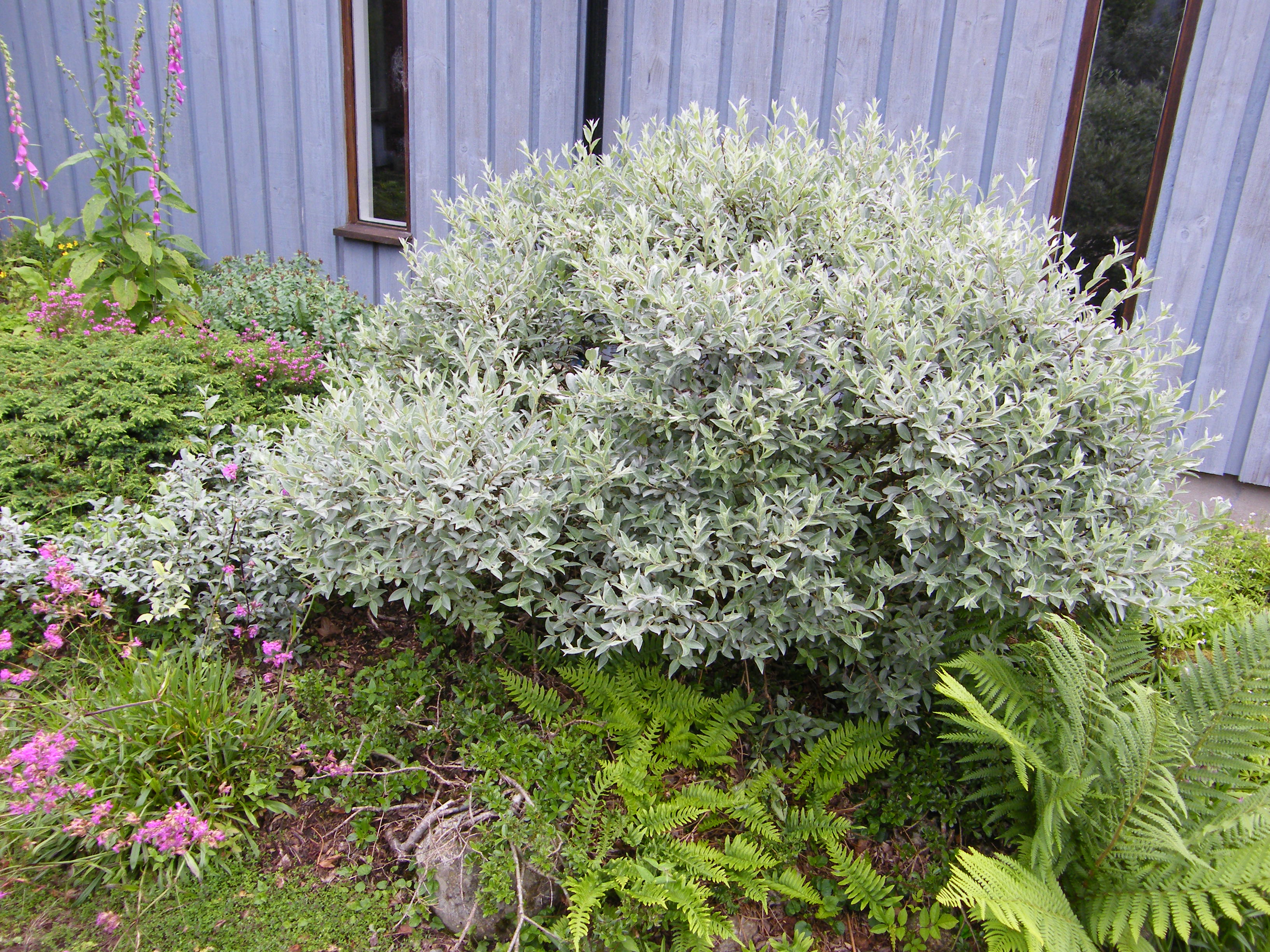

Scientific classification
- Kingdom: Plantae
- Clade: Tracheophytes
- Clade: Angiosperms
- Clade: Eudicots
- Clade: Rosids
- Order: Malpighiales
- Family: Salicaceae
- Genus: Salix
- Species: S. lapponum

Binomial name
- Salix lapponum L.

= Salix lapponum =

Species of shrub

Salix lapponum, the downy willow, is a low, much-branched shrub having a wide distribution in Northern Europe, eastwards to the Altai and western Siberia, and is found as far south as the Pyrenees and Bulgaria. In Scotland, UK, it can be found on rocky mountain slopes and cliffs, generally at altitudes of 200–900 m (660–2,950 ft). It grows to a height of 1.5 m (4.9 ft).

As described in Stace and BSBI Salix lapponum has the following characteristics:

- Twigs hairy at first, hairless and rather glossy dark reddish brown later.
- Leaves usually lanceolate to 7 cm long by 2.5 cm wide; slightly hairy to hairy on upper side; usually densely hairy on lower side; margins entire or subentire, sometimes a little undulate.
- Petiole short, occasionally up to 1 cm long but usually less than 5mm.
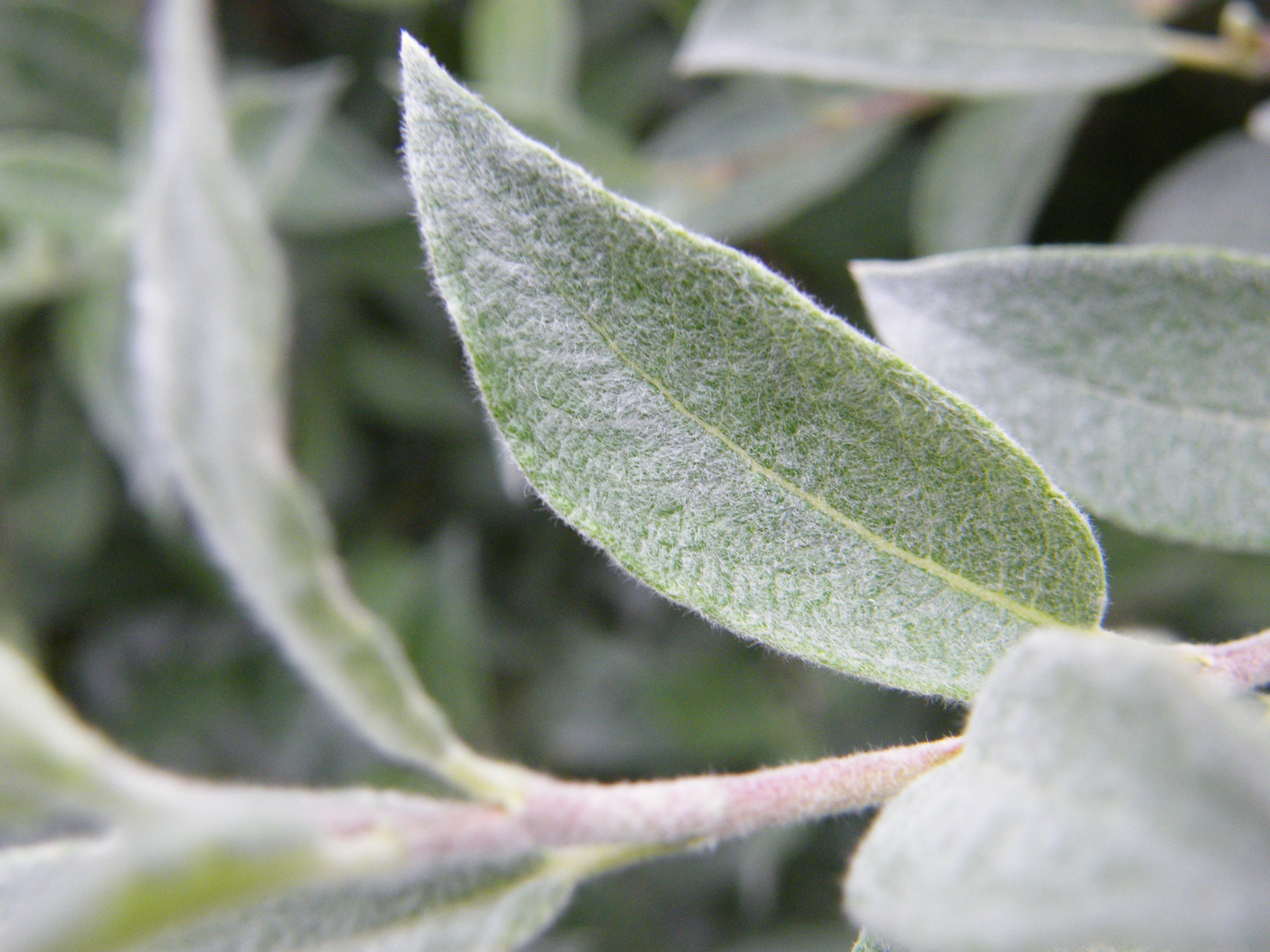
Upper surface of leaf

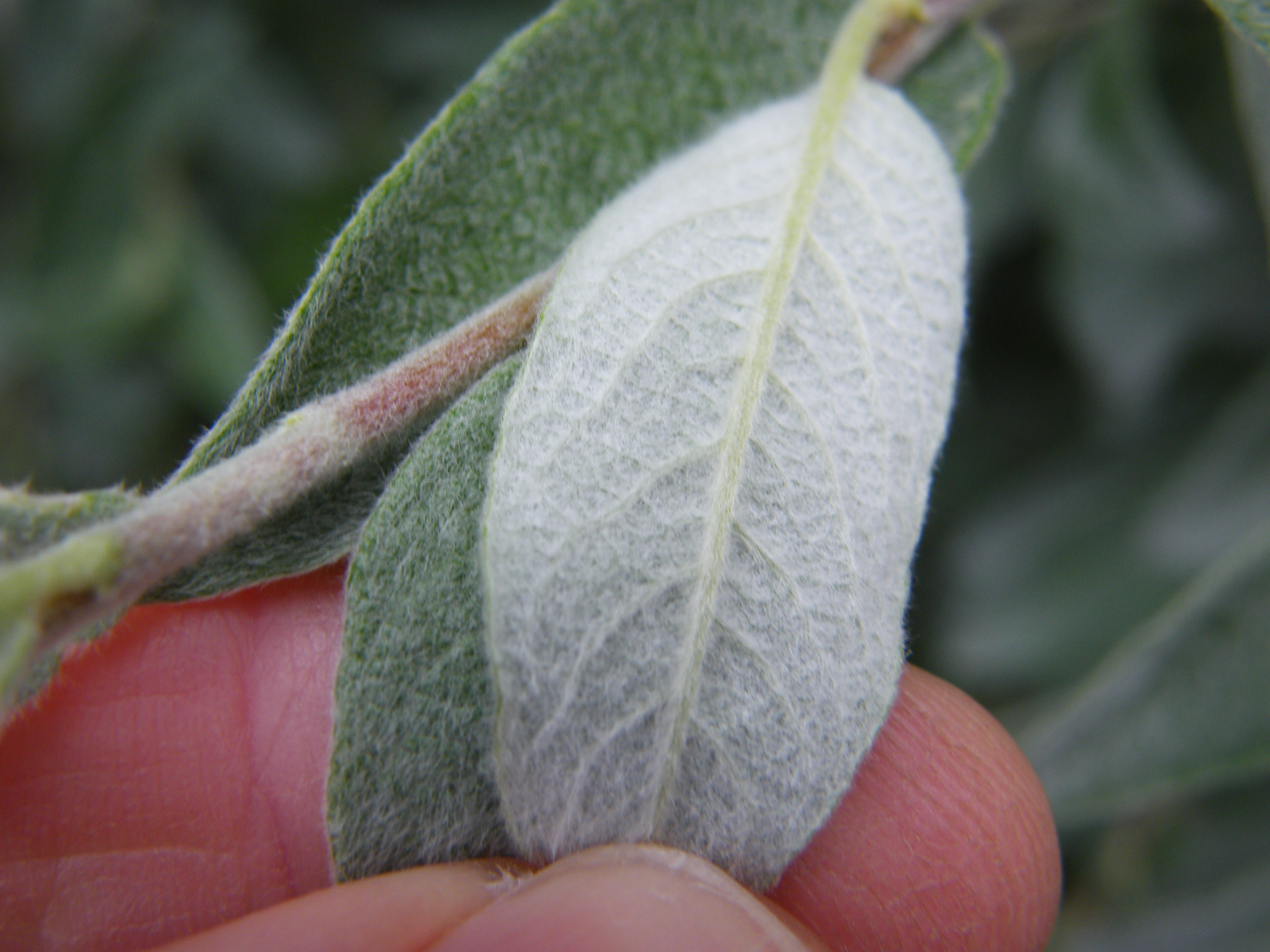
Lower surface of leaf

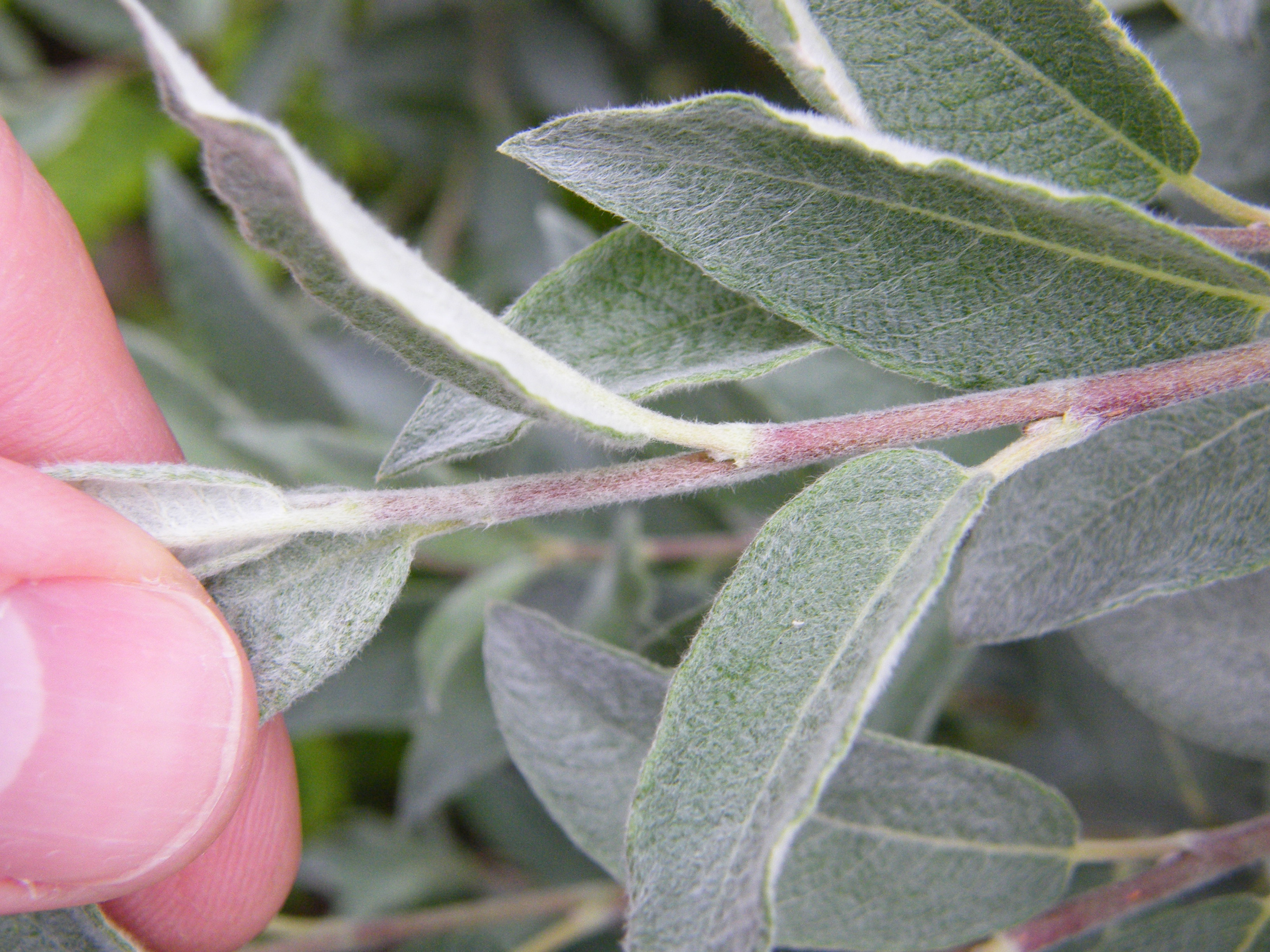
View showing twig and leaf petioles
