= Theodor Hartig =

German forestry biologist (1805–1880)

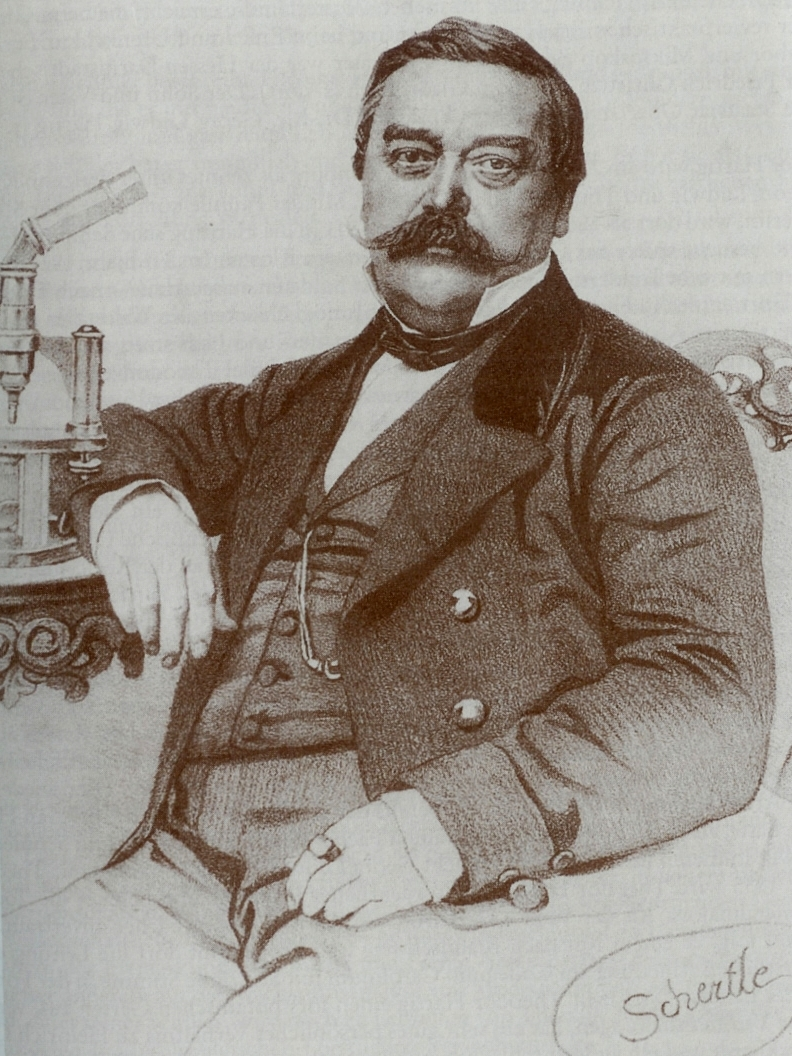
- Theodor Hartig, from the book Biographien bedeutender hessischer Forstleute, Wiesbaden und Frankfurt am Main 1990, p. 271
- Born: 21 February 1805; Dillenburg
- Died: 26 March 1880 (aged 75); Braunschweig
- Known for: Sieve tube elements, Hartig net
- Scientific career
- Fields: Forestry science, botany, zoology
- Author abbrev. (botany): Hartig
- Author abbrev. (zoology): Hartig

Theodor Hartig (21 February 1805 – 26 March 1880) was a German forestry biologist and botanist.

== Biography ==
Hartig was born in Dillenburg. He was educated in Berlin (1824–1827), and was successively lecturer and professor of forestry at the University of Berlin (1831–1838) and at the Carolinum, Braunschweig.

Hartig was the first to discover and name the sieve tube element cells (as Siebfasern - sieve fibres and Siebröhren - sieve tubes) in 1837. His zoologist author abbreviation is Hartig. He described many gall wasp species.

In 1842, Theodor Hartig described what is now known as the Hartig net, a network of fungal hyphae that penetrate feeder roots and surround epidermal cells. The Hartig net is part of the structure of ectomycorrizae, mutualistic symbioses between fungi and plant roots.

He died in Braunschweig.

== Works ==
- 1836. Forstliches und forstnaturwissenschaftliches Conversations-Lexicon. Georg Ludwig Hartig and Theodor Hartig
- 1840. Über die Familie der Gallwespen. Zeitschrift für die Entomologie, ed. von E.F. Germar, 2: 176–209
- 1841. Erster Nachtrag zur Naturgeschichte der Gallwespen. Zeitschrift für die Entomologie, ed. von E.F. Germar, 3: 322–358
- 1843. Zweiter Nachtrag zur Naturgeschichte der Gallwespen. Zeitschrift für die Entomologie, ed. von E.F. Germar, 4: 395–422
- 1851. Vergleichende Untersuchungen über den Ertrag der Rotbuche (2nd ed.)
- 1860. Die Aderflügler Deutschlands (2nd ed.)
- 1866. Forstwissenschaftliches Examinatorium den Waldbau betreffend
- 1877 Luft-, Boden- und Pflanzenkunde in ihrer Anwendung auf Forstwirtschaft und Gartenbau, bearbeitet von Theodor Hartig für alle Freunde und Pfleger der wissenschaftlicher Botanik
- 1878. Anatomie und physiologie der holzpflanzen. Dargestellt in der entstehungsweise und im entwickelungsverlaufe der einzelzelle, der zellsysteme, der pflanzenglieder und der gesammtpflanze

In collaboration with his father, Georg Ludwig Hartig, he published the work entitled, Forstliches und naturwissenschaftliches Konversationslexikon. The eleventh edition of his father's Lehrbuch für Förster, the later reprints of which he had revised, was published in 1877.

== Family ==
He was the son of Georg Ludwig Hartig (1764–1837), a German forester. His son Robert (1839–1901) was a forest scientist and mycologist who is considered the "father of forest pathology".
