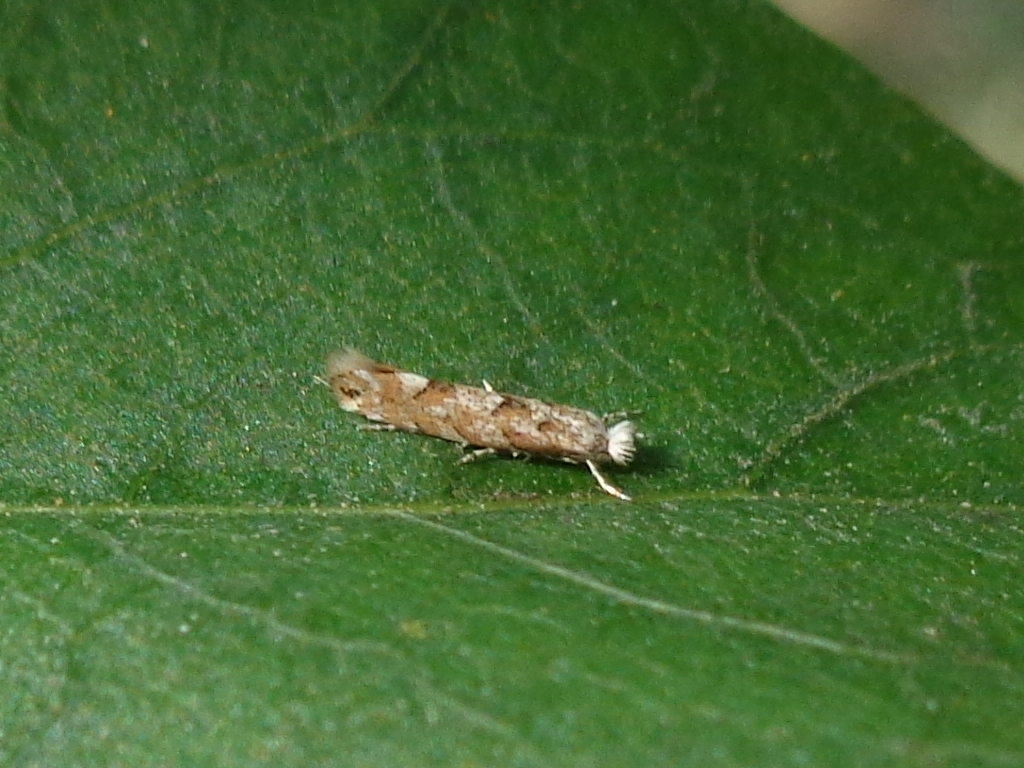

Scientific classification
- Domain: Eukaryota
- Kingdom: Animalia
- Phylum: Arthropoda
- Class: Insecta
- Order: Lepidoptera
- Family: Gracillariidae
- Genus: Phyllonorycter
- Species: P. pastorella

Binomial name
- Phyllonorycter pastorella (Zeller, 1846)

Synonyms
- Lithocolletis pastorella Zeller, 1846

= Phyllonorycter pastorella =

Species of moth

Phyllonorycter pastorella is a moth of the family Gracillariidae. It is known from all of Europe (except the British Isles, Greece, Portugal, Denmark, Norway, Luxembourg and the Mediterranean islands), east to Russia, China and Japan.

The wingspan is 8-9.5 mm.

The larvae feed on Populus alba, P. nigra, Salix alba, S. babylonica, Salix × fragilis, S. lanata, S. pentandra, S. purpurea, Salix × sepulcralis, S. triandra and S. viminalis. They mine the leaves of their host plant.
