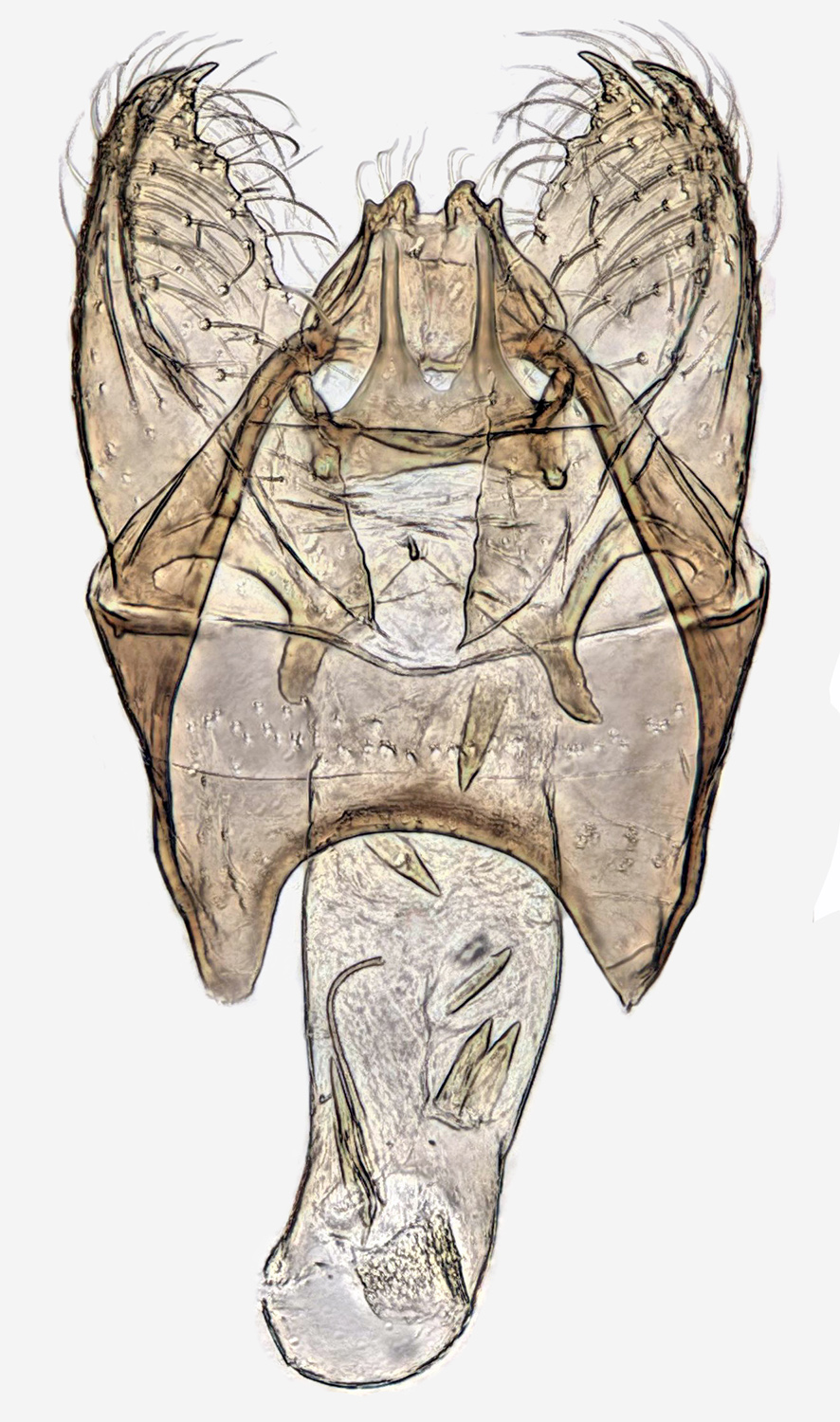

Scientific classification
- Kingdom: Animalia
- Phylum: Arthropoda
- Class: Insecta
- Order: Lepidoptera
- Family: Nepticulidae
- Genus: Stigmella
- Species: S. salicis

Binomial name
- Stigmella salicis (Stainton, 1854)

Synonyms
- Nepticula salicis Stainton, 1854; Nepticula arbusculae Klimesch, 1951; Nepticula auritella Skala, 1939; Nepticula dewitziella Sorhagen, 1885; Nepticula libiezi Dufrane, 1949; Nepticula salicella Herrich-Schaffer, 1855; Nepticula salicivorella Doubleday, 1859; Nepticula uniformis Heinemann, 1871

= Stigmella salicis =

Species of moth

Stigmella salicis is a moth of the family Nepticulidae which is found in Europe. It was first described by the English entomologist, Henry Stainton in 1854. The type locality is from England.

== Description ==
The wingspan is 4–6 millimetres (0.16–0.24 in)The thick erect hairs on the head vertex are ferruginous-orange. The collar is paler. The antennal eyecaps are whitish. The front wings are fuscous or dark fuscous, faintly purplish-tinged, somewhat sprinkled with pale yellowish with an ochreous-whitish rather oblique fascia beyond middle. The apical area beyond this sometimes more blackish; outer half of cilia ochreous-white. Hindwings grey. Microscopic examination of the genitalia is essential for correct determination.

The moth is bivoltine (i.e. has two generations a year). In Great Britain adults are on wing from April to May and again from July to August. The flight period may be different in other parts of its range. The type locality is from England.

== Life cycle ==
=== Egg ===
Eggs are laid on the underside of a rough-leaved willow leaf, usually concealed in the down close to a rib and can be found in May and August to September.

=== Larva ===
Larva, feed internally within a leaf and are amber-yellow with a pale brown head. They can be found in June and July and again from September to November.

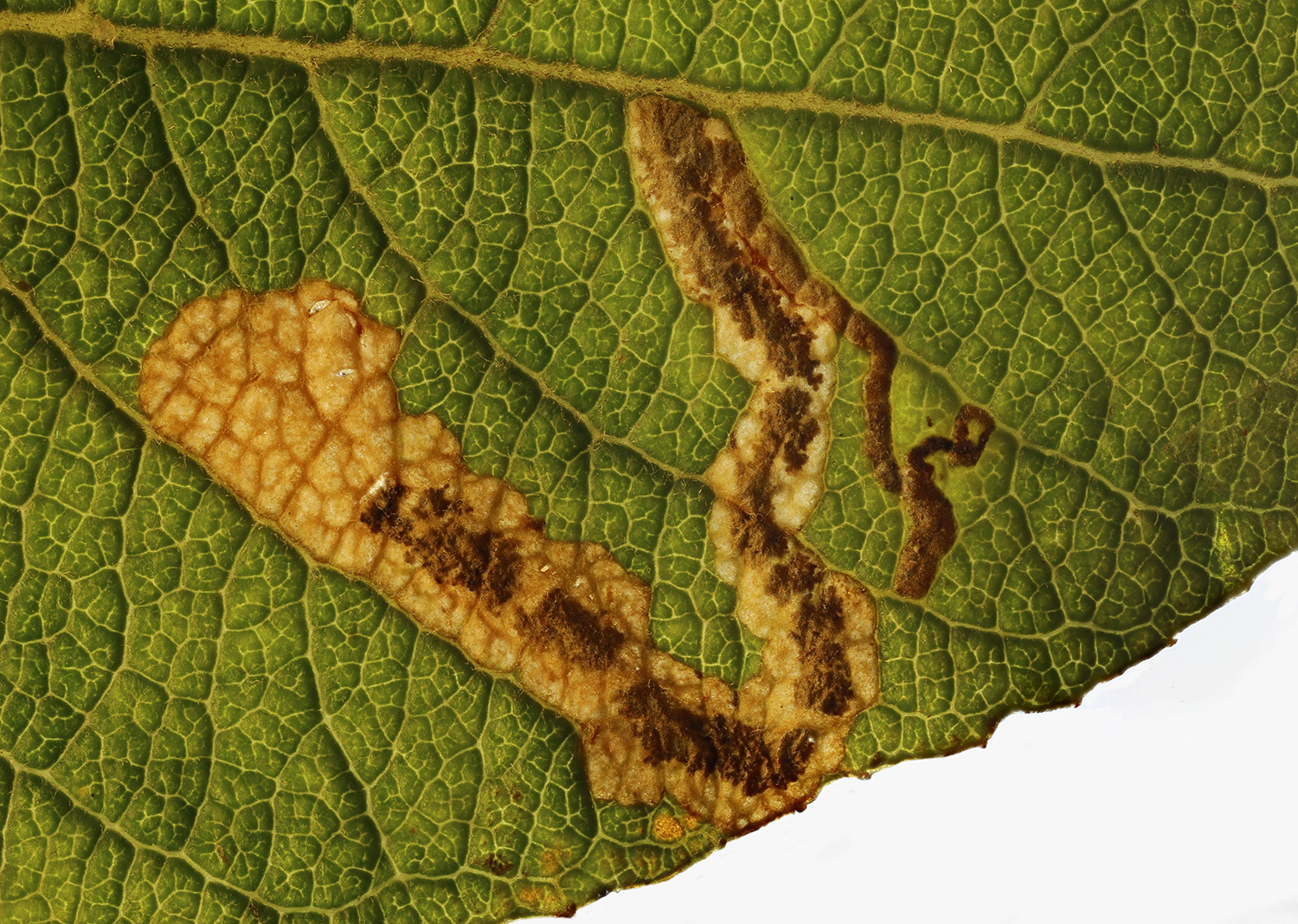
Mine showing the frass

They mine the leaves of their host plant, in a gallery which can be variable and highly contorted. The mine starts comparatively wide and is initially almost filled with frass. Later there are clear margins and the frass becomes broken. The mine can follow a leaf margin, a rib or can be highly contorted. It later widens to form a blotch, or if highly contorted with 'S' bends, a false blotch. The larvae feed on Myrica gale (Note: Occasionally occurs on Myrica (Myricaceae).), Salix alba, Salix atrocinerea, Salix aurita, Salix babylonica, Salix caprea, Salix cinerea, Salix daphnoides, Salix fragilis, Salix lanata, Salix pentandra, Salix purpurea, Salix repens, Salix silesiaca, Salix triandra and Salix viminalis. Mines on the narrow-leaved willows can be difficult to distinguish from those of S. obliquella.

=== Pupa ===
The pupa is in a yellowish-brown cocoon spun in detritus and can be found in July and August, and from November through to April.

== Distribution ==
S. salicis is found in Europe (except Iceland and Greece).
