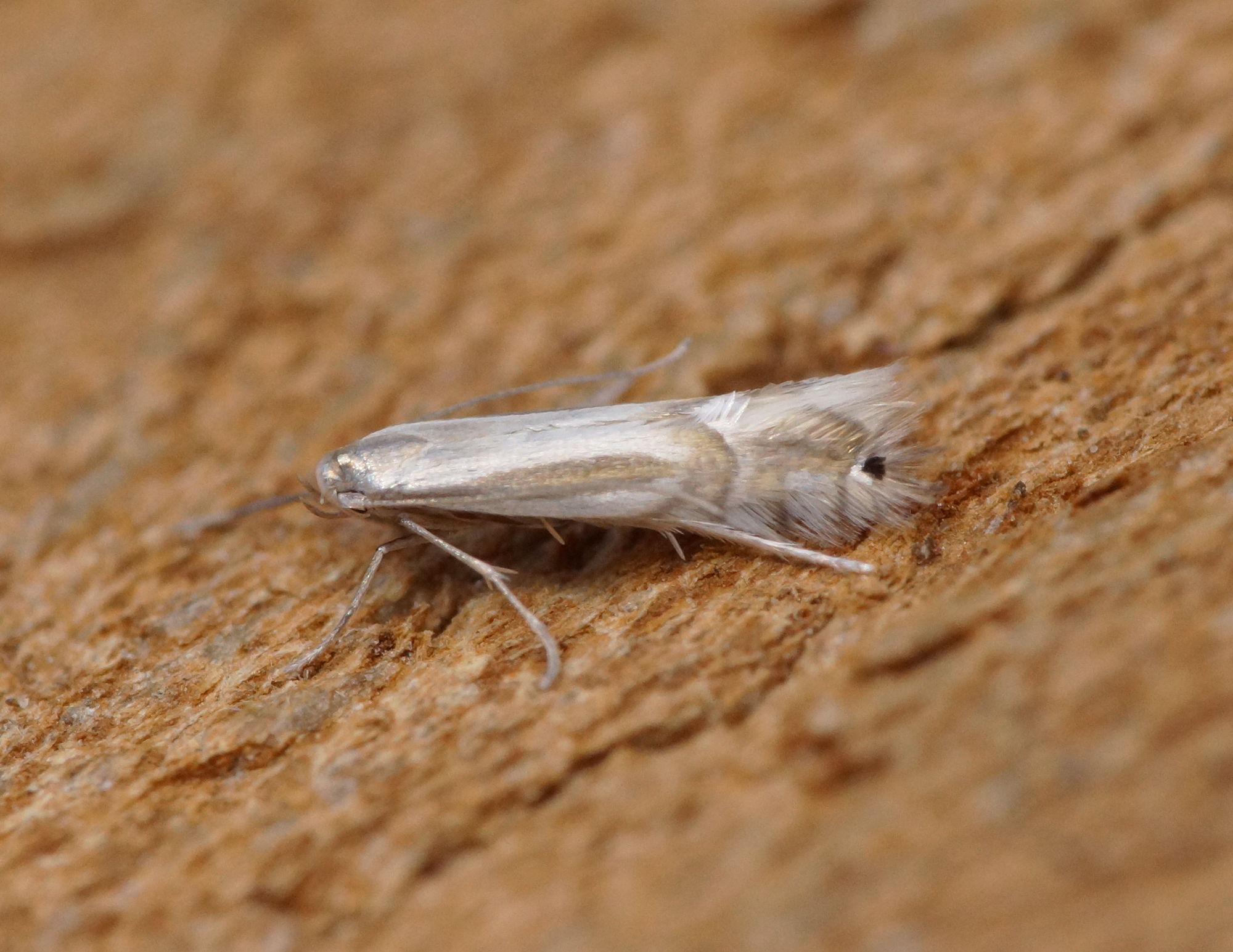

Scientific classification
- Kingdom: Animalia
- Phylum: Arthropoda
- Clade: Pancrustacea
- Class: Insecta
- Order: Lepidoptera
- Family: Gracillariidae
- Genus: Phyllocnistis
- Species: P. saligna

Binomial name
- Phyllocnistis saligna (Zeller, 1839)

Synonyms
- Opostega saligna Zeller, 1839

= Phyllocnistis saligna =

Species of moth

Phyllocnistis saligna is a moth of the family Gracillariidae. It is known from almost all Europe (except Ireland and possibly also parts of the Balkan Peninsula), as well as India, Sri Lanka, La Réunion and South Africa.

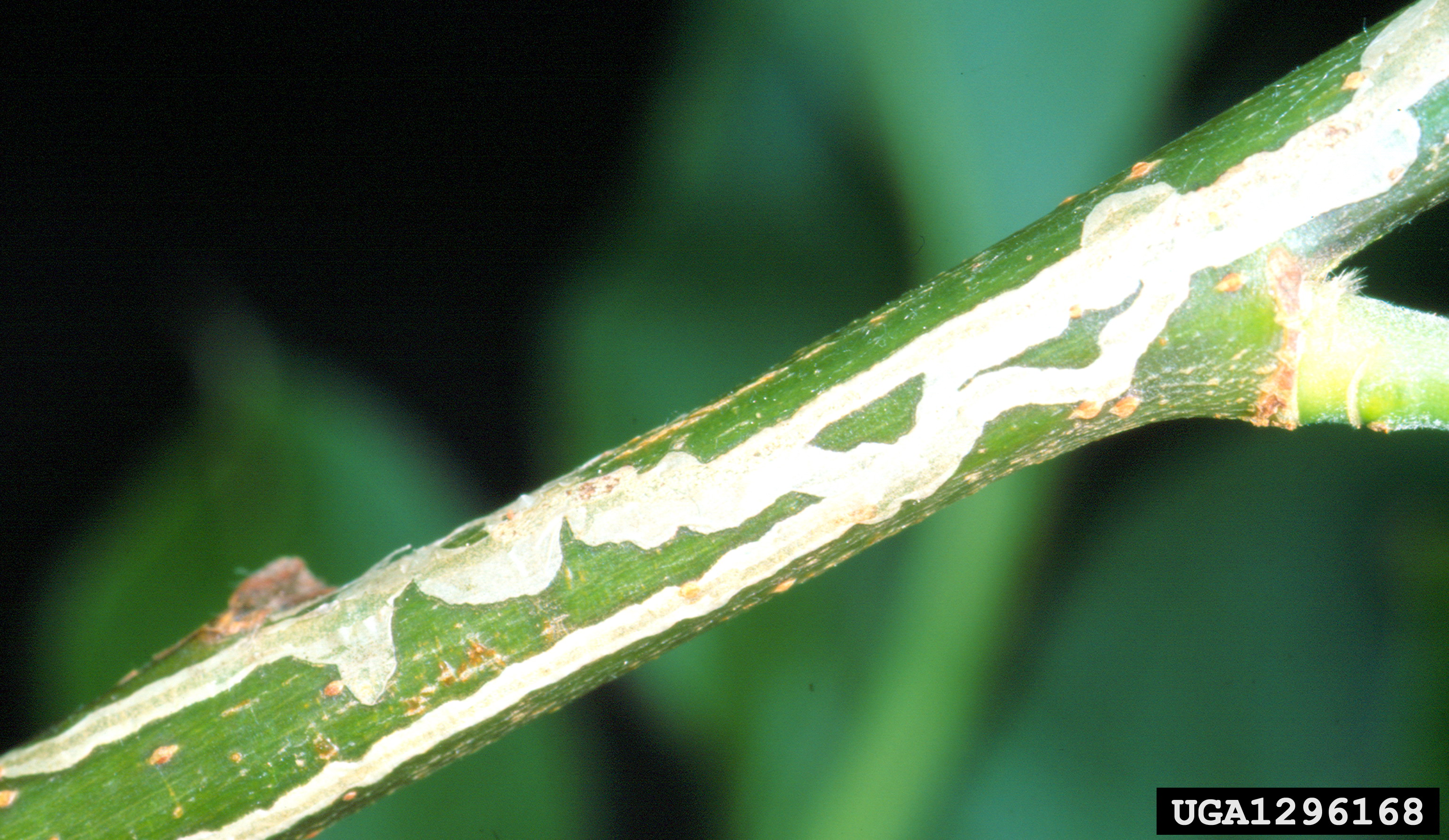
Damage

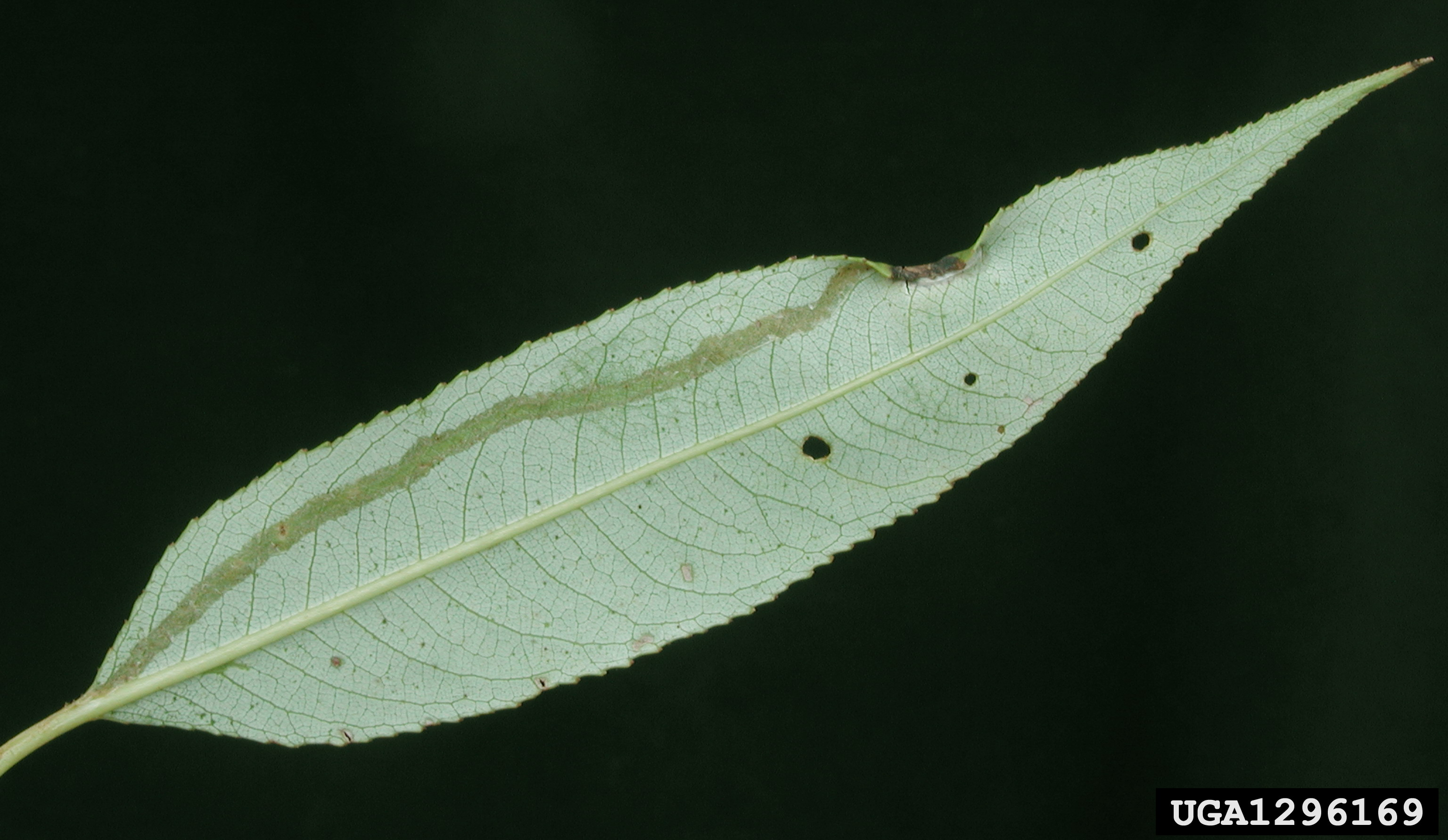
Damage

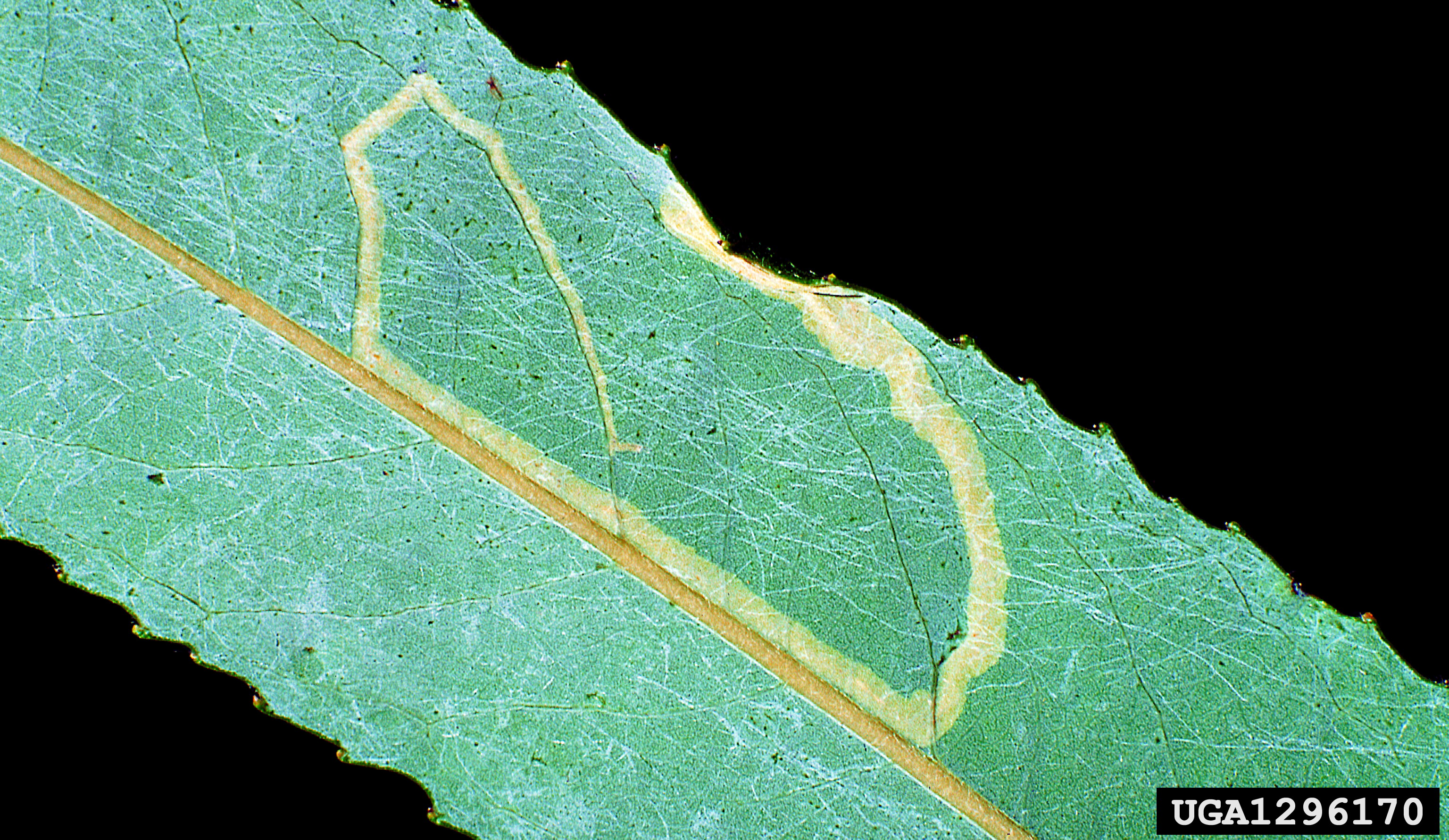
Damage

The wingspan is about 7 mm. Adults are on wing in two generations, in July and from September to April.

The larvae feed on Salix alba, Salix babylonica, Salix daphnoides, Salix × fragilis, Salix lanata, Salix matsudana, Salix purpurea, Salix × sepulcralis, Salix triandra and Salix viminalis. They mine the leaves of their host plant.
