= Stigmella nivenburgensis =

Scientific classification
- Kingdom: Animalia
- Phylum: Arthropoda
- Class: Insecta
- Order: Lepidoptera
- Family: Nepticulidae
- Genus: Stigmella
- Species: S. nivenburgensis

Binomial name
- Stigmella nivenburgensis (Preissecker, 1942)

Synonyms
- Nepticula nivenburgensis Preissecker, 1942

Species of moth

Stigmella nivenburgensis is a moth of the family Nepticulidae. It is found from Lithuania and central Russia to the Iberian Peninsula, Italy and Greece. It has also reported from Turkmenistan.

There are at least three generations on Rhodes.

The larvae feed on Salix alba, S. babylonica, Salix x fragilis, Salix x salamonii (Note: A Salix of the Sepulcralis Group) and S. triandra.
