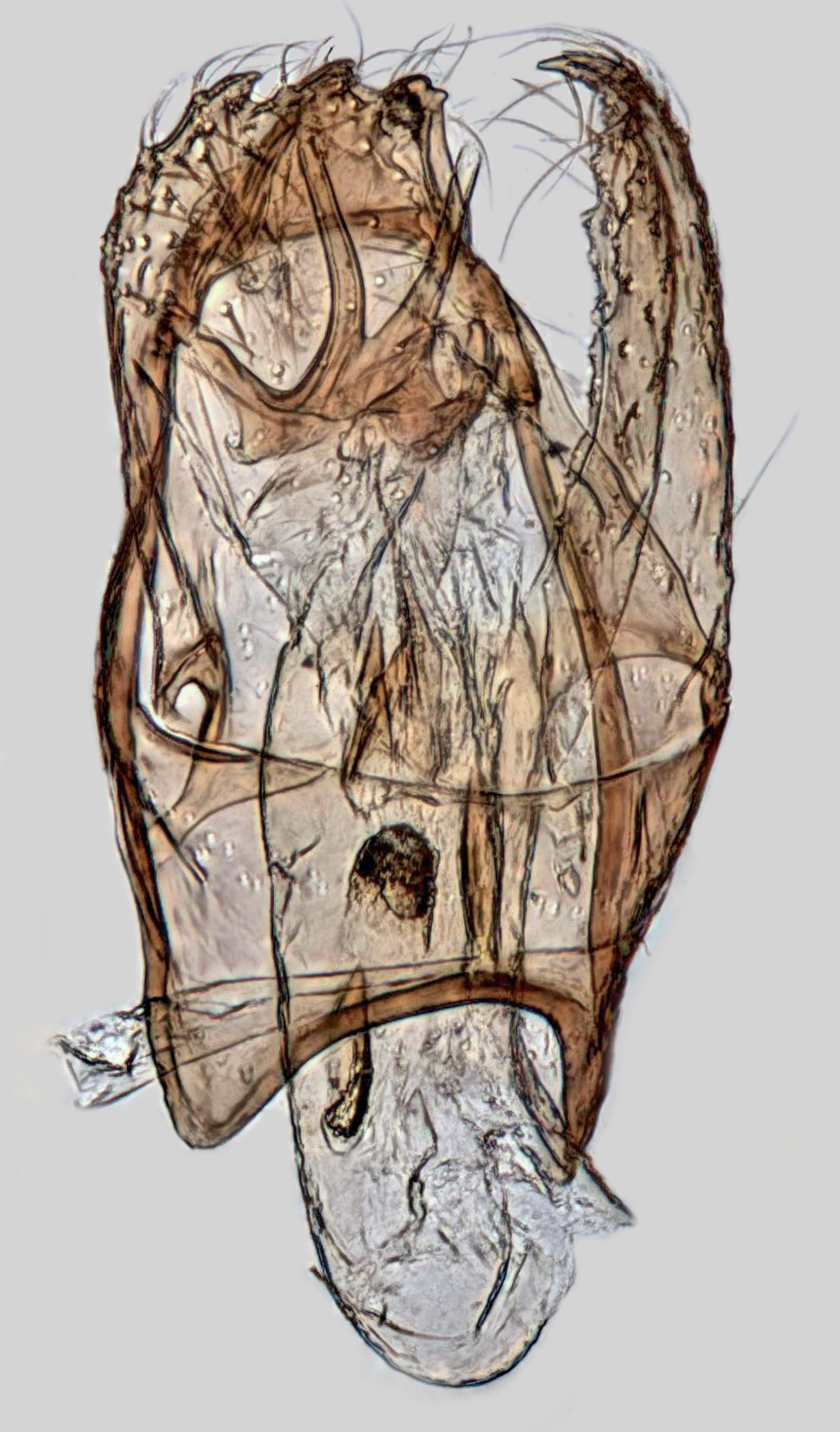
- Genitalia preparations of Stigmella species are essential for certain determination

Scientific classification
- Kingdom: Animalia
- Phylum: Arthropoda
- Class: Insecta
- Order: Lepidoptera
- Family: Nepticulidae
- Genus: Stigmella
- Species: S. obliquella

Binomial name
- Stigmella obliquella (Heinemann, 1862)

Synonyms
- List: Nepticula obliquella Heinemann, 1862; Nepticula babylonicae Hartig, 1949; Nepticula diversa Glitz, 1872; Nepticula wockeella Heinemann, 1871

= Stigmella obliquella =

Species of moth

Stigmella obliquella is a moth of the family Nepticulidae which feeds on willow (Salix species) and can be found in Asia and Europe. It was first described by Hermann von Heinemann in 1862.

== Description ==
The wingspan is 4.6–6 mm.A small, dark moth. The head is covered with yellow, hair-like scales, the enlarged first antennae joint and the collar are white. The body and forewing are blackish-brown, the forewing has a cream-coloured transverse band in the middle that is narrower in the middle. The hind wing is grey. The larva is yellow. Meyrick - The head is orange, the collar yellow-white. Antennal eyecaps yellow-white. Forewings are coarse, dark brown basal to the yellowish cross fascia, apex black. Hindwings grey. The morphology of the genitalia must be examined for certain determination.

Adults are on wing from April to May and again in August.

=== Eggs ===
Laid on either side of a leaf of one of the smooth-leaved willows in May–June or August–September.

=== Larva ===
The larva is amber-yellow with a brown head and has a faint chain of pear-shaped dark ventral spots.

The larvae feed on Salix alba, S. babylonica, Salix x sepulcralis 'Chrysocoma', Salix x fragilis, S. pentandra, S. triandra and S. viminalis.

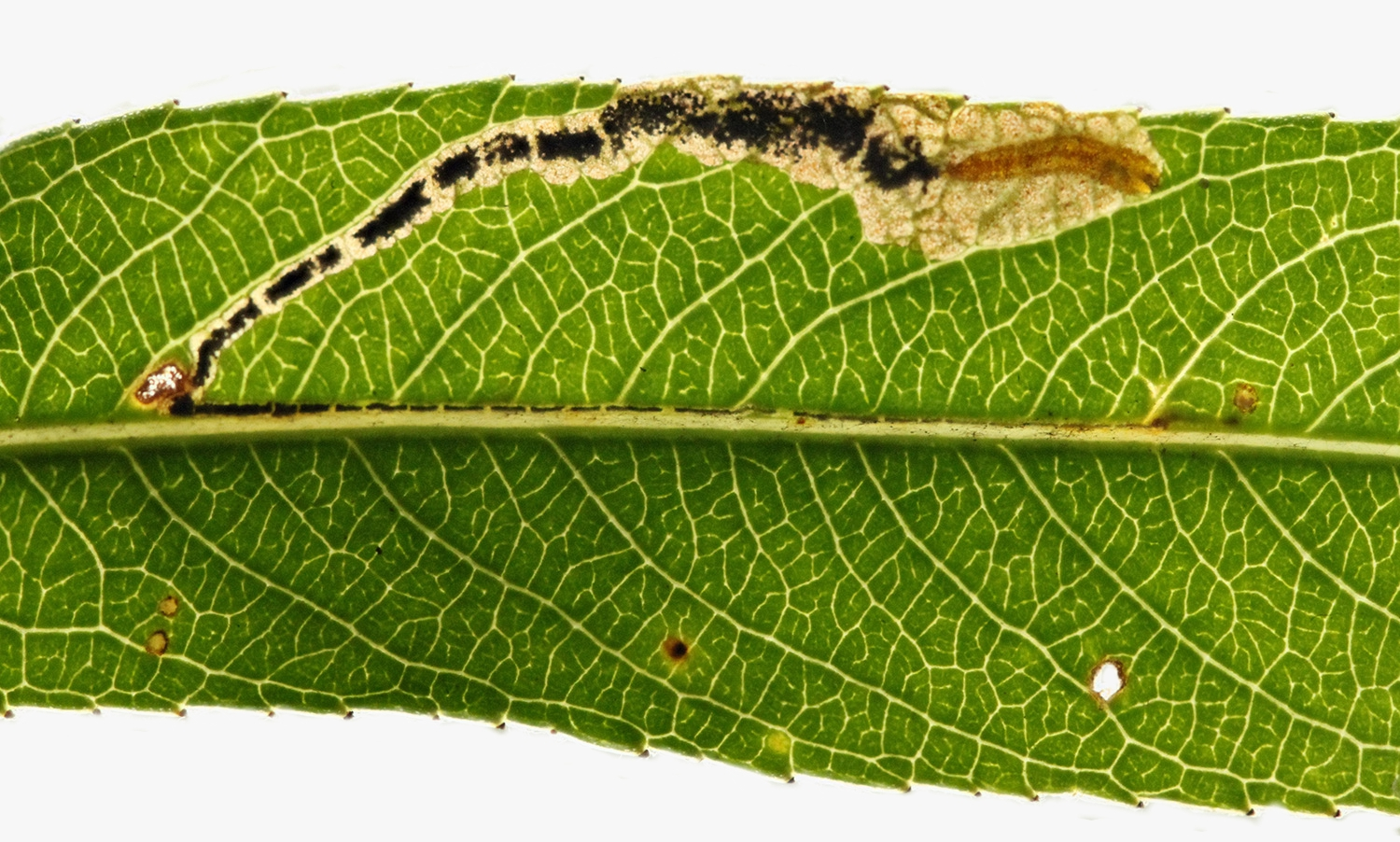
Stigmella obliquella mine

=== Pupa ===
Pupation takes place outside of the mine.

== Distribution ==
It is found in all of Europe (except the Balkan Peninsula), east to eastern Russia and China.
