= Salix 'Chrysocoma' =

Species of tree

Salix × sepulcralis 'Chrysocoma'
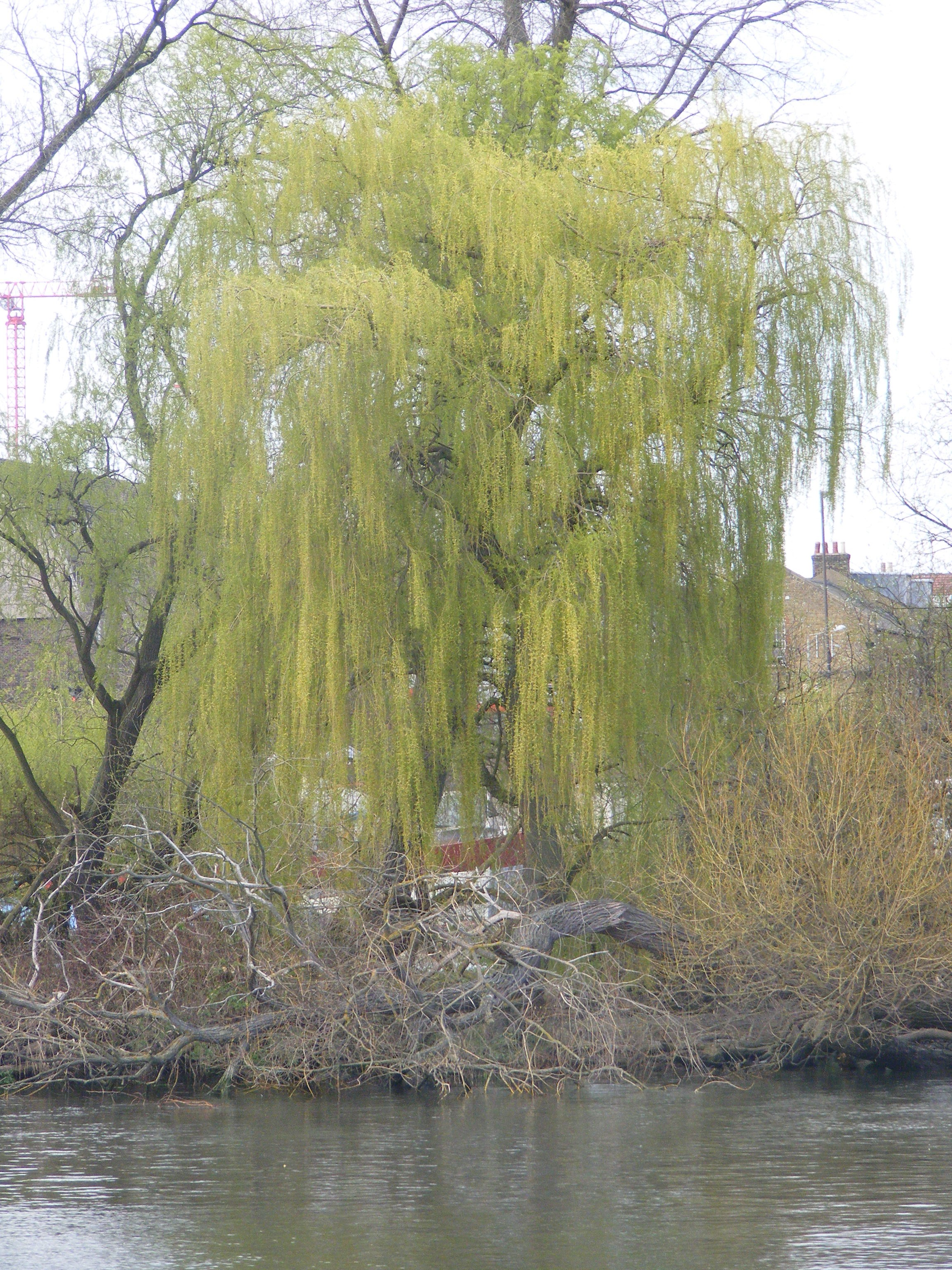
- Weeping golden willow
- Hybrid parentage: S. alba 'Vitellina' × S. babylonica
- Cultivar: 'Chrysocoma'

Salix × sepulcralis 'Chrysocoma', or Weeping Golden Willow, is the most popular and widely grown weeping tree in the warm temperate regions of the world. It is an artificial hybrid between S. alba 'Vitellina' and S. babylonica. The first parent provides the frost hardiness and the golden shoots and the second parent the strong weeping habit.
This cross was originally made at the Späth Nursery (Berlin, Germany) and was first mentioned in their 1888 nursery catalogue as S. vitellina pendula nova.
Being a cultivar from the Chrysocoma Group, which includes all crosses between S. alba and S. babylonica, it is much hardier and more long-lived than the Babylon Willow (Salix babylonica). This particular cultivar is easily distinguished from the other Golden Weeping Willow (S. × sepulcralis) by its androgynous catkins.

== Description ==
A weeping tree, not much more than 22m high. Bark greyish-brown, deeply fissured. Twigs very slender, at first thinly subadpressed pubescent, soon becoming glabrous. Golden- or greenish-yellow in their first year, later becoming olive-green. Catkins appearing with the leaves in April, terminal on very short, spreading, leafy, lateral shoots, peduncle and rhachis softly villose. Catkins male, female or most commonly androgynous.

== Synonymy ==
- Salix x pendulina f. tristis. This is the currently preferred name used by IPNI and POWO.
- Salix alba 'Vitellina Pendula'
- Salix babylonica 'Ramulis Aureis'
- Salix × chrysocoma Dode, Bull. Soc. Bot. France 55: 655 (1908 publ. 1909).
- Salix × sepulcralis nothovar. chrysocoma (Dode) Meikle, Watsonia 15: 274 (1985).
- Salix vitellina pendula Späth, Cat. (1888).
- [Salix alba 'Tristis'] This name is often misapplied to this cultivar.

== Gallery ==
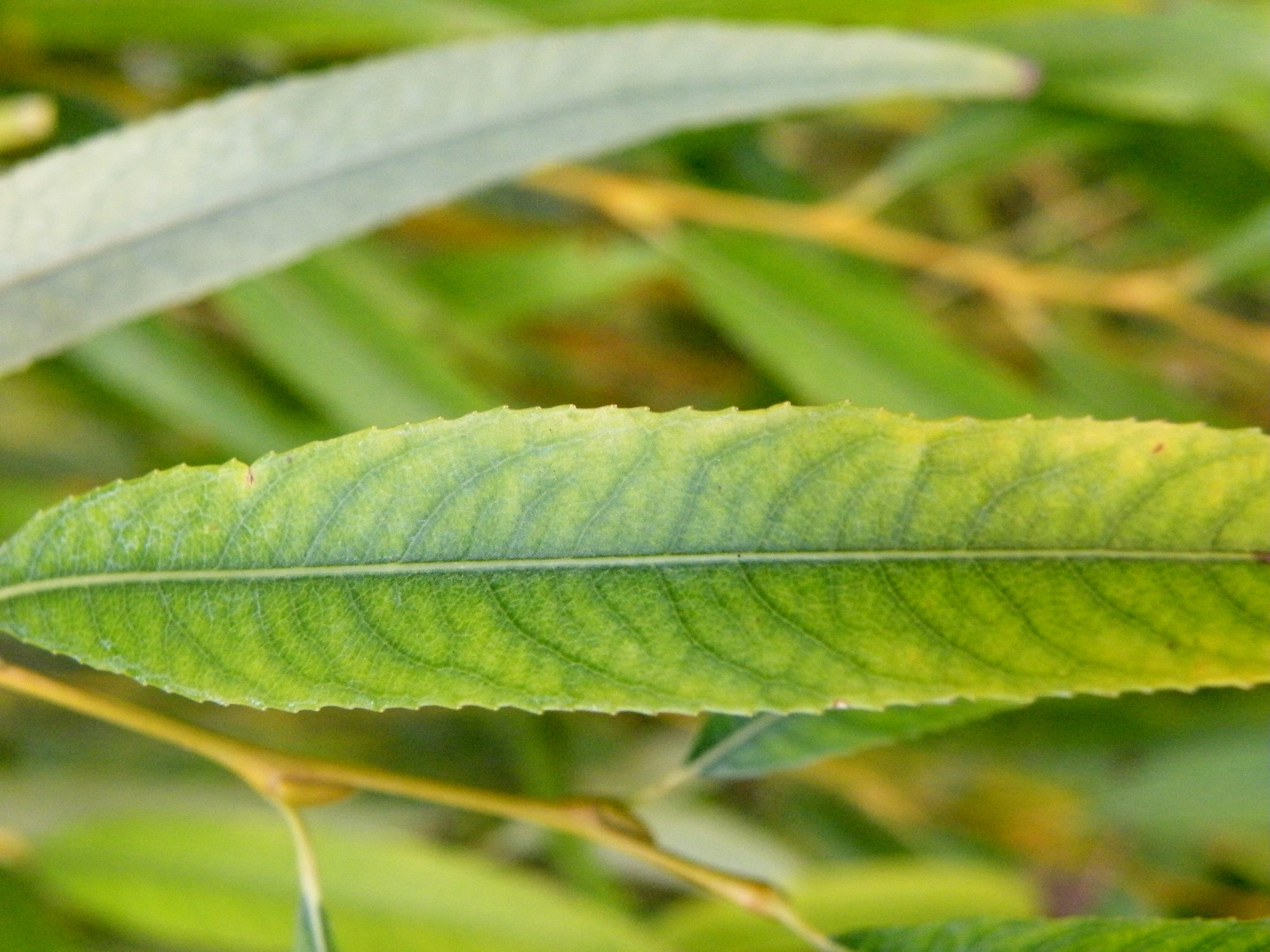
Leaf (Salix chrysocoma)

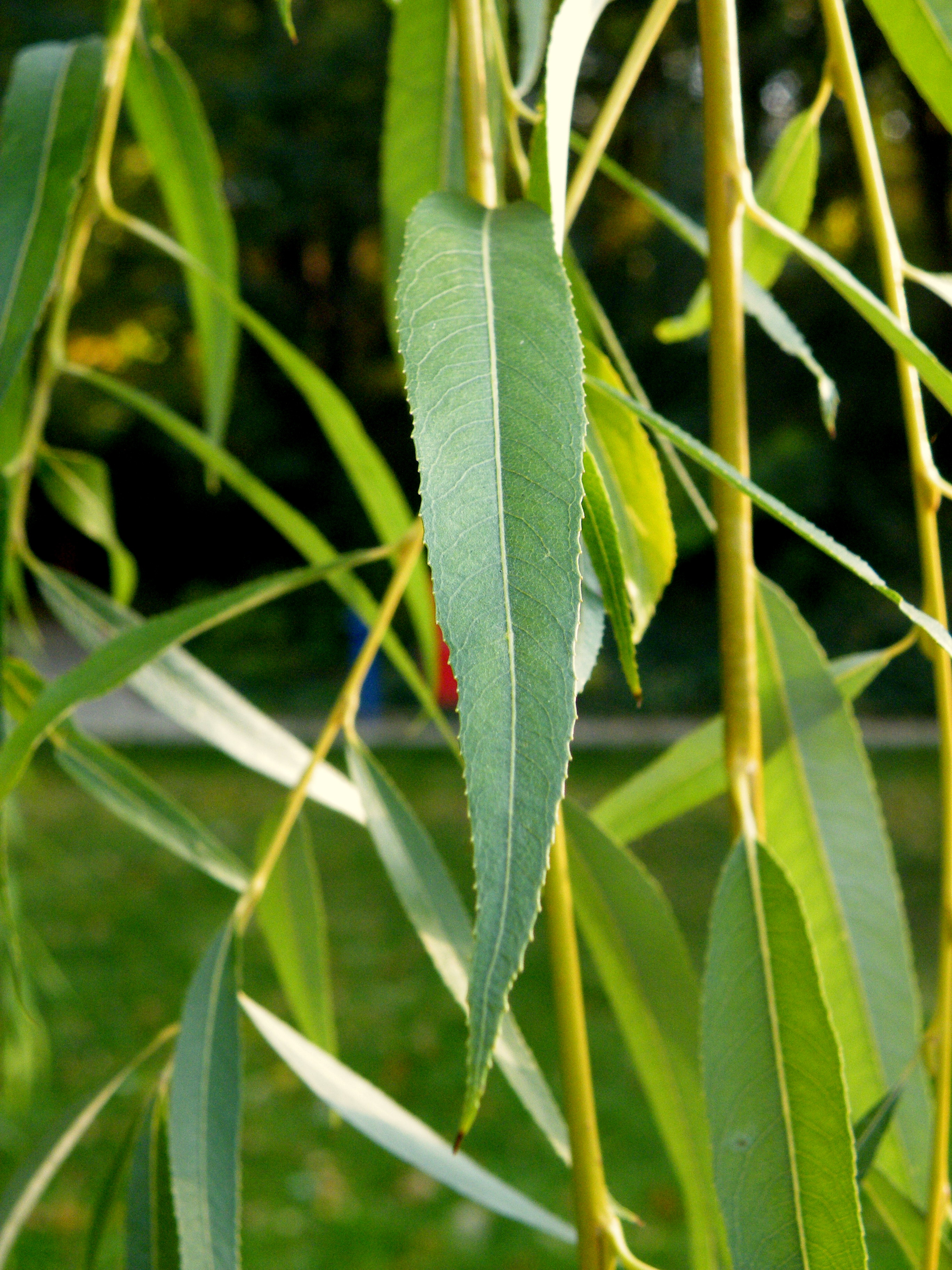
Leaf(Salix chrysocoma)

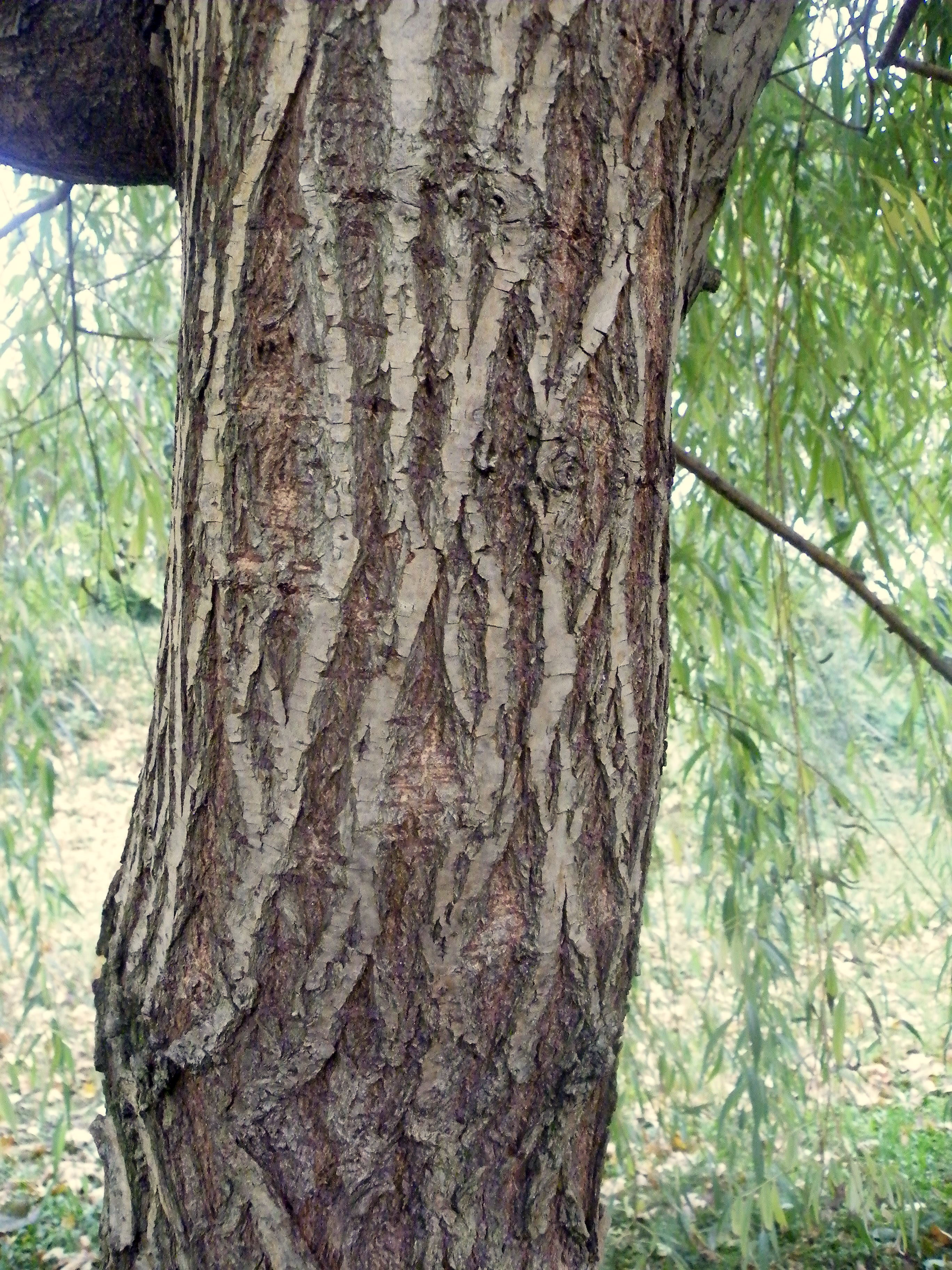
Trunk (Salix chrysocoma)

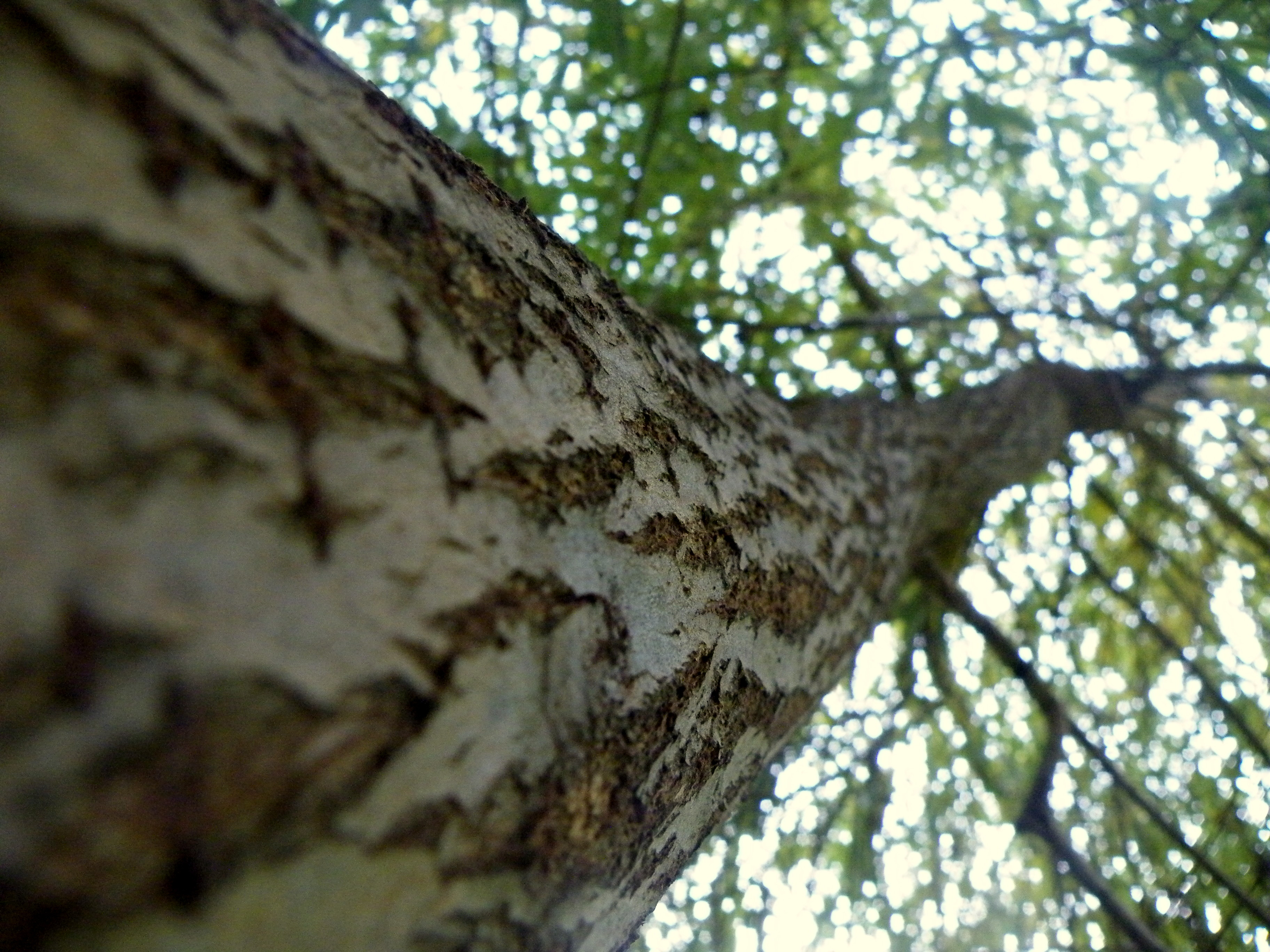
Salix chrysocoma

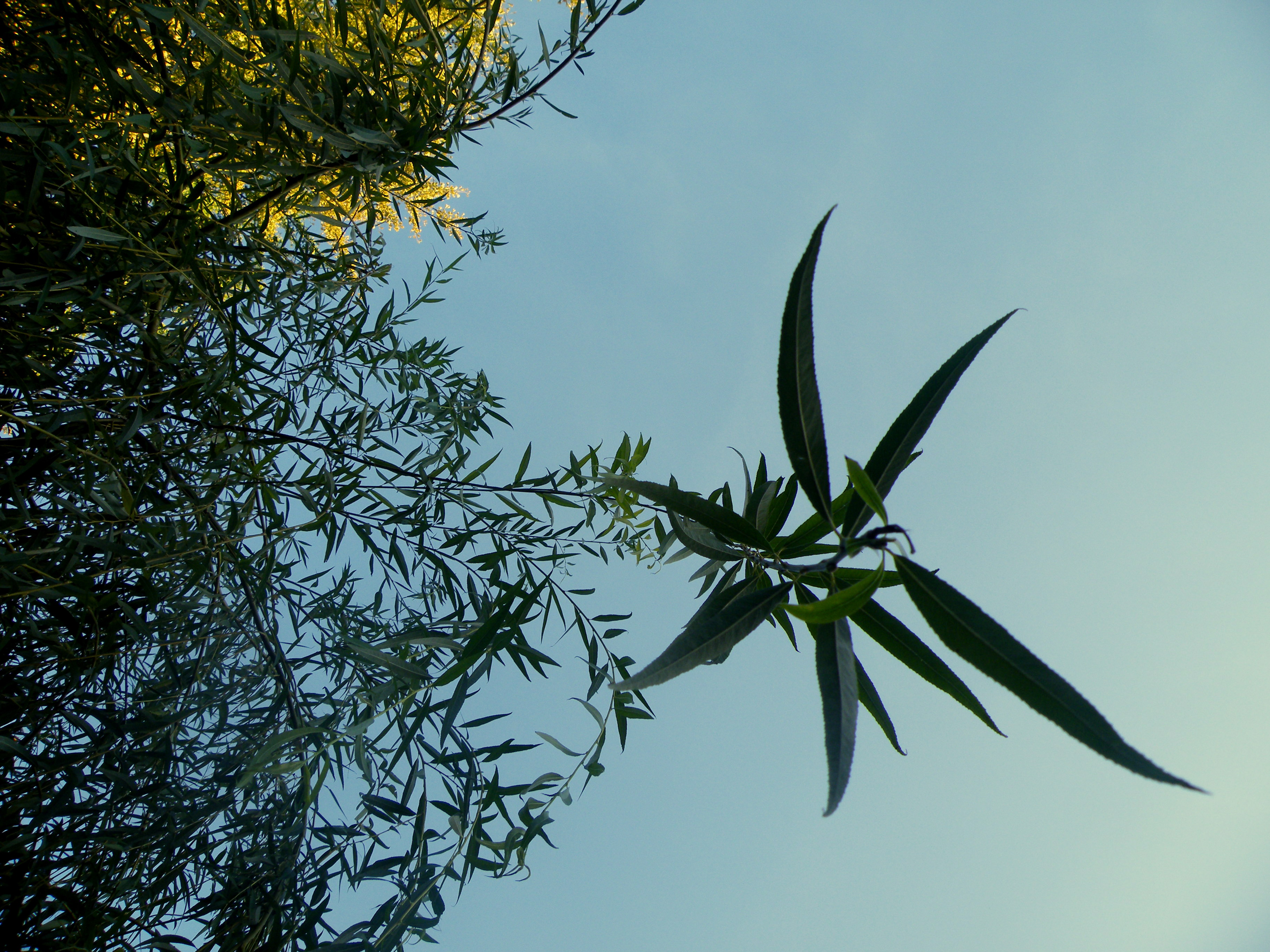
Leaves (Salix chrysocoma)

== See also ==
- Salix Sepulcralis Group
- Salix babylonica: Horticultural selections and related hybrids
- Salix alba: Varieties, cultivars and hybrids
- Weeping tree

== Notes ==
This taxonomy has been revised by Belyaeva et al. (2018, 2021), and the accepted name is Salix x pendulina f. tristis
