= Salix Sepulcralis Group =

Group of plant cultivars

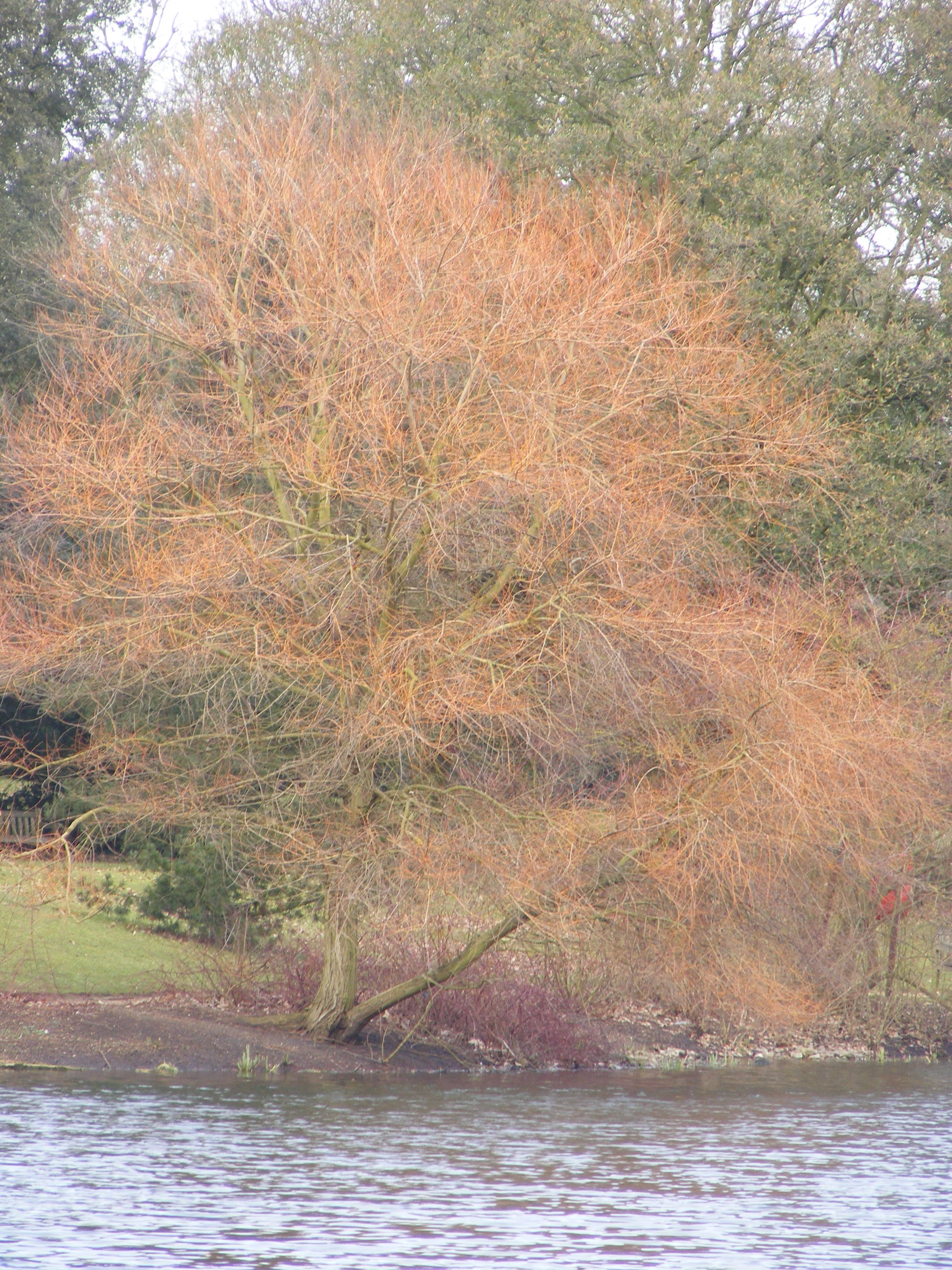
- In Kew Gardens, England
- Hybrid parentage: S. alba × S. babylonica

The Salix Sepulcralis Group is a cultivar group containing all cultivars of hybrids between Salix alba and Salix babylonica. The trees in this group are sometimes referred to as white weeping willow or glaucous weeping willow in reference to the mixed appearance from the parent species. It was first described by L. Simonkai in 1890 from trees growing in Romania. The group contains both weeping and nonweeping cultivars, though the best-known of its cultivars is 'Chrysocoma', the most widely grown weeping tree.
Some of the cultivars are hybrids of S. babylonica var. matsudana 'Tortuosa' and have inherited from its parent the twisted and contorted branches, as well as being more cold-tolerant, as S. babylonica var. matsudana is native to northern China and Korea.

== Description ==
These trees are usually no more than 12 m (39 ft) tall. Leaves are finely serrulate, pubescent or silky when young. Ovaries are short and flask-shaped, not much longer than the subtending catkin scale. They are usually intermediate between the parent species, showing the typical weeping willow appearance with leaves that are pale glaucous below. But as an ornamental tree with high diversity, trees may look closer to either parent or different entirely.

== Synonymy ==
- Salix × sepulcralis Simonk., Természetrajzi Füz. 12: 157 (1890).

== Included cultivars ==
- 'Caradoc': Upright habit with twisted, orange-yellow winter branches
- 'Chrysocoma': Weeping habit with golden-yellow winter branches
- 'Dart's Snake': Upright habit with twisted, dark green winter branches
- 'Erythroflexuosa': Semiweeping habit with twisted, orange-red winter branches
- 'Salamonii': Weeping habit with olive-brown winter branches
- 'Sepulcralis': Upright habit with orange-brown winter branches
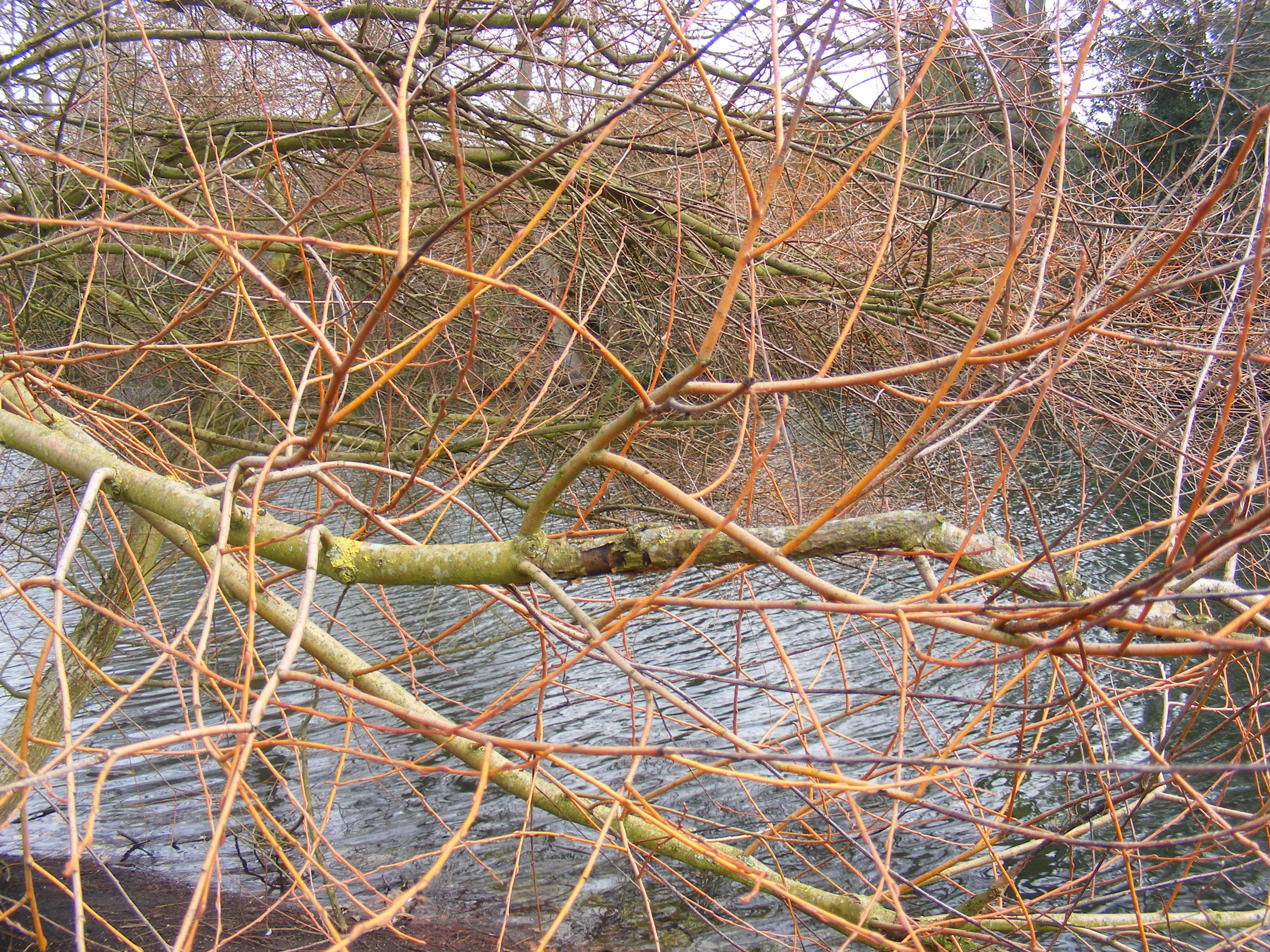
S. sepulcralis group 'Sepulcralis' - detail of winter branches
