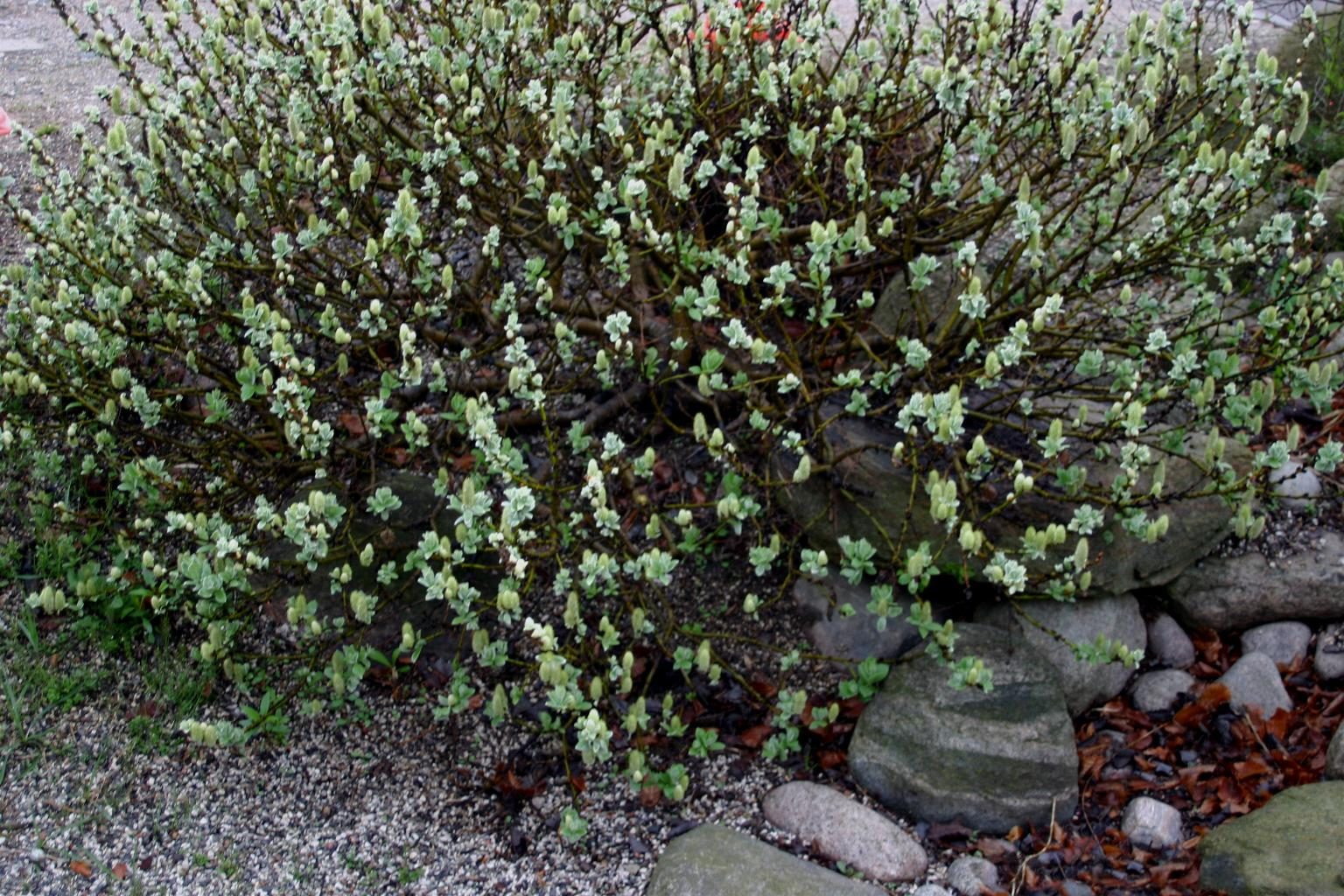

Conservation status
- Least Concern (IUCN 3.1)

Scientific classification
- Kingdom: Plantae
- Clade: Tracheophytes
- Clade: Angiosperms
- Clade: Eudicots
- Clade: Rosids
- Order: Malpighiales
- Family: Salicaceae
- Genus: Salix
- Species: S. lanata

Binomial name
- Salix lanata L.

= Salix lanata =

Species of willow

Salix lanata, the woolly willow, is a subarctic species of willow native to Iceland, the Faeroe Islands and Finland, through to eastern Siberia. In Scotland it can be found in only a few localities of Perthshire, Angus and Aberdeenshire, generally on rocky mountain sides at altitudes of 600–900 m (1,969–2,953 ft).

== Description ==
Salix lanata is a low, many-branched, deciduous shrub, generally less than 100 cm (39 in) high by 150 cm (59 in) broad. The new twigs are hairy at first, soon becoming hairless and brown. The grey-green leaves are rather variable, but generally ovate up to 7 cm (3 in) long by up to 6.5 cm (3 in) wide, covered in silvery-grey "wool" to begin with but less so with age. The leaf margins are usually entire.

The catkins appear in summer (May to July), with male and female catkins on separate plants (like all willows this species is dioecious). The female catkins are densely hairy. The petioles are usually less than 1 cm long, and the stipules usually 1 cm long by 0.6 cm wide, and persistent.

The texture, colour and compact nature of this plant, together with its extreme hardiness, make it a valuable plant for cultivation. It has gained the Royal Horticultural Society's Award of Garden Merit.

== Gallery ==
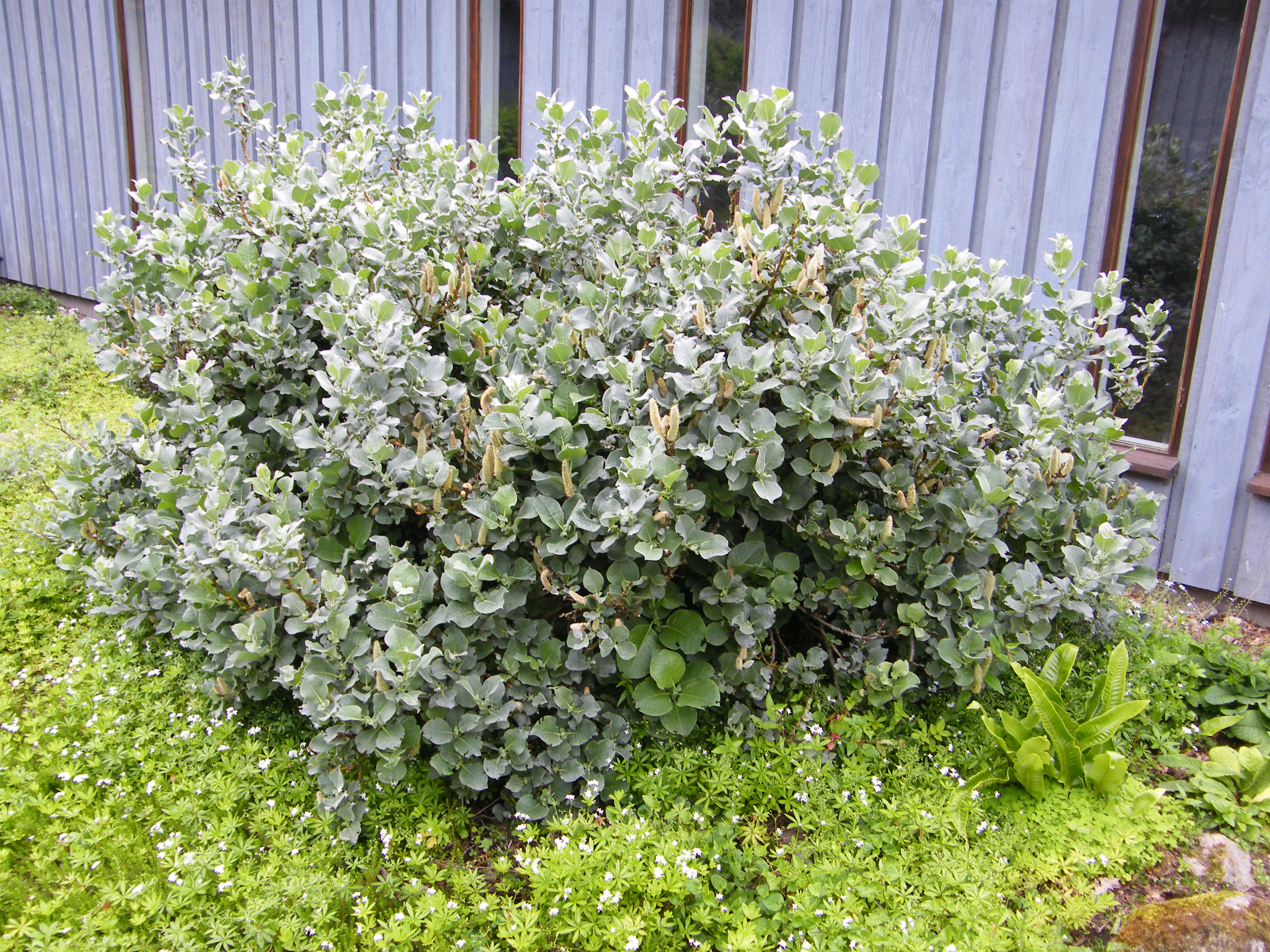

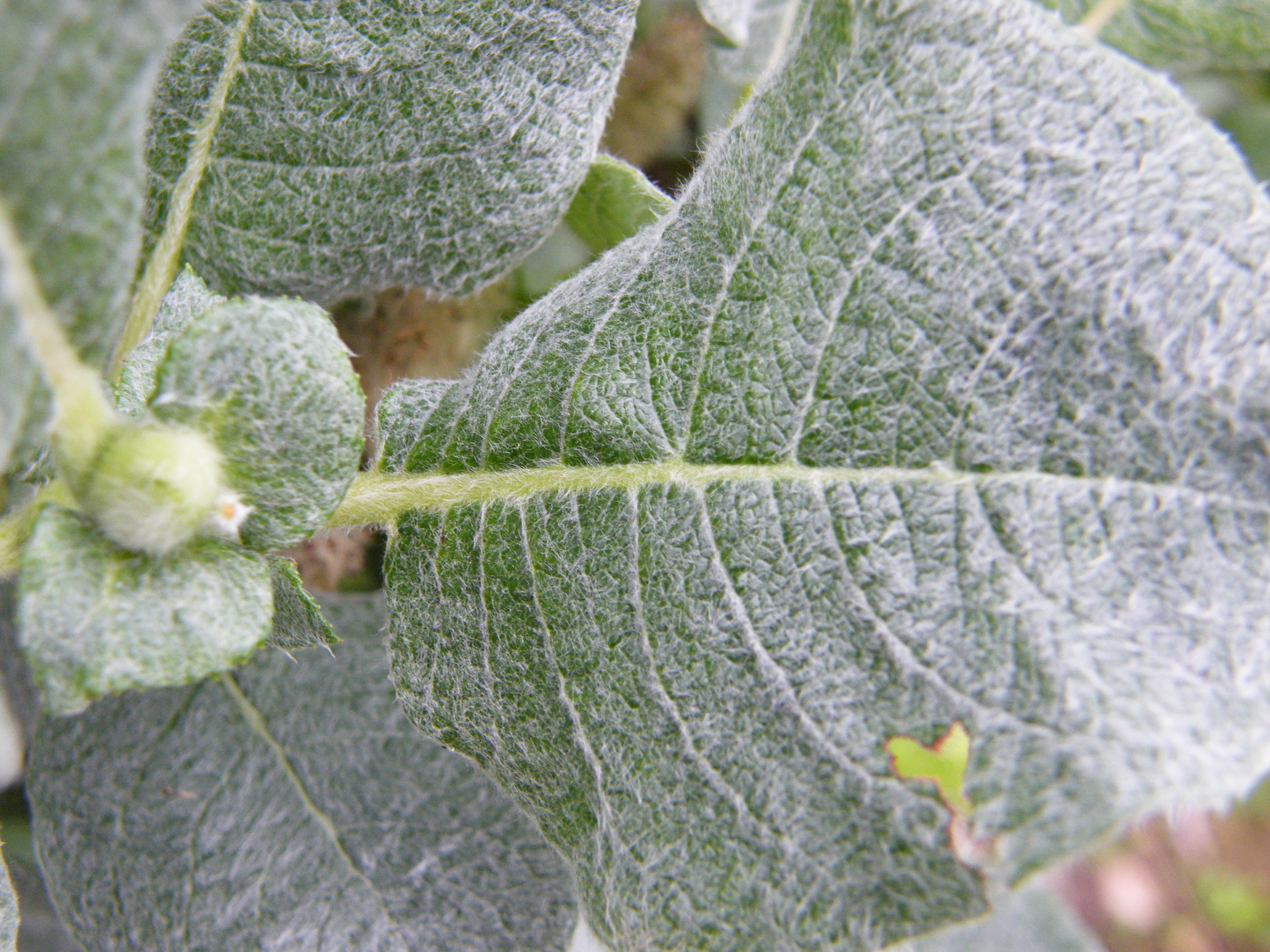

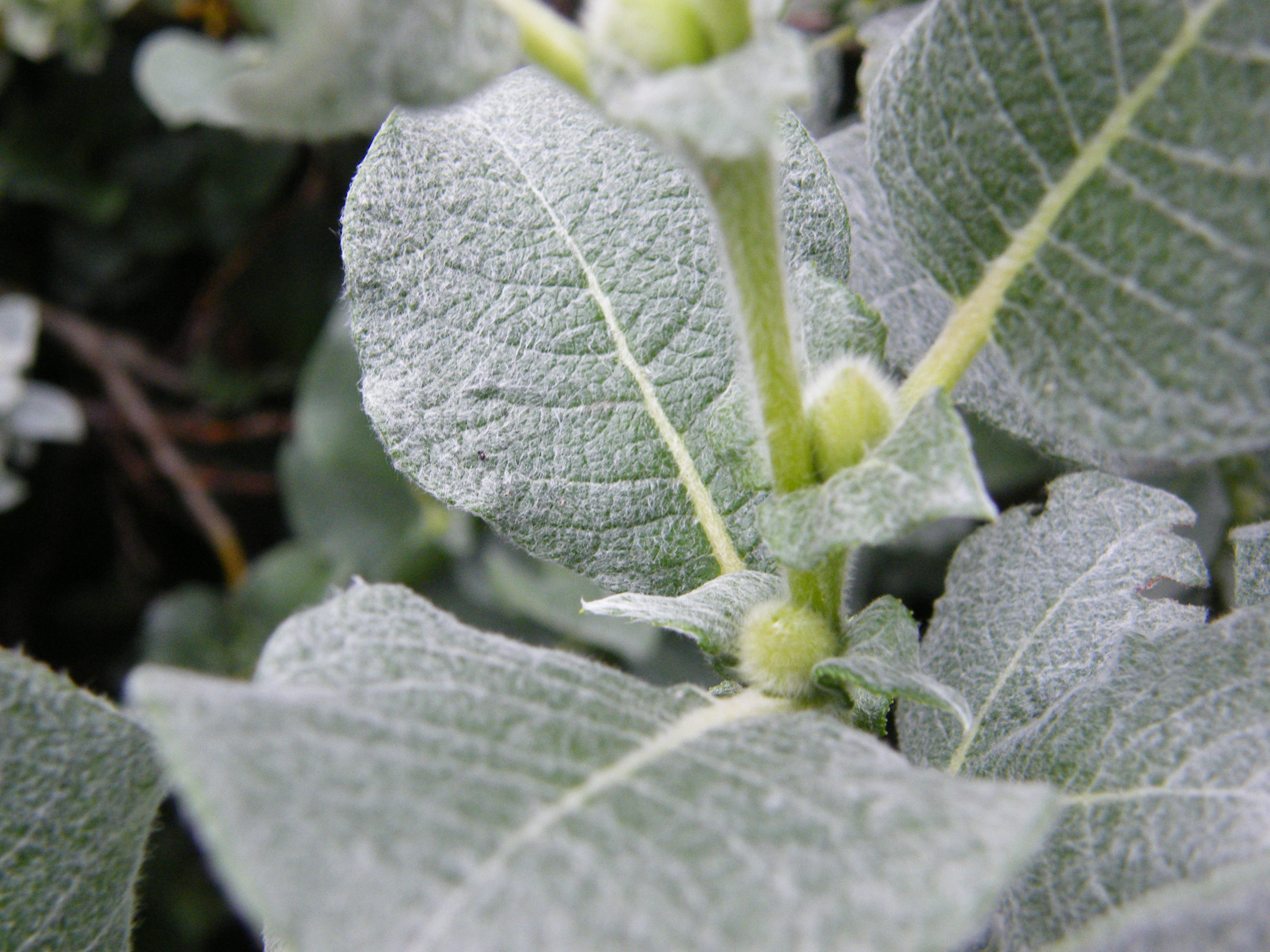
Upper surface of leaf, also showing stipules

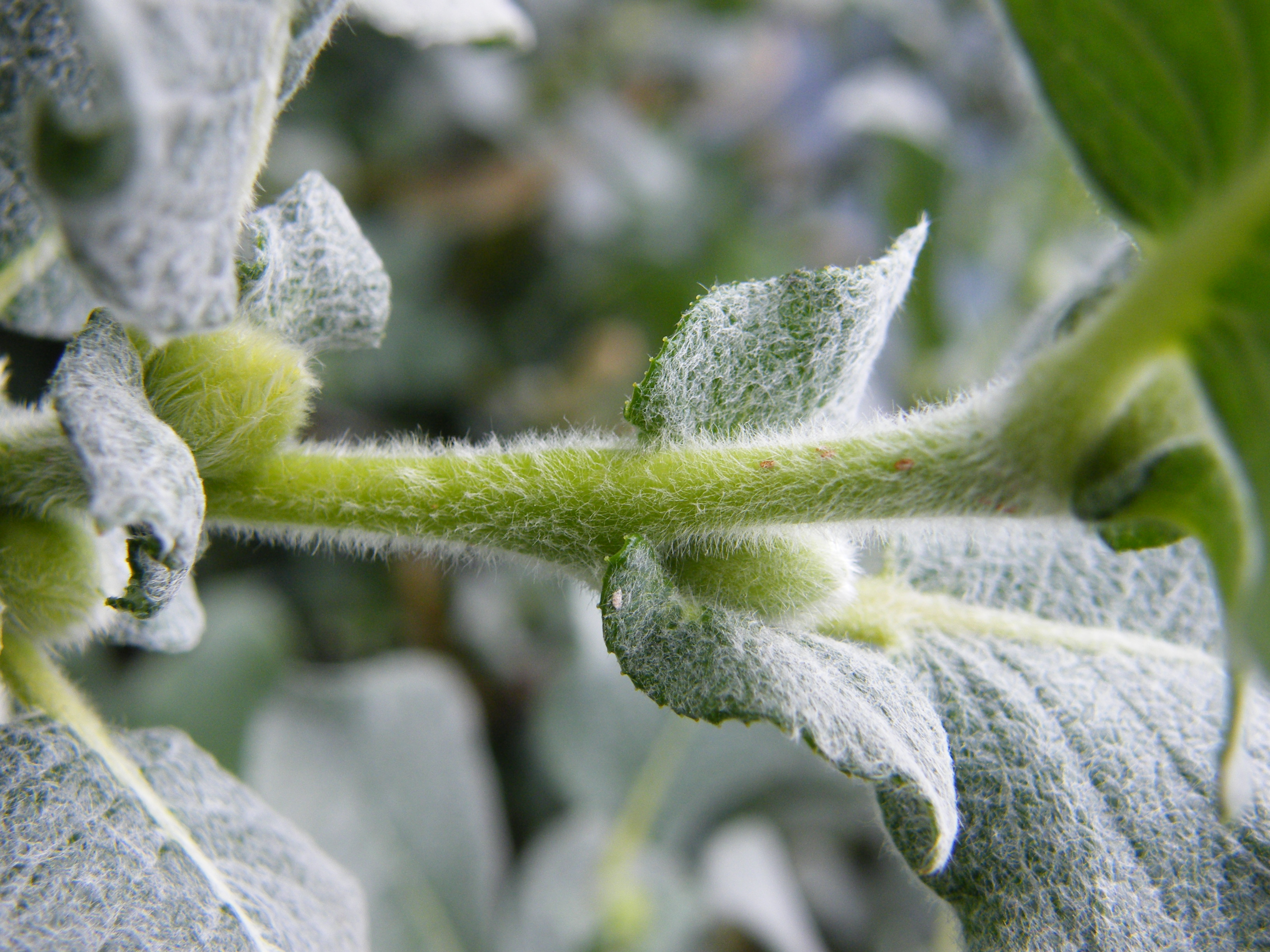
Leaf petiole

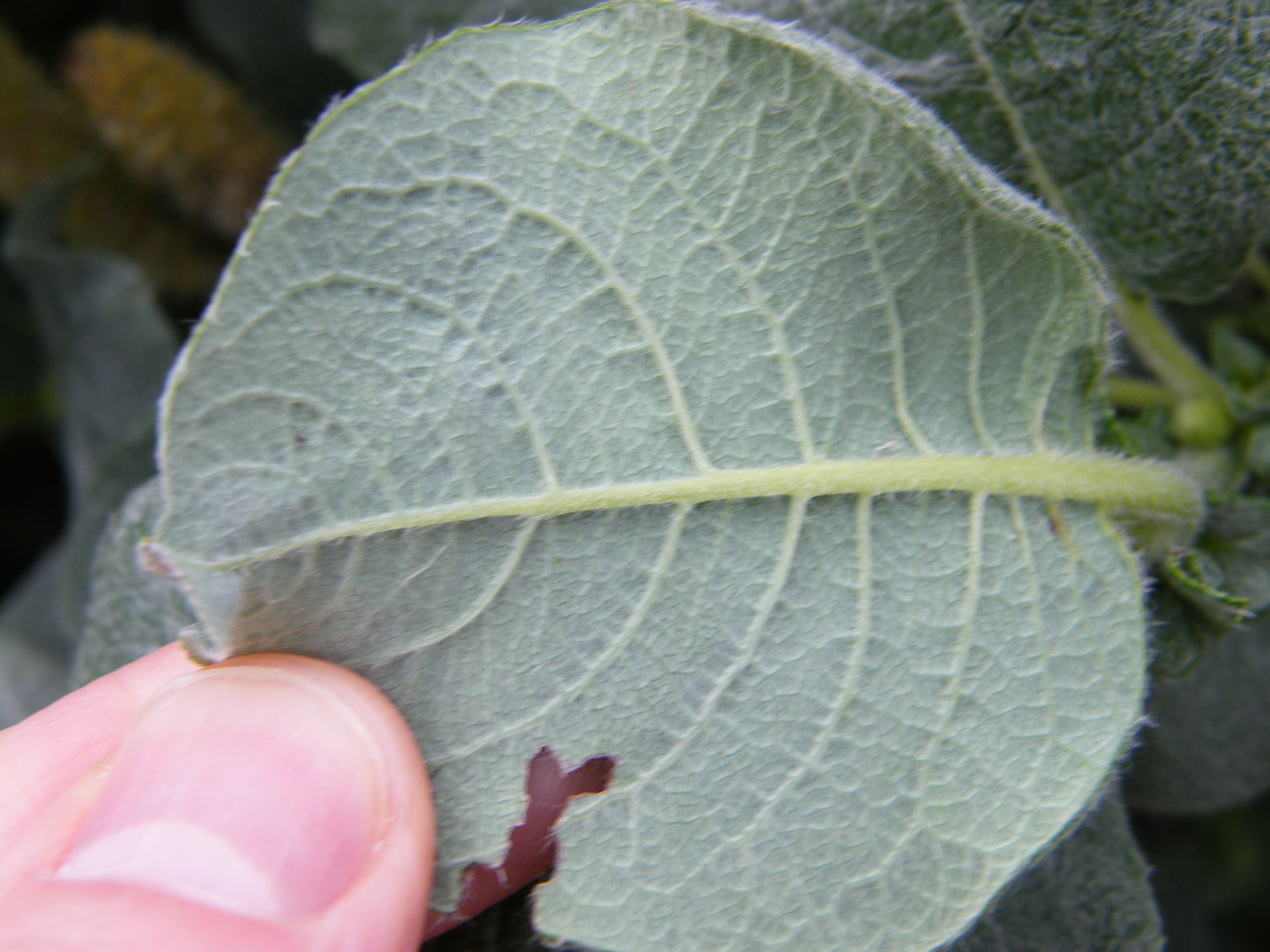
Lower surface of leaf

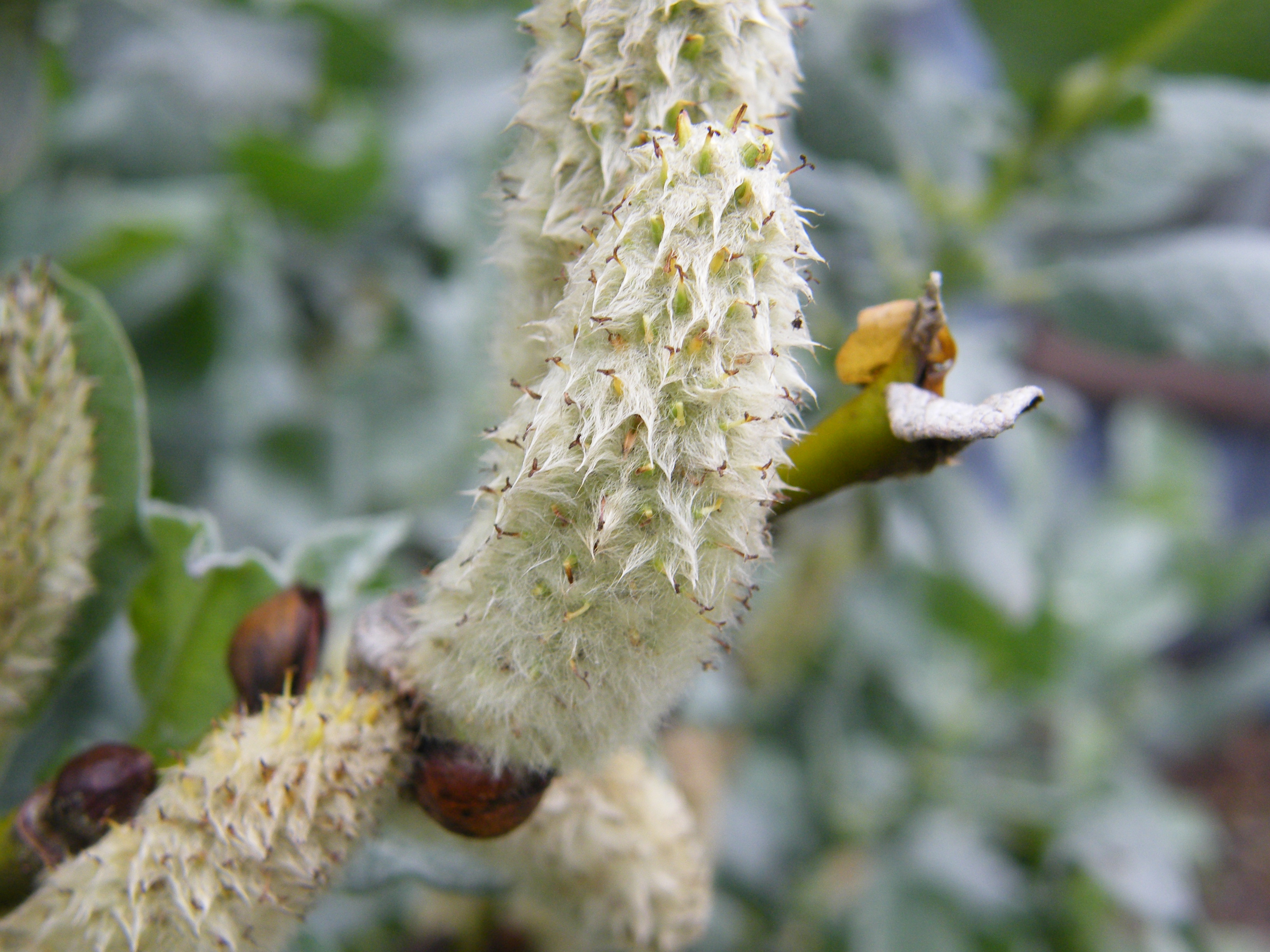
Female catkin

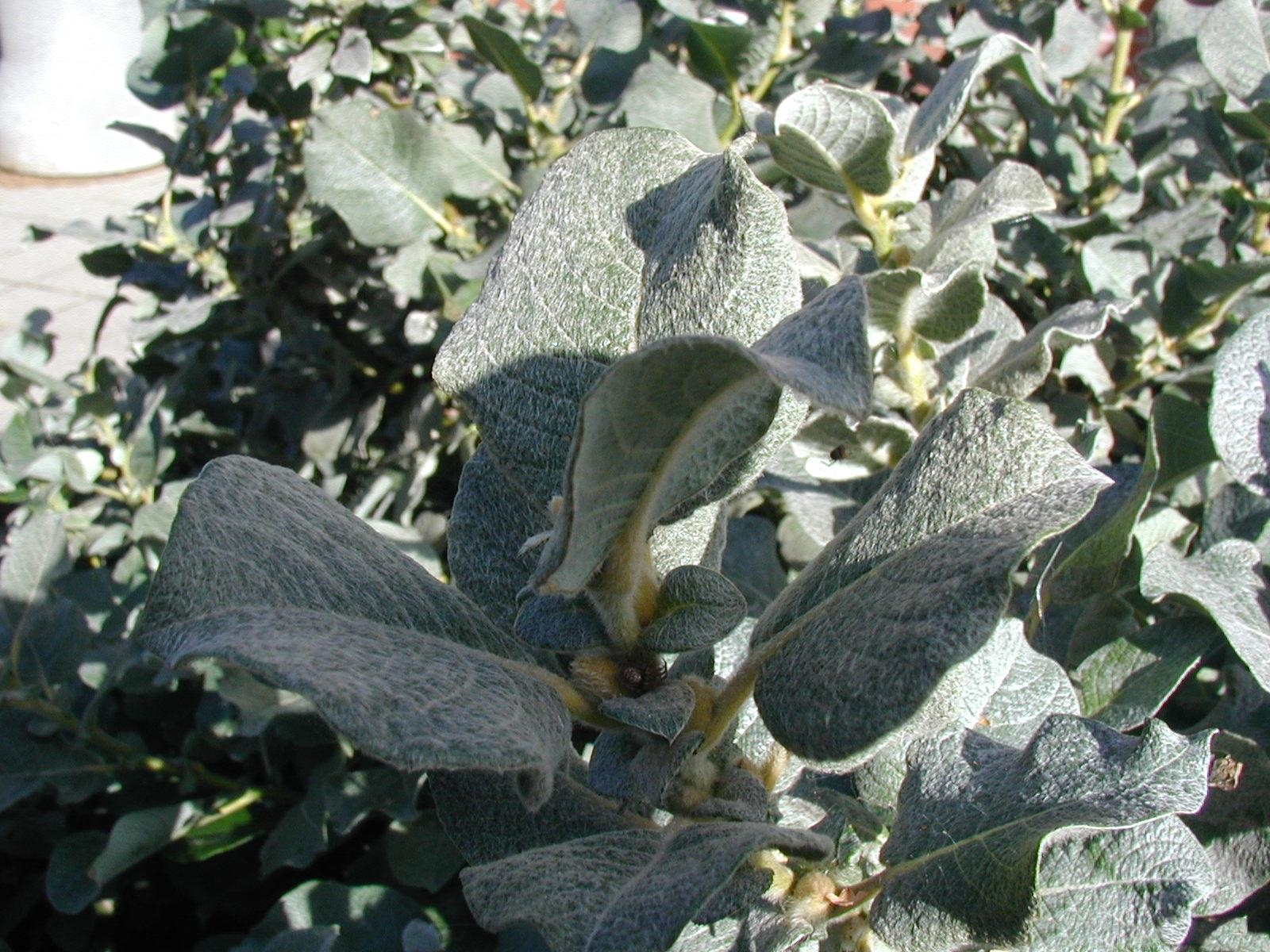
Salix lanata leaves
