= Rabdophaga clausilia =

Scientific classification
- Kingdom: Animalia
- Phylum: Arthropoda
- Class: Insecta
- Order: Diptera
- Family: Cecidomyiidae
- Genus: Rabdophaga
- Species: R. clausilia

Binomial name
- Rabdophaga clausilia (Bremi, 1847)

Synonyms
- Dasineura clausilia (Bremi, 1847); Rabdophaga inchbaldiana (Mik, 1886); Rhabdophaga clausilia (Bremi)

Species of fly

Rabdophaga clausilia is a gall midge which, depending on the source, forms galls on the leaves of willows (Salix species), or is an inquiline living in the galls of a Rabdophaga species, or a predator. It was first described by Johann Jacob Bremi-Wolf in 1847.

== History ==
There is some confusion as to which genus clausilia belongs to. The Natural History Museum, London and Redfern et al (2011) put the insect in the genus Rabdophaga, while Ellis W N, in the Plant Parasites of Europe website, places it in Dasineura. Unfortunately the original description of the species is "unrecognisable" and the type species is missing.

== Appearance of the gall ==
According to Redfern et al (2011), the gall is found on leaves and is a short, downward, hairless, roll containing one yellowish-red larva. The roll is half-moon shaped and several rolls may run together containing several larvae. In Great Britain the gall is found on white willow (Salix alba) and looks similar to the galls of D. auritae and R. marginemtorquens. Elsewhere it has been recorded on goat willow (S. caprea), European violet-willow (S. daphnoides), olive willow (S. elaeagnos) and purple willow (S. purpurea).
