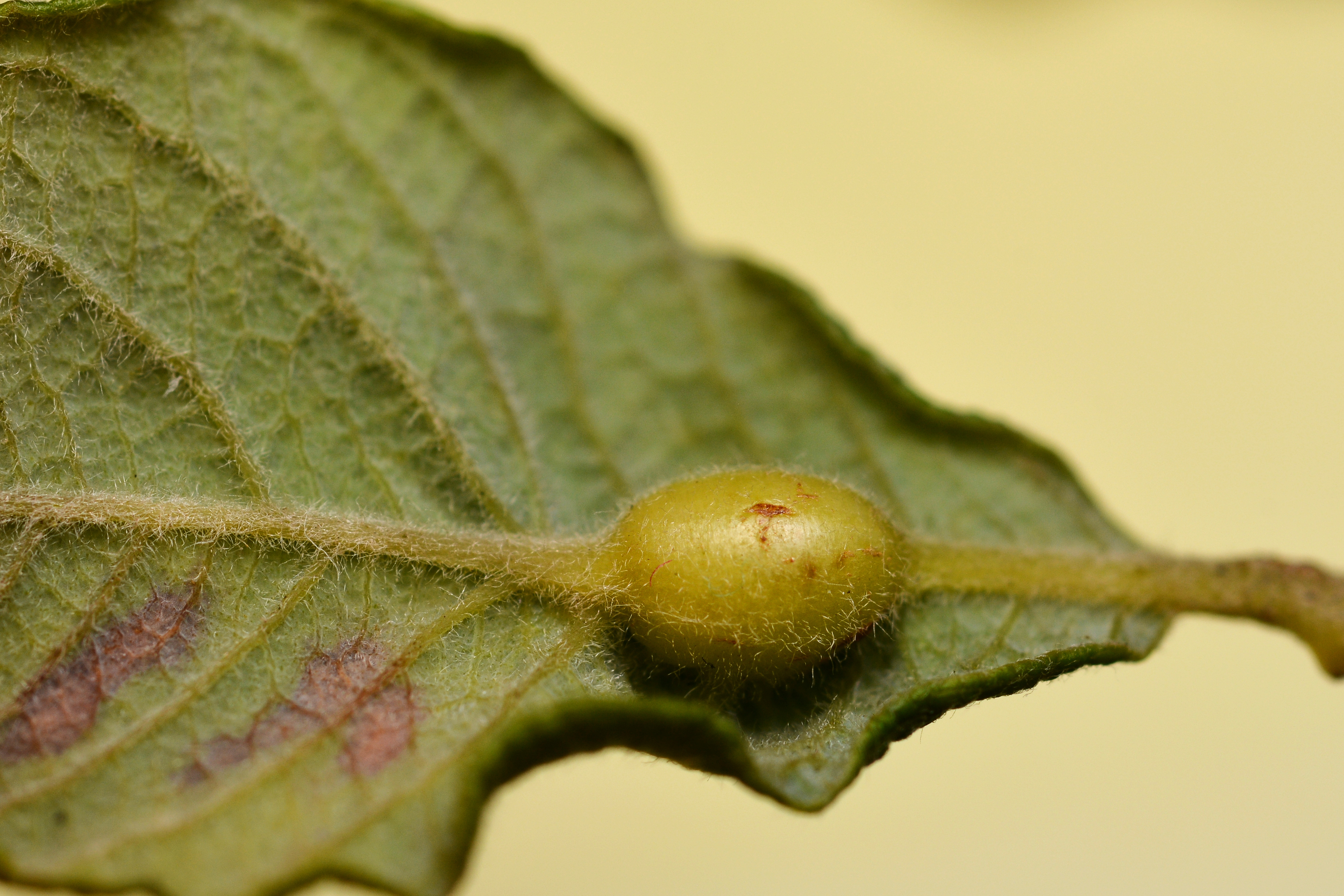

Scientific classification
- Kingdom: Animalia
- Phylum: Arthropoda
- Clade: Pancrustacea
- Class: Insecta
- Order: Diptera
- Family: Cecidomyiidae
- Genus: Rabdophaga
- Species: R. nervorum

Binomial name
- Rabdophaga nervorum (Kieffer, 1895)

Synonyms
- Rhabdophaga nervorum (Kieffer); Dichelomyia nervorum Kieffer, 1895

= Rabdophaga nervorum =

Species of fly

Rabdophaga nervorum is a gall midge which forms galls on the leaves of sallows (Salix species). It is found in Europe and was first described by the French entomologist, Jean-Jacques Kieffer in 1895.

== Description ==
The genus Salix supports many galls, some of which are difficult to identify, particularly those caused by the gall midges in the genus Rabdophaga.

Rabdophaga nervorum forms galls on the midrib of leaves on sallows. The gall, is an approximately 2–3 mm, spindle-shaped swelling on the underside of the midrib of a leaf. The swelling is not hard and contains a single, pale yellow larva. Pupation occurs within the gall.

The gall has been found on white willow (S. alba), S. appendiculata, eared willow (S. aurita), Babylon willow (S. babylonica), goat willow (S. caprea), grey willow (S. cinerea), olive willow (S. elaeagnos), crack willow (S. fragilis), black willow (S. nigra), bay willow (S. pentandra), tea-leaved willow (S. phylicifolia) and purple willow (S. purpurea).

== Distribution ==
Rabdophaga nervorum has been found in Finland, France, Germany and Great Britain (England, Scotland and Wales).
