= Rabdophaga jaapi =

Scientific classification
- Kingdom: Animalia
- Phylum: Arthropoda
- Class: Insecta
- Order: Diptera
- Family: Cecidomyiidae
- Genus: Rabdophaga
- Species: R. jaapi

Binomial name
- Rabdophaga jaapi Rübsaamen, 1916

Synonyms
- Dasineura repentis Skuhrava, 1986; Rabdophaga repentis

Species of fly

Rabdophaga jaapi is a species of gall midges which forms galls on creeping willow (Salix repens).

== Description ==
The gall is an enlarged bud on S. repens. It is surrounded with small thickened leaves which have short silver-white hairs. Correct identification of the species of Salix is important for the identification of R. jaapi, because it is similar to R. rosariella, which forms galls on sallows. (Note: In this case sallow refers to S. aurita, S. caprea and S. cinerea.) The gall of R. jaapi can also be positively identified by the single reddish-yellow larva which has a sternal spatula, i.e. ″... a structure on the underside of the thorax of the final (third) instar larva of Cecidomyiidae...″.

The species has one generation a year (i.e. univoltine) and the larva hibernates in the gall where it pupates.

== Distribution ==
Has been found in Denmark and Great Britain.
