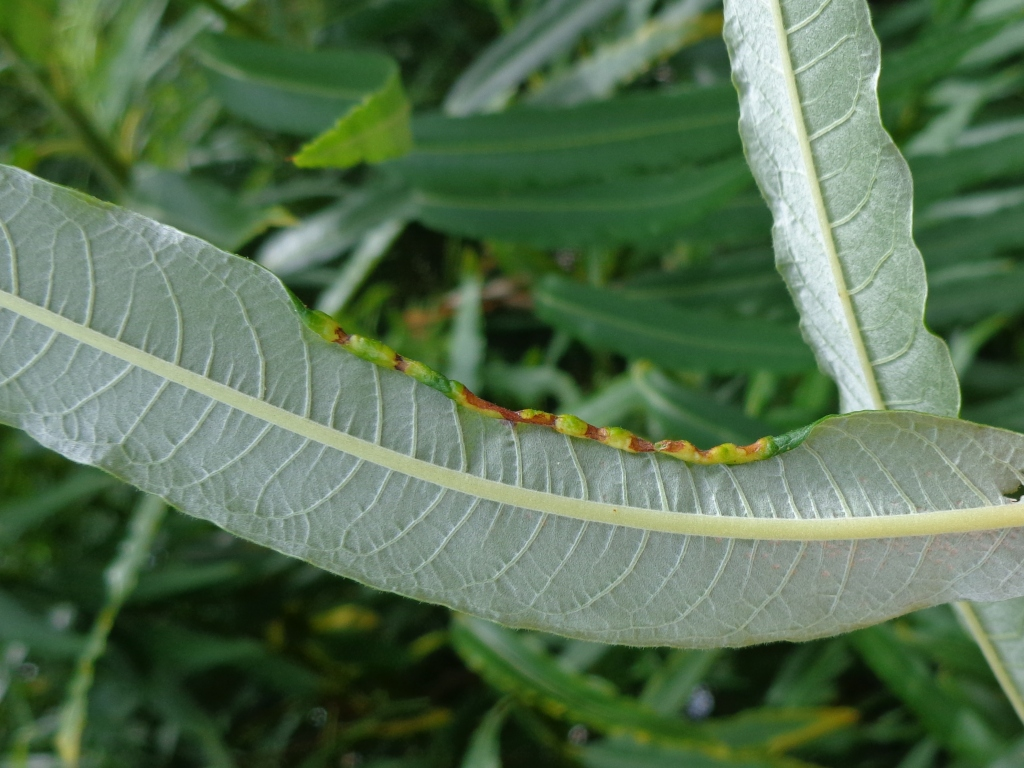

Scientific classification
- Kingdom: Animalia
- Phylum: Arthropoda
- Class: Insecta
- Order: Diptera
- Family: Cecidomyiidae
- Genus: Rabdophaga
- Species: R. marginemtorquens

Binomial name
- Rabdophaga marginemtorquens (Bremi, 1847)

Synonyms
- Dasineura marginemtorquens Perrisia, marginemtorquens

= Rabdophaga marginemtorquens =

Species of fly

Rabdophaga marginemtorquens is a gall midge which forms galls on willows (Salix species) and is found in Europe. It was described by Johann Jacob Bremi-Wolf in 1847.

== Appearance of the gall ==
The eggs are laid between the bud scales in the spring. The gall is a short or long downward, hairless, roll containing one or several yellowish-red or orange larvae. The galls are of varying lengths, often run together and often have orange, red or white patches. There are two or three generations in a year, with the summer generations pupating in the gall and the autumn generation pupating in the soil.

It is found on white willow (S. alba), goat willow (S. caprea), grey willow (S. cinerea), violet willow (S. daphnoides), olive willow (S. elaeagnos), purple willow (S. purpurea) and common osier (S. viminalis). According to Redfern et al (2011) the gall is only found on S. viminalis in Great Britain.

== Distribution ==
The insect has been found in Armenia, Germany, Great Britain, Lithuania, the Netherlands, and Sweden.

== Inquiline ==
Rabdophaga roskami (Stelter, 1989) is probably an inquiline of R. marginemtorquens.
