= Rabdophaga karschi =

Scientific classification
- Kingdom: Animalia
- Phylum: Arthropoda
- Clade: Pancrustacea
- Class: Insecta
- Order: Diptera
- Family: Cecidomyiidae
- Genus: Rabdophaga
- Species: R. karschi

Binomial name
- Rabdophaga karschi (Kieffer, 1891)

Synonyms
- Rhabdophaga karschi (Kieffer); Rhabdophaga oculiperda Rübsaamen, 1921; Rabdophaga oculiperda (Rübsaamen, 1921); Cecidomyia karschi Kieffer, 1891

Species of fly

Rabdophaga karschi is a gall midge which forms galls on the twigs of sallows (Salix species).

== Description ==
The genus Salix supports many galls, some of which are difficult to identify, particularly those caused by the gall midges in the genus Rabdophaga. R. karschi forms galls on the twigs of sallows. (Note: In this case sallow refers to S. aurita, S. caprea, S. cinerea and their hybrids.) The gall is an approximately 3 mm wide, slender, spindle-shaped swelling of a twig. There is one red larva or a pupa and the larva makes an exit hole in the galled stem or occasionally in a bud.

== Distribution ==
The gall has been found in the Czech Republic, Great Britain and the Netherlands.
