= Rabdophaga iteobia =

Scientific classification
- Kingdom: Animalia
- Phylum: Arthropoda
- Class: Insecta
- Order: Diptera
- Family: Cecidomyiidae
- Genus: Rabdophaga
- Species: R. iteobia

Binomial name
- Rabdophaga iteobia (Kieffer, 1890)

Synonyms
- Dasineura iteobia

Species of fly

Rabdophaga iteobia is a gall midge which forms galls on the buds of willow species.

== Description ==
The gall is an elongated rosette or artichoke, with a diameter up to 15 mm; the leaves may be hairy. There is one generation a year, the larvae are orange and pupate in the ground.

The gall has been found on the following species:

- Salix aurita – eared willow
- Salix caprea – goat willow
- Salix cinerea – grey willow
- Salix glauca – glaucous willow
- Salix repens – creeping willow

== Distribution ==
Found in the following European countries: Belgium and the United Kingdom.
