= Coleophora zelleriella =

Scientific classification
- Kingdom: Animalia
- Phylum: Arthropoda
- Clade: Pancrustacea
- Class: Insecta
- Order: Lepidoptera
- Family: Coleophoridae
- Genus: Coleophora
- Species: C. zelleriella

Binomial name
- Coleophora zelleriella Heinemann, 1854

Species of moth

Coleophora zelleriella is a moth of the family Coleophoridae. It is found from Sweden to the Mediterranean Sea and from France to southern Russia. It is not known from the Mediterranean islands.

The larvae feed on Salix aurita, Salix caprea and Salix cinerea. Larvae can be found from autumn to June.
