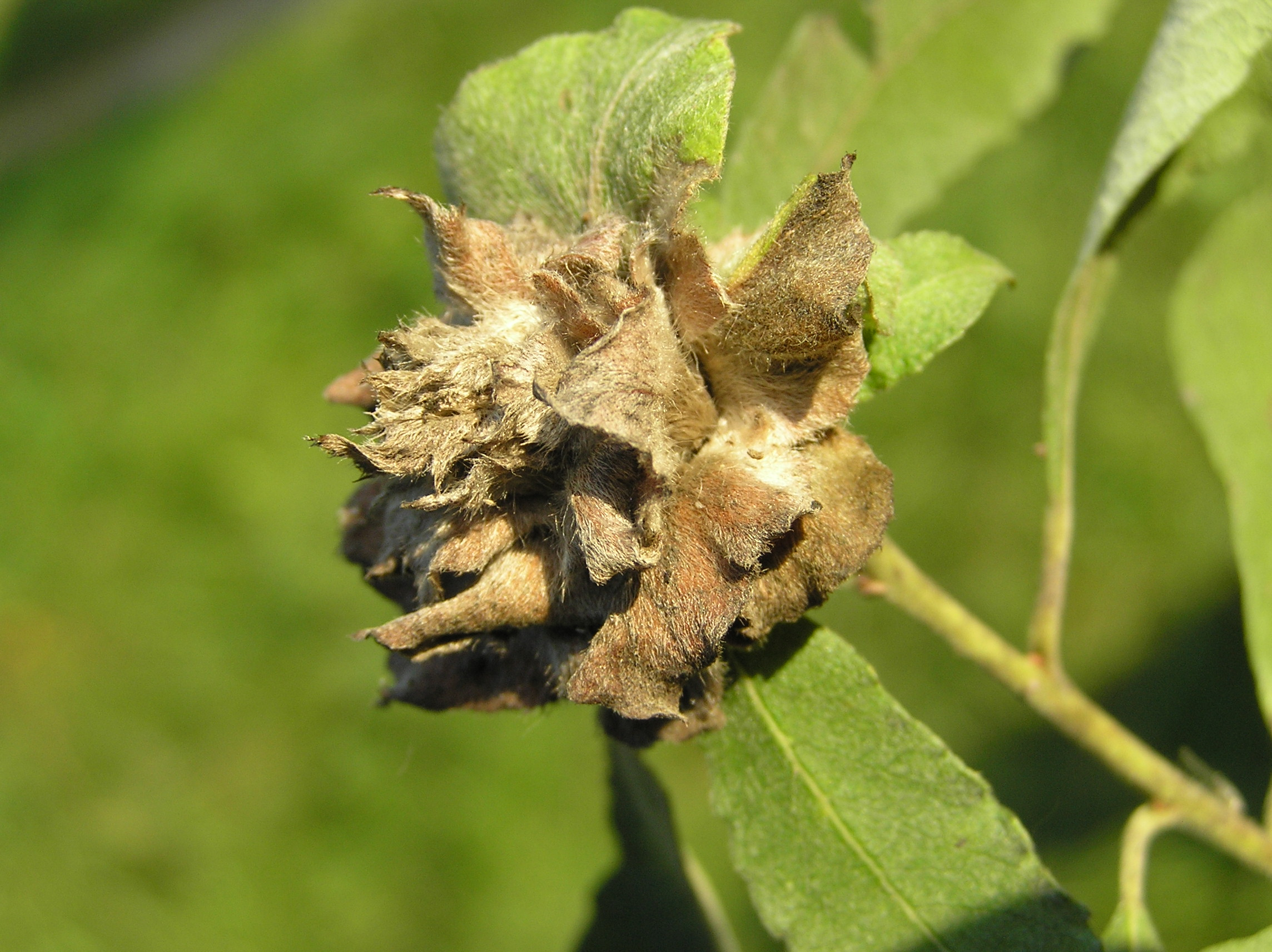
- Stem gall caused by Rhabdophaga rosaria

Scientific classification
- Kingdom: Animalia
- Phylum: Arthropoda
- Class: Insecta
- Order: Diptera
- Family: Cecidomyiidae
- Genus: Rabdophaga
- Species: R. rosaria

Binomial name
- Rabdophaga rosaria (H. Loew, 1850)

Synonyms
- Cecidomyia rosaria; Cecidomyia cinerearum

= Rabdophaga rosaria =

Species of fly

Rabdophaga rosaria is a gall midge which forms Camellia galls or terminal rosette gall on willow species. It was first described by Hermann Loew in 1850.

== Description ==
Willows are extremely susceptible to gall induction and growth manipulation and Salix is one of the plant genera with the highest known numbers of associated galler species.

Rabdophaga rosaria is probably a group of closely related, unnamed species, possibly each restricted to one species of willow. Galls should be recorded as R rosaria and the host plant should also be recorded.

The gall consists of from thirty to sixty leaves, shortened and crowded together in rosettes on white willow (S. alba), crack willow (S. fragilis), goat willow (S. caprea) and purple willow (S. purpurea) willows as well as the eared sallow (S. aurita) and grey sallow (S. cinerea). The oviposition of this species results in a chemical interaction that halts the lengthwise growth of infected willow shoots, the leaves however continue to develop and thus the characteristic "rose" forms at the tip of the affected shoot.

=== Characteristics ===
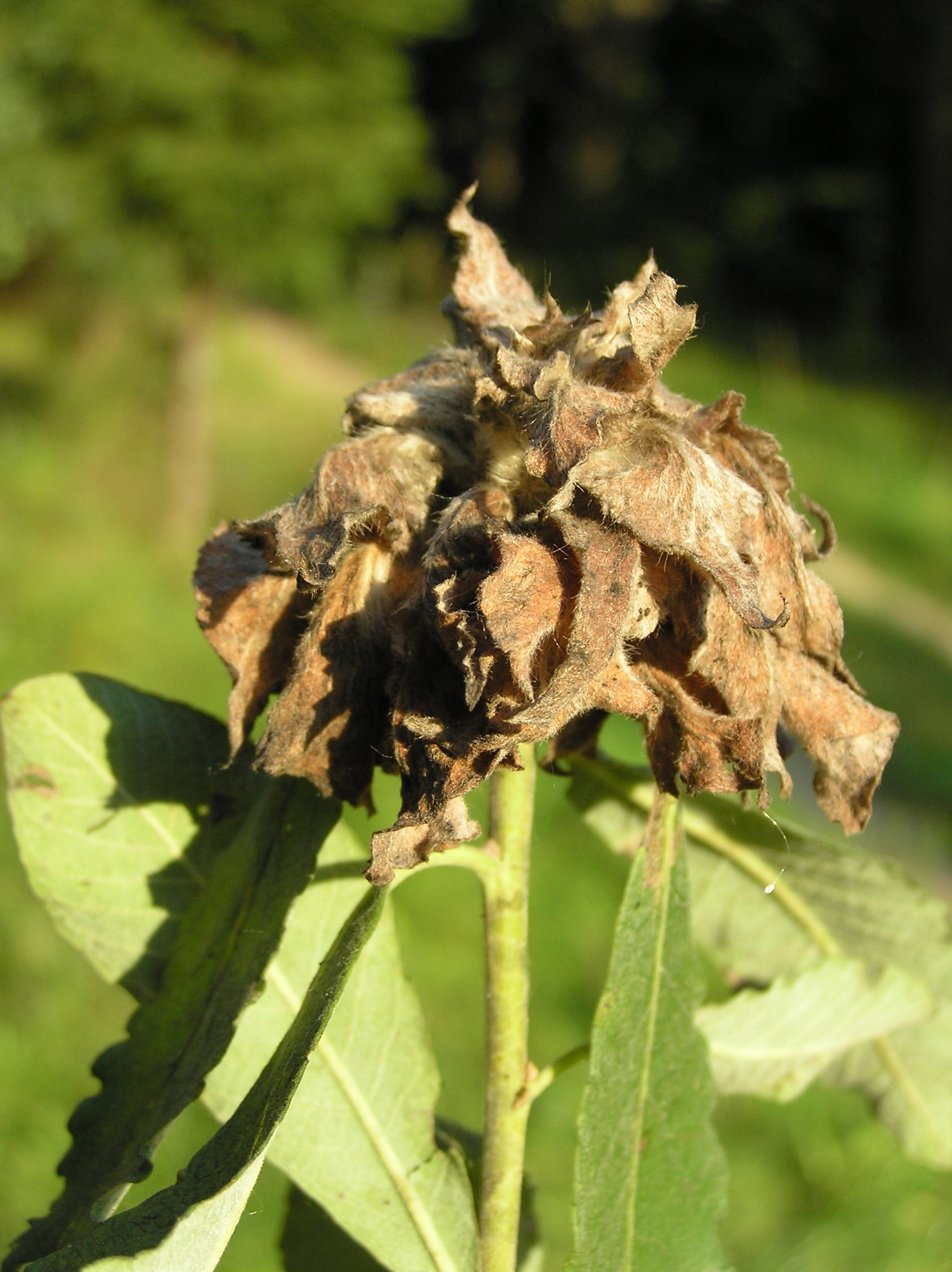
Camellia gall on willow

Rabdophaga rosaria is found on willow branches and the gall diameter depends upon the species, being larger on Salix caprea at 8 centimetres (3.1 in) than on Salix alba at 3 cm (1.2 in). The development in the United Kingdom begins in May / June with leaf expansion and reaches maturity in August / September while the leaves are still green. The gall becomes brown and remains on the tree over winter until it is forced off by new growth in spring.

== Causer, inquiline and associations ==
Each rosette contains a single pinkish-coloured larva which, unusually, pupates within the gall. Rabdophaga strobilina is closely related and is an inquiline of R. rosaria. One or more larva live under the modified leaves of the rosette and depending on the number of strobilina they can change the shape of the gall from a rosette to a 30–40 mm long cone-shaped artichoke. A common inquiline is another gall midge, Perrisia iteophila and the gall mite Eriophyes marginatus often appears on Camellia galls.

== Phylogeny ==
A 2020 study which analysed the COI gene of mitochondrial DNA extracted from Rabdophaga larvae that induce rosette galls on Salix in the Holarctic Region showed that R. rosaria could be divided into 2 clades, 1 and 2, and the latter further divided into subclades 2A and 2B. Clade 1 consists of populations on Salix species of section Cinerella in subgenus Vetrix in Georgia and the UK, subclade 2A contains populations on Salix alba (section Salix, subgenus Salix) in The Netherlands and the UK, and subclade 2B consists of populations on section Helix in Poland, Phylicifoliae in Alaska, and Salix species in the Eastern Palaearctic Region.

== Distribution ==
Rabdophaga rosaria is widely distributed throughout the United Kingdom and is locally common. It is abundant in Finland.

== Sources ==
- Darlington, Arnold (1975) The Pocket Encyclopaedia of Plant Galls in Colour. Pub. Blandford Press. Poole. ISBN 0-7137-0748-8.
- Stubbs, F. B. Edit. (1986) Provisional Keys to British Plant Galls. Pub. Brit Plant Gall Soc. ISBN 0-9511582-0-1.
