= Rabdophaga purpureaperda =

Scientific classification
- Kingdom: Animalia
- Phylum: Arthropoda
- Class: Insecta
- Order: Diptera
- Family: Cecidomyiidae
- Genus: Rabdophaga
- Species: R. purpureaperda

Binomial name
- Rabdophaga purpureaperda (Barnes, 1935)

Synonyms
- Dasineura purpureaperda Rhabdophaga purpureaperda Barnes, 1935

Species of fly

Rabdophaga purpureaperda is a gall midge. The larvae tunnel in the shoots of purple willow (Salix purpurea) and may cause the shoots to swell slightly. It was first described by Horace Francis Barnes in 1935.

== Description ==
The orange or red larvae live under the bark of shoots in individual elongated cells. Before the larvae pupate they make emergence holes which, along with discolouration of the bark, may be the only indication of their presence.

Larvae of R. justini have also been found living in tunnels within purple willow (S. purpurea) shoots, but are not considered to form galls.
