= Dasineura auritae =

Scientific classification
- Kingdom: Animalia
- Phylum: Arthropoda
- Class: Insecta
- Order: Diptera
- Family: Cecidomyiidae
- Genus: Dasineura
- Species: D. auritae

Binomial name
- Dasineura auritae Rübsaamen, 1916

Synonyms
- Rabdophaga auritae

Species of fly

Dasineura auritae is a gall midge which forms galls on the leaves of sallows (Salix species) and their hybrids. It was first described by Ewald Heinrich Rübsaamen in 1916.

== Appearance of the gall ==
The gall is a short downward, hairless, roll containing one yellowish red larva, or if several rolls run together, several larvae. There are two generations per year; the summer generation pupate in the gall and the winter generation on the ground. It is found on eared willow (S. aurita), goat willow (S. caprea), grey willow (S. cinerea) (as well as their hybrids) and Alpine grey willow (S. glaucosericea).

== Distribution ==
The insect has been found in Austria, Belgium, Denmark, Germany, Great Britain, the Netherlands, Norway, Poland, Sweden and Switzerland.
