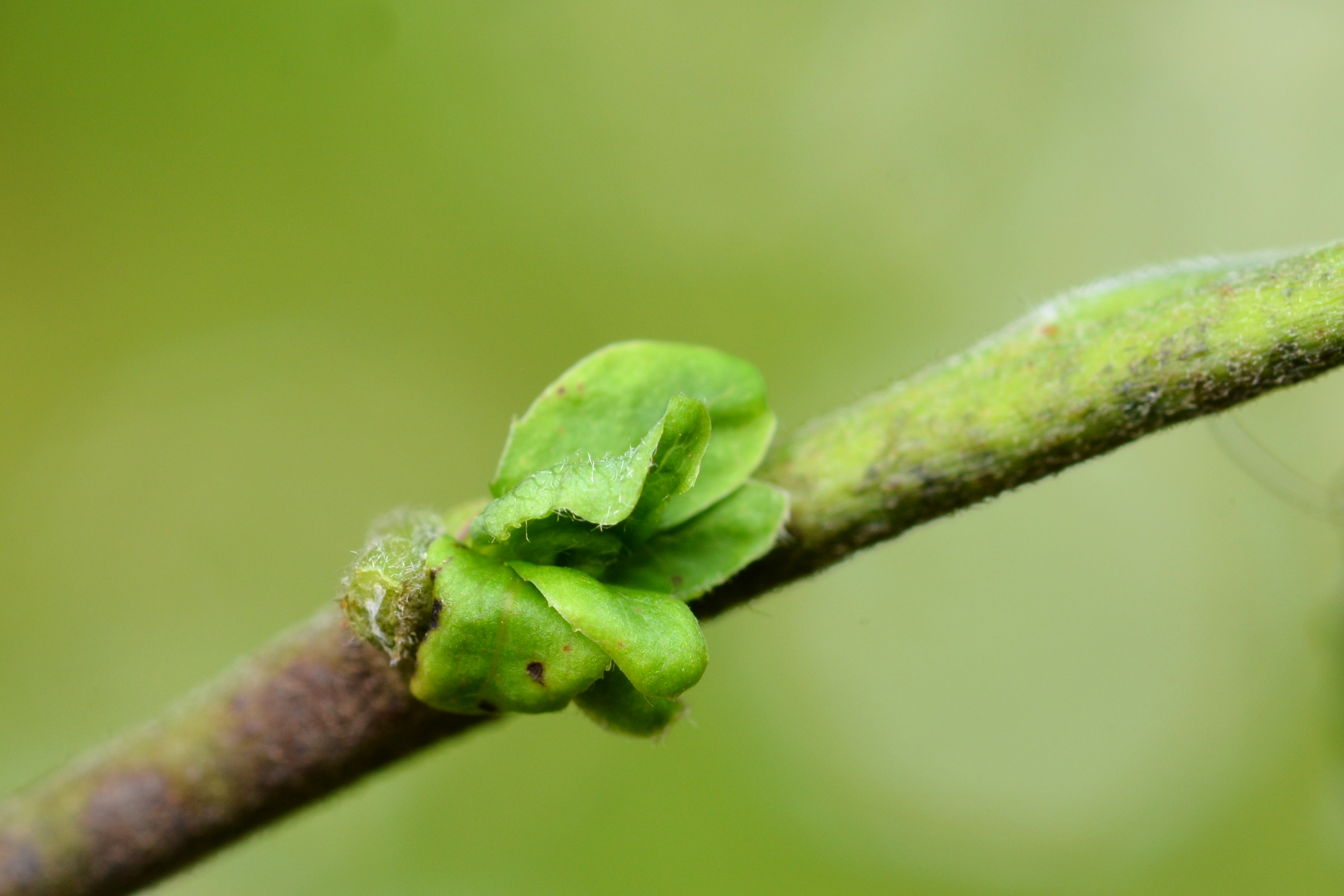

Scientific classification
- Kingdom: Animalia
- Phylum: Arthropoda
- Clade: Pancrustacea
- Class: Insecta
- Order: Diptera
- Family: Cecidomyiidae
- Genus: Rabdophaga
- Species: R. rosariella

Binomial name
- Rabdophaga rosariella (Kieffer, 1897)

= Rabdophaga rosariella =

Species of fly

Rabdophaga rosariella is a species of gall midge which forms galls on sallows (Salix species). It was first described by Jean-Jacques Kieffer in 1897.

== Description ==
The gall is a small rosette, most often in an axillary bud on sallows. In Britain sallow usually refers to S. aurita, S caprea, S. cinerea and the hybrids between these species. The rosette leaves are not obviously hairy and the fully grown larva does not have a sternal spatula (i.e. a structure on the underside of the thorax of the final (third) instar larva of Cecidomyiidae). Larvae of R. rosariella are unique as all other known Rabdophaga larvae have a sternal spatula.

== Distribution ==
Recorded from Belgium and Great Britain.
