= Rabdophaga heterobia =

Scientific classification
- Kingdom: Animalia
- Phylum: Arthropoda
- Class: Insecta
- Order: Diptera
- Family: Cecidomyiidae
- Genus: Rabdophaga
- Species: R. heterobia

Binomial name
- Rabdophaga heterobia (Loew, 1850)

Synonyms Dasineura heterobia
- Cecidomyia heterobia Loew, 1850; Rhabdophaga heterobia (Low, F.)

Species of fly

Rabdophaga heterobia is a species of gall midges which has two generations a year and forms galls on almond willow (Salix triandra). It was first described by Hermann Loew in 1850.

== Description ==
There are two generations a year; larvae of the spring generation gall catkins while the summer generation is a swollen bud which partly opens and the larvae live amongst the tiny leaves.

Spring generation

A distinct, downy, ovoid swelling at the tip or base of a male catkin. The scales and stamen are thickened and contain several light red larvae which pupate in the gall. According to Redfern et al. (2011) S. heterobia galls male catkins (also recorded in Belgium) while in Hungary the gall has been recorded on female catkins which show disfigured yellow, swollen, hairy, fruitlets.

Summer generation

The gall is an enlarged bud which partly opens into a hairy rosette, and the orange-red larvae feed amongst the tiny leaves. Pupation takes place in the soil.

The gall has been reported on mountain willow (Salix arbuscula) and purple willow (Salix purpurea) which is probably incorrect.

== Distribution ==
Belgium, Hungary and the United Kingdom where it is common.

== Inquilines ==
Lestodiplosis heterobiae is an inquiline of R. heterobia.
