= Rabdophaga triandraperda =

Scientific classification
- Kingdom: Animalia
- Phylum: Arthropoda
- Class: Insecta
- Order: Diptera
- Family: Cecidomyiidae
- Genus: Rabdophaga
- Species: R. triandraperda

Binomial name
- Rabdophaga triandraperda (Barnes, 1935)

Synonyms
- Dasineura triandraperda

Species of fly

Rabdophaga triandraperda is a gall midge. The larvae tunnel in the shoots of almond willow (Salix triandra) and may cause the shoots to swell slightly. It was first described by Horace Francis Barnes in 1935.

== Description ==
The orange or red larvae live under the bark of shoots in individual cells. Before the larvae pupate they make emergence holes which may be the only indication of their presence.
