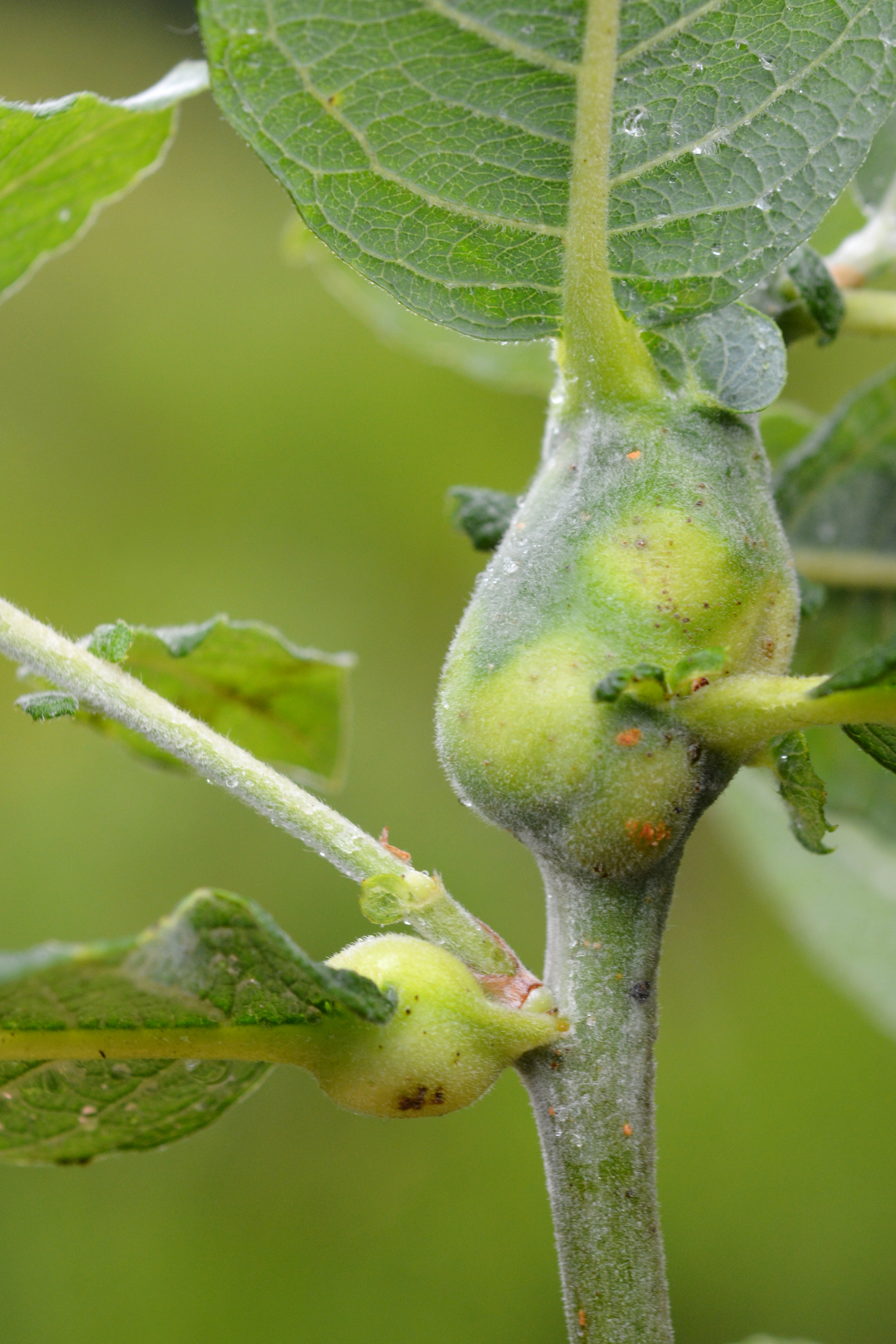
- Gall caused by Rabdophaga salicis

Scientific classification
- Domain: Eukaryota
- Kingdom: Animalia
- Phylum: Arthropoda
- Class: Insecta
- Order: Diptera
- Family: Cecidomyiidae
- Subfamily: Cecidomyiinae
- Supertribe: Lasiopteridi
- Tribe: Oligotrophini
- Genus: Rabdophaga (Westwood 1847)

Synonyms
- Rhabdophaga

= Rabdophaga =

Genus of flies

Rabdophaga is genus of flies in the family of gall midges Cecidomyiidae. There are 105 species distributed through Africa, Asia, Europe and North America. Most species of Rabdophaga gall willows (Salix sp.); one exception is R. giraudiana which galls the stems of poplars (Populus sp.).

== Species ==
- Rabdophaga absobrina (Felt, 1907)
- Rabdophaga albipennis (Loew, 1850)
- Rabdophaga auritae
- Rabdophaga californica (Felt, 1908)
- Rabdophaga caulicola (Felt, 1909)
- Rabdophaga cephalanthi (Felt, 1908)
- Rabdophaga cinerearum
- Rabdophaga clausilia (Bremi, 1847)
- Rabdophaga clavifex (Kieffer 1891)
- Rabdophaga consobrina (Felt, 1907)
- Rabdophaga degeerii (Bremi, 1847)
- Rabdophaga deletrix (Rübsaamen, 1916)
- Rabdophaga dubiosa (Kieffer, 1913)
- Rabdophaga essigi (Felt, 1926)
- Rabdophaga exsiccans (Rübsaamen, 1916)
- Rabdophaga frater (Cockerell, 1890)
- Rabdophaga gemmae (Felt, 1908)
- Rabdophaga gemmicola (Kieffer, 1896)
- Rabdophaga gemmicolata
- Rabdophaga giraudiana (Kieffer, 1898)
- Rabdophaga globosa (Felt, 1908)
- Rabdophaga heterobia (Loew 1850)
- Rabdophaga hildebrandi (Felt, 1928)
- Rabdophaga insignis (Kieffer, 1906)
- Rabdophaga iteobia (Kieffer, 1890)
- Rabdophaga iteophila (Loew 1850)
- Rabdophaga jaapi (Rübsaamen, 1916)
- Rabdophaga justini (Barnes, 1935)
- Rabdophaga karschi (Kieffer, 1891)
- Rabdophaga latebrosa (Felt, 1909)
- Rabdophaga latipennis (Felt, 1908)
- Rabdophaga lattkei (Stelter 1994)
- Rabdophaga lindhardti (Stelter 1989)
- Rabdophaga marginemtorquens (Bremi, 1847)
- Rabdophaga nervorum (Kieffer, 1895)
- Rabdophaga nielsenii (Kieffer, 1906)
- Rabdophaga normaniana (Felt, 1908)
- Rabdophaga occidentalis (Felt, 1908)
- Rabdophaga occidua (Gagne, 1989)
- Rabdophaga oculiperda
- Rabdophaga oleiperda (Guercio, 1918)
- Rabdophaga palliumparens (Stelter, 1977)
- Rabdophaga perocculta (Cockerell, 1904)
- Rabdophaga persimilis (Felt, 1908)
- Rabdophaga pierreana (Kieffer, 1909)
- Rabdophaga pierrei (Kieffer, 1896)
- Rabdophaga podagrae (Felt, 1908)
- Rabdophaga populi (Felt, 1907)
- Rabdophaga porrecta (Felt, 1915)
- Rabdophaga pulvini (Kieffer, 1891)
- Rabdophaga purpureaperda (Barnes, 1935)
- Rabdophaga ramuscula (Felt, 1908)
- Rabdophaga repenticornua (Bland, 2001)
- Rabdophaga repentiperda (Stelter, 1982)
- Rabdophaga repentis
- Rabdophaga rigidae (Osten Sacken, 1862)
- Rabdophaga rosacea (Felt, 1908)
- Rabdophaga rosaeformis (Kovalev, 1967)
- Rabdophaga rosaria (Loew, 1850)
- Rabdophaga rosariella (Kieffer, 1897)
- Rabdophaga roskami (Stelter, 1989)
- Rabdophaga salicifoliae (Shinji, 1942)
- Rabdophaga saliciperda (Dufour, 1841)
- Rabdophaga salicis (Schrank, 1803)
- Rabdophaga salicisbatatus (Osten Sacken, 1878)
- Rabdophaga salicisbrassicoides (Packard, 1869)
- Rabdophaga saliciscornu (Osten Sacken, 1878)
- Rabdophaga salsolata Gagne, 2004
- Rabdophaga santolinae (Tavares, 1902)
- Rabdophaga schicki (Stelter, 1982)
- Rabdophaga schreiteri (Stelter 1982)
- Rabdophaga schwangarti (Rübsaamen, 1916)
- Rabdophaga setubalensis (Tavares, 1902)
- Rabdophaga sodalitatis (Felt, 1908)
- Rabdophaga strobilina (Bremi, 1847)
- Rabdophaga strobiloides (Osten Sacken, 1862)
- Rabdophaga terminalis (Loew 1850)
- Rabdophaga timberlakei (Felt, 1916)
- Rabdophaga triandraperda (Barnes, 1935)
- Rabdophaga tumidosae (Felt, 1908)
- Rabdophaga vigemmae (Stelter, 1989)
- Rabdophaga viminalis (Westwood, 1847)
- Rabdophaga viva (Rapp, 1946)
- Rabdophaga walshii (Felt, 1908)

== Previous species ==
- Rabdophaga ramicola Rübsaamen, 1915 is a synonym of Rabdophaga degeerii (Bremi, 1847)
