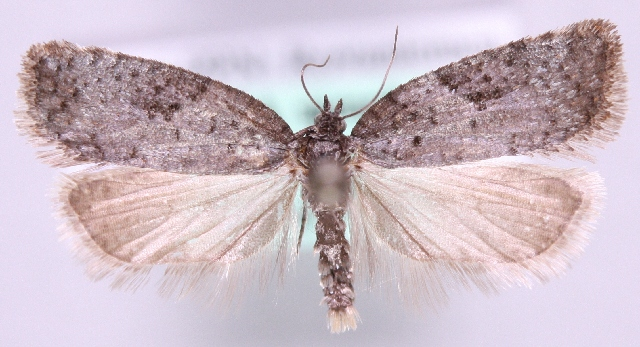

Scientific classification
- Kingdom: Animalia
- Phylum: Arthropoda
- Class: Insecta
- Order: Lepidoptera
- Family: Tortricidae
- Genus: Acleris
- Species: A. implexana

Binomial name
- Acleris implexana (Walker, 1863)

Synonyms
- Sciaphila implexana Walker, 1863; Acalla ferrumixtana Benander, 1934; Acleris ferrumixtana; Peronea gallicolana Clemens, 1864; Peronea heindelana Fernald, in Heindel, 1905; Peronea heindeliana Forbes, 1923

= Acleris implexana =

Species of moth

Acleris implexana is a species of moth of the family Tortricidae. It is found in Norway, Sweden, Finland, Russia and North America, where it has been recorded from Quebec to British Columbia and adjacent areas of the United States.

The wingspan is 13–14 mm. Adults are on wing from late August to October.

The larvae feed on the leaves of Pinus and Salix species. They have also been recorded feeding in the pine cone willow gall, caused by the gall midge Rabdophaga strobiloides.

== Subspecies ==
- Acleris implexana implexana (North America)
- Acleris implexana ferrumixtana (Benander, 1934) (Europe)
