= Rabdophaga justini =

Scientific classification
- Kingdom: Animalia
- Phylum: Arthropoda
- Class: Insecta
- Order: Diptera
- Family: Cecidomyiidae
- Genus: Rabdophaga
- Species: R. justini

Binomial name
- Rabdophaga justini (Barnes, 1935)

Synonyms
- Dasineura justini

Species of fly

Rabdophaga justini is a gall midge. It was first described by Horace Francis Barnes in 1935. The larvae tunnel in the shoots of purple willow (Salix purpurea).

== Description ==
The larvae live in separate chambers under the bark of shoots of purple willow (Salix purpurea). Before the larvae pupate they make emergence holes which, along with some discolouration of the bark on top of the shoot, may be the only indication of their presence. The larval chamber may sometimes be found in the midrib of a leaf.

Redfern et al. (2011) no longer consider R. justini to be a gall causer.
