= Rabdophaga nielsenii =

Scientific classification
- Kingdom: Animalia
- Phylum: Arthropoda
- Class: Insecta
- Order: Diptera
- Family: Cecidomyiidae
- Genus: Rabdophaga
- Species: R. nielsenii

Binomial name
- Rabdophaga nielsenii (Kieffer, 1906)

Synonyms
- Dasineura nielsenii Rhabdophaga nielseni Kieffer & Nielsen, 1906

Species of fly

Rabdophaga nielsenii is a gall midge. It was first described by Jean-Jacques Kieffer in 1906. The larvae tunnel in the shoots of bay willow (Salix pentandra) and may cause the shoots to swell slightly.

== Description ==
The orange or red larvae live under the bark of shoots of bay willow (Salix pentandra). Before the larvae pupate they make emergence holes which may be the only indication of their presence.
