= Rabdophaga exsiccans =

Scientific classification
- Kingdom: Animalia
- Phylum: Arthropoda
- Class: Insecta
- Order: Diptera
- Family: Cecidomyiidae
- Genus: Rabdophaga
- Species: R. exsiccans

Binomial name
- Rabdophaga exsiccans (Rübsaamen, 1916)

Synonyms
- Dasineura exsiccans

Species of fly

Rabdophaga exsiccans is a gall midge. It was first described by Ewald Heinrich Rübsaamen in 1916. The larvae tunnel in the shoots of creeping willow (Salix repens) and may cause the shoots to swell slightly.

== Description ==
The orange or red larvae live under the bark of shoots. Before the larvae pupate they make emergence holes which may be the only indication of their presence. Shoots with larvae die off.
