= Rabdophaga clavifex =

Scientific classification
- Kingdom: Animalia
- Phylum: Arthropoda
- Class: Insecta
- Order: Diptera
- Family: Cecidomyiidae
- Genus: Rabdophaga
- Species: R. clavifex

Binomial name
- Rabdophaga clavifex (Kieffer, 1891)

Synonyms
- Bertieria rosariella Cecidomyia clavifex Dasineura davifex Rhabdophaga repenticola

Species of fly

Rabdophaga clavifex is a gall midge which forms galls on the buds of willow species.

== Description ==
The tree/shrub genus Salix supports many galls, some of which are difficult to identify, particularly those caused by the gall midges in the genus Rabdophaga. R. clavifex causes a cluster of hairy buds with a club-like swelling at the tip of the shoot on sallows. Each bud contains a red or orange larva.

== Distribution ==
This species has been recorded in several European countries, including Bulgaria, the Czech Republic, Denmark, Germany, Italy, the Netherlands, Sweden, and the United Kingdom. In the UK R. clavifex has been found in Merseyside and Yorkshire.
