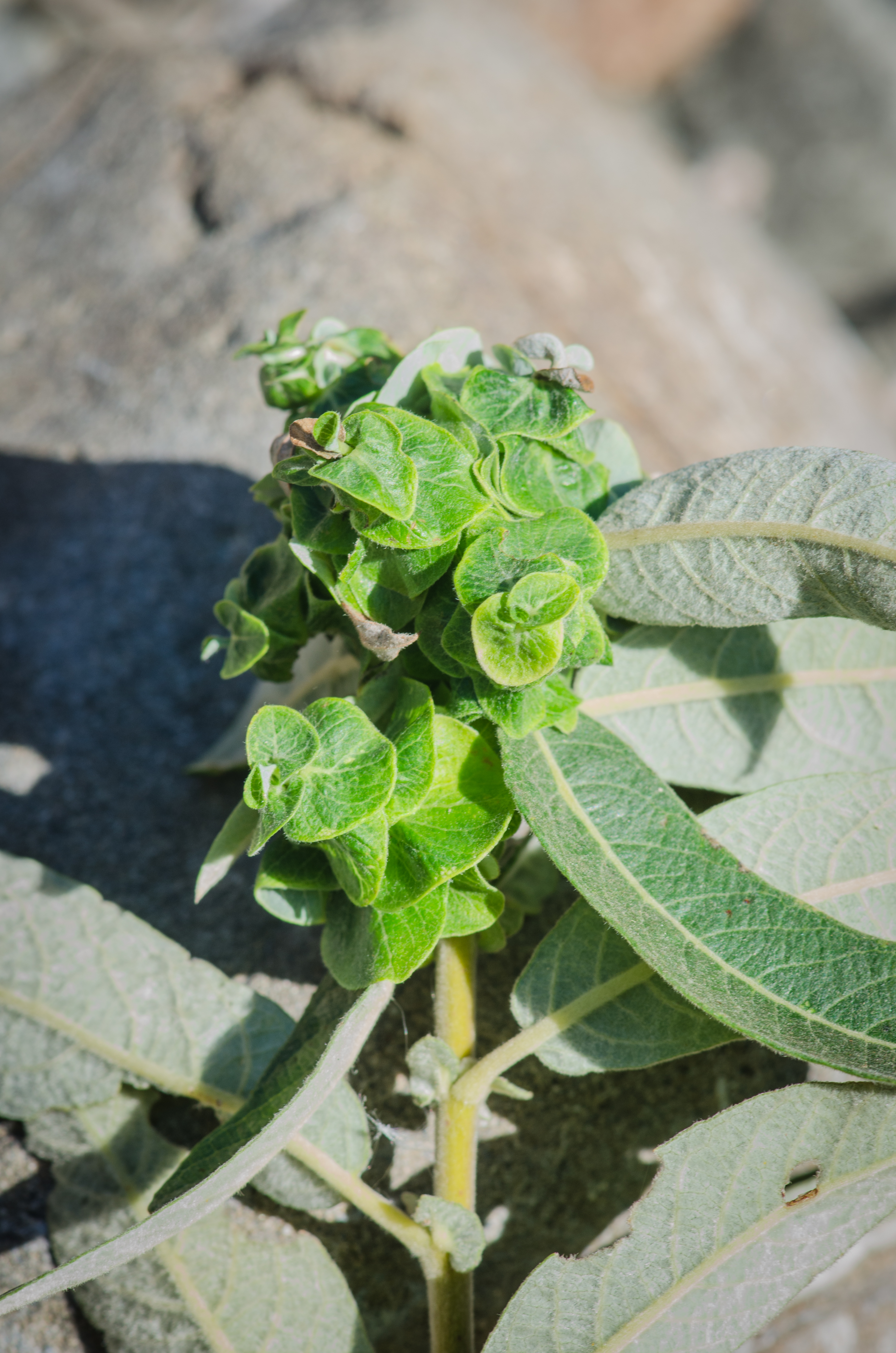
- Willow Cabbage Gall Midge (Rabdophaga salicisbrassicoides) Boonville, CA

Scientific classification
- Domain: Eukaryota
- Kingdom: Animalia
- Phylum: Arthropoda
- Class: Insecta
- Order: Diptera
- Family: Cecidomyiidae
- Genus: Rabdophaga
- Species: R. salicisbrassicoides

Binomial name
- Rabdophaga salicisbrassicoides (Packard, 1869)

Synonyms
- Cecidomyia brassicoides Beutenmuller, 1892; Cecidomyia salicisbrassicoides Packard, 1869

= Rabdophaga salicisbrassicoides =

Species of fly

Rabdophaga salicisbrassicoides, known generally as the willow rosette gall midge or willow cabbage gall midge, is a species of gall midges in the family Cecidomyiidae. Their galls and larvae thrive in association with the mutualistic relationship between Formica neoclara and Chaitophorus aphids found on their host species Salix exigua. The larva overwinter in their galls, and adults emerge in late April.
