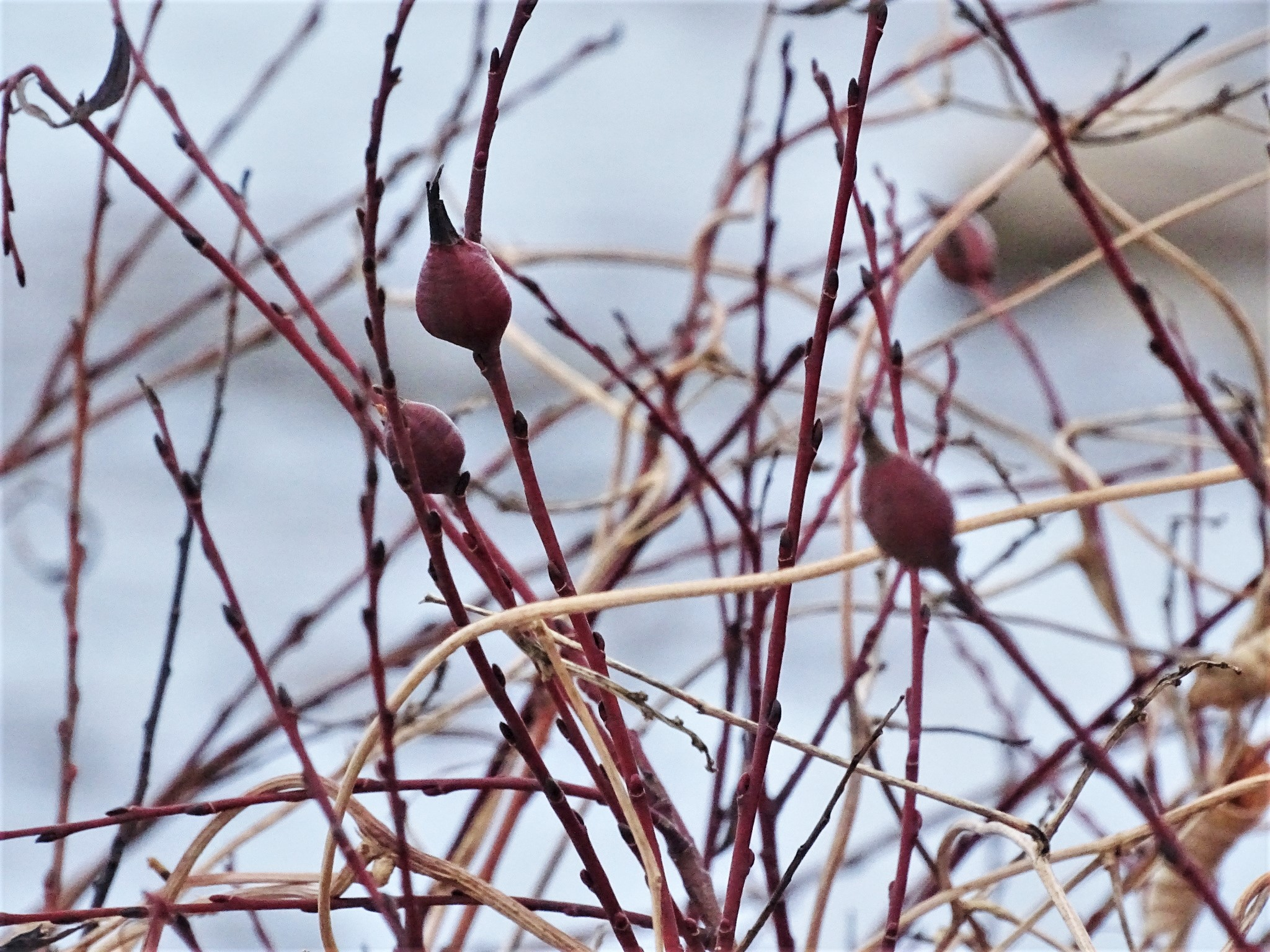
- Stem galls on Salix sp.

Scientific classification
- Domain: Eukaryota
- Kingdom: Animalia
- Phylum: Arthropoda
- Class: Insecta
- Order: Diptera
- Family: Cecidomyiidae
- Genus: Rabdophaga
- Species: R. rigidae

Binomial name
- Rabdophaga rigidae (Osten Sacken, 1862)

Synonyms
- Cecidomyia rigidae Osten Sacken, 1862; Cecidomyia salicis Fitch, 1845; Cecidomyia siliqua Osten Sacken, 1878

= Rabdophaga rigidae =

Species of fly

Rabdophaga rigidae, the willow beaked-gall midge, is a species of gall midge in the family Cecidomyiidae. It is found across North America. Some sources state that it is also present in parts of eastern Asia including Japan; however, a 2006 study shows that the Asian populations likely represent a separate species: Rabdophaga salicivora.

== Life history ==
The larvae of this midge form galls as they develop in the terminal buds of willows. They overwinter in these galls and emerge in the spring as adults.

In studies performed on Salix eriocarpa, it was found that plants colonized by the willow beaked-gall midge are stimulated to produce greater numbers of lateral shoots. This younger secondary growth in turn leads to increased herbivory by aphids such as Aphis farinosa and leaf beetles such as Plagiodera versicolora and Smaragdina semiaurantiaca.
