= Rabdophaga degeerii =

Scientific classification
- Kingdom: Animalia
- Phylum: Arthropoda
- Class: Insecta
- Order: Diptera
- Family: Cecidomyiidae
- Genus: Rabdophaga
- Species: R. degeerii

Binomial name
- Rabdophaga degeerii (Bremi, 1847)

Synonyms
- Dasineura degeerii Rabdophaga ramicola Rübsaamen, 1915

Species of fly

Rabdophaga degeerii is a gall midge which forms galls on the shoots of willows (Salix sp).

== Description ==
The gall can be a smooth, globular or a spindle-shaped swelling on a shoot. The gall chamber is in the pith and contains pale orange larvae or pupae in separate chambers. Correct identification of the host species is important, as the gall of R. degeerii is similar to R. salicis. In Britain the gall on purple willow (Salix purpurea) is recorded as R. degeerii. Elsewhere the gall has been found on S. daphnoides and S. elaeagnos.

== Distribution ==
The insect or gall has been found in Denmark, France and Great Britain.
