= Rabdophaga repenticornua =

Scientific classification
- Kingdom: Animalia
- Phylum: Arthropoda
- Class: Insecta
- Order: Diptera
- Family: Cecidomyiidae
- Genus: Rabdophaga
- Species: R. repenticornua

Binomial name
- Rabdophaga repenticornua Bland, 2001

Species of fly

Rabdophaga repenticornua is a gall midge which forms galls on the buds of creeping willow (Salix repens).

== Description ==
The female fly lays an egg in the bud of Salix repens. The solitary, orange larva feeds within the bud which grows into a 13 mm long, horn-like, reddish tube which tapers to the tip. Development of the larva probably takes two years.

== Distribution ==
The gall has been found in Scotland.
