= Rabdophaga albipennis =

Scientific classification
- Kingdom: Animalia
- Phylum: Arthropoda
- Class: Insecta
- Order: Diptera
- Family: Cecidomyiidae
- Genus: Rabdophaga
- Species: R. albipennis

Binomial name
- Rabdophaga albipennis Loew, 1850

Synonyms
- Dasineura albipennis Cecidomyia albipennis Loew, 1850; Rhabdophaga albipennis (Loew, H.)

Species of fly

Rabdophaga albipennis is a gall midge which forms galls on the shoots of white willow (Salix alba).

== Description ==
The gall is a slight swelling on a twig just below a bud on white willow (Salix alba). Inside the gall is a reddish-orange larvae which later makes an emergence hole in the twig or bud and overwinters in the gall.

== Distribution ==
The insect or gall has been found in Great Britain and Italy.
