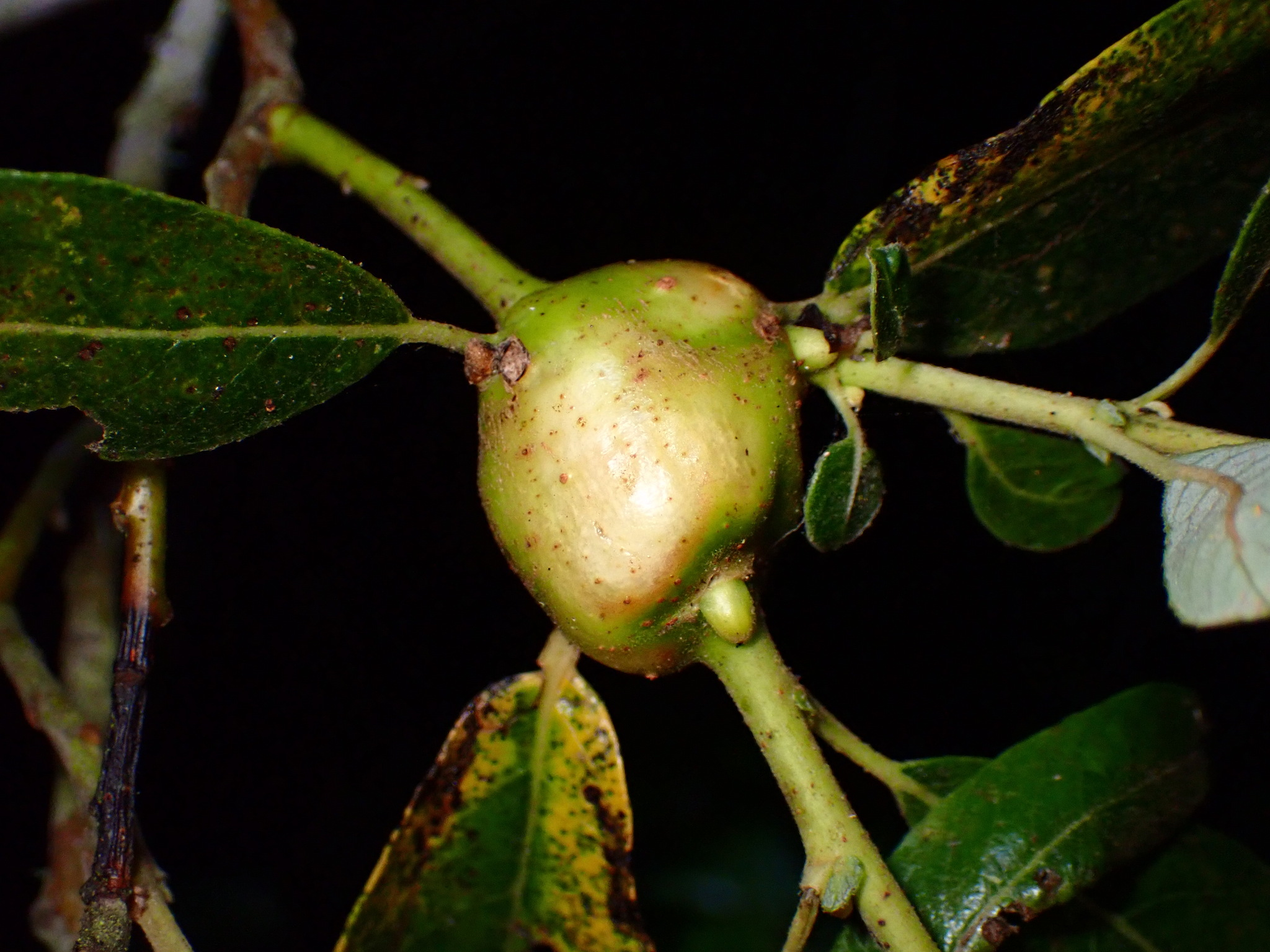

Scientific classification
- Domain: Eukaryota
- Kingdom: Animalia
- Phylum: Arthropoda
- Class: Insecta
- Order: Diptera
- Family: Cecidomyiidae
- Genus: Rabdophaga
- Species: R. salicisbatatus

Binomial name
- Rabdophaga salicisbatatus (Osten Sacken, 1878)

Synonyms
- Rabdophaga salicisbatatas

= Rabdophaga salicisbatatus =

Species of gall-inducing insect

Rabdophaga salicisbatatus, also known as the potato-gall midge or the tuber-gall midge, is a species of midge that induces stem galls on North American plants in the Willow family.
