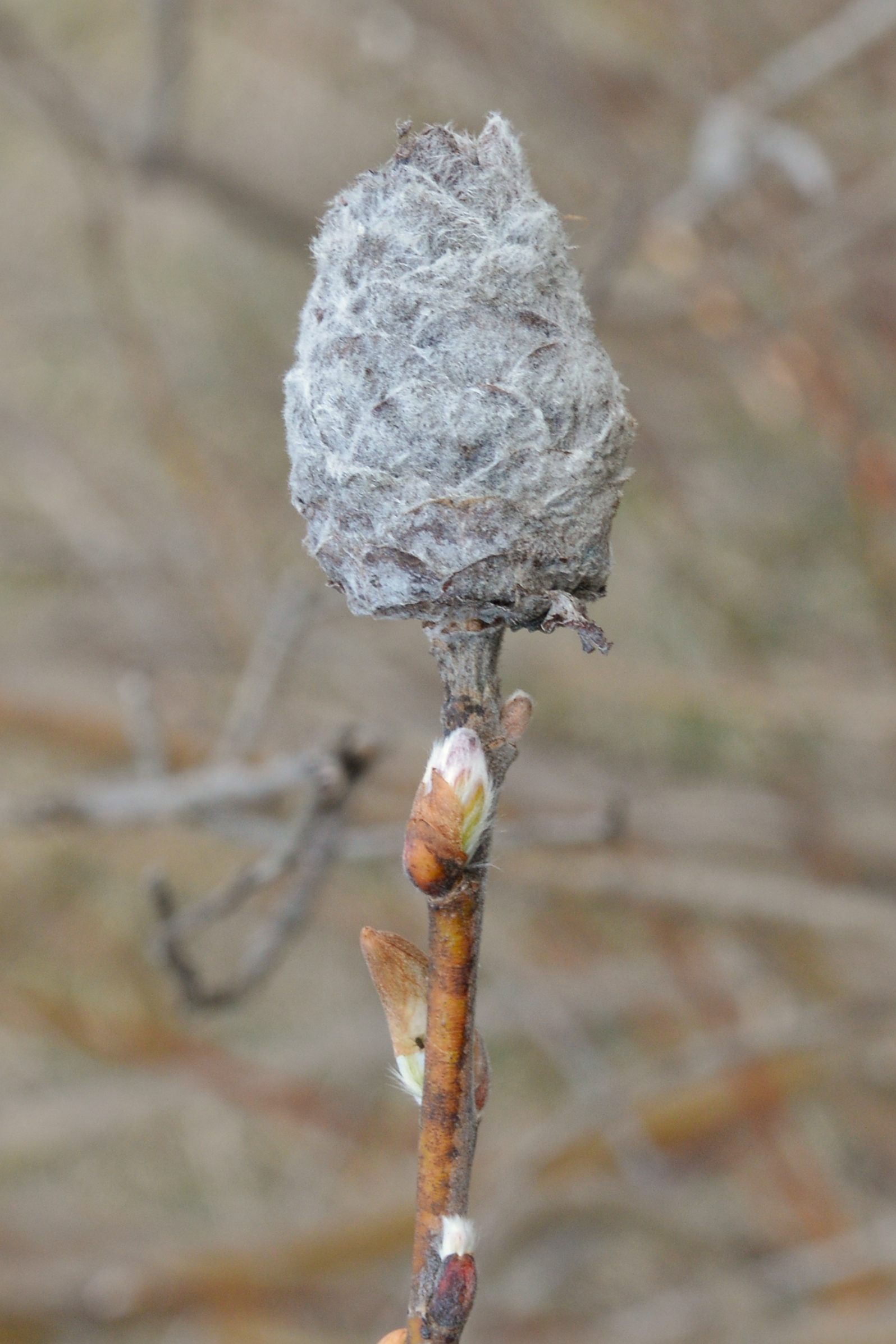
- Gall caused by willow pinecone gall midge

Scientific classification
- Kingdom: Animalia
- Phylum: Arthropoda
- Class: Insecta
- Order: Diptera
- Family: Cecidomyiidae
- Genus: Rabdophaga
- Species: R. strobiloides

Binomial name
- Rabdophaga strobiloides (Osten Sacken, 1862)

Synonyms
- Cecidomyia salicisstrobiloides Osten Sacken, 1878; Cecidomyia strobiloides Osten Sacken, 1862

= Rabdophaga strobiloides =

Willow pinecone gall midge

Species of fly

Rabdophaga strobiloides, the willow pinecone gall midge, is a species of gall midge in the family Cecidomyiidae.

The gall resembles a pinecone in shape. It can be found throughout North America.
