= Horace Francis Barnes =

British entomologist

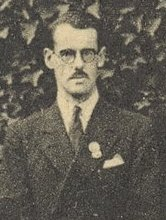
H.F. Barnes at the VI International Congress of Entomology, Madrid 1935.

Horace Francis Barnes ( 23 November 1902 - 5 February 1960) was an English entomologist who specialised in Diptera.

From 1924 to 1927 he was a Ministry of Agriculture Research Scholar at The College of St Gregory and St Martin at Wye in England and New York State Museum. From 1927 until his death he worked at Rothamsted Experimental Station.

Barnes specialised in Cecidomyiidae. He was also interested in Tipulidae.

His collection is held by the Natural History Museum, London.

== Works ==
- Barnes, H.F. 1946a. Gall midges of economic importance. Vol. I: gall midges of root and vegetable crops. Crosby Lockwood & Son Ltd., London.

partial list

- Barnes, H.F. 1946b. Gall midges of economic importance. Vol. II: gall midges of fodder crops. Crosby Lockwood & Son Ltd., London.
- Barnes, H.F. 1948a. Gall midges of economic importance. Vol. III: gall midges of fruit. Crosby Lockwood & Son Ltd., London.
- Barnes, H.F. 1948b. Gall midges of economic importance. Vol. IV: gall midges of ornamental plants and shrubs. Crosby Lockwood & Son Ltd., London.
- Barnes, H.F. 1949. Gall midges of economic importance. Vol. VI: gall midges of miscellaneous crops. Crosby Lockwood & Son Ltd., London.
- Barnes, H.F. 1951. Gall midges of economic importance. Vol. V: gall midges of trees. Crosby Lockwood & Son Ltd., London.
- Barnes, H.F. 1956. Gall midges of economic importance. Vol. VII: gall midges of cereal crops. Crosby Lockwood & Son Ltd., London. 261 p.
