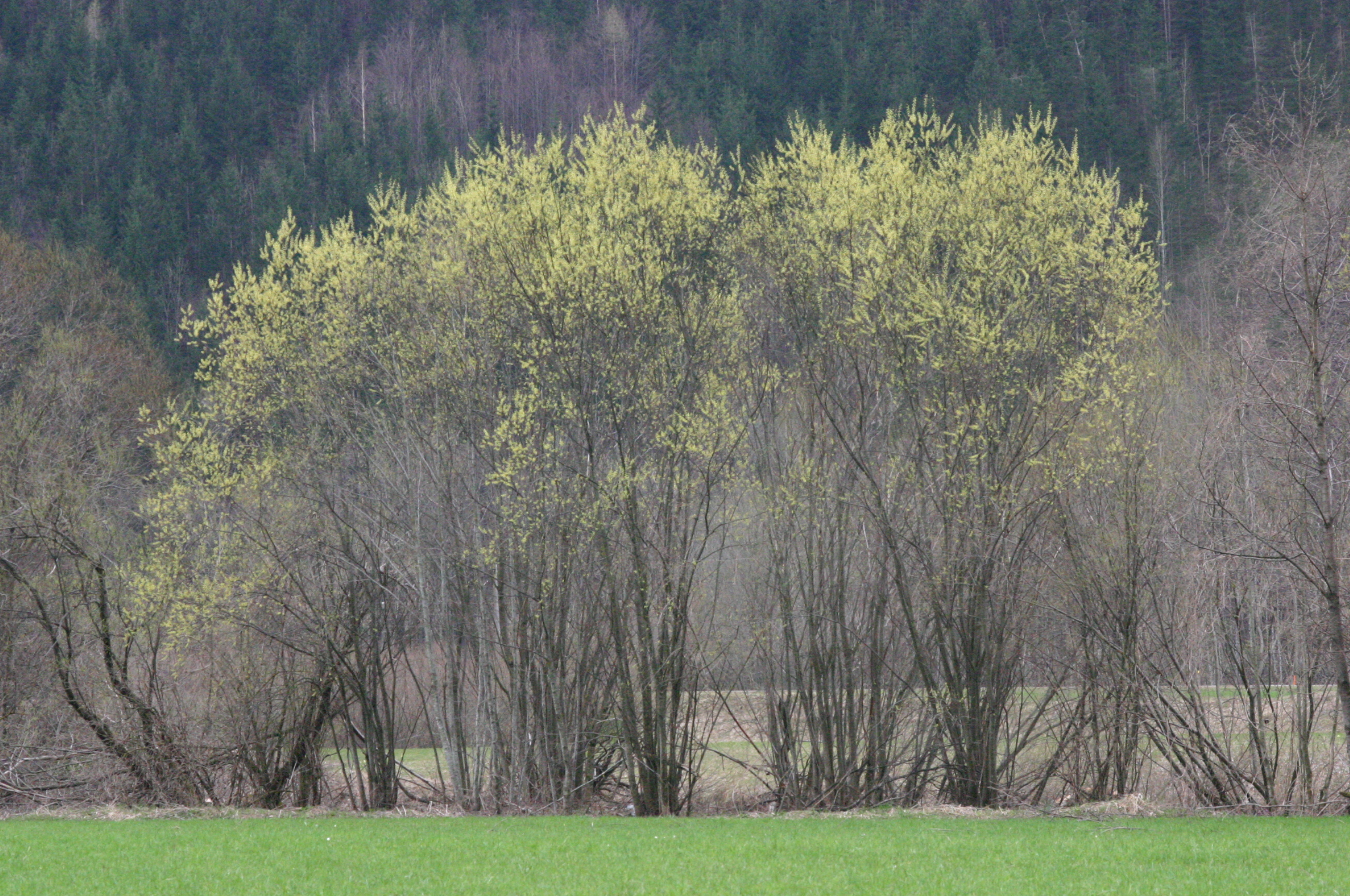

Conservation status
- Least Concern (IUCN 3.1)

Scientific classification
- Kingdom: Plantae
- Clade: Embryophytes
- Clade: Tracheophytes
- Clade: Spermatophytes
- Clade: Angiosperms
- Clade: Eudicots
- Clade: Rosids
- Order: Malpighiales
- Family: Salicaceae
- Genus: Salix
- Species: S. eleagnos

Binomial name
- Salix eleagnos Scop., 1772
- Distribution map

= Salix eleagnos =

Species of flowering plant

Salix eleagnos, the bitter willow, olive willow, hoary willow, rosemary willow, or elaeagnus willow, is a species of flowering plant in the family Salicaceae, native to central and southern Europe and south west Asia. Growing to 3 m (10 ft) tall by 5 m (16 ft) broad, it is an erect bushy deciduous shrub with narrow grey-green leaves up to 20 cm (8 in) long, which turn yellow in autumn (fall). The green catkins, 3–6 cm (1–2 in) long, appear with the leaves in spring, male catkins having yellow anthers.

Like all willows, the species is dioecious. The specific epithet eleagnos is frequently spelt elaeagnos (Elaeagnus, silverberry or oleaster), though the original spelling has been accepted as a correct Greek form.

Salix eleagnos subsp. angustifolia has gained the Royal Horticultural Society's Award of Garden Merit.
