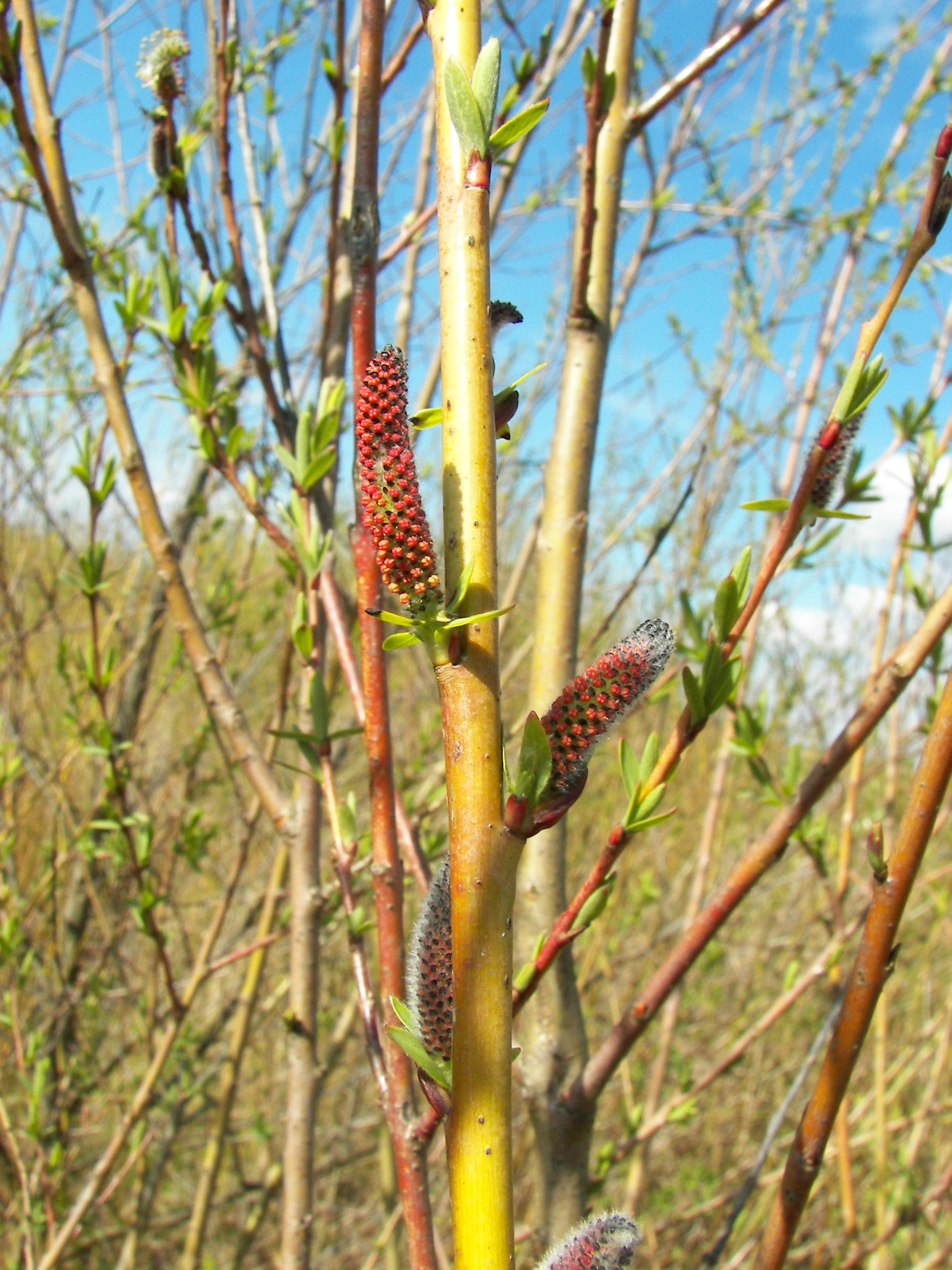
- Catkins

Conservation status
- Least Concern (IUCN 3.1)

Scientific classification
- Kingdom: Plantae
- Clade: Tracheophytes
- Clade: Angiosperms
- Clade: Eudicots
- Clade: Rosids
- Order: Malpighiales
- Family: Salicaceae
- Genus: Salix
- Species: S. purpurea

Binomial name
- Salix purpurea L.

Synonyms
- List: Knafia helix (Walk.) Opiz; Knafia purpurea (L.) Opiz; Nectolis hippophifolia Raf.; Salix ×rubra subsp. elaeagnifolia (Tausch ex Opiz) Celak.; Salix ×traunsteineri A. Kern. ex Andersson; Salix angustior (D. Lautenschl. & Lautenschl.) Landolt; Salix arborescens Hartig; Salix baumgarteniana Schur; Salix bifurcata Chevall.; Salix caesifolia Drobow; Salix carniolica Host; Salix condensata Kit.; Salix condensata Kit. ex Jáv., 1936; Salix dahurica Turcz.; Salix elaeagnifolia Tausch; Salix elaeagnifolia Tausch ex Opiz; Salix fissa var. olivacea (Thuill.) DC.; Salix fuscata Tausch; Salix fuscata Tausch ex Andersson; Salix heliciflora Tausch; Salix heliciflora Tausch ex Andersson; Salix helix J. Walker; Salix helix L.; Salix helix var. olivacea (Thuill.) Mérat; Salix helix var. purpurea (L.) Hampe; Salix helix var. purpurea (L.) Lej.; Salix hippophaeifolia Wimm. & Grab.; Salix hippophifolia Ledeb.; Salix hippophifolia Wimm. & Grab.; Salix hoffmanniana Tausch; Salix hoffmanniana Tausch ex Wimm.; Salix mollissima Wahlenb.; Salix monadelpha Koch; Salix monadelpha Koch ex Schur; Salix monandra Ard.; Salix monandra var. angustifolia DC.; Salix monandra var. brevifolia DC.; Salix monandra var. helix (L.) Boenn.; Salix monandra var. monadelpha Moritzi; Salix monandra var. myrtifolia Boenn.; Salix monandra var. purpurea (L.) Boenn.; Salix monandra var. sericea Ser.; Salix monandra var. subverticillata Ser.; Salix multiformis Döll; Salix mutabilis Host; Salix neilreichii A. Kern.; Salix oleifolia Host; Salix oleifolia Host ex Wimm.; Salix oppositifolia Host; Salix pratensis Scop.; Salix purpurea f. augsburgensis Schwer.; Salix purpurea f. catalaunica Goerz; Salix purpurea f. eriantha Wimm.; Salix purpurea f. furcata Wimm.; Salix purpurea f. gracilis (Gren. & Godr.) C.K. Schneid.; Salix purpurea f. gracilis Wimm.; Salix purpurea f. pendula (Regel) Dippel; Salix purpurea f. sericea (Ser.) Wimm.; Salix purpurea f. styligera Wimm.; Salix purpurea subsp. angustior Lautenschl.; Salix purpurea subsp. embergeri Chass.; Salix purpurea subsp. gracilis (Wimm.) Buser; Salix purpurea subsp. helix (L.) R.I. Schröd.; Salix purpurea subsp. helix (L.) Schübl. & G. Martens; Salix purpurea subsp. scharfenbergensis Bolle; Salix purpurea subsp. uralensis (K.Koch) R.I. Schröd.; Salix purpurea var. alpina Buser; Salix purpurea var. androgyna W.D.J. Koch; Salix purpurea var. angustifolia (DC.) Dumort.; Salix purpurea var. angustifolia A. Kern.; Salix purpurea var. angustifolia Illitsch.; Salix purpurea var. berdaui Zapal.; Salix purpurea var. brevifolia (DC.) Dumort.; Salix purpurea var. dniestrensis Zapal.; Salix purpurea var. embergeri (Chass.) Maire; Salix purpurea var. fissa Lej.; Salix purpurea var. gracilis Gren. & Godr.; Salix purpurea var. gracilis Wallr.; Salix purpurea var. helix (L.) Rchb.; Salix purpurea var. helix (L.) W.D.J. Koch; Salix purpurea var. hispanica Goerz; Salix purpurea var. humilior Lej.; Salix purpurea var. leioandra Zapal.; Salix purpurea var. macrocarpa Wallr.; Salix purpurea var. malacensis Goerz; Salix purpurea var. monodelpha W.D.J. Koch; Salix purpurea var. nana Dieck; Salix purpurea var. pendula Regel; Salix purpurea var. ramulosa (Borrer) Bab.; Salix purpurea var. rossmaessleri Willk.; Salix purpurea var. rossmaessleri Willk. ex Lange; Salix purpurea var. sandomiriensis Zapal.; Salix purpurea var. scharfenbergensis Bolle; Salix purpurea var. sericea (Ser.) Dumort.; Salix purpurea var. smithiana F.W. Schultz; Salix purpurea var. subverticillata (Ser.) Dumort.; Salix purpurea var. vistulensis Zapal.; Salix purpurea var. wollgariana (Borrer) Bab.; Salix ritschelii Andersson; Salix roopii (Goerz) Grossh.; Salix rosea Gray; Salix rossmaessleri Willk.; Salix rossmaessleri Willk. ex Andersson; Salix rubra var. helix (L.) Syme; Salix sansoniana Turcz.; Salix semihelix Lasch ex Wimm.; Salix seringeana Lecoq & Lamotte; Salix sphaerocephala A.Kern.; Salix tenuijulis var. roopii Goerz; Salix tenuis Tausch; Salix uralensis K. Koch; Salix viminalis Turcz.; Vetrix helix (L.) Raf.; Vetrix purpurea (L.) Raf.; Vetrix sicula Raf.

= Salix purpurea =

Species of willow

Salix purpurea, known in Britain as purple willow, is a shrub or small tree native to Europe, western Asia and northwest Africa. It has been introduced to many other parts of the world as an ornamental garden plant, and it is widely used in basket making. Within its native range and some places where it is naturalised it is found in wetlands such as lake margins and the floodplains of rivers.

== Description ==
Purple willow is a dioecious shrub or small tree up to about 5 m tall, usually with numerous stems. The bark is greyish and smooth, with a bitter taste. The vegetative parts of the plant are all glabrous. The twigs and young branches are terete and flexible, often yellowish or tinged with purple.

The leaves are - unusually, for a willow - opposite or almost opposite and narrowly oblong in shape, with a pointed tip, ranging from 2 cm to about 10 cm long. In bud, each leaf is covered by a single scale. They are a characteristically dull, pale green when fresh, turning black if the stems are harvested. The margins are entire or slightly serrated towards the tip. The petioles are very short and the stipules usually fall early.

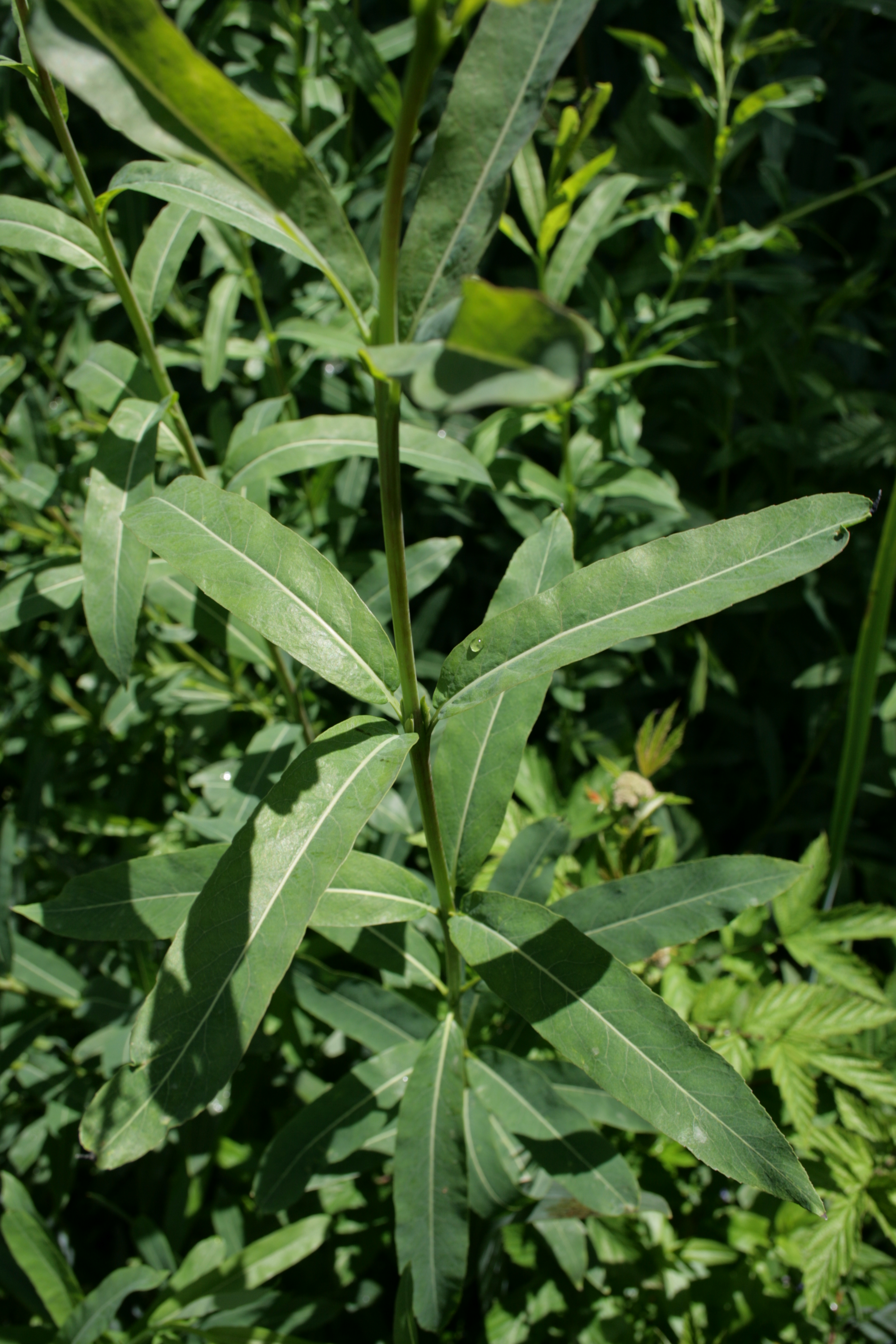
The leaves can be alternate, subopposite or (very rarely) almost in whorls of three

Catkins appear before the leaves in the spring, and have either male or female flowers (on separate plants). They are narrowly cylindrical and usually held upright, about 3 cm long by 0.5 cm wide. Each catkin is typically subtended by 2 or 3 small bracts. The rhachis is densely hairy, as are the black catkin scales, which are bracteoles subtending each flower. The perianth (sepals and petals) is reduced to 1-2 tiny nectaries. The male catkins have flowers with 2 long stamens, exceeding the scales, and red anthers which open at maturity to reveal bright yellow pollen; the female ones have 2 bifid stigmas on a very short style. The fruit is a capsule about 4 mm long by half as wide, with a plume of hairs arising from the base.

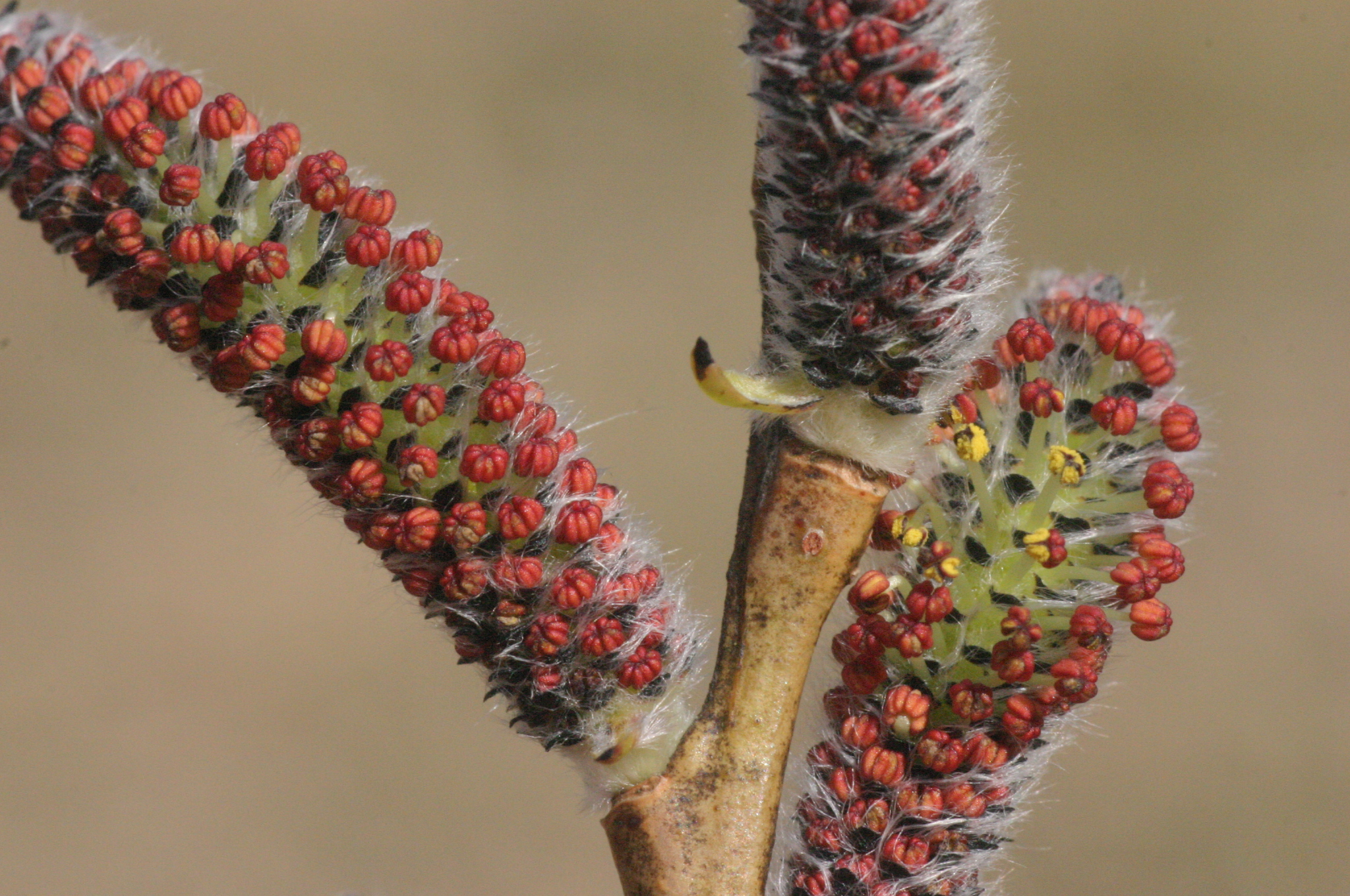
The male catkins have red anthers

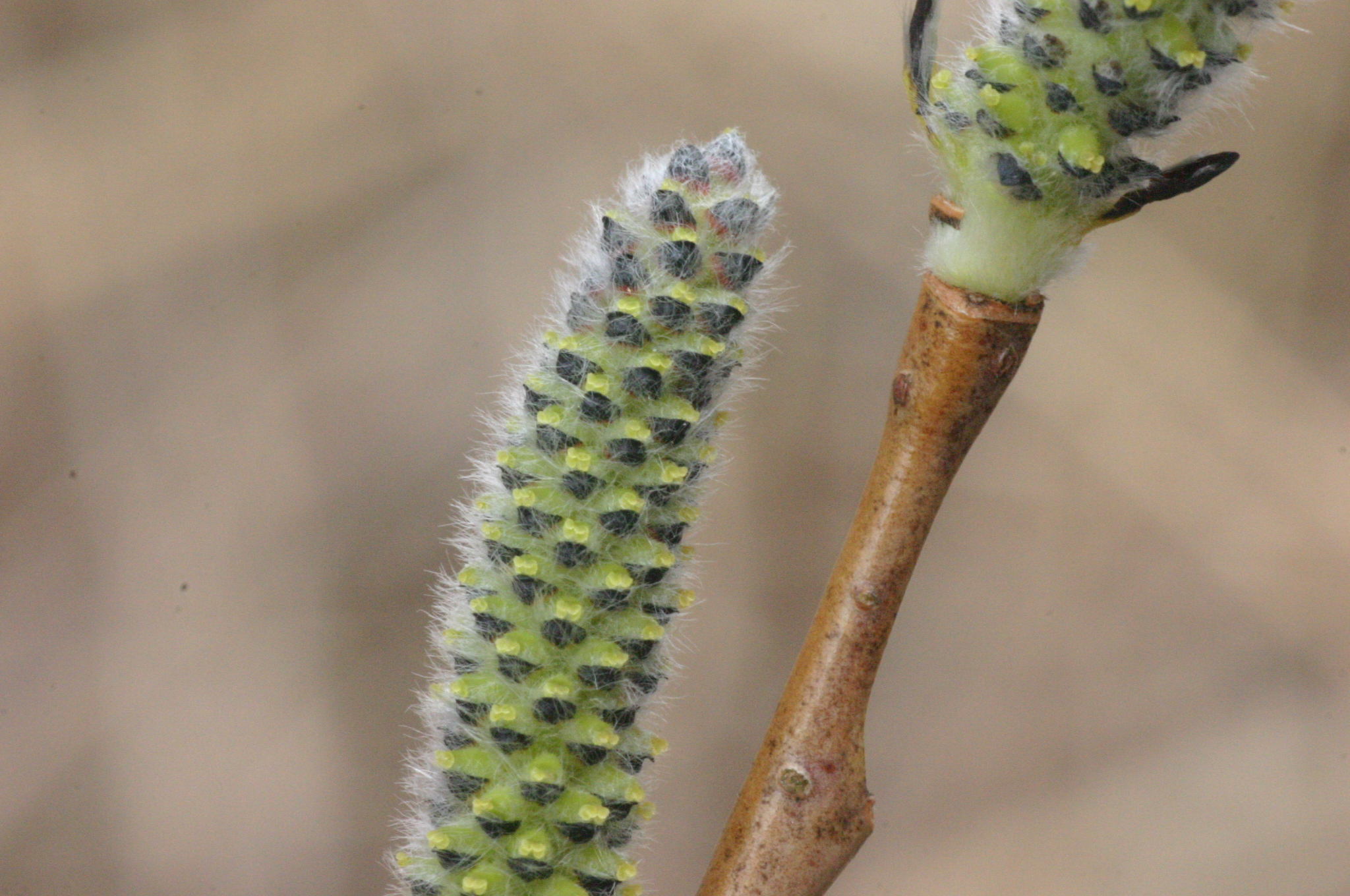
Female catkins

== Taxonomy ==
The scientific name Salix purpurea was given by Linnaeus in 1753, in Species Plantarum, vol. 2, p. 1017. He gave as a synonym his own polynomial description from Iter Scanicum, his report on a journey through the Swedish countryside in 1749. He wrote "Salix foliis serratis glabris-lanceolatis: inferioribus oppositis" (the willow with serrated, glabrous, lanceolate leaves, the lower ones being opposite). He also quoted John Ray, who described it as "Salix folio longo subluteo non auriculata, viminibus rubris" (the willow with long yellowish leaves, no auricles, and red stems).

The name Salix is an ancient Proto-Indo-European word for willow which comes down to modern English as "sallow." It was a word in Roman times, probably derived from Gallic: Pliny the Elder used it in his Naturalis Historia, but it may not have been in common use, because Dioscorides did not; his word for willow was "iter". The epithet purpurea simply means purple-coloured, which could refer to the male flowers or to the stems and leaves, which can have a distinctly purplish tinge, especially as they dry.

Other common names for purple willow include purpleosier willow, and purple osier.

Its chromosome number is 2n = 38.

Purple willow is part of a complex of related species and there have been many attempts to create a coherent taxonomy. It is a combination of two Linnaean species, as the modern concept includes Salix helix L.. Leaves vary from narrowly oblong to more broadly ovate; some varieties have serrated leaves while others are entire; and the colour of the stems is highly variable. The female flowers have also been used to describe separate taxa: some have bifid stigmas while others are ovate. The current understanding is that the numerous forms that occur in central and eastern Asia are different species, whereas S. purpurea accounts only for the European and North African plants, and just reaches into western Asia, but not as far as Moscow. Just four subspecies and forms are currently accepted:

- Salix purpurea subsp. eburnea (Borzì) Cif. & Giacom. ex S.Pignatti – Sardinia
- S. purpurea f. gracilis Wimm. – Belgium, Germany, Poland, Switzerland, and Spain
- S. purpurea subsp. leucodermis Yalt. – Turkey
- S. purpurea subsp. purpurea – Europe, the Caucasus, Turkey, and northwestern Africa

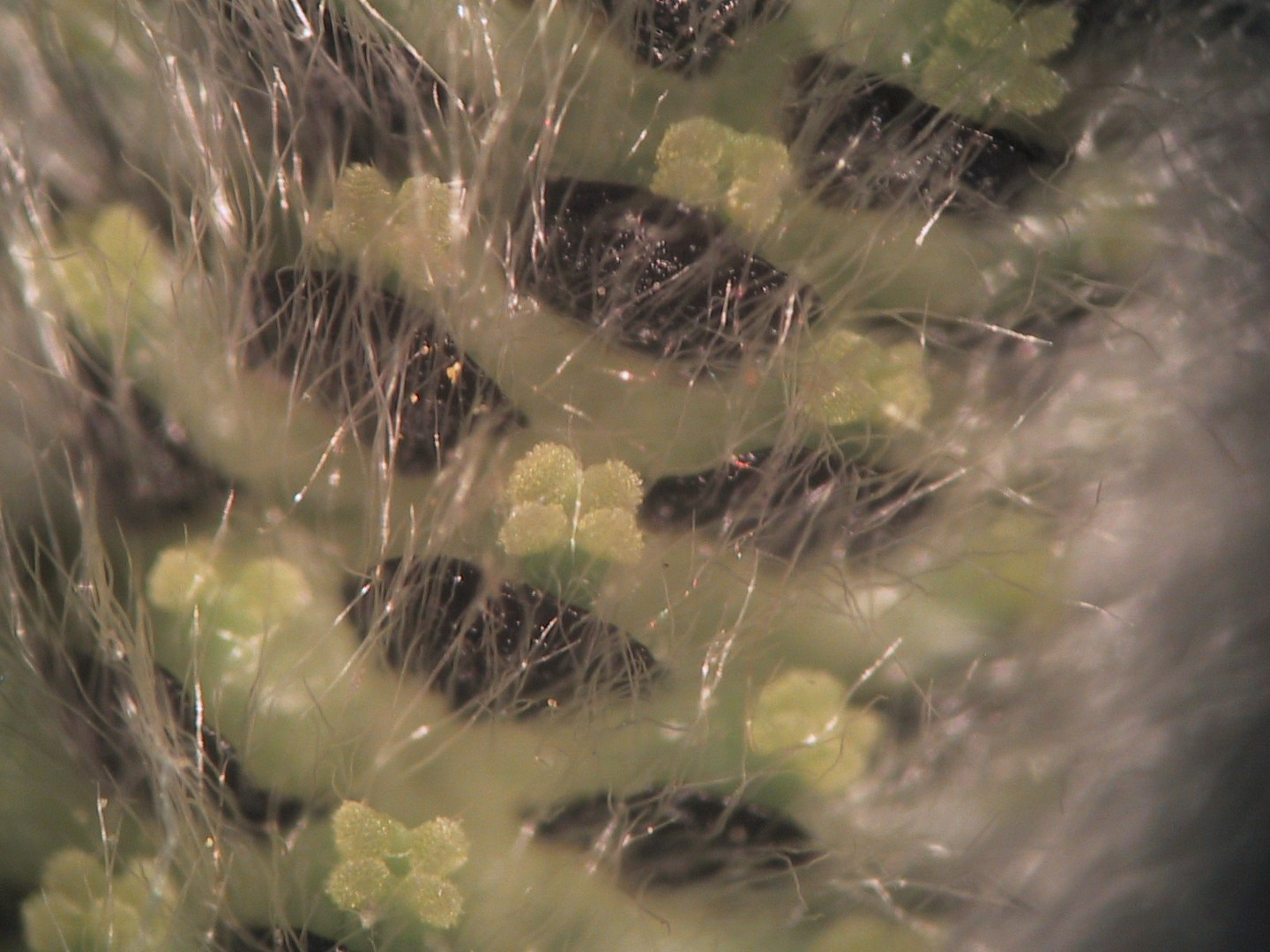
Close-up of the female flowers, showing the bifid stigmas characteristic of some varieties

Hybridization is common within the Salicaceae, and purple willow is thought to form the following crosses:

- Salix triandra x purpurea = S. ^{x}leiophylla auct., non E.G. & A. Camus - in continental Europe, not Britain & Ireland (BI)
- S. purpurea x viminalis = S. ^{x}rubra Huds. (green-leaved willow) - scattered throughout BI
- S. purpurea x viminalis x cinerea = S. ^{x}forbyana Sm. (fine basket-osier) - scattered in BI, in old withy beds
- S. purpurea x viminalis x repens - very rare; Sefton coast and Germany
- S. purpurea x cinerea = S. ^{x}pontederiana - very rare in BI
- S. purpurea x cinerea x aurita = S. ^{x}confinis E.G. & A. Camus - Scotland and Europe
- S. purpurea x aurita = S. ^{x}dichroa Döll - Northumberland
- S. purpurea x myrsinifolia = S. ^{x}beckiana L.C. Beck - Northumberland and central Europe
- S. purpurea x phylicifolia = S. ^{x}seceneta F.B. White - northern England and Scotland
- S. purpurea x repens = S. ^{x}doniana G. Anderson ex Sm. (Don's willow) - widespread

== Distribution and status ==
The native range is southern Europe and north Africa, extending as far north as Denmark and eastwards to Turkey and the Baltic states. It is only just in western Russia: plants further east are a different species in the Salix purpurea group. Britain may be at the northern edge of its range, or it might be introduced there, as it is thought to be in Scandinavia. It has also been introduced into many other parts of the world, mostly as an ornamental plant. It is naturalised in wetlands in North America.

Its altitudinal range is from sea level to 1,400 m in Britain, to 2,000 m in the Alps and the Pyrenees, and as high as 2,500 m at the southern edge of its range, in the Atlas mountains.

Its status globally and in Britain is LC (least concern). In most counties in Britain it is considered an axiophyte because it is restricted to wetlands with a high conservation value, whether it is native there or not.

== Habitat and ecology ==
Within its native range of southern Europe and north Africa, purple willow is most characteristic of the EUNIS habitat F9.122 Western Mediterranean purple willow scrub, which comprises stands of purple, olive- and almond willow lining watercourses.

It is also found in riverside scrub in Britain and northern France. In Britain this is classified as W6 Salix fragilis woodland. Here it could possibly be native or is more likely to have been planted, as osier beds were often cultivated within floodplains. Another native habitat for it is beside lakes such as the ancient glacial lakes of the Meres and Mosses region of the Shropshire-Cheshire plain. Here it grows in grey willow carr, sometimes in standing water, and is considered an indicator of ancient woodland. In France its habitat is very similar.

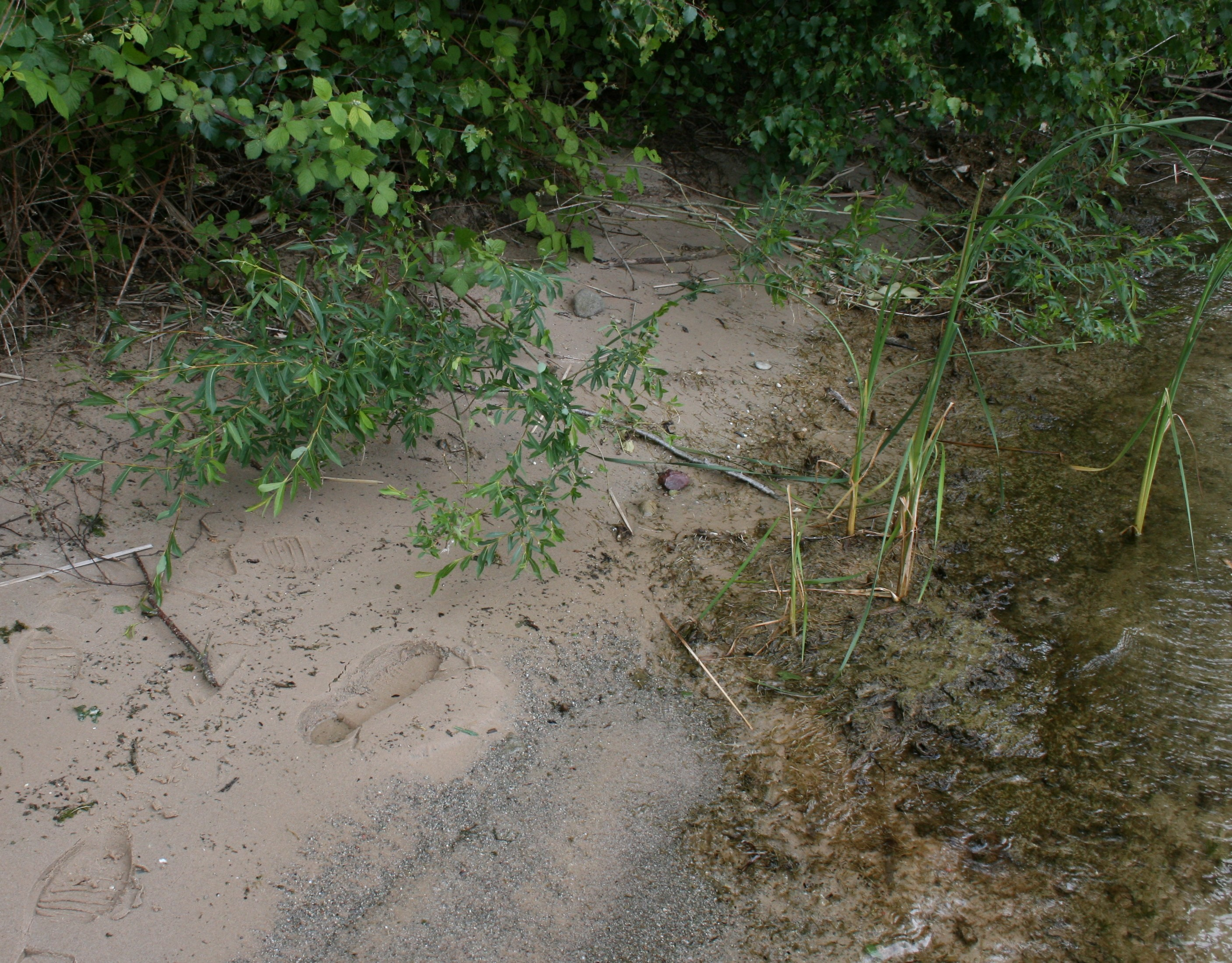
Purple willow on the margin of Bomere Pool, Shropshire

Its Ellenberg-type indicator values are L=8, F=8, R=8, N=5 and S=0, which show that it has a preference for bright sunlight, very wet conditions, base-rich water, low fertility and no salinity.

There are many organisms associated with purple willow. The Plant Parasites of Europe website lists 247 species, of which 209 are insects, 25 fungi, 12 mites and one a single-celled organism. Among the insects are 39 species of beetle, 62 true bugs, 23 bees, wasps and ants and 61 Lepidoptera (butterflies or moths).

Three of these may be monophagous on purple willow:

- Euura salicispurpureae is a mite which produces galls in young shoots of purple willow and its hybrids
- Aculus truncatus is another species of mite which galls the leaf margins of purple willow, causing curling
- Rabdophaga purpureaperda is a midge which forms galls in the tips of shoots

Other significant parasites include:

- The sawfly Euura proxima, which produces red bean-shaped swellings on the upper surface of the leaves of this and other willows
- Euura viminalis, which creates spherical pale green galls on the lower surface of the leaves of purple willow or common osier
- Rabdophaga degeerii, which causes swellings in the shoots in northern Britain
- The poplar hawkmoth, whose larvae feed on willow leaves.

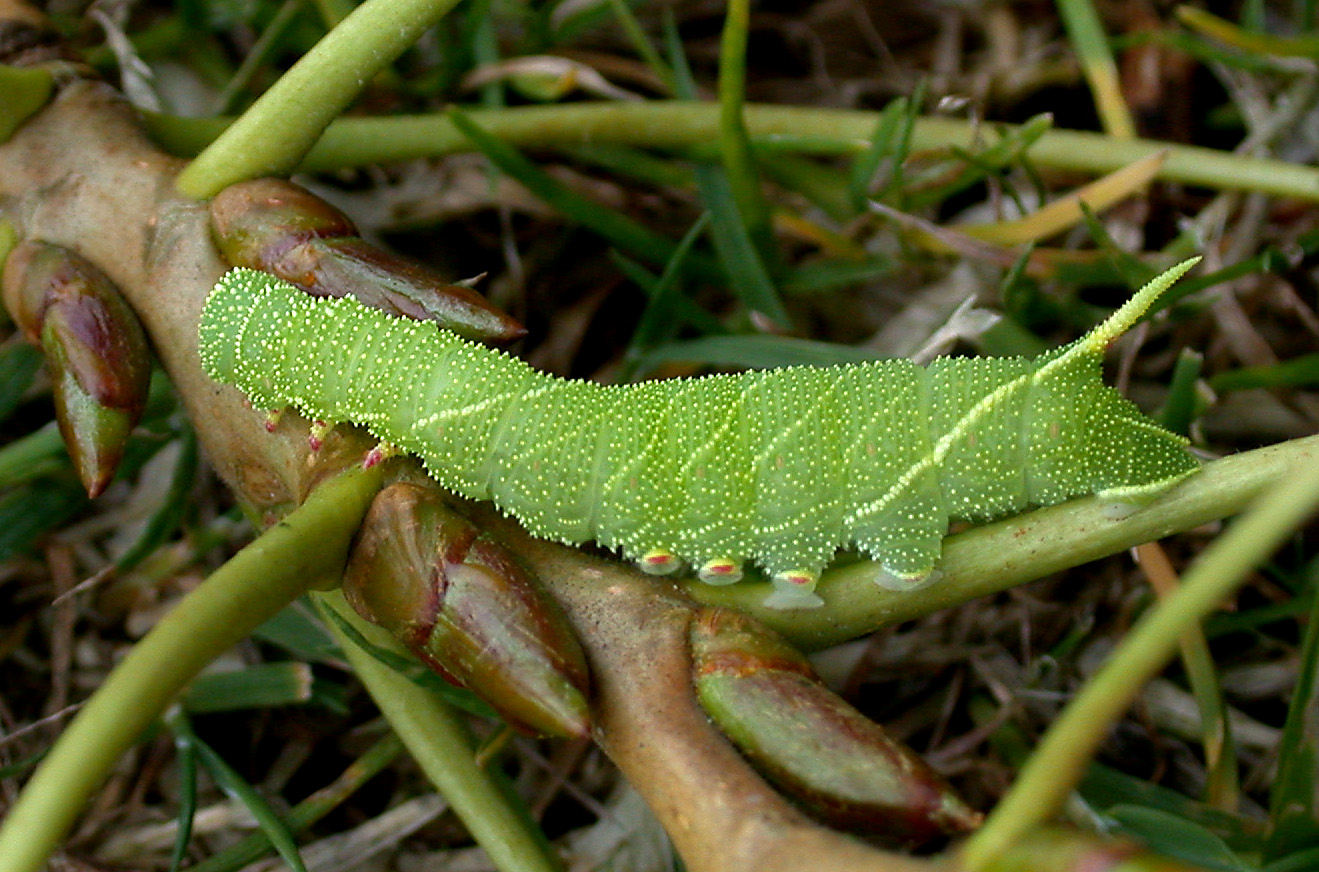
Poplar hawkmoth caterpillar (shown here on a poplar shoot)

Willows are largely insect-pollinated, and the flowers produce a distinctive scent to attract various bees, flies and other pollinators. They are considered a useful source of nectar for sustaining insect populations early in the year. However, there is some evidence that willows can be wind-pollinated as well.

== Uses ==
Purple willow has long been used for basket making and is still harvested for that purpose, when it is often known as "Brittany Green" willow, valued for its purple colour and evenly-sized stems (i.e. remaining the same thickness along its length). Willow beds were often planted with a variety of plants: the British botanist Charles Sinker documented a withy bed at Crew Green in Wales which contained five species and three hybrids.

The weeping cultivar 'Pendula' has gained the Royal Horticultural Society's Award of Garden Merit. As with several other willows, the shoots, called withies, are often used in basketry. The wood of this and other willow species is used in making cricket bats.

The Roman herbalist Dioscorides had many uses for iter (willow): taken with pepper and wine it would help people with intestinal obstruction, or effect birth control, and the juice of the leaves (with other ingredients) would help sores in the ears. The bark, when burned and mixed with vinegar, would take away calluses and corns. Culpeper suggested that the boughs of willow, stuck about a chamber, would refresh those who had fevers.

More recent herbalists have had less use for willow. Mrs Grieve did not mention purple willow at all. This could be because the effects of consumption can include gastrointestinal bleeding and kidney damage, and just eating the leaves can cause severe abdominal pain.
