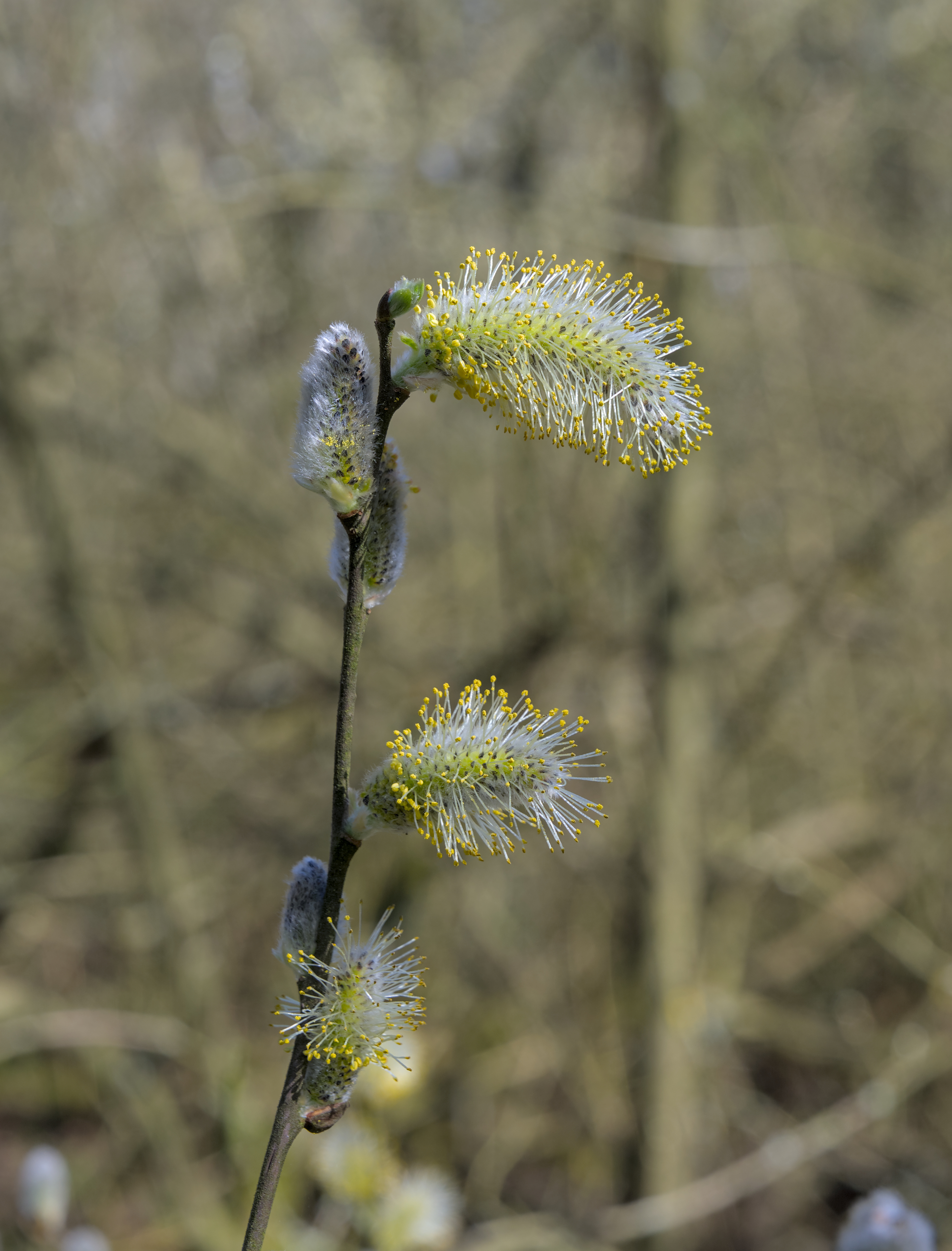
- Goat willow male catkins

Conservation status
- Least Concern (IUCN 3.1)

Scientific classification
- Kingdom: Plantae
- Clade: Tracheophytes
- Clade: Angiosperms
- Clade: Eudicots
- Clade: Rosids
- Order: Malpighiales
- Family: Salicaceae
- Genus: Salix
- Species: S. caprea

Binomial name
- Salix caprea L.
- Distribution map

Synonyms
- List: Capraea vulgaris Opiz; Nectopix caprea (L.) Raf.; Salix aurigerana Lapeyr.; Salix bakko Kimura; Salix caprea f. elongata (Nakai) Kitag.; Salix caprea var. ishidoyana (Nakai) M.Kim; Salix caprea var. lanatifolia Björnstr.; Salix caprea var. pendula T.Lang; Salix coaetanea (Hartm.) Flod.; Salix hallaisanensis H.Lév.; Salix hultenii Flod.; Salix ishidoyana Nakai; Salix lanata Vill.; Salix sphacelata Sm.; Salix tomentosa var. androgyna Ser.; Salix tomentosa var. macrophylla Ser.; Salix tomentosa var. rotundifolia Ser.; Salix tomentosa var. tenuifolia Ser.; Salix tomentosa var. ternata Ser.

= Salix caprea =

Species of tree

Salix caprea, known as goat willow, pussy willow or great sallow, is a common species of willow native to Europe and western and central Asia.

== Description ==
It is a deciduous shrub or small tree, reaching a height of 8–10 m (26–33 ft), rarely to over 20 m, with the tallest specimen reported being 26.2 m tall, in Nuuksio National Park in Finland.

The leaves are 3–12 cm long and from 2.5–8 cm wide, broader than most other willows, dull green and slightly hairy above, grey and woolly pubescent below.

The flowers are soft silky, and silvery 3-7-cm-long catkins are produced in early spring before the new leaves appear; the male and female catkins are on different plants (dioecious). The male catkins mature yellow at pollen release, the female catkins mature pale green.

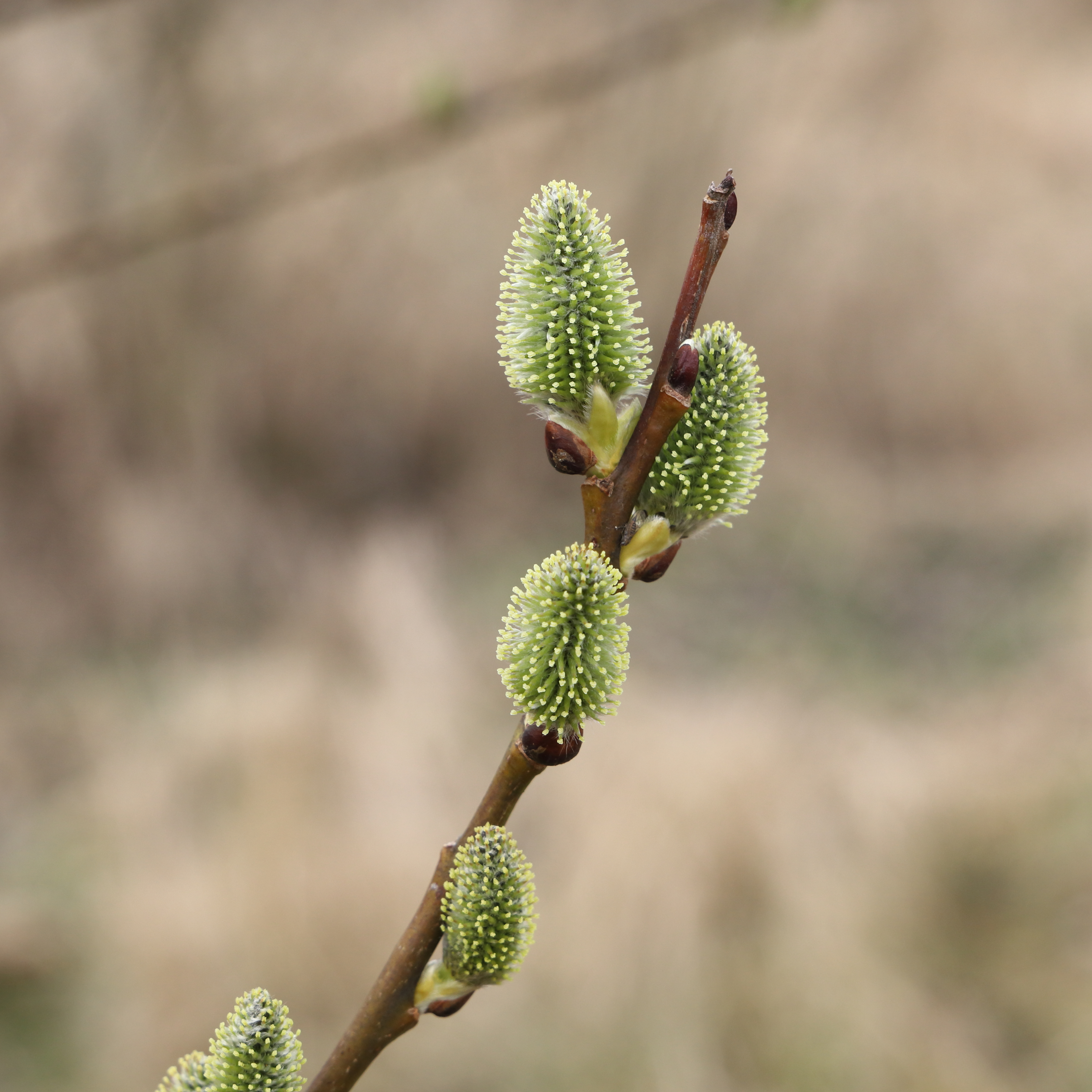
Female catkins

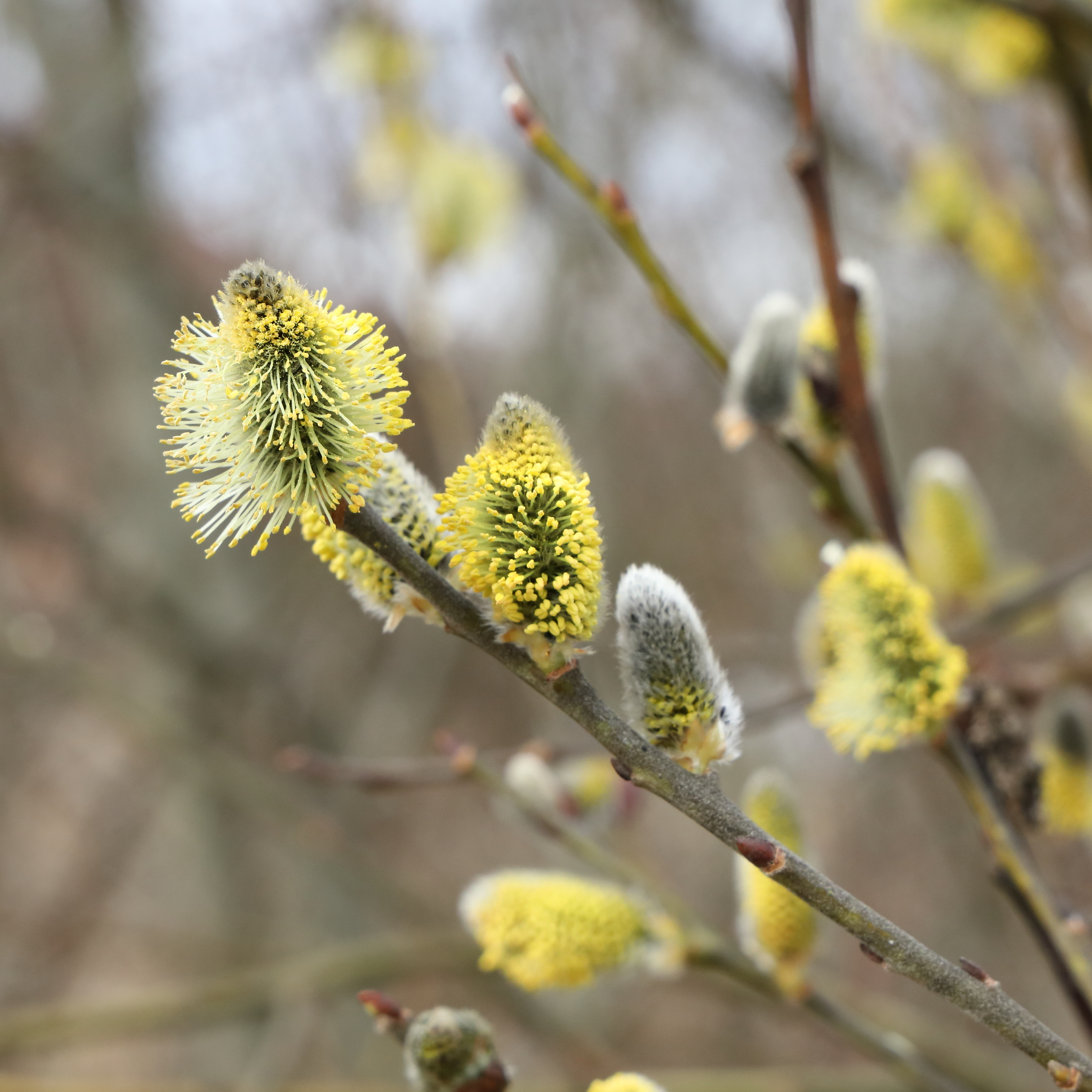
Male catkins

The fruit is a small capsule 5–10 mm long containing numerous minute seeds embedded in fine, cottony hairs. The seeds are very small (about 0.2 mm) with the fine hairs aiding dispersal; they require bare soil to germinate.

The two varieties are:

- S. c. var. caprea - lowland regions throughout the range, leaves thinly hairy above, densely hairy below, 5–12 cm long, stipules persistent until autumn
- S. c. var. sphacelata (Sm.) Wahlenb. (syn. S. caprea var. coaetanea Hartm.; S. coaetanea (Hartm.) Floderus) - high altitudes in the mountains of central and northern Europe (Alps, Carpathians, Scotland, Scandinavia), leaves densely silky-hairy on both sides, 3–7 cm long, stipules early deciduous.

== Name ==
The Latin specific epithet caprea means "goat". This, and the common name goat willow, probably derive from the first known illustration of the species in Hieronymus Bock's 1546 Herbal, where the plant is shown being browsed by a goat. The species was historically also widely used as a browse for goats, to which Bock's illustration may refer.

== Ecology ==
S. caprea occurs both in wet/damp environments, such as riverbanks and lake shores, and in drier sites, wherever bare soil becomes available due to ground disturbance.

Hybrids with several other willow species are common, notably with Salix cinerea (S. × reichardtii), Salix aurita (S. × multinervis), Salix viminalis (S. × smithiana), and Salix purpurea (S. × sordida). Populations of S. caprea often show hybrid introgression.

Unlike almost all other willows, pure specimens do not take root readily from cuttings; if a willow resembling the species does root easily, it is probably a hybrid with another species of willow.

The leaves are used as a food resource by several species of Lepidoptera, and are also commonly eaten by browsing mammals. Willows are very susceptible to gall inducers, and the midge Rhabdophaga rosaria forms the camellia gall on S. caprea.

== Cultivation and uses ==
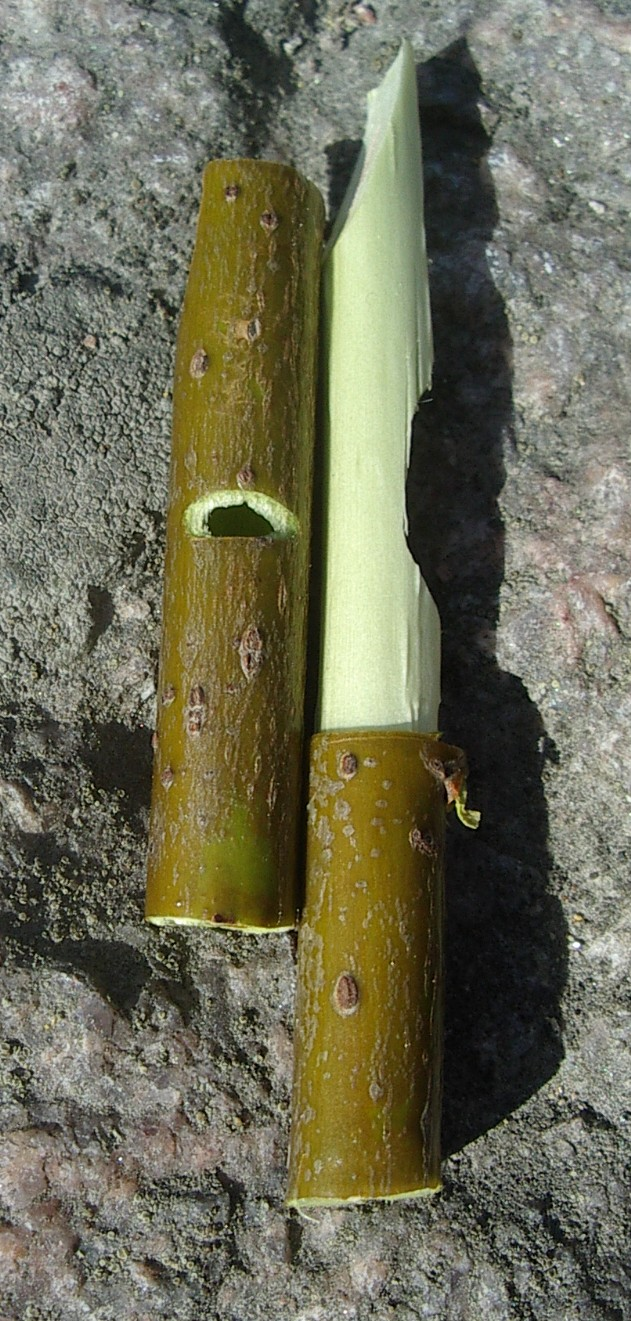
A willow flute

A small number of cultivars have been selected for garden use. The most common is S. caprea 'Kilmarnock', discovered by James Smith, with stiffly pendulous shoots forming a mop-head; it is a male clone. A similar female clone is S. caprea 'Weeping Sally'. As they do not form a leader, they are grafted on erect stems of other willows; the height of these cultivars is determined by the height at which the graft is made. Plants can also be grown from greenwood cuttings, which make attractive creeping mounds. Hardwood cuttings are often difficult to root.

Both tannin and salicin can be extracted from goat willow bark. The tree is not considered a good source of timber, as its wood is both brittle and known to crackle violently if burned.

As with the closely related Salix discolor (American pussy willow), it is also often grown for cut flowers. See Pussy for further cultural information, which applies to both species.

In North Europe it has been fairly common to make willow flutes from goat willow cuttings.

In Germany, Hungary, north of Slovakia, Poland, Ukraine and many parts of Finland, the just-opened catkins are used like the olive branches on Palm Sunday.
