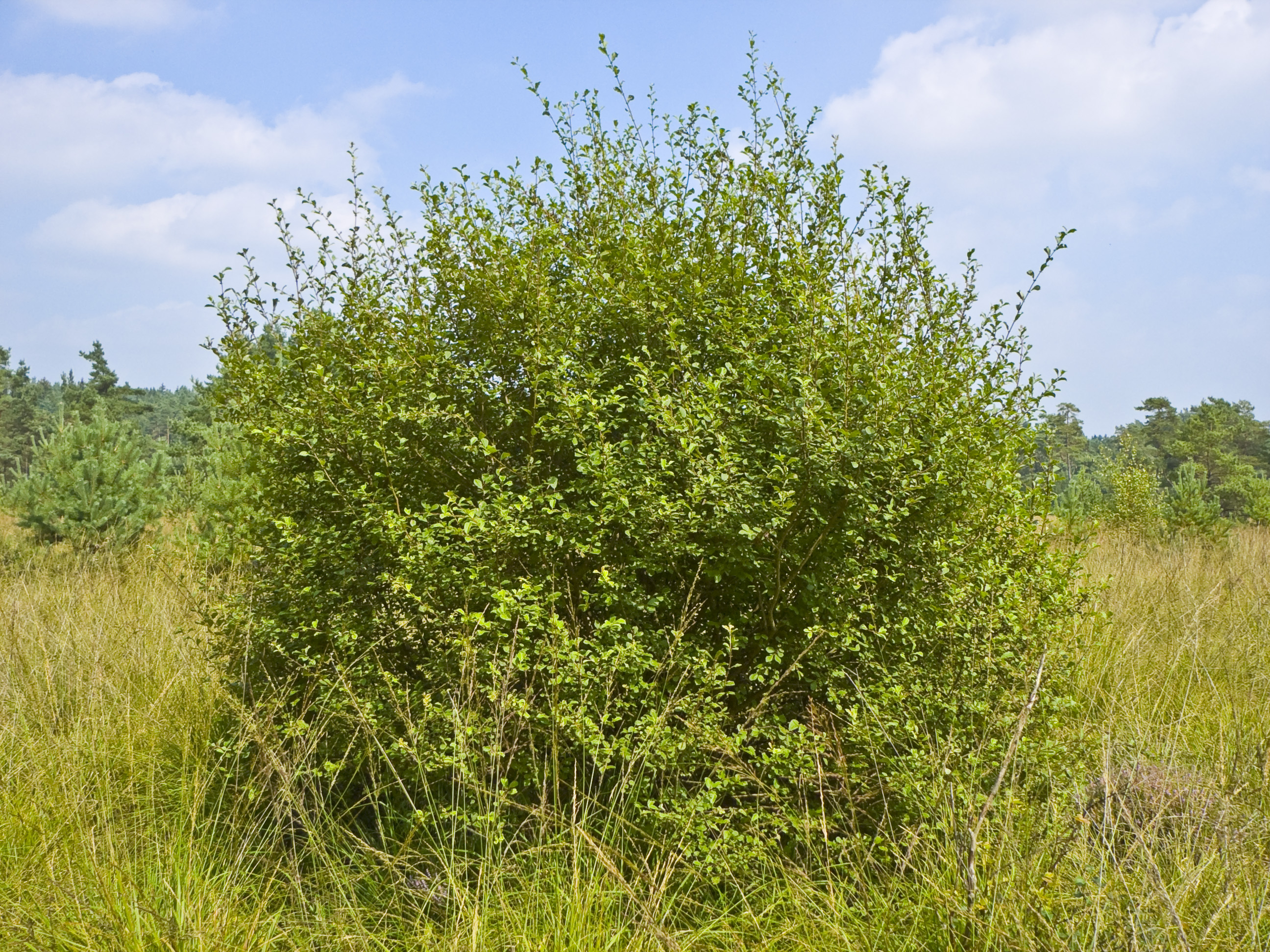

Scientific classification
- Kingdom: Plantae
- Clade: Tracheophytes
- Clade: Angiosperms
- Clade: Eudicots
- Clade: Rosids
- Order: Malpighiales
- Family: Salicaceae
- Genus: Salix
- Species: S. aurita

Binomial name
- Salix aurita L.

= Salix aurita =

Species of shrub

Salix aurita, the eared willow, is a species of willow distributed over much of Europe, and occasionally cultivated. It is a shrub to 2.5 m in height, distinguished from the similar but slightly larger Salix cinerea by its reddish petioles and young twigs. It was named for its persistent kidney-shaped stipules along the shoots.

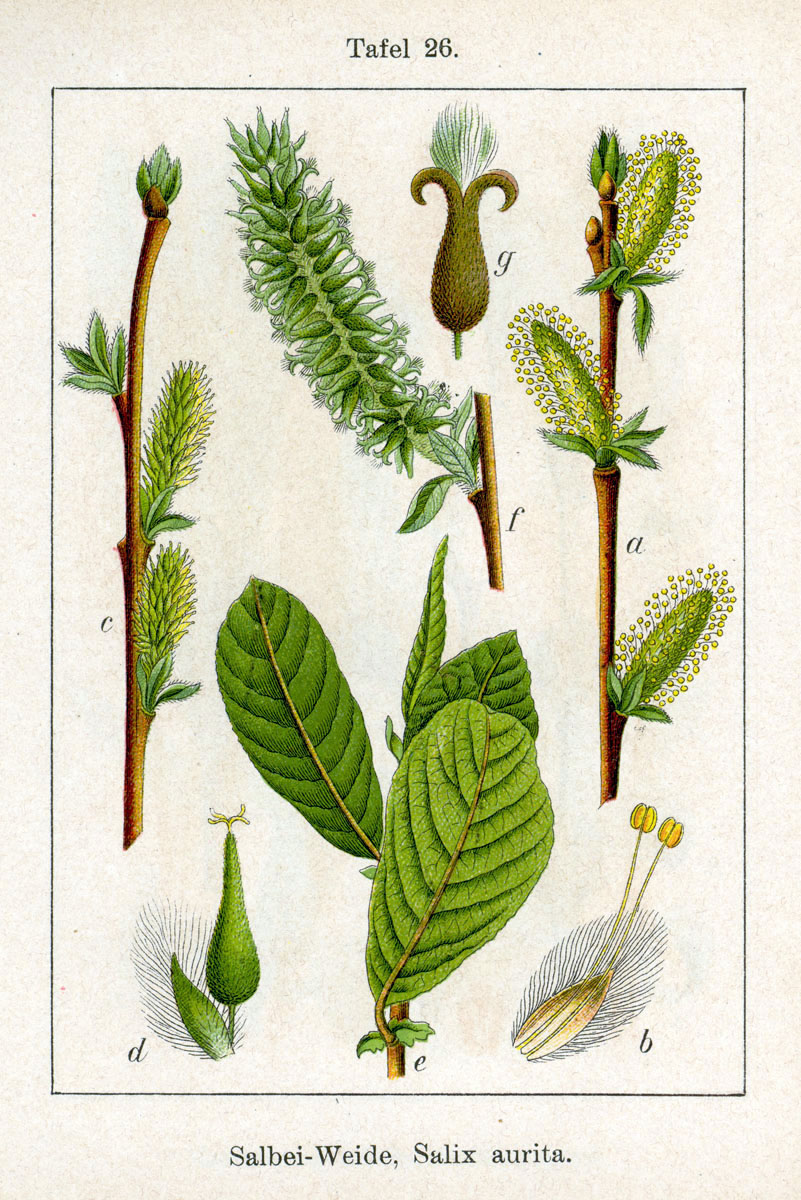
