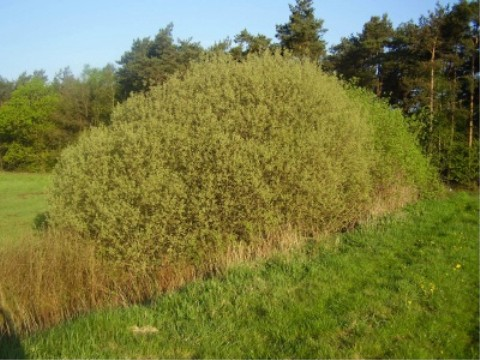
- Salix cinerea subsp. cinerea, Germany

Conservation status
- Least Concern (IUCN 3.1)

Scientific classification
- Kingdom: Plantae
- Clade: Tracheophytes
- Clade: Angiosperms
- Clade: Eudicots
- Clade: Rosids
- Order: Malpighiales
- Family: Salicaceae
- Genus: Salix
- Species: S. cinerea

Binomial name
- Salix cinerea L.
- Distribution map

= Salix cinerea =

Species of willow

Salix cinerea (common sallow, grey sallow, grey willow, grey-leaved sallow, large grey willow, pussy willow, rusty sallow) is a species of willow native to Europe and western Asia.

The plant provides a great deal of nectar for pollinators. It was rated in the top 10, with a ranking of second place, for most nectar production (nectar per unit cover per year) in a UK plants survey conducted by the AgriLand project which is supported by the UK Insect Pollinators Initiative.

== Description ==
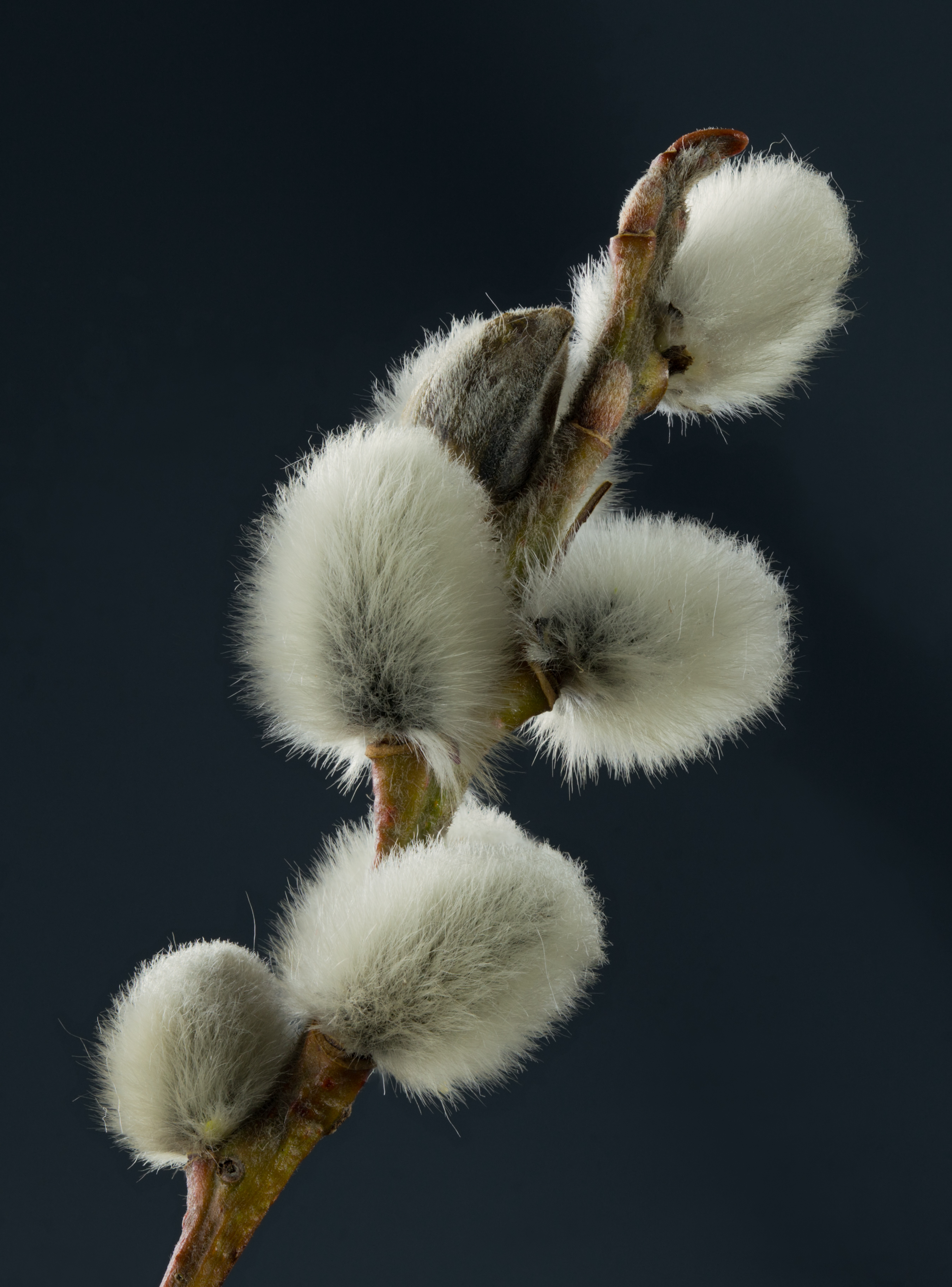
Close-ups of Salicaceae flowers

It is a deciduous shrub or small tree growing 4–10 metres (13–30 ft) tall. The leaves are spirally arranged, 2–9 cm (1–3 1/2 in) long and 1–3 cm (1/2–1 1/2 in) broad (exceptionally up to 16 cm long and 5 cm broad), green above, hairy below, with a crenate margin. The flowers are produced in early spring in catkins 2–5 cm long; it is dioecious with male and female catkins on separate plants. The male catkins are silvery at first, turning yellow when the pollen is released; the female catkins are greenish grey, maturing in early summer to release the numerous tiny seeds embedded in white cottony down which assists wind dispersal.

== Taxonomy ==
The closely related species Salix atrocinerea Brot., which overlaps in distribution in France, Belgium, Netherlands, England and Ireland, is considered by some authors as the subspecies S. cinerea oleifolia (Gaudin) Macreight. S. atrocinerea differs from S. cinerea in that it is taller (reaching up to 15 metres), has a deeply furrowed bark, dark red-brown hairs beneath the leaves, smaller stipules, and is earlier deciduous. Despite the coexistence of these two nomenclatures, the main taxonomic databases regard S. cinerea oleifolia as synonym of S. atrocinerea.

== Ecology ==
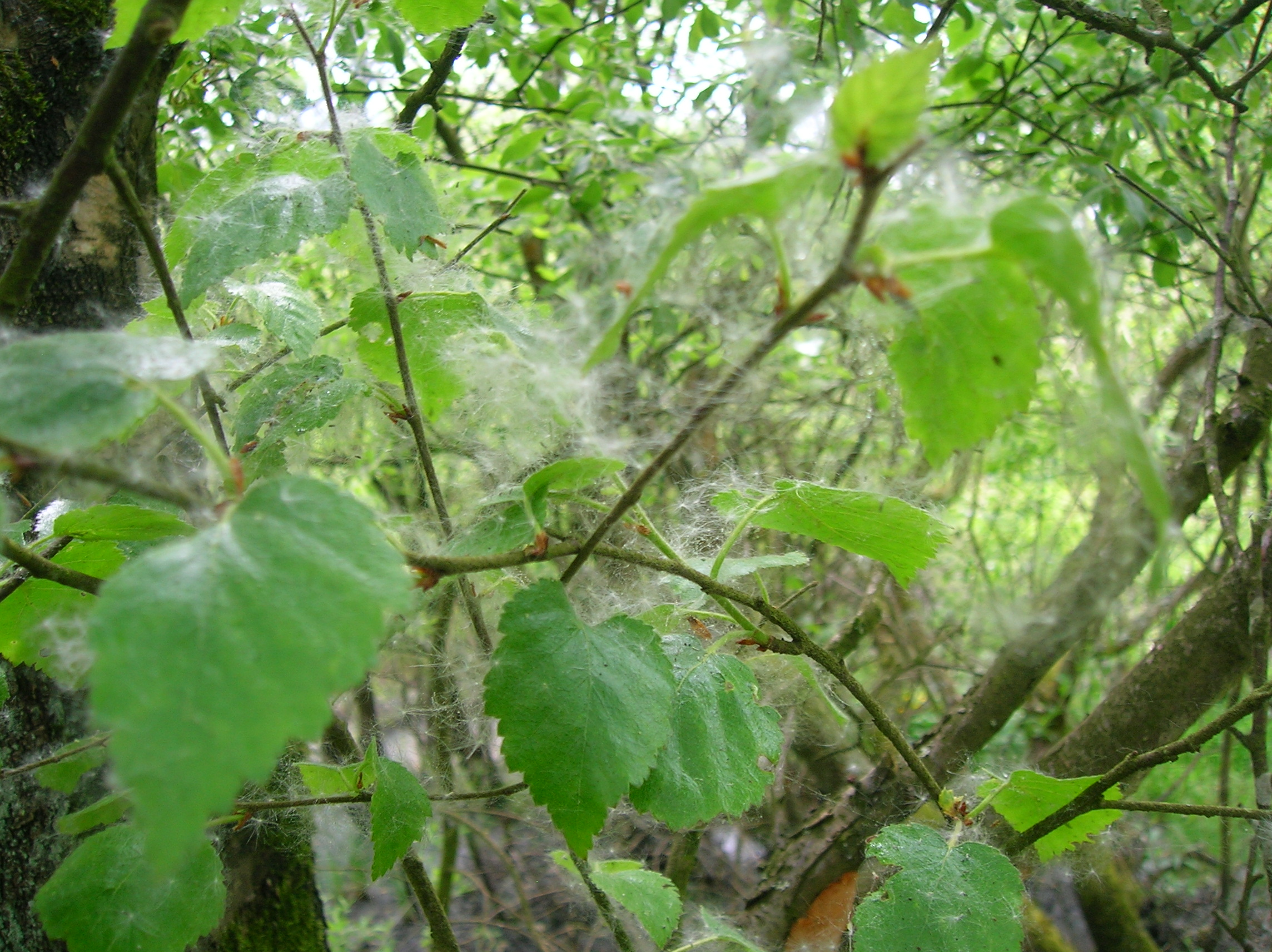
Salix cinerea seeds on a birch tree branch

Grey willow grows in wetlands, moist depressions, ditches, embankments, banks of stagnant or slow-moving water bodies, and forest edges, where it encounters low-lying damp situations with waterlogged and nutrient-poor soils. S. cinerea is a pioneer species that rapidly colonizes disturbed sites.

A common herbivore of Salix cinerea is Phratora vulgatissima, which prefers and is more common on female plants. Anthocoris nemorum, a natural enemy of Phratora vulgatissima, is also more common on S. cinerea.

== Invasive species ==
Salix cinerea is an invasive species in New Zealand and is listed on the National Pest Plant Accord, which means it cannot be sold or distributed. S. cinerea is also highly invasive in south-eastern Australia, with the entire genus listed as a Weed of National Significance. The species was introduced to stop erosion along riverbanks, but has since caused worse erosion over time by widening and shallowing invaded streams.
