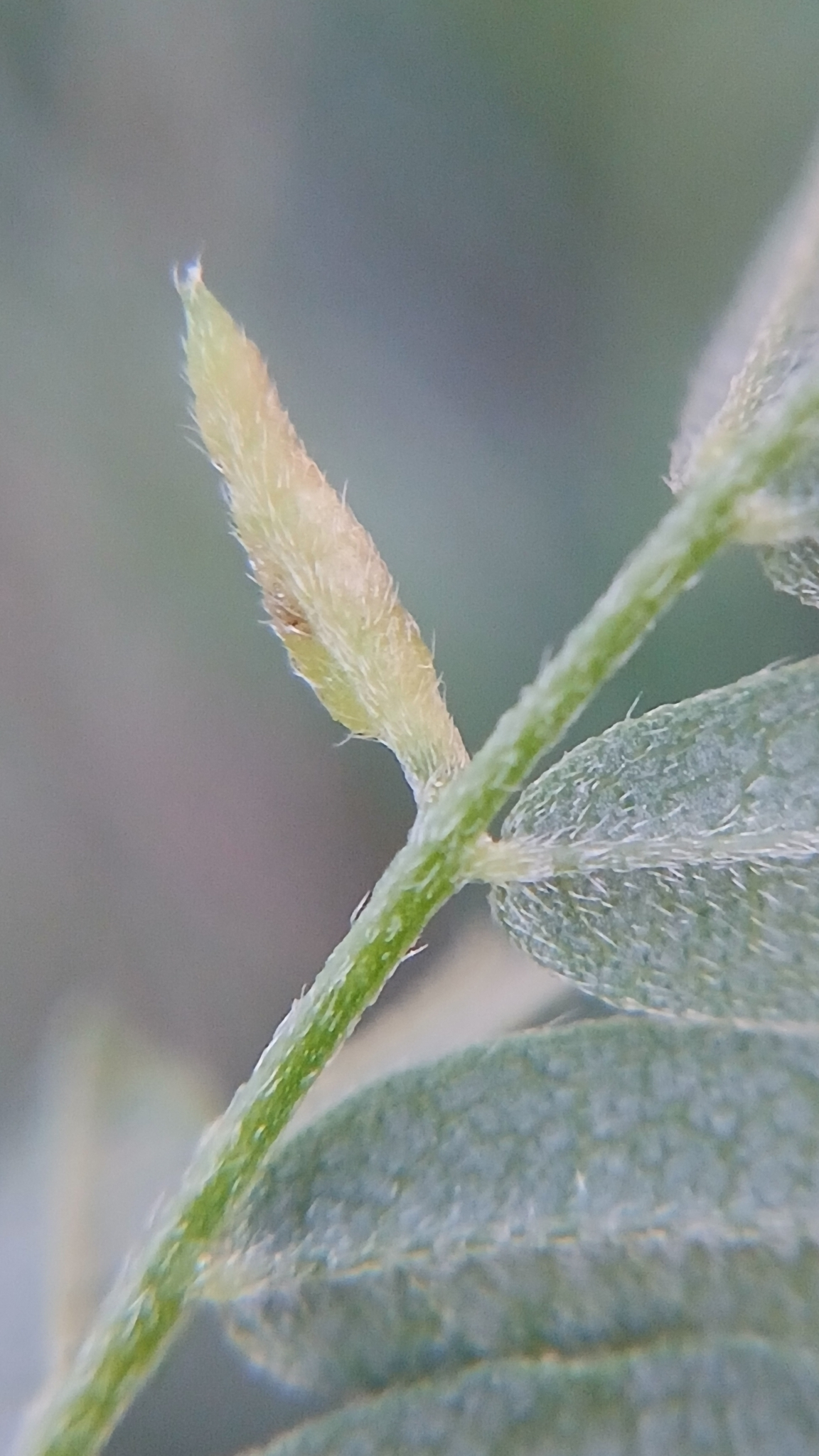
- Gall of Bremiola onobrychidis on Astragalus cicer

Scientific classification
- Kingdom: Animalia
- Phylum: Arthropoda
- Class: Insecta
- Order: Diptera
- Family: Cecidomyiidae
- Subfamily: Cecidomyiinae
- Supertribe: Lasiopteridi
- Tribe: Dasineurini
- Genus: Bremiola; Rübsaamen 1915

= Bremiola =

Genus of flies

Bremiola is a genus of flies in the family Cecidomyiidae. The larvae induce galls on plants in the legume family.

This genus is only known from the Palearctic, mostly from central Asia and eastern Europe. Several species of Chalcidoid wasps are parasitoids of the larvae.

== Taxonomy ==
Bremiola was first described and named by German entomologist Ewald Heinrich Rübsaamen in 1915. It is named after Johann Bremi-Wolf who described the type species - Bremiola onobrychidis (as Cecidomyia onobrychidis) - in 1847 based on a specimen collected in Switzerland. All other species were first described and named by Russian entomologist Zoya Fedotova between 1984 and 1994 based on specimens collected in Kazakhstan.

== Species ==
- Bremiola alpina Fedotova 1990
- Bremiola astragalicola Fedotova 1986
- Bremiola calophacae Fedotova 1986
- Bremiola caraganae Fedotova 1986
- Bremiola caraganicola Fedotova 1990
- Bremiola decipiens Fedotova 1986
- Bremiola deserta Fedotova 1990
- Bremiola halimodendronis Fedotova 1986
- Bremiola hedysarii Fedotova 1986
- Bremiola karatavica Fedotova 1994
- Bremiola onobrychidis (Bremi 1847)
- Bremiola oxytropicola Fedotova 1984
- Bremiola rosulae Fedotova 1993
- Bremiola sphaerophysae Fedotova 1990
- Bremiola tarbagataica Fedotova 1990
