= Trocar =

Medical or veterinary device

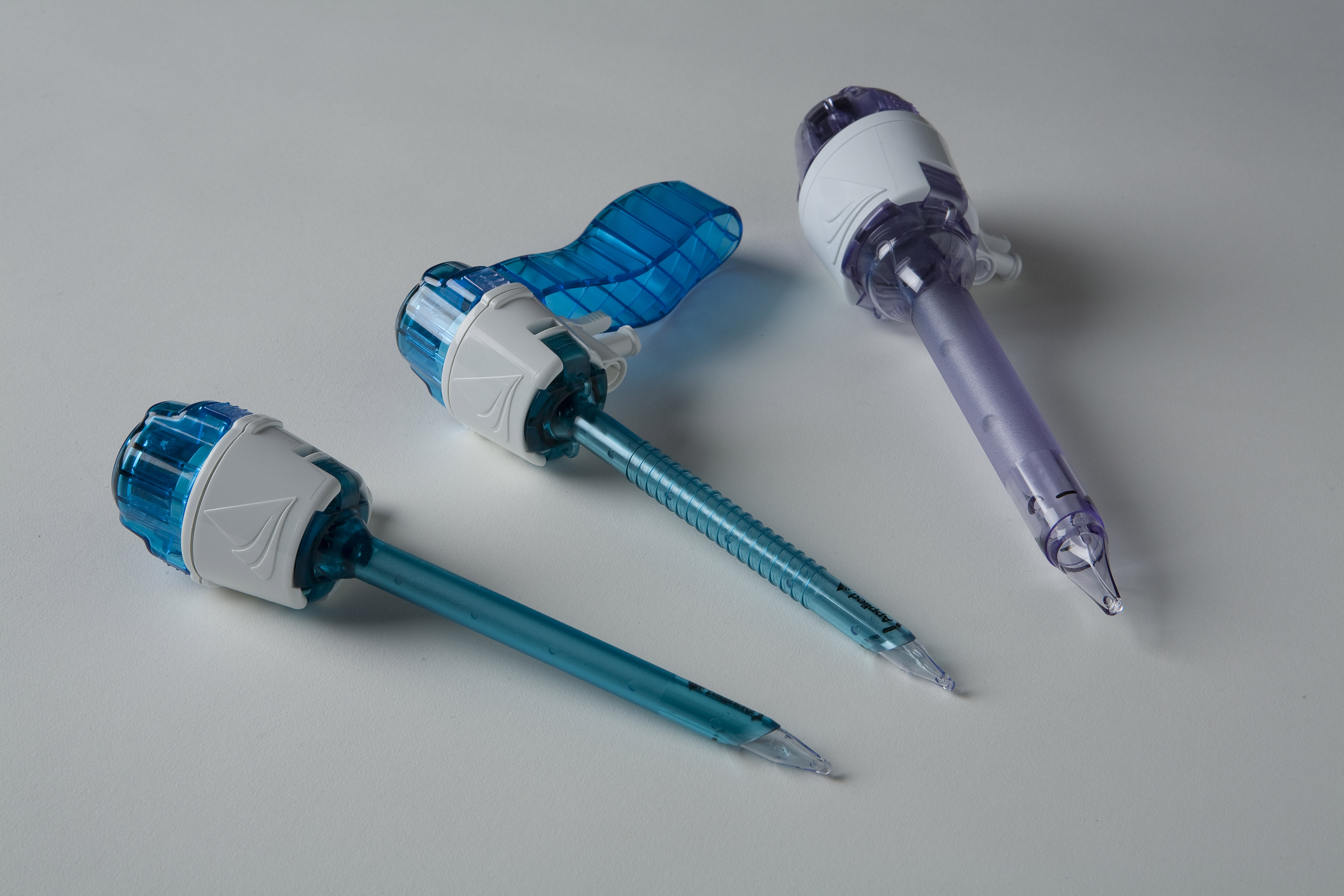
Disposable trocars

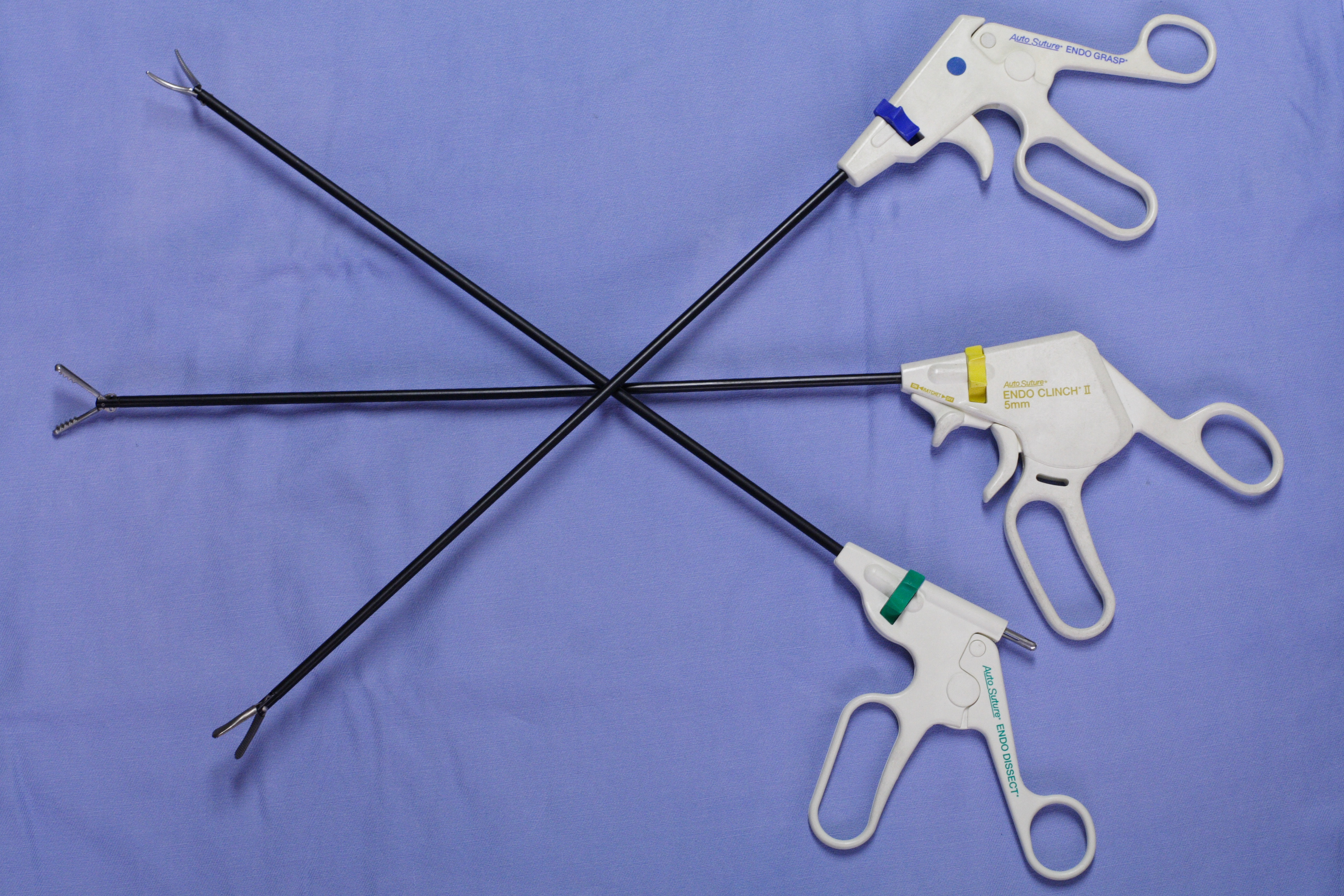
Laparoscopic instruments for insertion through trocars

A trocar (or trochar) is a medical or veterinary device traditionally used in draining or venting procedures, now also (informally termed a port) prominent in minimally invasive surgery. Trocars are typically made up of an obturator (Note: Obturator: the word is Latin, meaning stopper or block. The obturator functions within the cannula, restricting it after initially creating the incision.) (which may be metal or plastic, and with a pointed or tapered tip), within a cannula (essentially a rigid tube), and often with a seal. They allow passive evacuation of excess gas or fluid from organs within the body; some also include a valve mechanism to allow for insufflation. Trocars designed for placement through the chest and abdominal walls during thoracoscopic and laparoscopic surgery function as portals for the subsequent insertion of other endoscopic instruments, such as grasper, scissors, stapler, electrocautery, suction tip, etc.

== Etymology ==
The word trocar, less commonly trochar, comes from French trocart or trocar, itself either from trois-quarts 'three fourths' or from trois carres 'three sides'; in any case referring to the instrument's triangular point. First recorded in the Dictionnaire des Arts et des Sciences, 1694, by Thomas Corneille, younger brother of Pierre Corneille.

== History ==
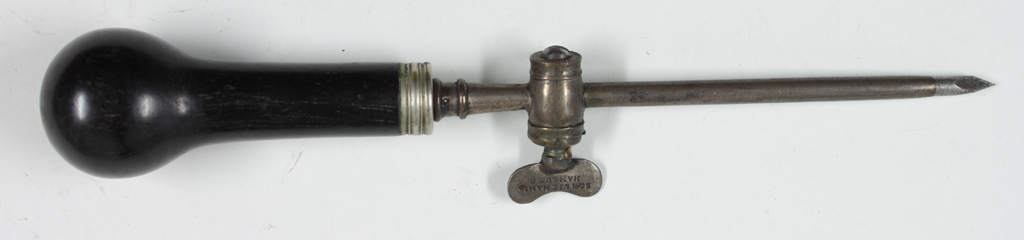
Trocar, c. 1850

Originally, doctors used trocars to relieve pressure build-up of fluids (edema) or gases (bloating). Patents for trocars appeared early in the 19th century, although their use dated back possibly thousands of years. By the middle of the 19th century, trocar-cannulas had become sophisticated, such as Reginald Southey's invention of the Southey tube.

== Applications ==
=== Medical/surgical use ===
Trocars are used in medicine to access and drain collections of fluid such as in a patient with hydrothorax or ascites.

In modern times, surgical trocars are used to perform laparoscopic surgery. They are deployed as a means of introduction for cameras and laparoscopic hand instruments, such as scissors, graspers, etc., to perform surgery hitherto carried out by making a large abdominal incision, something that has revolutionized patient care. Today, surgical trocars are most commonly a single patient use instrument and have graduated from the "three-point" design that gave them their name to either a flat bladed "dilating-tip" product or something that is entirely blade free. This latter design offers greater patient safety due to the technique used to insert them.

Trocar insertion can lead to a perforating puncture wound of an underlying organ resulting in a medical complication. Thus, for instance, a laparoscopic intra-abdominal trocar insertion can lead to bowel injury leading to peritonitis or injury to large blood vessels with hemorrhage.

=== Embalming ===
Trocars are also used near the end of the embalming process to provide drainage of bodily fluids and organs after the vascular replacement of blood with embalming chemicals. Rather than a round tube being inserted, the three-sided knife of the classic trocar would split the outer skin into three "wings" which was then easily sutured closed. In a less obtrusive way, a trocar button can be used in place of a suture. It is attached to a suction hose, usually attached to a water aspirator, but an electric aspirator can also be used. The process of removing gas, fluids, and semi-solids from the body cavities and hollow organs using the trocar is known as aspiration. The instrument is inserted into the body two inches to the (anatomical) left and two inches up from the navel. After the thoracic, abdominal, and pelvic cavities have been aspirated, the embalmer injects cavity fluid into the thoracic, abdominal and pelvic cavities, usually using a smaller trocar attached via a hose connected to a bottle of high-index cavity fluid. The bottle is held upside down in the air so as to let gravity take the cavity fluid through the trocar and into the cavities. There is a small thumb hole attached to the fluid injector to control the flow of liquid. The embalmer moves the trocar in the same manner used when aspirating the cavities. In order to fully and evenly distribute the chemical, it is recommended to use 1 bottle of cavity fluid for the thoracic cavity and 1 for the abdominal cavity.

After cavity embalming has been finished, the puncture is commonly sealed using a small plastic object resembling a screw, called a trocar button.

=== Veterinary use ===
Trocars are widely used by veterinarians not only for draining hydrothorax, ascites, or for introducing instruments in laparoscopic surgery, but for acute animal-specific conditions as well. In cases of ruminal tympany in cattle, a wide-bore trocar may be passed through the skin into the rumen to release trapped gas. In dogs, a similar procedure is often performed for patients presenting with gastric dilatation volvulus in which a wide-bore trocar is passed through the skin into the stomach to immediately decompress the stomach. Depending on the severity of clinical signs on presentation, this is often performed after pain management has been administered but prior to general anaesthesia. Definitive surgical treatment involves anatomical repositioning of the stomach and spleen followed by a right-sided gastropexy. Depending on the severity, partial gastrectomy and/or splenectomy may be indicated if the relevant tissues have necrosed due to ischemia caused by torsion/avulsion of the supplying vasculature.

== In popular culture ==
In the movie Far from the Madding Crowd (1967) Gabriel Oak, played by Alan Bates, uses a trocar to aspirate abdominal gasses from Bathsheba Everdene's herd of sheep which had strayed into a field of clover and were bloated.

In the movie True Lies, Arnold Schwarzenegger's character, having picked the lock on his handcuffs, uses a Patterson trocar to kill his guard prior to breaking the neck of his torturer.

== General and cited references ==
- Janet Amundson Romich. An illustrated guide to veterinary medical terminology, Volume 1
- Mayer, Robert (2006). Embalming: History, Theory, and Practice (4th ed.). McGraw-Hill. ISBN 0-07-143950-1.
