= Rübsaamen =

Rübsaamen is a German surname. Notable people with the surname include:

- Dieter Rübsaamen (born 1937), German artist
- Ewald Heinrich Rübsaamen (1857–1919), German teacher, artist, and entomologist
