= Rabdophaga terminalis =

Scientific classification
- Kingdom: Animalia
- Phylum: Arthropoda
- Clade: Pancrustacea
- Class: Insecta
- Order: Diptera
- Family: Cecidomyiidae
- Genus: Rabdophaga
- Species: R. terminalis

Binomial name
- Rabdophaga terminalis (Loew, 1850)

Synonyms
- Dasineura terminalis Rabdophaga saligna (Hardy, 1950); Cecidomyia saligna Hardy, 1850

Species of fly

Rabdophaga strobilina is a gall midge which forms galls on the buds of some species of willow (Salix species). It was first described by Hermann Loew in 1850.

== Description ==
The gall is green, reddish, later black but never hairy. The leaves of the terminal bud are slightly thickened, sometimes crinkled and curled into an elongate gall, which can be hidden by older leaves. Inside the gall is an elongate cavity with orange or reddish larvae numbering from one to forty.

It is uncertain whether white larvae are the young larvae of R. terminalis or inquilines, Macrolabis saliceti and/or R. strobilina.

The gall has been found on the following species:

- Salix alba – white willow
- Salix babylonica – Babylon willow
- Salix caesia
- Salix excelsa
- Salix × fragilis – crack willow
- Salix pentandra – bay willow
- Salix purpurea – purple willow
- Salix triandra – almond willow
- Salix viminalis – osier
- Salix viridis

== Distribution ==
The insect or gall has been found in Belgium and the United Kingdom.
