= Canine gastropexy =

Surgical procedure for dogs

Canine gastropexy is a veterinary surgical procedure where in the stomach is surgically anchored to the inner wall of the abdomen, it is performed most commonly in large breed dogs to prevent gastric dilatation volvulus (GDV), commonly known as canine bloat.

The word gastropexy comes from two Greek roots: gaster, meaning "stomach," and pexis, meaning "fixation" or "fastening". Gastropexies can be performed in the high-risk breeds as a preventive measure of the bloat i.e. Prophylactic Gastropexy or as a preventive procedure in dogs who are treated for GDV to avoid its recurrence called Curative Gastropexy.

GDV is a life-threatening condition in which the stomach flips over and expands, trapping air and gases in the stomach. Circulation to the stomach and spleen is subsequently interrupted, resulting in shock which can be fatal.

In gastropexy, the stomach is tacked to the right side of the abdominal wall, so it cannot shift or twist. The procedure can be conducted laparoscopically.

Gastropexy is an effective preventive against death from GDV in large dogs. In studies of dogs treated for GDV, of those with gastropexy, only 4.3% had a re-occurrence of GDV, compared to 54.5% of those dogs that did not have a gastropexy.

== See also ==
- Gastropexy
