= Shen Hu =

Chinese search and rescue dog

- Other name: Tiger Shen
- Born: February 9, 2006
- Died: September 29, 2019

Shen Hu (Chinese: 沈虎; 2006 – September 29, 2019), also known as Tiger Shen, was a search and rescue dog in Mainland China, renowned for its search and rescue work during the Wenchuan earthquake. It was the last Wenchuan earthquake rescue dog.

In the Wenchuan earthquake, 3-year-old military dog Shen Hu rescued 15 survivors from the rubble and aftershocks.

== Biography ==
Shen Hu was born in Shenyang Police Dog Base on February 9, 2006. Its breed belonged to the German Shepherd. At the end of the same year, it was bought by the Nanjing Fire Bureau and was named "Little Black" by the first trainer. In November 2010, the trainer Shen Peng took over it and changed it to its current name.

In December 2016, Shen Hu was discharged from the army. In April 2019, it had a stroke and was resuscitated for a long time before it could recover. It died on September 29, 2019, due to sudden gastric torsion.

On May 12, 2020, the Nanjing Fire Brigade built a statue of Shen Hu, a search and rescue dog, who had participated in the Wenchuan earthquake rescue.
