= Jack Grealish =

English footballer (born 1995)

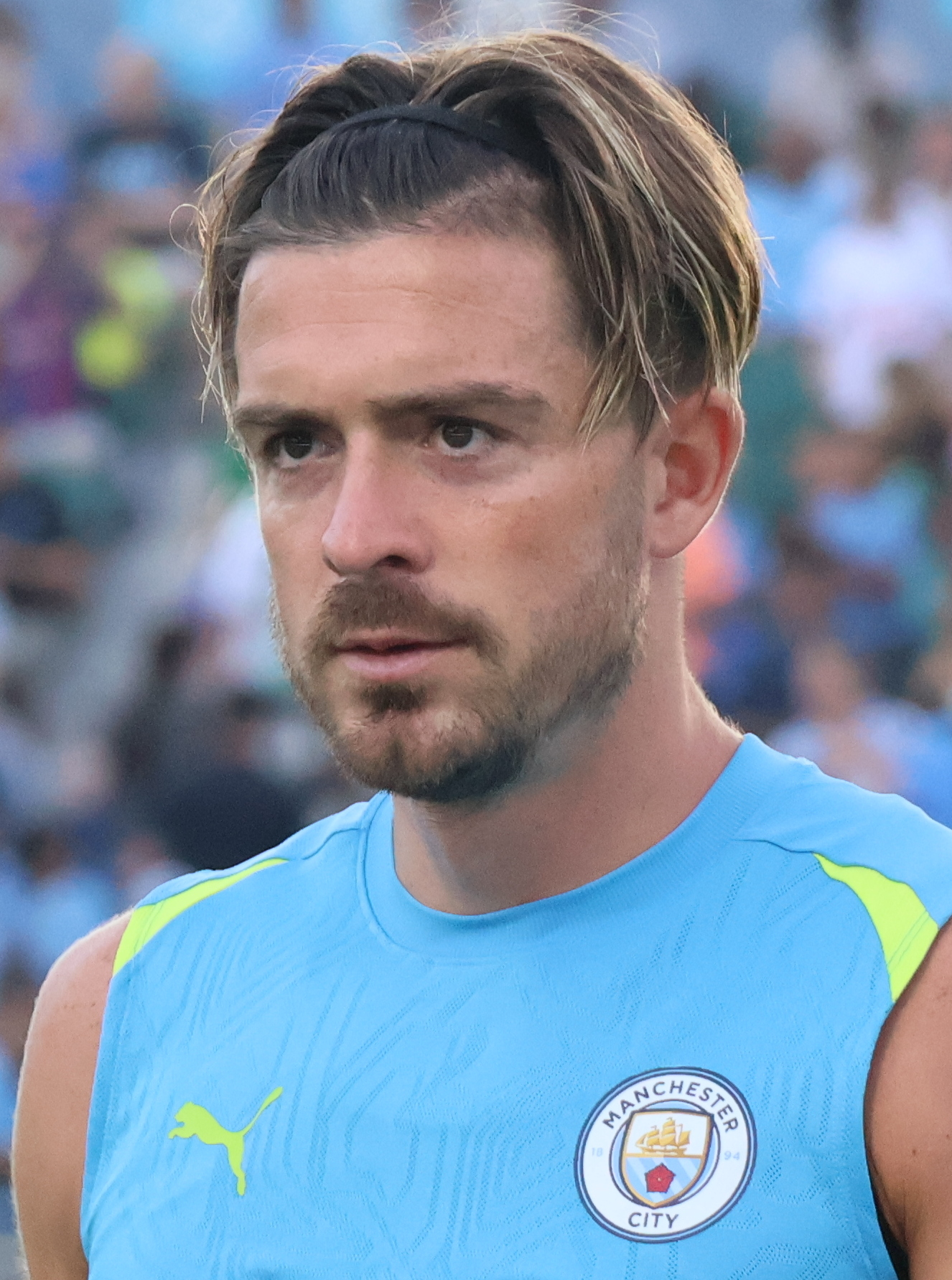
- Grealish in 2024

Personal information
- Full name: Jack Peter Grealish
- Date of birth: 10 September 1995 (age 31)
- Place of birth: Birmingham, England
- Height: 5 ft 11 in (1.80 m)
- Position: Winger

Team information
- Current team: Everton (on loan from Manchester City)
- Number: 10

Youth career
- 2001–2002: Highgate United
- 2002–2013: Aston Villa

Senior career*
Years	Team	Apps	(Gls)
2013–2021	Aston Villa	185	(28)
2013–2014	→ Notts County (loan)	37	(5)
2021–	Manchester City	95	(12)
2025–2026	→ Everton (loan)	20	(2)
2026–	→ Everton (loan)	5	(0)

International career
2011–2012	Republic of Ireland U17	7	(3)
2012–2013	Republic of Ireland U18	6	(2)
2013–2014	Republic of Ireland U21	6	(1)
2016–2017	England U21	7	(2)
2020–2024	England	39	(4)
Medal record
Men's football
Representing England
UEFA European Championship
Runner-up	2020 Europe
- * Club domestic league appearances and goals as of 18:27, 17 October 2026 (UTC)

Jack Peter Grealish (born 10 September 1995) is an English professional footballer who plays as a winger for Premier League club Everton, on loan from Manchester City. Known for his dribbling and playmaking ability, Grealish was considered amongst the best wingers in the world during his prime. He is also regarded as one of the most popular and marketable athletes in England.

Grealish joined Aston Villa at the age of six, and made his debut for the club in May 2014, following a loan at Notts County, becoming club captain in 2019. In 2021, Grealish was signed by Manchester City in a transfer deal worth £100 million, making him at the time, the most expensive British player ever. In his first season with the club, he won a Premier League title, before securing a continental treble in his second campaign. After falling out of favour at City, Grealish was loaned to Everton in 2025, and again in 2026.

Born in England with Irish ancestry, Grealish was eligible to represent either England or the Republic of Ireland internationally. He was capped by the Republic of Ireland up to under-21 level before confirming his decision to play for England in April 2016. Grealish played for the England under-21s for the first time in May 2016, winning the 2016 Toulon Tournament. He represented the senior side at UEFA Euro 2020 and the 2022 FIFA World Cup.

== Early life ==
Jack Peter Grealish was born on 10 September 1995 in Birmingham, West Midlands, and raised in nearby Solihull. He attended Our Lady of Compassion Roman Catholic Primary School and St Peter's Roman Catholic Secondary School in Blossomfield, Solihull.

Grealish is of Irish descent, through his maternal grandfather from County Dublin, his paternal grandfather from Gort, County Galway, and his paternal grandmother from Sneem, County Kerry. Influenced by his Irish heritage, Grealish played Gaelic football for John Mitchel's Hurling and Camogie Club of Warwickshire GAA between the ages of 10 and 14. He competed against former Aston Villa and current Newcastle United defender Aoife Mannion, a school classmate of his, at Gaelic football.

Grealish's younger brother, Keelan, died of sudden infant death syndrome (SIDS) in April 2000 at the age of nine months.

== Club career ==
=== Aston Villa ===
==== Early career ====
Having started at Highgate United, Aston Villa fan Grealish joined the club as a six-year-old. At the age of 16, he was named as an unused substitute in a 4–2 home Premier League defeat against Chelsea on 31 March 2012. Grealish was part of the club's under-19 team that won the 2012–13 NextGen Series.

==== 2013–2014: Loan to Notts County ====
On 13 September 2013, Grealish joined League One club Notts County on a youth loan until 13 January 2014. The 18-year-old made his professional debut the following day, coming on as a 59th-minute substitute for David Bell in a 3–1 away defeat to Milton Keynes Dons. On 7 December, he scored his first career goal, beating three defenders to score the last goal in a 3–1 win over Gillingham at Meadow Lane, and followed this a week later by opening a 4–0 victory at Colchester United. Grealish extended his loan with Notts County on 17 January 2014 until the end of the season. He ended his loan with five goals and seven assists in 38 appearances.

==== 2014–2016: Development and maturation ====
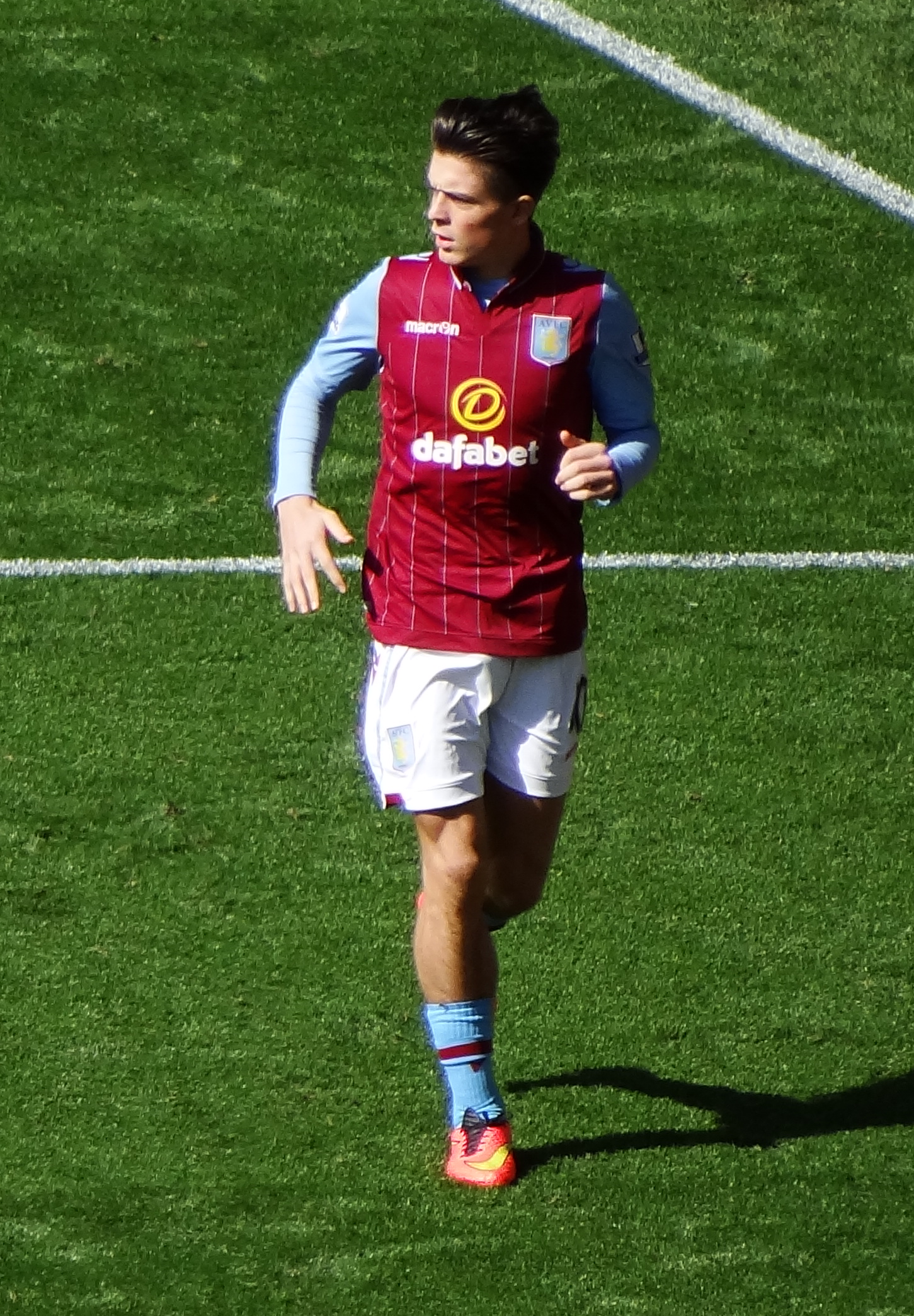
Grealish playing for Aston Villa in 2014

Following his loan with Notts County, Grealish returned to Aston Villa and made his club debut on 7 May 2014, coming on as an 88th-minute substitute for Ryan Bertrand in a 4–0 away defeat to Manchester City in the Premier League. Grealish made his first start in a Football League Cup third round tie on 27 August against Leyton Orient at Villa Park, which his team lost 1–0. He played the full 90 minutes. With his contract due to expire in the summer of 2015, he was offered a new four-year deal by the club in September 2014. On 14 October, Grealish signed a new four-year contract with Aston Villa.

On 7 March 2015, in the sixth round of the FA Cup, a 2–0 home win over West Bromwich Albion, Grealish replaced Charles N'Zogbia after 74 minutes, and was sent off for a second booking for diving in added time. On 7 April, Grealish started his first match for Aston Villa in the Premier League, a 3–3 home draw against Queens Park Rangers in which his performance was highly praised. On 18 April, in the FA Cup semi-final against Liverpool at Wembley Stadium, Grealish played a part in both of Villa's goals including assisting Fabian Delph's winner, as they came from behind to advance to the final. On 30 May, Grealish played for the entirety of the 2015 FA Cup final at Wembley Stadium, as Villa lost 4–0 to Arsenal.

In April 2015, Grealish was warned by Aston Villa manager Tim Sherwood after The Sun published images showing him allegedly inhaling nitrous oxide for recreational purposes. Sherwood said that "We can't condone that behaviour. He is now in a responsible position as a professional footballer, he's got to make sure it won't happen again". Sherwood later said in May 2015 that Grealish was learning from his friendship with his midfield partner, the experienced Joe Cole. Sherwood considered Cole a role model for Grealish when concealing his private life, as he "didn't read too much about Joe being on the front pages".

Grealish scored his first goal for Villa on 13 September 2015, a 20-yard shot to open the scoring away to Leicester City; however, his team lost 3–2. In November, he chose to stay in North West England and go clubbing after Villa's 4–0 loss to Everton. New manager Rémi Garde punished him for this decision by making Grealish train with the under-21 team, and stated that "You have to behave as a professional and it was not the case this time for Jack". He returned to full training on 8 December. On 7 January 2016, Leeds United head coach Steve Evans said that Villa had rejected an enquiry to take Grealish on loan.

Villa finished the season in last place, ending their status as Premier League ever-presents. Grealish played 16 matches, all defeats, breaking a record for worst season previously held by Sunderland's Sean Thornton, who lost in all 11 of his appearances in 2002–03.

==== 2016–2019: Injuries and regained form ====
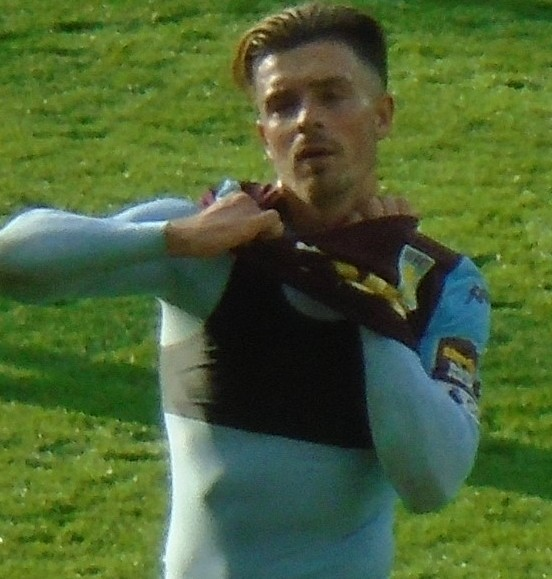
Grealish with Aston Villa in 2019

On 7 September, Grealish signed a new four-year contract with Villa until 2020. Later that month, the club opened an internal disciplinary investigation after reports that the player was at a party at a Birmingham hotel which had to be shut down by the police in the early morning. In response, owner Tony Xia wrote on Twitter that Grealish had to focus on and off the pitch, and associate with the right people. In October, he was suspended for three matches after accepting a charge of violent conduct following a stamp on Conor Coady in Villa's 1–1 draw with Wolverhampton Wanderers.

On 29 July 2017, during a pre-season friendly against Watford, while challenging for a ball in the air near the Watford box, the 21-year-old collided with Watford midfielder Tom Cleverley. The collision caused him to be rushed to the Heartlands Hospital in Birmingham where he went through surgery. It was later revealed that he had been elbowed by Cleverley, causing a ruptured kidney, and leaving him sidelined for three months as he recovered before making his return as a second-half substitute for Glenn Whelan in a 2–1 home defeat to Sheffield Wednesday on 4 November. In an interview with the Daily Mirror in May 2018, he revealed that the injury had been life-threatening.

In the summer of 2018, following Villa's loss in the play-off final to Fulham which saw them miss out on promotion to the Premier League, Grealish was linked with a move to Tottenham Hotspur but it failed and he remained at the club.

On 24 September, Grealish signed a new five-year contract with Villa until 2023.

0n 7 December, Grealish suffered a shin injury during a 2–2 draw away to West Bromwich Albion which saw him ruled out for three months. After former captain John Terry departed the club and club captain James Chester and vice-captain Alan Hutton suffered injuries, Grealish was given the captaincy following his return from injury in March 2019 which he retained for the remainder of the season. On 22 April 2019, the team amassed a club record 10 consecutive league wins following a 1–0 home victory over Millwall, in the second of which Grealish was punched from behind by a pitch invader during the Second City derby match away to Birmingham City. Later in the second half, Grealish scored to give Villa a 1–0 victory. Paul Mitchell, 27, from Rubery, was sent to prison for 14 weeks for pitch encroachment and assault. This form granted Villa a place in the play-offs where victories over West Bromwich Albion over two semi-final legs via a penalty shootout and Derby County in the final gained them promotion to the Premier League after an absence of three years.

==== 2019–2021: Club captaincy, talisman and individual success ====
Following Aston Villa's return to the Premier League, with Chester still injured and the departure of Hutton, Grealish was announced as the new club captain.

Grealish's first goal of the 2019–20 season came in the second round of the 2019–20 EFL Cup against Crewe Alexandra on 27 August 2019. His first Premier League goal of Aston Villa's return season came on 5 October, netting his side's third goal in a 5–1 away win over Norwich City. The result lifted the club out of the bottom three and leapfrogged their opponents in the Premier League table.

In March 2020, the 2019-20 Premier League season was suspended, due to the COVID-19 pandemic in the United Kingdom. During that enforced break, it was revealed that Grealish had violated government guidance to stay home. He accepted that his actions were "wrong and entirely unnecessary" and was fined by the club.

Grealish was fouled 167 times across the season; this was the most fouls won by a player in a single Premier League campaign, with Grealish passing the record with over eight matches remaining in the season. On 26 July 2020, he scored on the final day, as Aston Villa clinched survival in the Premier League with a 1–1 draw against West Ham United, as their relegation rivals Watford lost 3–2 to Arsenal (whilst even a draw wouldn't have been enough because of their inferior goal difference). At the club's end of season awards, Grealish was voted the Villa's Player of the Season by both the supporters and his fellow players. He also finished the season as the club's leading goalscorer with eight goals in the Premier League and 10 in all competitions.

On 15 September, Grealish signed a new five-year contract with Villa until 2025. He scored his first league goal of the campaign in Villa's second match on 28 September; the first goal in a 3–0 win at newly promoted Fulham. On 4 October, he scored twice and provided three assists in a 7–2 home victory over Liverpool. It was Liverpool's heaviest defeat in 57 years and was the first time in Premier League history that a reigning champion had conceded seven goals in a single match. It took almost a month for Grealish to score again, when he netted a 97th-minute goal against Southampton, although it was not enough as Villa lost 4–3.

=== Manchester City ===
==== 2021–2022: Transfer and emergence ====
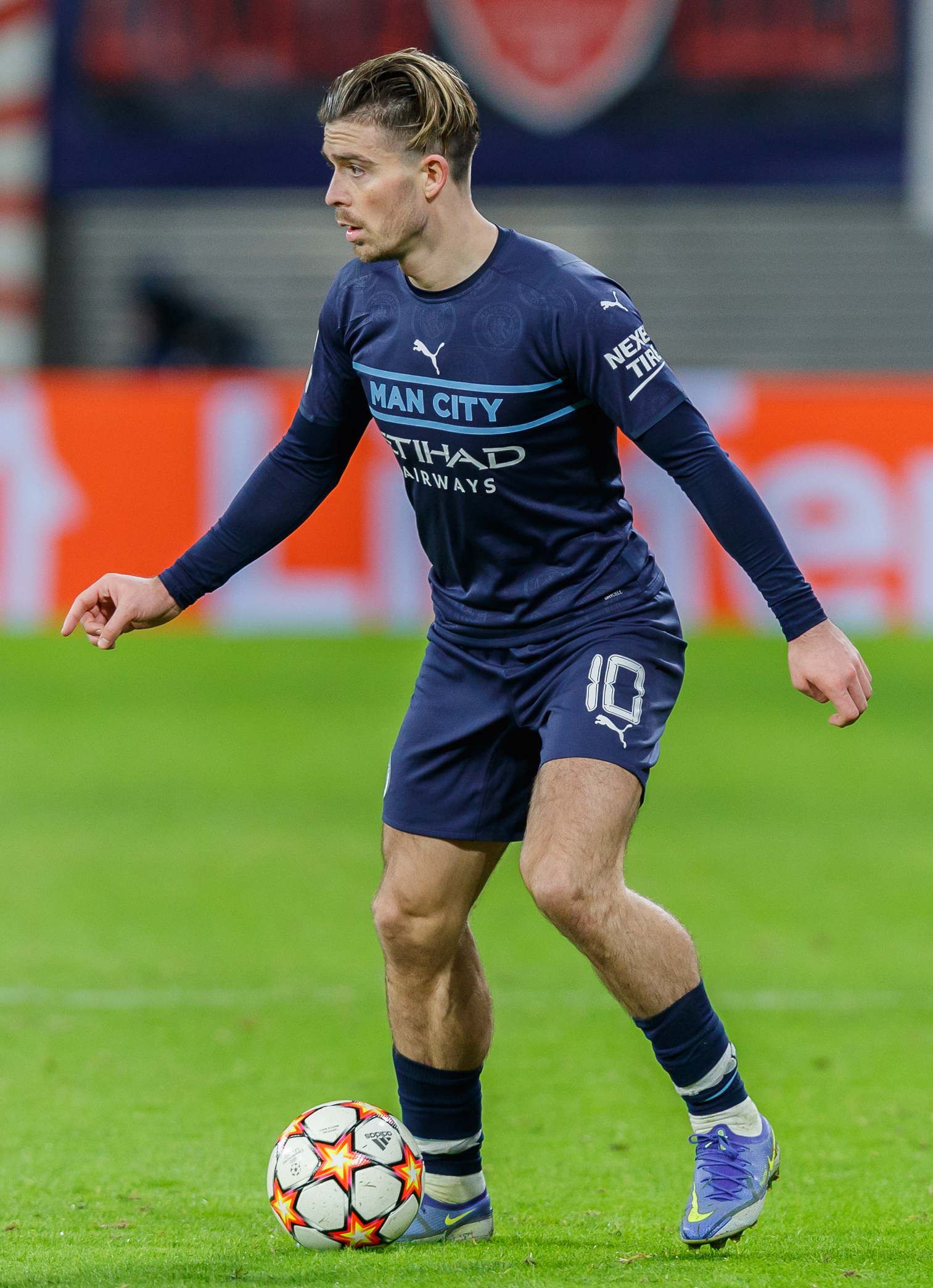
Grealish playing for Manchester City in 2021

On 5 August 2021, Manchester City announced that they had signed Grealish on a six-year contract that would run until June 2027. It was reported by numerous outlets that the transfer fee paid to Aston Villa was for the amount of £100 million, which at the time constituted the most expensive transfer of an English player ever, as well as the highest fee ever paid by a British club. Grealish was given the number 10 shirt by the team which had previously been worn by striker Sergio Agüero, who departed from City the month prior after ten seasons with the team. Grealish made his debut for City in a 1–0 defeat against Tottenham Hotspur on the first matchday of the 2021–22 Premier League. On 21 August, he scored his first goal for the club in a 5–0 win over Norwich City. Grealish would score on his UEFA Champions League debut on 15 September, putting City 4–2 up in an eventual 6–3 group stage victory against RB Leipzig. He also assisted Nathan Aké's goal for City's opener. In December 2021, Grealish and teammate Phil Foden were dropped for a game against Newcastle after a nightclub visit.

Although he finished the campaign with a Premier League title, Grealish admitted difficulties in his debut season at Manchester City, stating that adapting to the club's style of play had been "much more difficult" than he imagined, despite the fact that City manager Pep Guardiola believed he was successfully fulfilling his role. Grealish was later defended from his critics by his teammate Kevin De Bruyne, who voiced his belief that Grealish was an easy target for criticism because of the media spotlight on English players. Moreover, İlkay Gündoğan claimed that Grealish was "so misunderstood by some of the media".

==== 2022–2023: Breakthrough and continental treble ====
On 17 September 2022, Grealish scored his first goal of the 2022–23 season in an away victory against Wolverhampton Wanderers, coming after just 55 seconds. Grealish netted the opener of City's eventual 2–1 derby defeat against Manchester United on 14 January 2023. On 15 February, he scored in a 3–1 away victory against league leaders Arsenal to help City overtake them in the Premier League title race. Grealish assisted Riyad Mahrez for City's goal against RB Leipzig in the 2022–23 Champions League round of 16 first leg on 22 February 2023, and was later lauded as "impossible to play against" by both Rio Ferdinand and Owen Hargreaves. Grealish was highly commended for his performance against Liverpool on 1 April, in which Manchester City won 4–1 after going a goal behind; in the match, he scored and also provided an assist for Julián Álvarez. Following a 1–1 draw away to Real Madrid in the first leg of the Champions League semi-finals, it was calculated at this point that Grealish had created 35 chances in that season's Champions League alone; this was the most on record by an English player in a single season. In the return leg, Grealish was a standout performer as City beat Madrid 4–0 at home, being described by Jamie Jackson of The Guardian as "scintillating".

On 20 May 2023, Grealish won his second consecutive Premier League title after Arsenal lost 1–0 to Nottingham Forest. Manchester City lifted the trophy the following day. On 3 June, Grealish started in City's victory against Manchester United in the final of the FA Cup. Grealish later spoke of how the achievement was the "stuff you dream of when you're a little kid". One week later, he played the entirety of his side's Champions League final against Inter Milan as Manchester City sealed their first and only continental treble after winning with a score-line of 1–0. In a post-match interview, Grealish said the achievement was "what you work your whole life for" and called his manager Guardiola a "genius". Grealish would go on to be seen, after a day and night of partying, stumbling off of a plane, apparently drunk and lacking sleep. He was later seen celebrating, still in full kit, just hours before Manchester City's treble parade. During this parade, Grealish was also positively identified by the media as enjoying himself greatly. Following Manchester City's highly successful 2022–23 season, it was suggested that Grealish could become a potential candidate for the Ballon d'Or. Grealish was also praised by critics for his large contribution to Manchester City's success. Neil Johnston of BBC Sport commented that Grealish had become "almost undroppable for the big games". Grealish himself commented that he now felt "like one of the main players [of Manchester City]" and that he was at a stage whereby he was "the fittest… [he had ever] been".

==== 2023–2025: UEFA Super Cup victory and injury setbacks ====
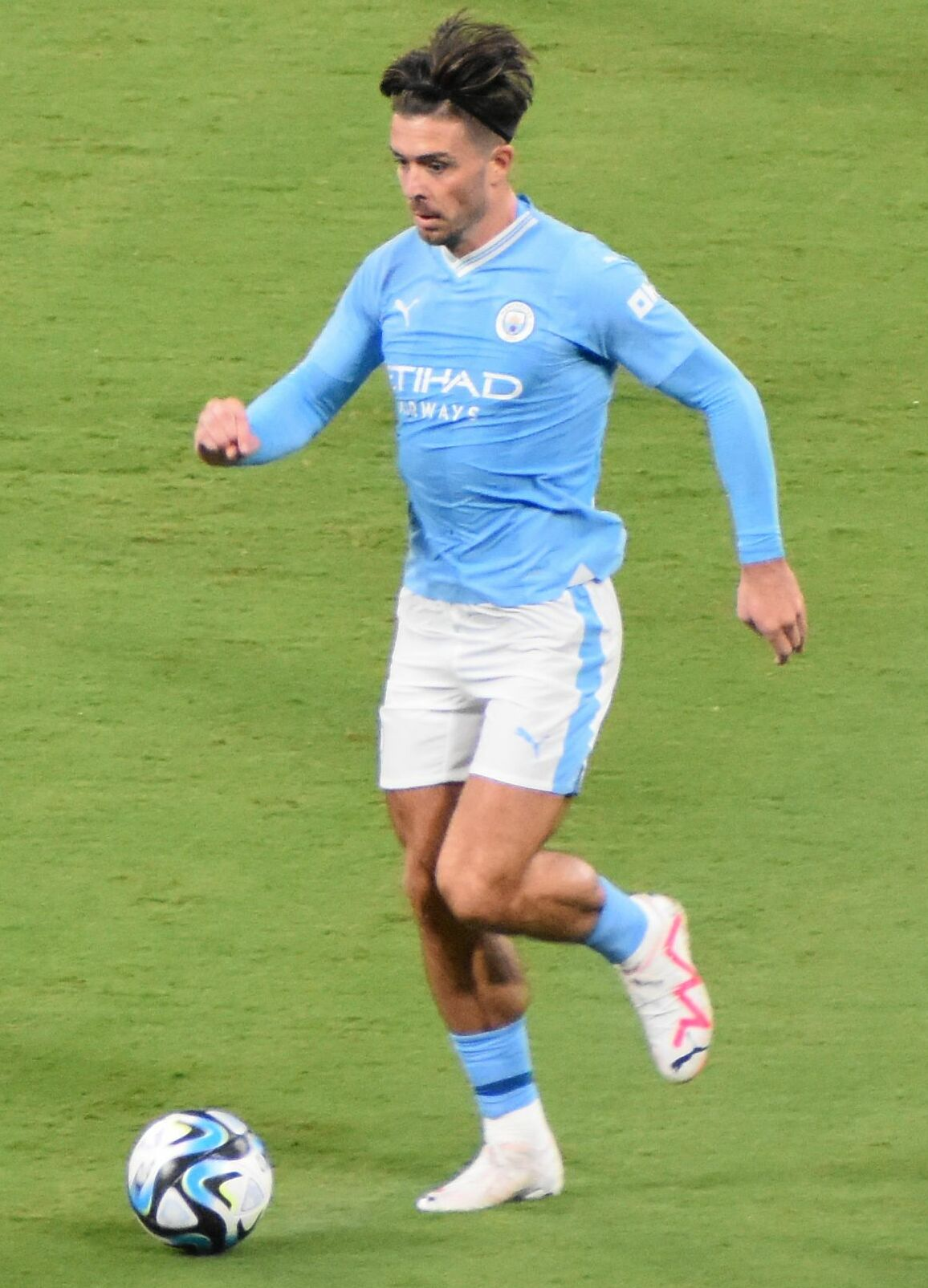
Grealish playing for Manchester City in 2023

On 16 August 2023, Grealish started in Manchester City's 2023 UEFA Super Cup victory over Sevilla, converting his penalty in the shoot-out after the match had finished 1–1 following regulation time. On 27 August, Grealish was unavailable due to a dead leg and, proceeding this, endured a run of games on the bench. On 25 October, Grealish was selected in the starting line-up for Manchester City's game against Young Boys, with Pep Guardiola stating that he did not "have a piece of doubt about Jack". On 29 October, Grealish returned to Manchester City's regular Premier League starting XI in the Manchester derby and was highly praised for his performance in the match.

On 11 January 2025, Grealish scored his first club goal in over a year, a penalty in an 8–0 home victory against Salford City in the FA Cup third round. Later that month, on 22 January, he netted his first UEFA Champions League goal since the 2021–22 season, opening the scoring for Manchester City in a 4–2 away defeat to Paris Saint-Germain during the league phase. On 2 April 2025, he scored his first and only Premier League goal of the 2024–25 season, opening the scoring in a 2–0 victory over Leicester City. However, he was ultimately left out of the club's squad for the 2025 FIFA Club World Cup.

==== 2025–present: Loans to Everton ====
On 12 August 2025, Grealish was loaned out to fellow Premier League club Everton for the 2025–26 season. On 18 August, he made his debut for the club in a 1–0 away defeat to Leeds United in their first game of the Premier League season, coming on as a 71st-minute substitute for Tim Iroegbunam. On 24 August, during his first start for the club, Grealish assisted both goals in a 2–0 victory over Brighton & Hove Albion in Everton's first match at Hill Dickinson Stadium, the first being the inaugural competitive assist in the stadium's history. On 30 August, he recorded two more assists in a 3–2 away win against Wolverhampton Wanderers. On 12 September, Grealish received the Player of the Month award for the first time in his career. He earned this award through the performances throughout August in which he provided four assists. On 5 October, Grealish scored his first goal for Everton when he converted a deflected shot from Beto against Crystal Palace. The goal, scored in injury time, secured a 2–1 comeback win and broke Crystal Palace's 19-match unbeaten run. On 2 December 2025, Grealish scored his second Premier League goal for Everton, netting the winner in a 1–0 victory over AFC Bournemouth.

Following the conclusion of his loan spell at Everton, Grealish returned to Manchester City during the summer of 2026. On 16 August, he played the entire second half of City's 3–0 defeat to Arsenal in the 2026 FA Community Shield. Grealish subsequently made his first Premier League appearance for City since returning, replacing Phil Foden in the 82nd minute of a 2–1 victory over Bournemouth in the club's opening match of the 2026–27 Premier League season.

On 1 September 2026, Grealish rejoined Everton on a season-long loan.

== International career ==
=== Republic of Ireland ===
While playing in Irish youth teams, England were known to have been pursuing him, even naming him in their under-17 team in 2011 at the age of 15 – an invitation he declined. After being left off the Republic of Ireland under-21 team for three qualifiers in October 2012, the English FA made an approach for him to switch. Grealish made his under-21 debut for the Republic of Ireland as a late substitute against the Faroe Islands in August 2013. In 2013, Grealish reaffirmed his desire to continue representing Ireland. In August 2014, Grealish was again named to the Republic of Ireland under-21 squad. It was initially reported that he would decline the call up to the under-21s due to being undecided over his international future, however Grealish did turn out for the Republic of Ireland in a 2–0 loss against Germany. It later emerged that Grealish had actually declined a call-up to the senior Irish team after talks with Martin O'Neill.

In October 2014, Grealish pulled out of a Republic of Ireland under-21 squad for a game against Norway to play in a behind closed doors friendly for his club Aston Villa and England under-21 manager Gareth Southgate confirmed that the Football Association were monitoring the player's situation. Reports emerged on 17 October that Grealish had declared for Ireland and would make his senior debut the next month but this was denied by the player. Grealish was awarded the Under-21 player of the year by the Football Association of Ireland in March 2015 where he announced that he had taken a break from youth internationals over the past year to focus on breaking into the Aston Villa first team and that he expected to be back playing for Ireland in the near future. In May 2015, O'Neill confirmed that Grealish had turned down another call-up to the Irish senior squad, this time for a friendly against England and a European Championship qualifier against Scotland. England manager Roy Hodgson disclosed that although he had been in contact with Grealish, he had chosen not to include him in their squad to face Ireland in case of a backlash. In August 2015, Hodgson met with Grealish to discuss his future.

=== England ===
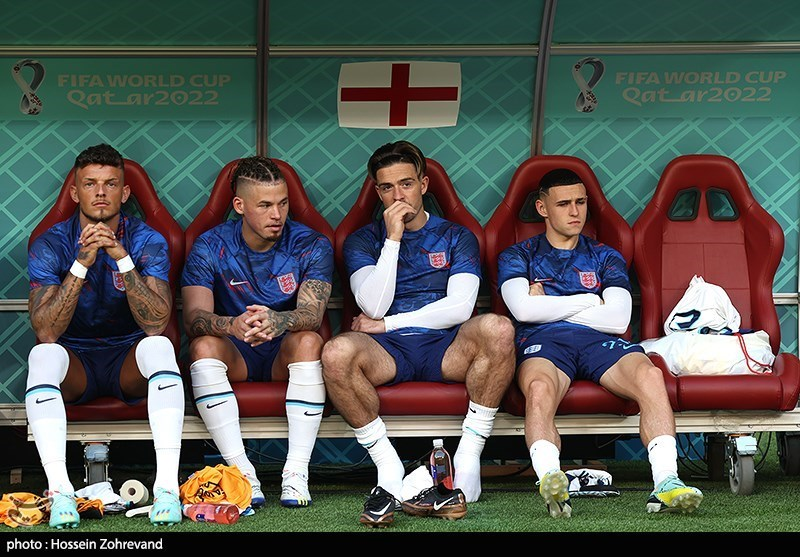
Grealish (second from right) with England at the 2022 World Cup

On 28 September 2015, Grealish confirmed that he had decided to represent England at international level. The 20-year-old made his debut for England under-21s on 19 May 2016 as a 72nd-minute substitute for Ruben Loftus-Cheek in a 1–0 win over Portugal at the Toulon Tournament. On his first start four days later he scored twice in the first half of a 7–1 win over Guinea. England went on to win the tournament for the first time since 1994. Grealish was named in the squad for England under-21 at the 2017 UEFA European Under-21 Championship. From 2016 to 2017, he made seven appearances for the under-21s, scoring two goals.

On 31 August 2020, for the first time, Grealish was called up to the senior England squad for the UEFA Nations League fixtures against Iceland and Denmark. On 8 September, he made his senior debut as a 76th-minute substitute in a 0–0 draw against Denmark. On 1 June 2021, Grealish was named in the 26-man squad for the newly rescheduled UEFA Euro 2020. On 29 June, in the Round of 16 match against Germany, Grealish was introduced as a substitute in the 68th minute and contributed directly to both goals in a 2–0 win, playing in Luke Shaw to assist Raheem Sterling, and crossing for Harry Kane to head in late in the match. On 9 October 2021, Grealish scored his first international goal after being introduced as a substitute in the 73rd minute during England's 2022 FIFA World Cup qualification match against Andorra. During England's first match of the 2022 FIFA World Cup on 21 November 2022 against Iran, Grealish scored his second international goal and England's sixth of the match. Upon scoring, Grealish celebrated by waving his arms about. It was later revealed that this celebration was enacted by Grealish as a young Manchester City fan with cerebral palsy named Finlay had asked him to. The gesture led to Grealish being commended by the media.

Having not been a regular player in the England side until his breakthrough at Manchester City, Grealish was previously described as 'England's enigma'. After he was initially named in England's provisional squad for UEFA Euro 2024, Grealish missed out on the final 26-man squad.

Grealish has not been picked for the England national team since 2024.

== Style of play ==
=== Analysis ===
A technically gifted player, Grealish plays as a winger (normally on the left flank, a position which allows him to cut inside onto his stronger right foot) or attacking midfielder, and has been noted for his ability to run and dribble past defenders. Bryan Jones, Aston Villa's former academy director, likened his playing style to that of Nottingham Forest winger John Robertson, citing his "ability to just ghost past people". During his time with Manchester City, he was occasionally also used in a central attacking role as a false 9 by manager Pep Guardiola. When writing for The Athletic in 2019, sports journalist Michael Cox described Grealish as an "old-school player", due to his playing style. Grealish has also been praised for his professionalism by those who have managed him, with Dean Smith calling him "a really good professional" and Pep Guardiola commenting in 2023 that he was "impressed with how professional" he was.

Despite not being gifted with exceptional speed, he is an agile player who possesses quick foot-work, a good change of pace, and excellent balance on the ball, as a result of his low centre of gravity. As a consequence of his nimble movement, Grealish has notably been on the receiving end of heavier, more physical challenges from opposing players. Shaun Derry, his manager at Notts County, highlighted this, following fixtures against Sheffield United and Stevenage in early 2014 and called for more official protection. In a 2014 match for Aston Villa against Hull City at Villa Park, a number of fouls committed against Grealish resulted in three Hull players receiving yellow cards within just a 15-minute period.

Grealish wears child-sized shin pads whilst playing, in order to maintain his ability to control the ball effectively. He wears his football socks rolled down due to superstition, which has led to referees warning him to pull them up. In addition to his ball skills, Grealish is also known for his defensive work-rate and intelligent movement, as well as his ability to create chances for his teammates as a playmaker.

=== Reception ===
Grealish has frequently been compared to Paul Gascoigne and David Beckham for his talent, perceived hedonism, and popularity in England. Shaun Wright-Phillips has voiced his belief that Grealish is "of a similar mould" to Gascoigne, with Wayne Rooney, Bryan Robson, Troy Deeney and Tim Sherwood all expressing similar views. However, others argued that such comparisons should not be made, suggesting that they would prevent Grealish from developing into his own player. Grealish himself has stated that he would "love to be like Gazza [Paul Gascoigne]", adding that Gascoigne "played with such joy" – a trait that Grealish said in 2020 he would like to emulate.

In February 2021, in an interview with Talksport, former Aston Villa teammate Emiliano Martínez described Grealish as "the most talented player [he had] ever seen" and expressed surprise that he had not played more games for England. Martínez went on to say: "he never gives the ball away. When I see Grealish running, it's always a shot on target or a corner for us. He will drive past two or three players". Martínez also drew comparisons of Grealish to his Argentina teammate, Lionel Messi.

== Personal life ==
In March 2020, Grealish was found to have violated government guidance to stay at home in relation to COVID-19 regulations and was fined by Aston Villa. Grealish was banned from driving for nine months in the UK and fined £82,499 after pleading guilty to two counts of careless driving in March and October 2020, one in which he was filmed colliding with several parked cars during a turn in the road in his car.

Grealish has known his girlfriend, Sasha Rebecca Attwood, since meeting her at secondary school aged 16. His great-great-grandfather, Billy Garraty, was also a footballer, who earned one England cap and won the 1905 FA Cup final with Aston Villa. Grealish has a sister, Hollie, who has cerebral palsy. He describes her as his "best friend".

Grealish is known to have a close relationship with many of his Manchester City teammates, especially Norwegian Erling Haaland. On his relationship with Haaland, Grealish commented that he got on "really well with him," having "the same type of banter". Grealish has named Elvis Presley and Queen as two of his favourite musical artists.

In December 2023, thieves broke into his home in Cheshire, reportedly stealing jewellery and watches worth £1 million.

== Public image ==
Grealish is an amateur disc jockey. He once stated that if he had not become a footballer, he would have been a club promoter in Ibiza or Tenerife.

Often compared to the former England midfielder Paul Gascoigne, Grealish has been noted for his popularity among supporters in England and for a public image often described as relatable. and has been described as having a down-to-earth public persona, with teammate İlkay Gündoğan calling him "so humble and pure". Grealish has also been praised for how he interacts with and appreciates his fans.

== Career statistics ==
=== Club ===
As of match played 11 October 2026

Appearances and goals by club, season and competition
Club	Season	League			FA Cup		League Cup		Europe		Other		Total	
Club	Season	Division	Apps	Goals	Apps	Goals	Apps	Goals	Apps	Goals	Apps	Goals	Apps	Goals
Aston Villa	2013–14	Premier League	1	0	—		0	0	—		—		1	0
Aston Villa	2014–15	Premier League	17	0	6	0	1	0	—		—		24	0
Aston Villa	2015–16	Premier League	16	1	2	0	3	0	—		—		21	1
Aston Villa	2016–17	Championship	31	5	1	0	1	0	—		—		33	5
Aston Villa	2017–18	Championship	27	3	1	0	0	0	—		3 (Note: Appearances in Championship play-offs)	0	31	3
Aston Villa	2018–19	Championship	31	6	0	0	1	0	—		3	0	35	6
Aston Villa	2019–20	Premier League	36	8	0	0	5	2	—		—		41	10
Aston Villa	2020–21	Premier League	26	6	0	0	1	1	—		—		27	7
Aston Villa	Total		185	29	10	0	12	3	0	0	6	0	213	32
Notts County (loan)	2013–14	League One	37	5	1	0	—		—		1 (Note: Appearance in Football League Trophy)	0	39	5
Manchester City	2021–22	Premier League	26	3	4	2	1	0	7 (Note: Appearances in UEFA Champions League)	1	1 (Note: Appearance in FA Community Shield)	0	39	6
Manchester City	2022–23	Premier League	28	5	5	0	3	0	13	0	1	0	50	5
Manchester City	2023–24	Premier League	20	3	3	0	1	0	8	0	4 (Note: One appearance in FA Community Shield, one appearance in UEFA Super Cup, two appearances in FIFA Club World Cup)	0	36	3
Manchester City	2024–25	Premier League	20	1	5	1	1	0	6	1	0	0	32	3
Manchester City	2026–27	Premier League	1	0	—		—		—		1	0	2	0
Manchester City	Total		95	12	17	3	6	0	34	2	7	0	159	17
Everton (loan)	2025–26	Premier League	20	2	0	0	2	0	—		—		22	2
Everton (loan)	2026–27	Premier League	4	0	0	0	1	0	—		—		5	0
Everton (loan)	Total		24	2	0	0	3	0	—		—		27	2
Career total			341	48	28	3	21	3	34	2	14	0	437	56

=== International ===
Appearances and goals by national team and year
National team	Year	Apps	Goals
England	2020	5	0
England	2021	13	1
England	2022	11	1
England	2023	6	0
England	2024	4	2
Total		39	4

As of match played 13 October 2024
England score listed first, score column indicates score after each Grealish goal

List of international goals scored by Jack Grealish
No.	Date	Venue	Cap	Opponent	Score	Result	Competition	Ref.
1	9 October 2021	Estadi Nacional, Andorra la Vella, Andorra	16	Andorra	5–0	5–0	2022 FIFA World Cup qualification	
2	21 November 2022	Khalifa International Stadium, Doha, Qatar	25	Iran	6–1	6–2	2022 FIFA World Cup	
3	7 September 2024	Aviva Stadium, Dublin, Ireland	37	Republic of Ireland	2–0	2–0	2024–25 UEFA Nations League B	
4	13 October 2024	Helsinki Olympic Stadium, Helsinki, Finland	39	Finland	1–0	3–1	2024–25 UEFA Nations League B	

== Honours ==
Aston Villa

- EFL Championship play-offs: 2019
- FA Cup runner-up: 2014–15
- EFL Cup runner-up: 2019–20

Manchester City

- Premier League: 2021–22, 2022–23, 2023–24
- FA Cup: 2022–23; runner-up: 2023–24, 2024–25
- UEFA Champions League: 2022–23
- UEFA Super Cup: 2023
- FIFA Club World Cup: 2023

England U21

- Toulon Tournament: 2016

England

- UEFA European Championship runner-up: 2020

Individual

- Premier League Player of the Month: August 2025
- FAI Under-17 Irish International Player of the Year: 2012
- FAI Under-21 Irish International Player of the Year: 2015
- Aston Villa Young Player of the Season: 2014–15
- PFA Team of the Year: 2018–19 Championship
- Aston Villa Player of the Season: 2019–20
