= Ruminal tympany =

Disease of ruminant animals

Ruminal tympany, also known as ruminal bloat, is a disease of ruminant animals, characterized by an excessive volume of gas in the rumen. Ruminal tympany may be primary, known as frothy bloat, or secondary, known as free-gas bloat.

In the rumen, food eaten by the ruminant is fermented by microbes. This fermentation process continually produces gas, the majority of which is expelled from the rumen by eructation (burping). Ruminal tympany occurs when this gas becomes trapped in the rumen.

In frothy bloat (primary ruminal tympany), the gas produced by fermentation is trapped within the fermenting material in the rumen, causing a build up of foam which cannot be released by burping. In cattle, the disease may be triggered after an animal eats a large amount of easily fermenting plants, such as legumes, alfalfa, red clover, or white clover. Some legumes, such as sainfoin, birdsfoot trefoil and cicer milkvetch are not associated with causing bloat in cattle. In feedlot cattle, a diet containing a high proportion of cereal grain can lead to primary ruminal tympany. The main signs of bloat in cattle are distension of the left side of the abdomen, dyspnea (difficulty breathing) and severe distress. If gas continues to accumulate, the right side of the abdomen may also become distended, with death occurring in cattle within 3–4 hours after symptoms begin.

In free-gas bloat (secondary ruminal tympany), gas builds up in the rumen and cannot escape, due to blockage of the esophagus.

== Treatment ==
1. Removal of gases through trocar or cannula (tubes crossing the skin, abdominal cavity, into the rumen).
2. Use stomach tube and remove the ruminal digesta. A rumen fistula also helps with esophageal obstruction.
3. Medi oral (antifoaming agent) 10ml+250ml warm water and drench to the animal. If antifoaming agent not available, vegetable oil can be used, 400–500ml per large animal
4. Sodium bicarbonate
5. Nux vomica
6. Antihistamine is used to avoid lameness. One particular sign in acidosis is lameness. Because lactic acid accumulates in the coronary band, it causes irritation; histamine is released which causes lameness, so antihistamine is used to avoid it.

== Cultural depictions ==
- Thomas Hardy's novel Far from the Madding Crowd depicts a flock of sheep suffering from bloat, which are saved by shepherd Gabriel Oak using a trocar to release the gas.
- In the second chapter of James Herriot's book All Creatures Great and Small, an anxious James waits to meet his new boss while haunted by a college tale of a newly-qualified veterinarian who ruined his career when he blew up a farmer's shed by applying his cigarette lighter to gas being released from a bloated cow. This same accident was portrayed in the TV series of the same name, but with Farmer Skerry striking a match to light his cigarette as James' colleague Tristan releases the gas. Here, the scene was played for humor instead of as a disaster.
- In the neo-Western television drama Yellowstone, a herd of cattle are killed after ingesting bales of alfalfa in the episode 'Only Devils Left'.
