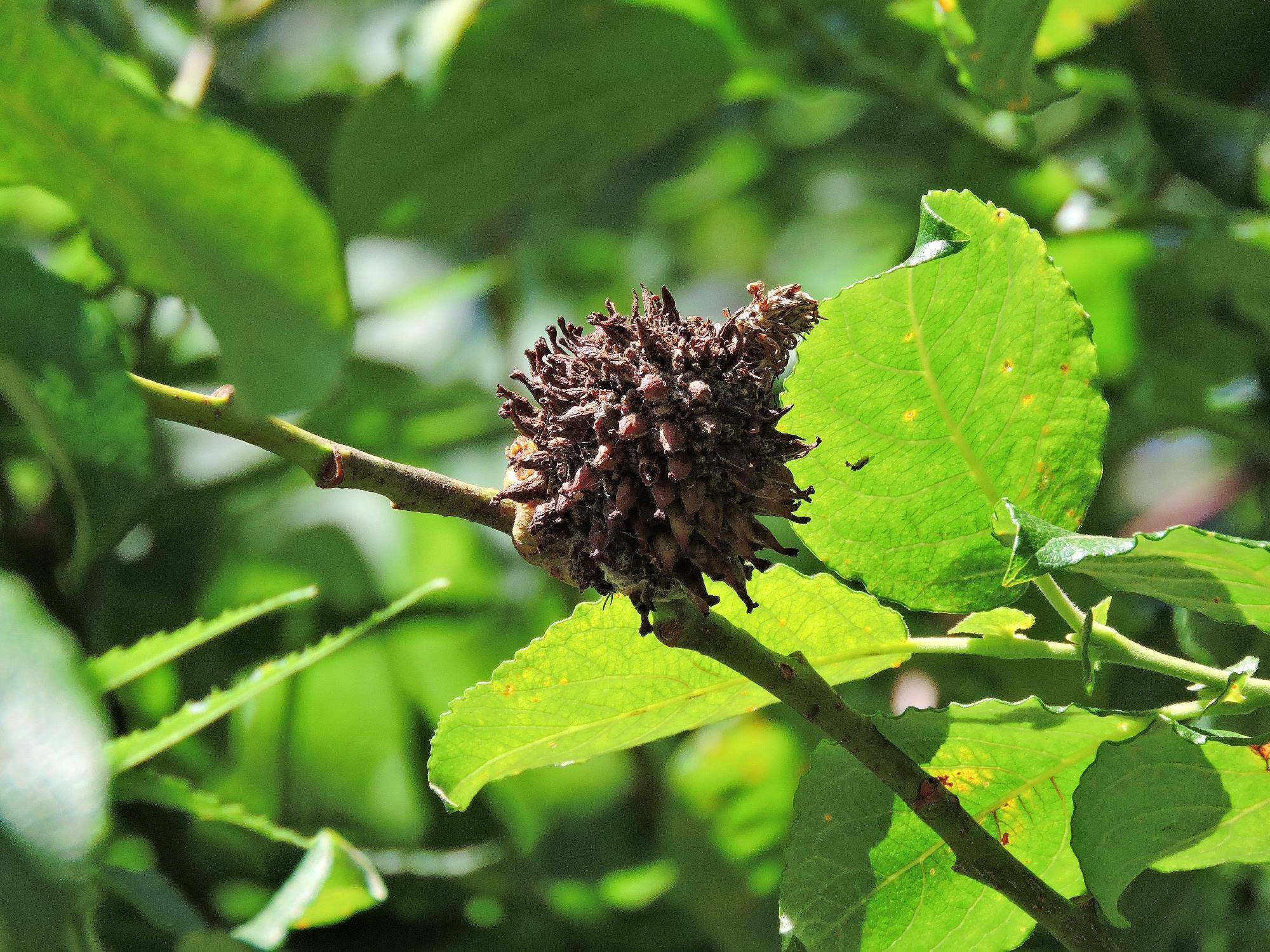
- Rabdophaga strobilina on Grew Willow in Merseyside, England

Scientific classification
- Kingdom: Animalia
- Phylum: Arthropoda
- Class: Insecta
- Order: Diptera
- Family: Cecidomyiidae
- Genus: Rabdophaga
- Species: R. strobilina

Binomial name
- Rabdophaga strobilina (Bremi, 1847)

Synonyms
- Dasineura strobilina

= Rabdophaga strobilina =

Species of fly

Rabdophaga strobilina is a gall midge and inquiline of Rabdophaga rosaria and Rabdophaga terminalis; also gall midges. It was first described by Johann Jacob Bremi-Wolf in 1847.

== Description ==
Rabdophaga rosaria forms Camellia galls (also known as a terminal rosette gall) on willow (Salix) species. R. strobilina is a close relative of R. rosaria and the larva of strobilina live under the modified leaves of the galls made by rosaria larva. If there are many larva of strobilina, the gall can enlarge and change shape from a rosette, into a 30–40 mm long cone-shaped artichoke. R. strobilina is also an inquiline of Rabdophaga terminalis.

== Distribution ==
The insect or gall has been found in Belgium, Denmark, Turkey and the United Kingdom.
