= Tympany =

Medical condition

- Other names: meteorism, tympanites, tympanism, tympania
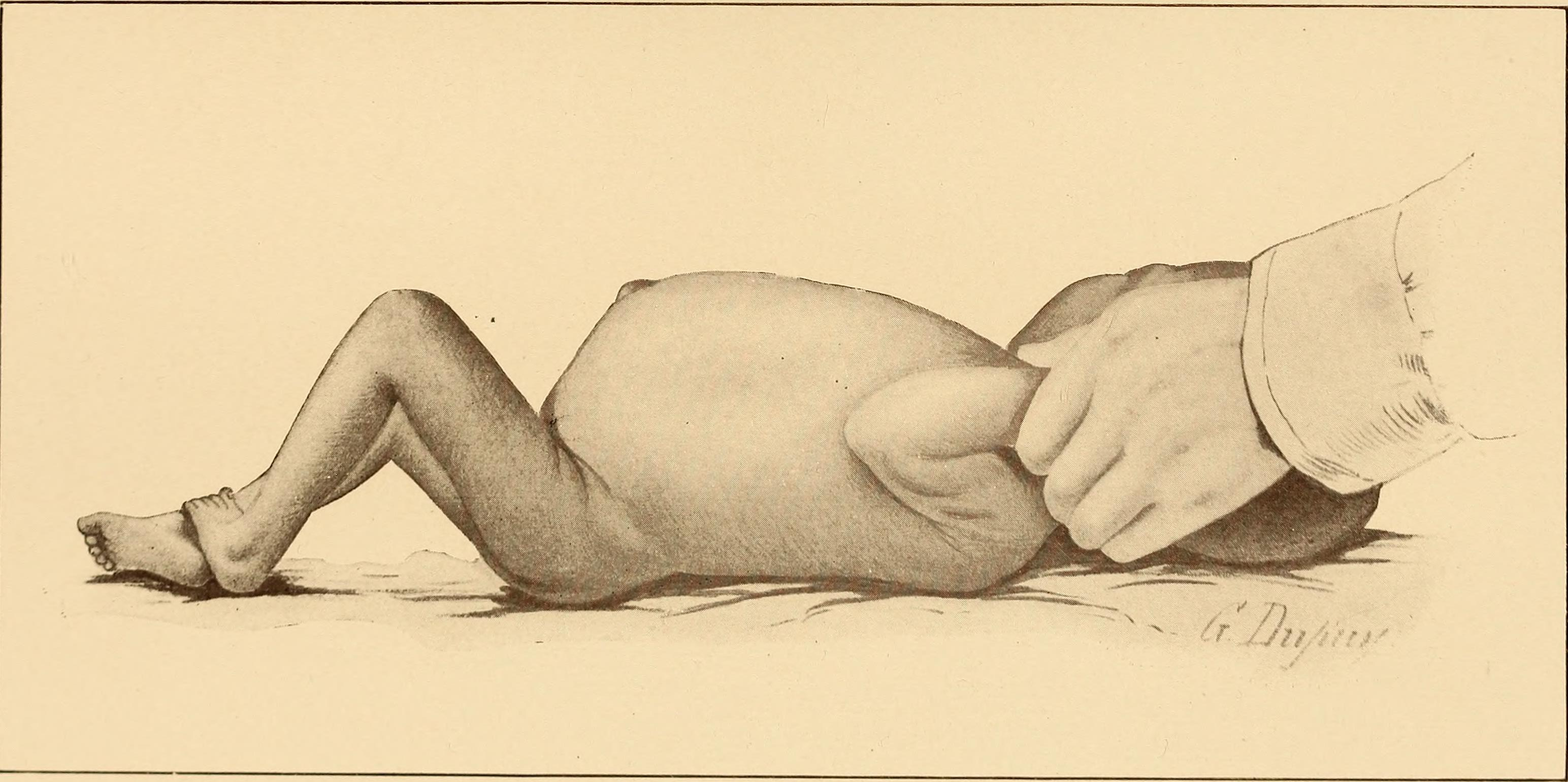
- Specialty: Gastroenterology

Tympany or tympanites (sometimes tympanism or tympania), also known as meteorism (especially in humans), is a medical condition in which excess gas accumulates in the gastrointestinal tract and causes abdominal distension. The term is from the Greek τύμπανο (meaning "drum").

== Possible causes ==
- Bowel obstruction
- Renal stones
- Functional disorder
- Overeating
- Bacterial overgrowth
- Inflammation of the bowel
- Blunt kidney trauma
- Peritonitis
- Menstruation

== See also ==
- Ruminal tympany
- Bloating
- Kwashiorkor
