= Johann Jacob Bremi-Wolf =

Swiss entomologist (1791–1857)

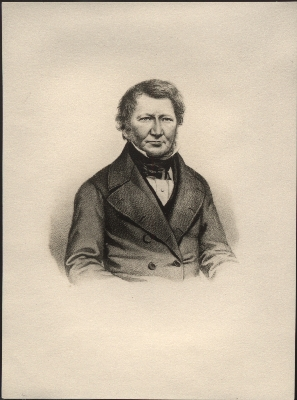
Johann Jacob Bremi-Wolf

Johann Jacob Bremi-Wolf (25 May 1791, Dübendorf – 27 February 1857, Zürich) was a Swiss entomologist and Kunsthandwerker (artist wood turner) in Zürich.

Bremi was born in Dübendorf, Switzerland to a pastor Johann Heinrich Bremi. He became deaf due to typhus fever at the age of 11 which made him shift from a clergy career to a trade in wood work with lathes. He however took an interest in insects and began to collect them and read about science. He married Magdalena Barbara Wolf in 1818 and they had two children. He corresponded with J.J. Siegfried of Zurich, Oswald Heer, Johannes Jacob Hegetschweiler and Friedrich Schulthess. He noted in poems that his deafness allowed him to focus on work but at some times he expressed a wish for being able to hear. His entomological herbarium is held by the Museum Wiesbaden. Other parts of his insect collection, especially Diptera are held by the Naturforschende Gesellschaft in Zürich.

Several organisms have been named after him, including the moth species Lithocolletis bremiella by Zeller, the fly genus Bremiola by Rübsaamen, and the oomycete genus Bremia.

== Works ==
- Bremi-Wolf, J.J. (1856) Catalog der schweizerischen Coleopteren, als Vorläufer der Beiträge für schweizerische Entomologie. Friedrich Schulthess, Zürich. vi + 78 pp. (8vo)
- Bremi-Wolf, J.J. (1847) Beiträge zu einer Monographie der Gallmücken, Cecidomyia Meigen.Neue Denkschriften der Allg. Schweizerischen Gesellschaft für die Gesammten Naturwissenschaften, 9.3: 71 S.; Neuenburg (Selbstverlag).
