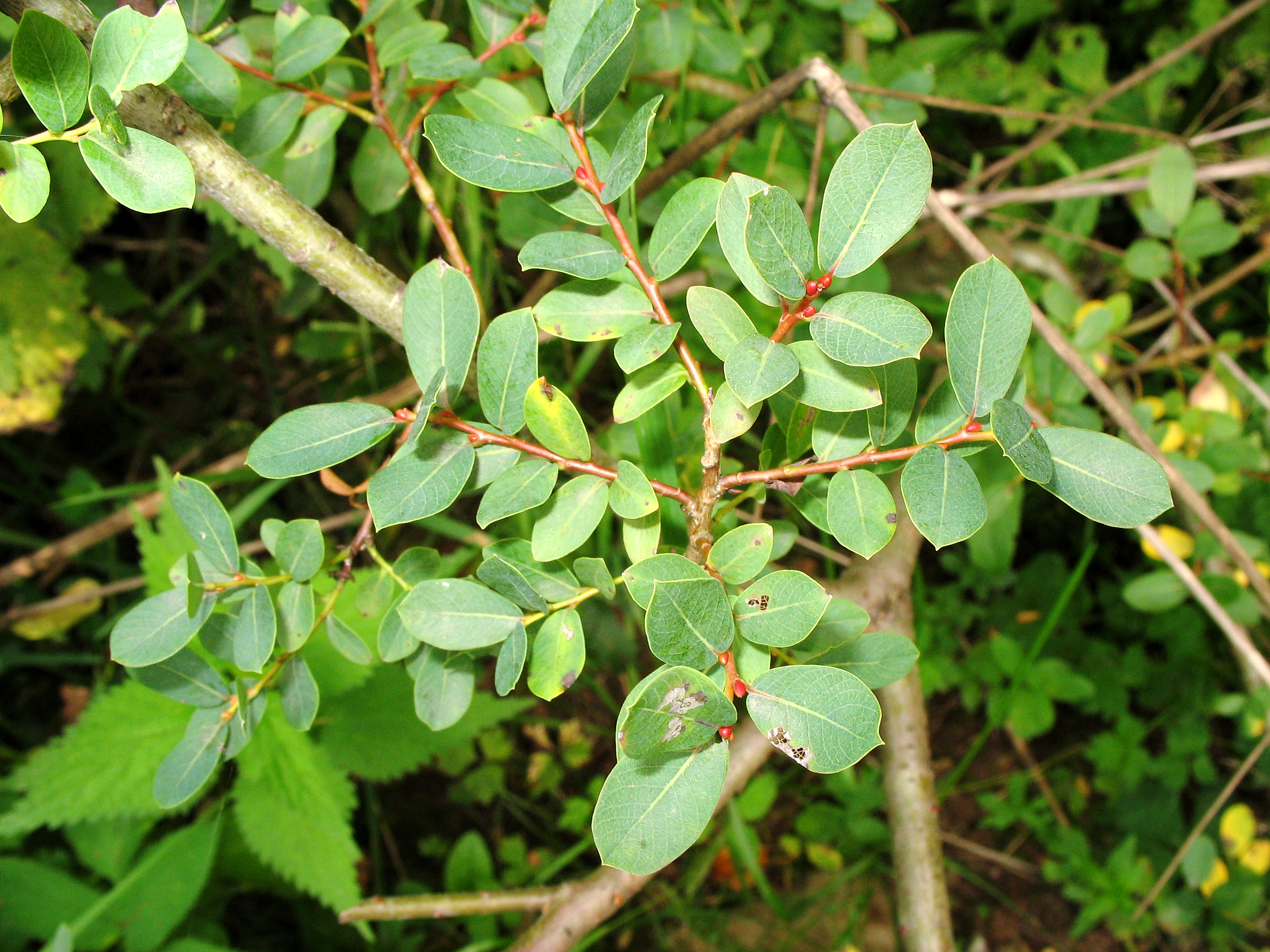

Scientific classification
- Kingdom: Plantae
- Clade: Tracheophytes
- Clade: Angiosperms
- Clade: Eudicots
- Clade: Rosids
- Order: Malpighiales
- Family: Salicaceae
- Genus: Salix
- Species: S. caesia

Binomial name
- Salix caesia Vill.

= Salix caesia =

Species of shrub

Salix caesia is a small shrub in the genus Salix, the willows. It is widespread, mainly in Asia.

== Taxonomy ==
The name Salix caesia was first published in 1789 by Dominique Villars. Synonyms for Salix caesia are: Salix minutiflora Turczaninow ex ELWolf, Salix divergens Andersson, and Salix myricaefolia Andersson.

== Description ==
Salix caesia is a densely branched dwarf shrub that reaches heights of up to 70 cm (28 in). The bark of young twigs is reddish-brown or reddish-black and sometimes silky hairy; later the bark of the branches is bare, brown and shiny.

The leaves are simple, alternate, and glabrous, with a petiole 1 to 3 mm (0.039 to 0.12 in) long. The blade is 0.5 to 3 cm (0.20 to 1.18 in) long and 0.3 to 1 cm (0.12 to 0.39 in) wide, elliptical to obovate, with a pointed (rarely blunt) tip and a wedge-shaped base. They are dark green on the upper surfaces and blueish green on the undersides. The leaf margin is nearly smooth. The stipules are usually small.

The flowering period begins in May. The catkins are elongated with a length of 1 to 2 cm (0.39 to 0.79 in). The bracts are light brown, weak, and hairy. The male flowers contain two stamens, partially fused, and the anthers are dark blue-violet. In female flowers, the ovary is almost sessile, hairy, the style relatively short and thick, the stigmas red and not divided, and they have a nectar gland.

The yellowish to brown, hairy, two-lobed capsule fruits are 4 to 5 mm (0.16 to 0.20 in) long. The seeds are surrounded by fine hairs.

The number of chromosomes is 2n=76.

== Distribution and habitat ==
The main distribution areas of Salix caesia are the Chinese autonomous regions of Xinjiang and Tibet; Central Asia: Afghanistan, Kyrgyzstan, Tajikistan, Mongolia; West and East Siberia, Pakistan and Kashmir. It is very rare in Europe, where it has been found in Italy, France, Switzerland, and Austria.

It grows in subalpine meadows and thickets. It is a characteristic species of German "Salicetum Caesio-foetidae" from the association "Salicion waldsteinianae".
