= Dieter Rübsaamen =

German painter

Dieter Rübsaamen ( 24 August 1937 in Wiesbaden) is a German painter.

== Biography ==
Born in Wiesbaden in 1937, raised in Maxsain (Westerwald); law studies; has worked as an artist since 1957, autodidact. About 100 exhibitions in Germany and abroad since 1962. Art scholarship of the City of Bonn in 1990. August Macke Laureate of the City of Bonn in 2008. Works in numerous collections. Lives in Bonn.
