= Blunt kidney trauma =

Kidney injury without skin penetration

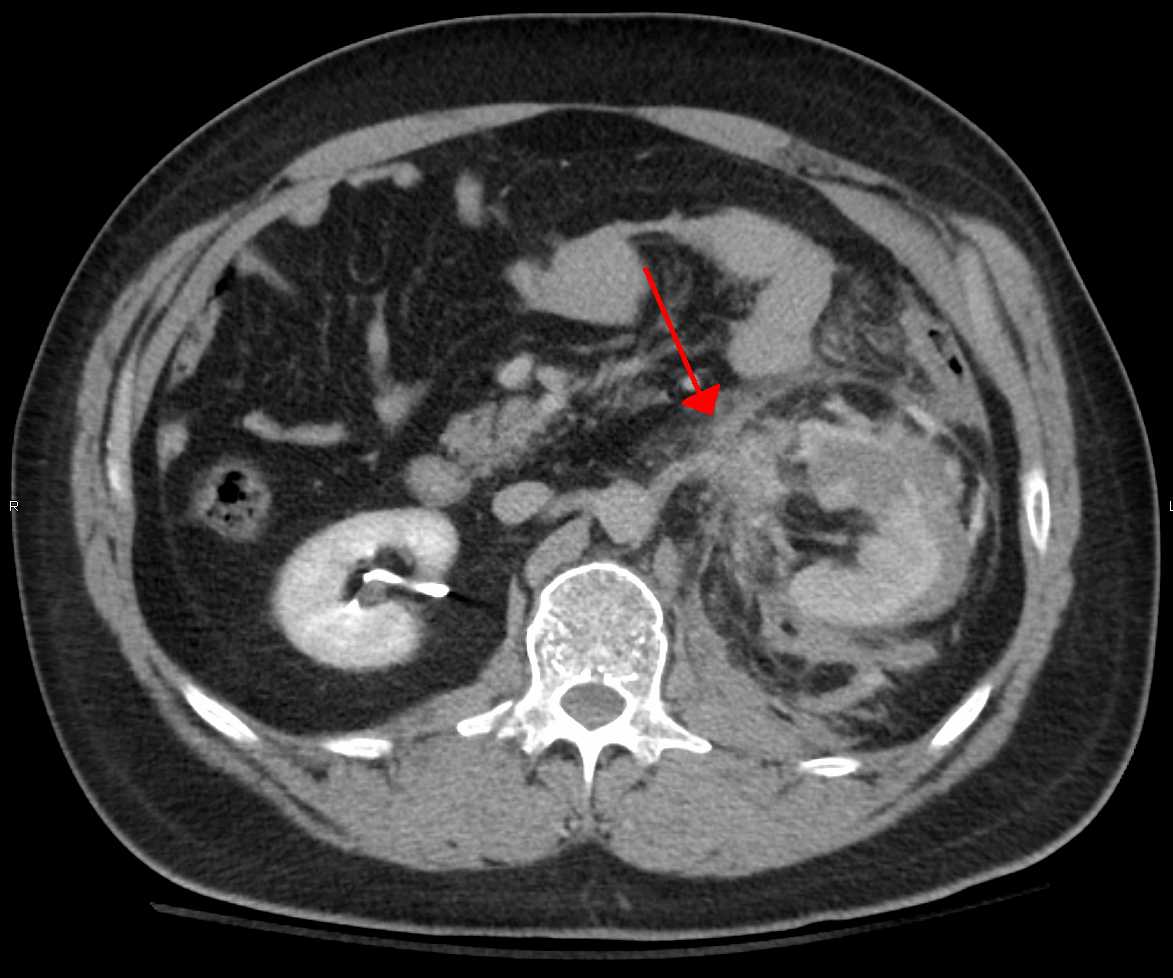
Abdominal CT showing left renal artery injury

The kidney is injured in approximately 10 percent of all significant blunt abdominal trauma. Of those, 13 percent are sports-related when the kidney, followed by testicle, is most frequently involved. However, the most frequent cause by far is traffic collisions, followed by falls. The consequences are usually less severe than injuries involving other internal organs.

== Sports related injury ==
Blunt injuries to the kidney from helmets, shoulder pads, and knees are described in football, and in soccer, martial arts, and all-terrain vehicle crashes. A literature review of peer-reviewed articles in May 2009 demonstrated that urogenital injuries are uncommon in team and individual sports, and that most of them are low-grade injuries, cycling being the most commonly associated, followed by winter sports, horse riding and contact/collision sports. A special situation has existed in the athletic participant with a single kidney.

Formerly, the American Academy of Pediatrics Committee on Sports Medicine and Fitness advised against such children and adolescents from participating in contact sports. Children's kidney's are prone to injury from blunt force trauma due to their size and location in a child's body. However, a study of 45,000 children with kidney injuries demonstrated no kidney loss in any contact sport. Sledding, skiing and rollerblading did, however, result in such loss. Further, data from the National Athletic Trainers' Association High School Injury Surveillance Study, an observational cohort study during the 1995–1997 academic years, have been used to compare incidence rates for sport-specific injuries to specific organs. There were over 4.4 million athlete-exposures, defined as 1 athlete participating in 1 game or practice. Student athletes incurred kidney injuries most often playing football (12 injuries) or girls' soccer (2 injuries).

The American Academy of Pediatrics currently recommends a "qualified yes" for participation by athletes with single kidneys in contact/collision sports although some physicians remain reluctant to acquiesce.

== Diagnosis ==
In blunt injury, imaging is indicated if there is gross hematuria, or if the patient exhibits shock together with either gross or microscopic hematuria.

=== Investigation ===
The imaging modality of choice is contrast-enhanced, computed tomography (CT) which is readily available in most emergency departments of moderate or above size. Scan times have become shorter with each generation of scanners and current scans are quick and accurately demonstrate renal injuries together with associated injuries to other abdominal or retroperitoneal organs.

Online calculators have been developed that facilitate grading of renal traumatic injuries based on imaging findings according to AAST (American Association for the Surgery of Trauma) guidelines.

== Treatment ==
Unlike ultrasound examination (FAST), CT provides anatomic and functional information that allows for accurate grading of the injury which is partly responsible for a growing trend toward conservative management (intravenous fluids, close monitoring, watchful waiting) of renal trauma. Conservative management does not apply in situations where extensive urinary extravasation or devitalized areas of renal parenchyma are found and especially if associated with injuries to other abdominal organs; these cases are complication-prone and much more likely to require surgery. That being said, a retrospective study suggests that primary conservative treatment of blunt kidney rupture seems to lead to less surgery, especially less open surgery, and less blood and renal parenchyma loss, compared to a strategy of initial surgery.

== See also ==
- Abdominal trauma
