= Gastropexy =

Surgical operation

- ICD-9-CM: 44.64

Gastropexy is a surgical operation in which the stomach is sutured to the abdominal wall or the diaphragm. Gastropexies in which the stomach is sutured to the diaphragm are sometimes performed as a treatment of GERD to prevent the stomach from moving up into the chest.

== See also ==
- Laparoscopic surgery
