= Ewald Heinrich Rübsaamen =

German zoologist (1857–1919)

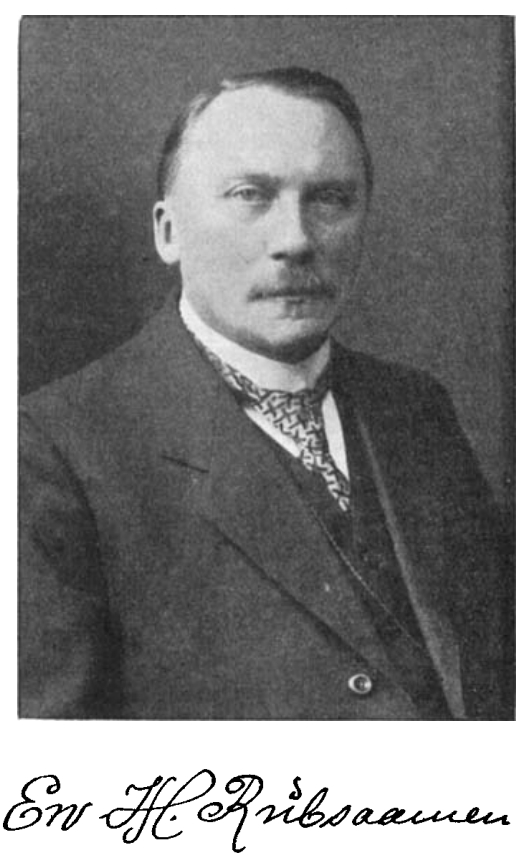

Ewald Richard Heinrich Rübsaamen (20 May 1857, Haardt – 17 March 1919, Metternich) was a German teacher, artist, and amateur entomologist who studied gall forming insects, especially the gall midges (Cecidomyiidae), and worked on pest control in grapes, most importantly on Phylloxera.

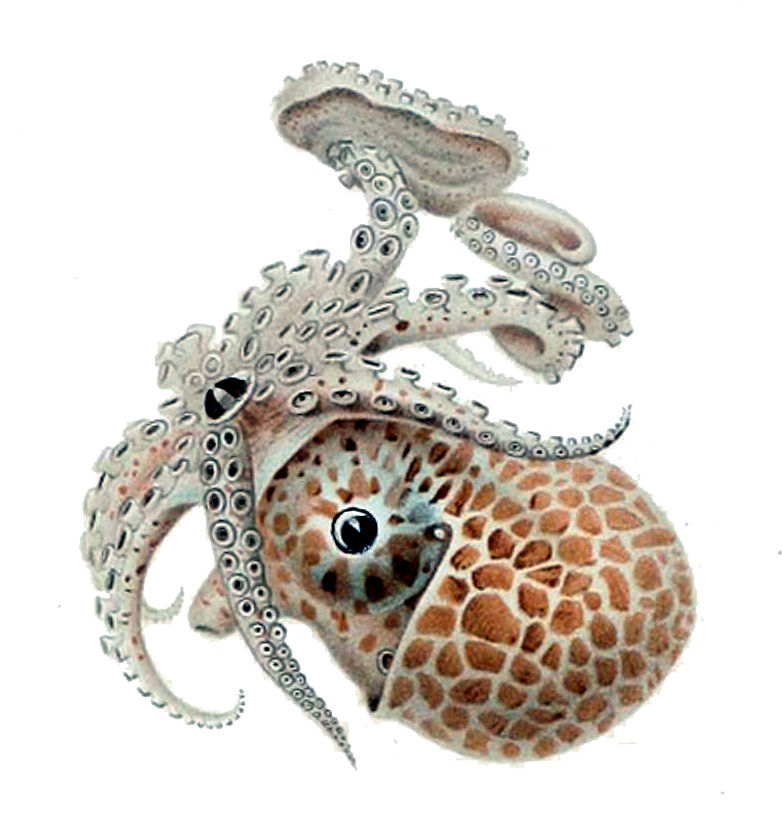
Argonauta sp. illustration by Rübsaamen

Rübsaamen was the second son of Johann Franz and Emilie Mathilde Johanne. His father manufactured precision mechanical instruments for mines. After school at Weidenau, Ewald entered the gymnasium in Siegen and in 1875 went to study mathematics at the Technical College in Karlsruhe. He however gave up studies after four semesters and began to train in art and returned to work as an arts teacher in Hilchenbach. He worked in a primary school in Steinhauserberg from 1878 and then moved to Siegen to head a private school. He also began to study botany and zoology. He took a special interest in gall insects including midges and related nematoceran flies. He described numerous species from collections. In 1891, following the death of his father, the family moved to Berlin and he worked at the Plant Physiology Institute while also attending the Royal Art School. He worked for Karl August Möbius at the Museum für Naturkunde. In 1909 he headed the state phylloxera control unit in Rhineland and was titled a professor in 1912 by the Ministry of Agriculture. His sister Rosa Wilhelmine Henriette (1852-1922) returned to Siegen and became a poet of repute. Rübsaamen clashed with the entomologist Jean-Jacques Kieffer on various matters. His archives are in the Humboldt University Berlin and his specimens are in the Stuttgart Museum of Natural History.

Rübsaamen was a member of the Academy of Sciences Leopoldina in Halle from 1917. He began to suffer from various illnesses of the heart and lung and died at the age of 61.

Drawings by Rübsaamen

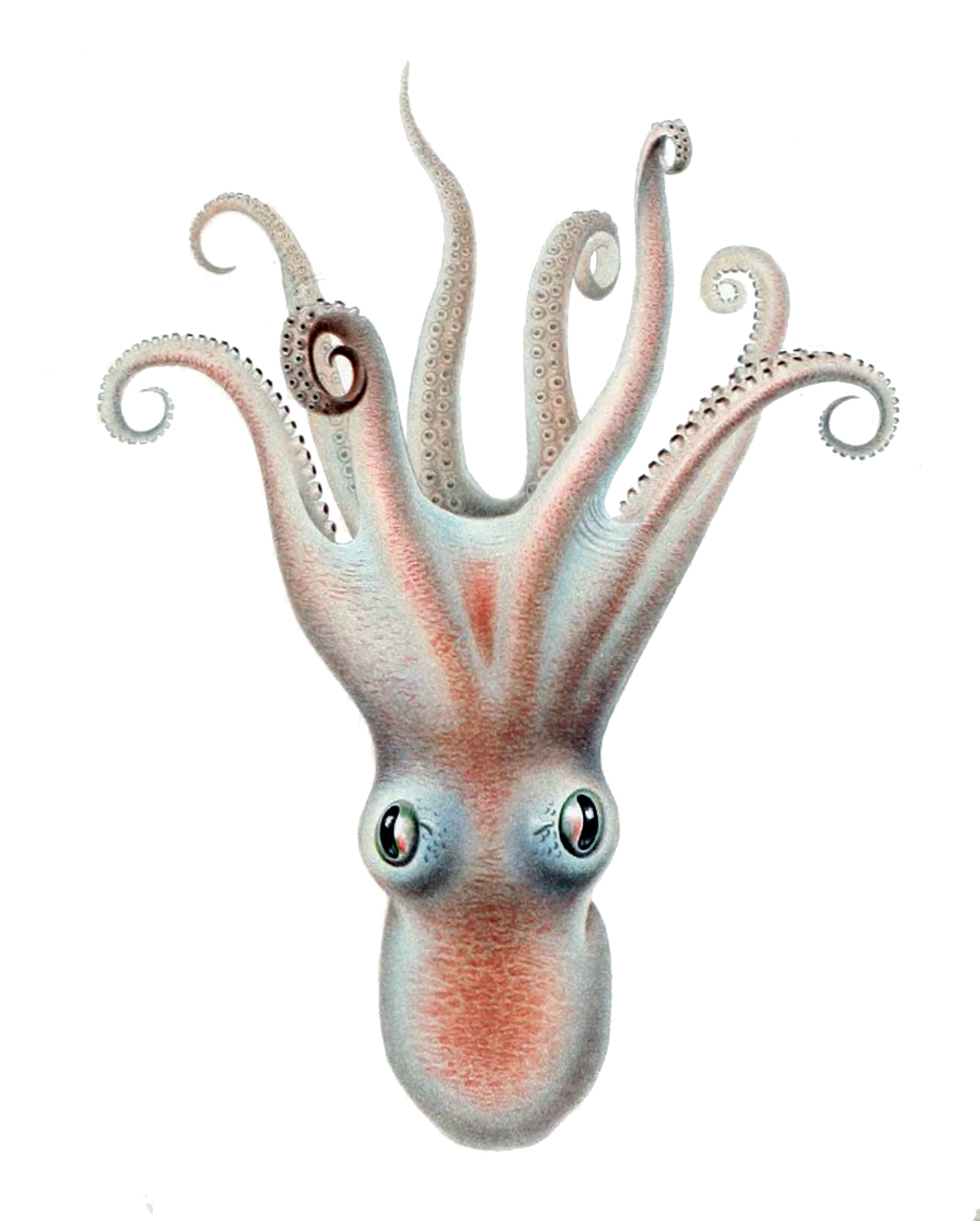
Bathypolypus valdiviae

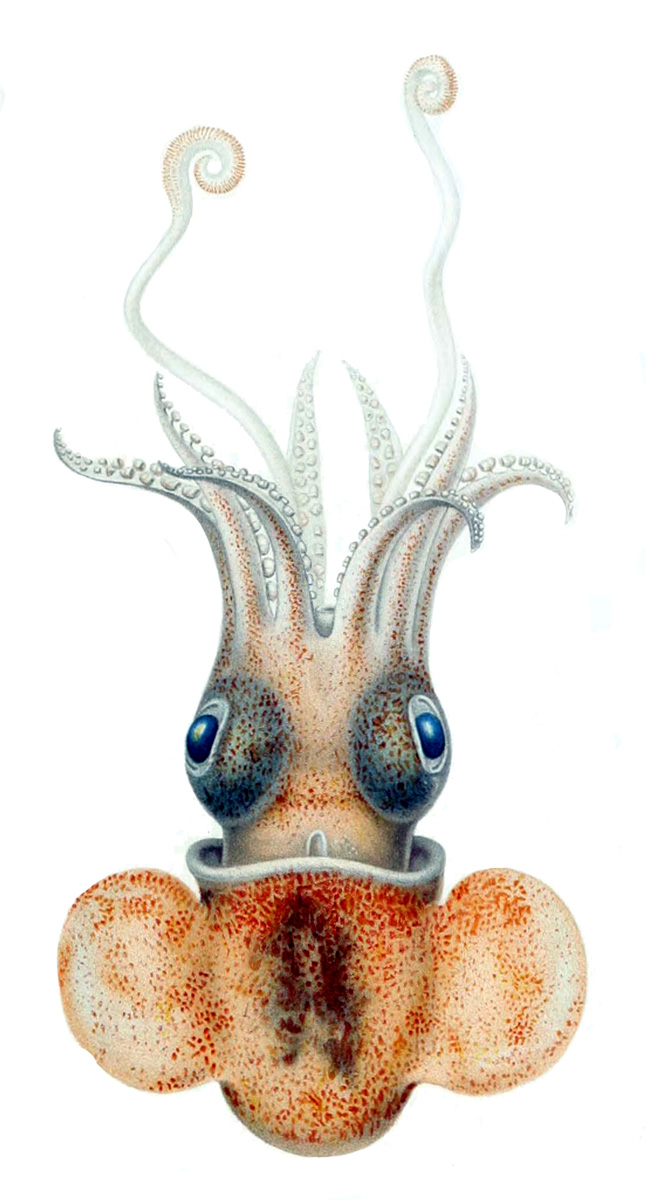
Austrorossia mastigophora

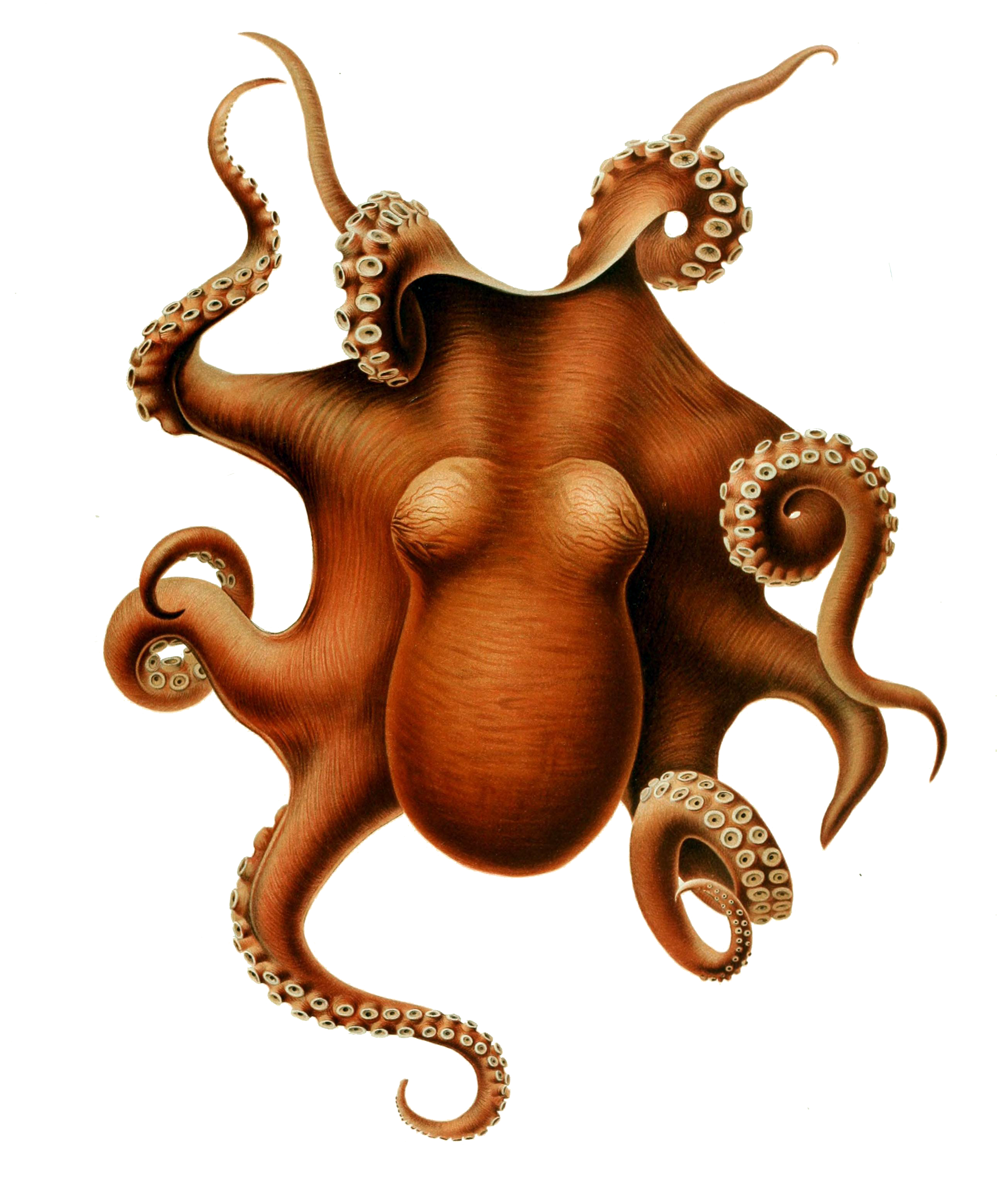
Benthoctopus levis

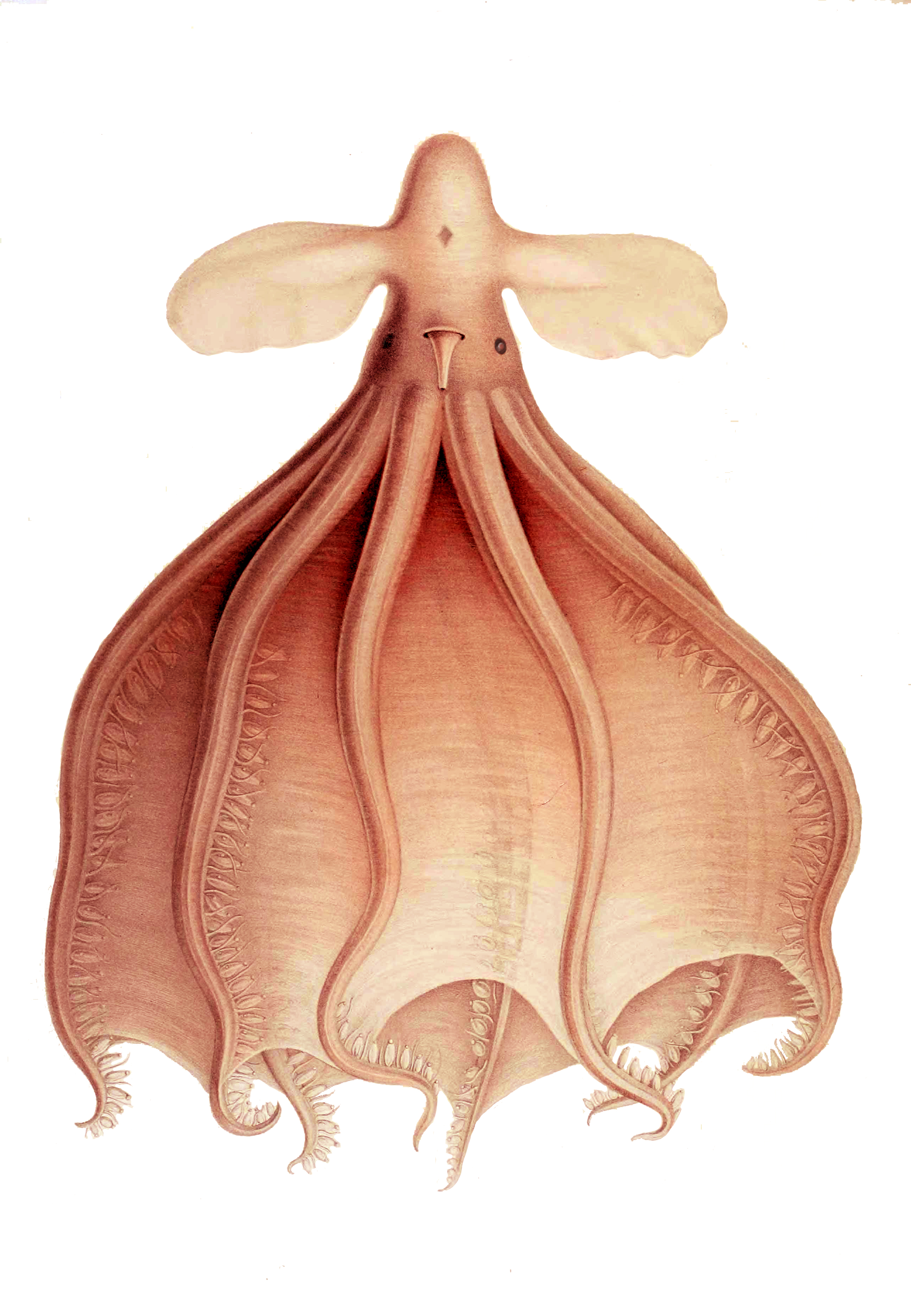
Cirrothauma murrayi

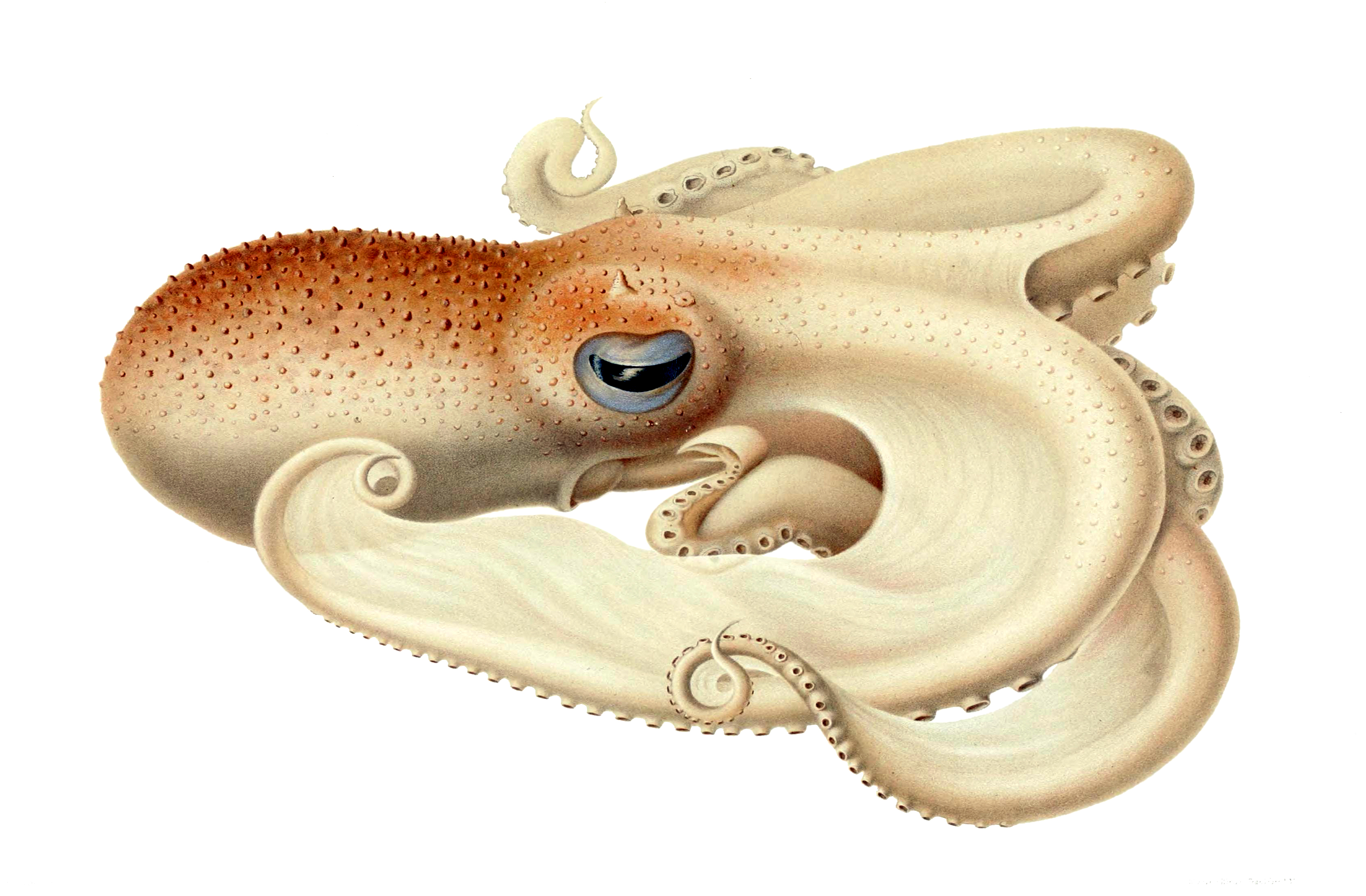
Velodona togata
