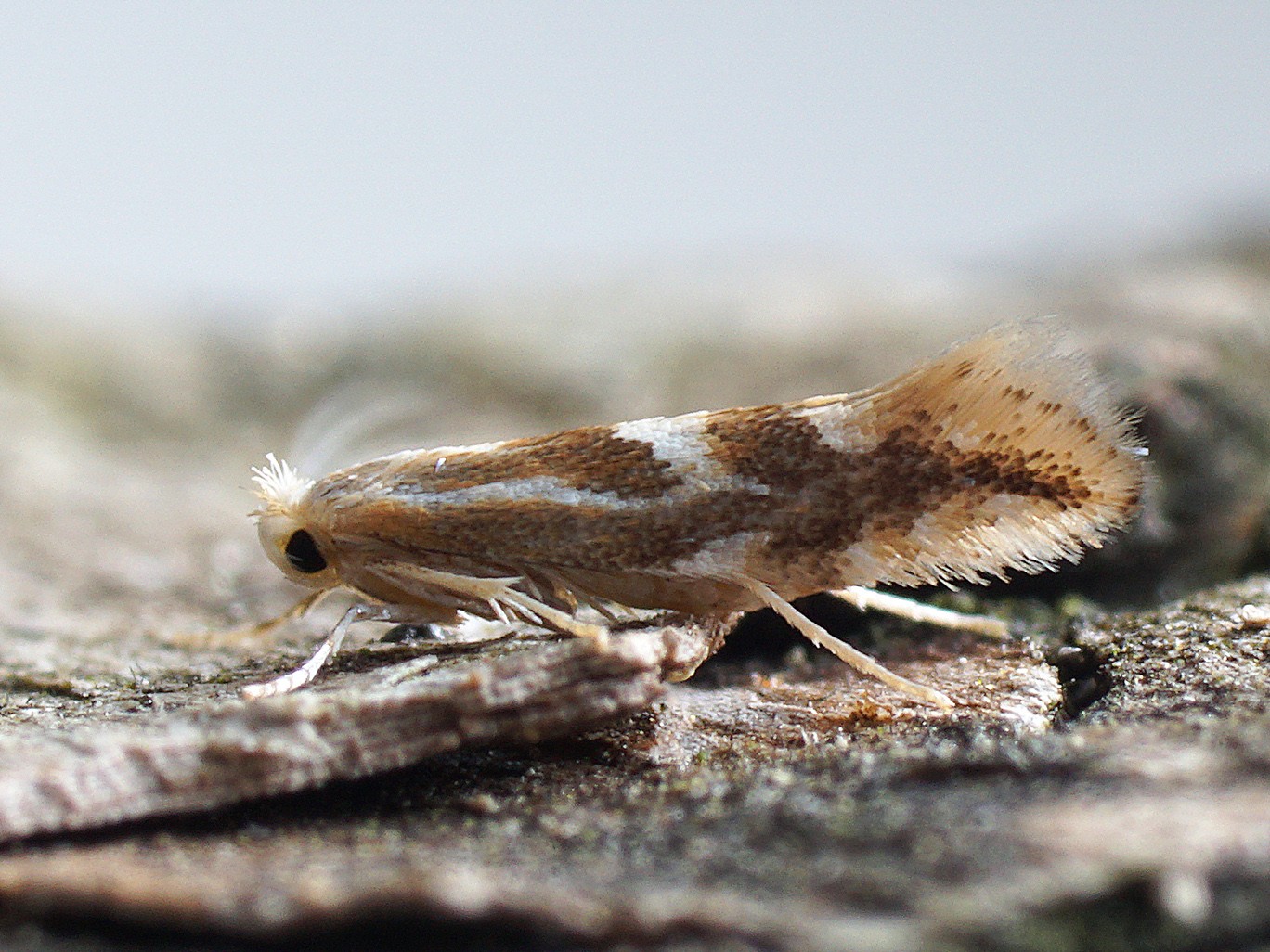
- Phyllonorycter salictella Moscow Oblast
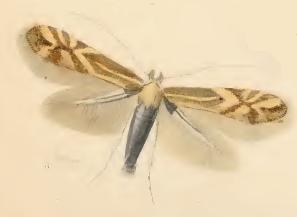

Scientific classification
- Kingdom: Animalia
- Phylum: Arthropoda
- Clade: Pancrustacea
- Class: Insecta
- Order: Lepidoptera
- Family: Gracillariidae
- Genus: Phyllonorycter
- Species: P. salictella

Binomial name
- Phyllonorycter salictella (Zeller, 1846)

Synonyms
- Argyromiges viminiella Sircom, 1848; Lithocolletis salictella Zeller, 1846

= Phyllonorycter salictella =

Species of moth

Phyllonorycter salictella is a moth of the family Gracillariidae. It is known from all of Europe (except the Balkan Peninsula and the Mediterranean islands), east to Russia and Japan.

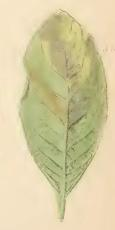
Mined leaf of Salix caprea

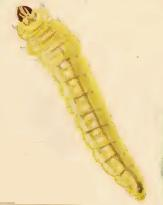
Larva

The wingspan is 7–9 mm. The forewings are shining ochreous, sometimes fuscous-tinged; a median streak from base to near middle, four costal and three dorsal wedge-shaped spots obscure whitish-ochreous, ill-defined and sometimes very indistinct, first dorsal long; a blackish apical strigula. Hindwings are grey. The larva is pale yellowish; dorsal line dark grey; head pale brown.

There are two generations per year with adults on wing in May and June and again in August.

The larvae feed on Salix alba, Salix babylonica, Salix daphnoides, Salix × fragilis, Salix elaeagnos (syn. S. incana [Schrank]), Salix purpurea, Salix triandra and Salix viminalis. They mine the leaves of their host plant.
