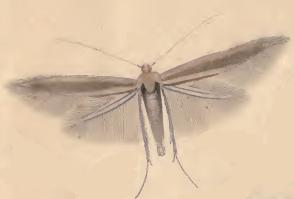

Scientific classification
- Kingdom: Animalia
- Phylum: Arthropoda
- Class: Insecta
- Order: Lepidoptera
- Family: Coleophoridae
- Genus: Coleophora
- Species: C. lusciniaepennella

Binomial name
- Coleophora lusciniaepennella (Treitschke, 1833)

Synonyms
- Ornix lusciniaepennella Treitschke, 1833; Coleophora viminetella Zeller, 1849; Coleophora orbitella Herrich-Schäffer, 1853 nec Zeller, 1849 (misid.); Coleophora draghiaella Capuse, 1971

= Coleophora lusciniaepennella =

Species of moth

Coleophora lusciniaepennella is a moth of the family Coleophoridae. It is found in most of Europe, except the Iberian Peninsula, the Mediterranean islands and most of the Balkan Peninsula and Russia. It occurs in forest-steppe biotopes.

The wingspan is 10–13.5 mm (0.39–0.53 in).The head is greyish-ochreous. Antennae white, indistinctly ringed with fuscous, basal joint greyish-ochreous, long. Forewings shining greyish-ochreous. Hindwings dark grey.The larva is ochreous-brownish; head, plate of 2, and two spots on 3 black: in a bicolorous case of leaf-fragments, anteriorly pale, posteriorly dark, on Salix and Myrica.

The moth flies from June to July depending on the location.

The larvae feed on Myrica gale, Populus tremula, Salix alba, Salix aurita, Salix babylonica, Salix caprea, Salix cinerea, Salix dasyclados, Salix fragilis, Salix glabra, Salix pentandra, Salix repens, Salix triandra and Salix viminalis. Full-grown larvae can be found at the end of May.

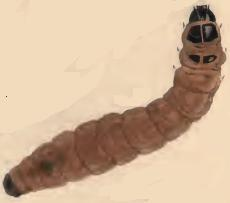
Larva
