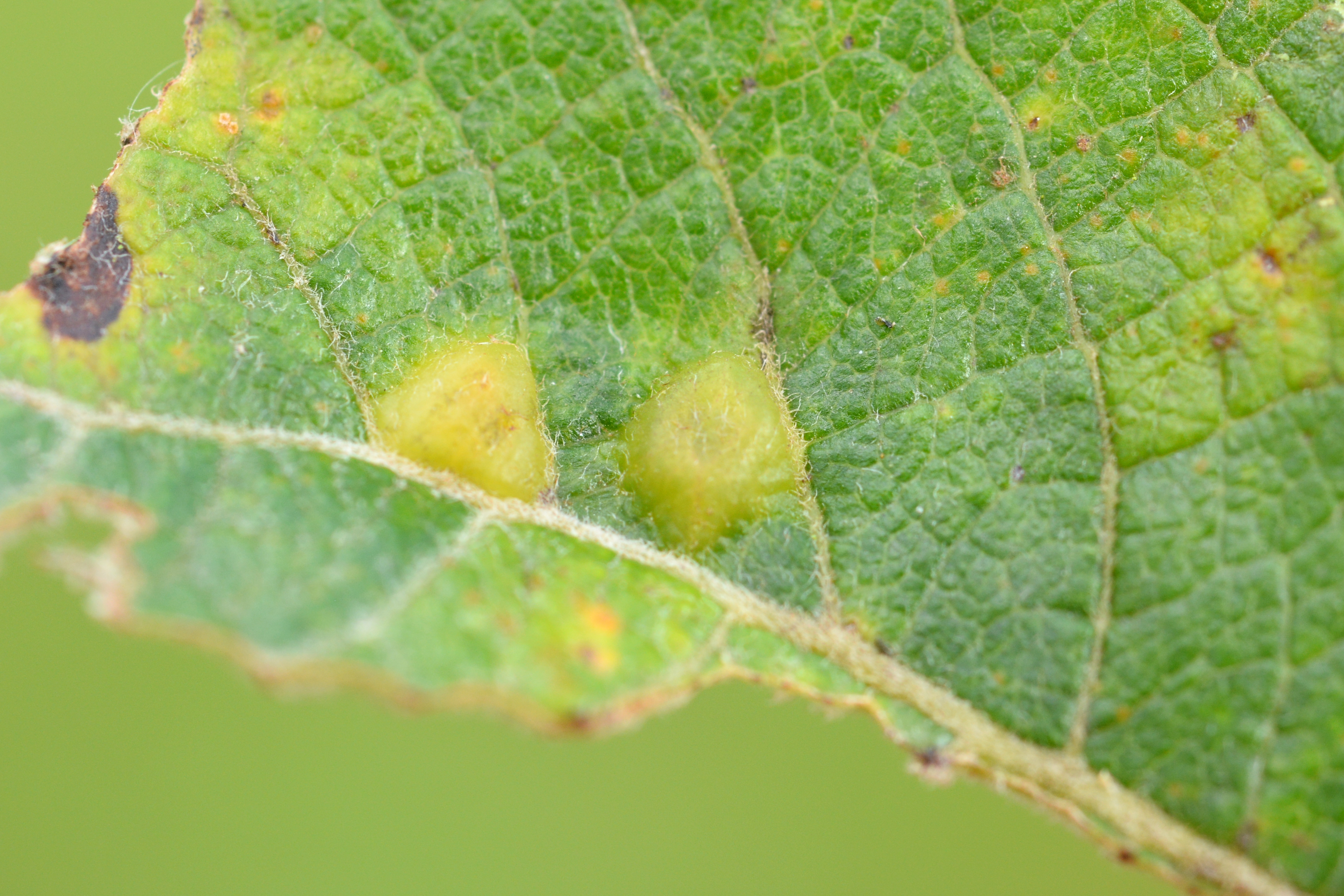

Scientific classification
- Kingdom: Animalia
- Phylum: Arthropoda
- Class: Insecta
- Order: Diptera
- Family: Cecidomyiidae
- Genus: Iteomyia
- Species: I. capreae

Binomial name
- Iteomyia capreae (Winnertz, 1853)

Synonyms
- Cecidomyia salicisfolii Hardy, 1854; Iteomyia salicisfolii (Hardy, 1854); Cecidomyia capreae Winnertz, 1853

= Iteomyia capreae =

Species of fly

Iteomyia capreae is a gall midge which forms galls on willows (Salix species). It was first described by Johannes Winnertz in 1853.

== Description of the gall ==
The midge forms two different galls which can be found, either on the leaf bade or on a side-vein of a leaf.

- in the leaf blade the gall is a hard, domed pouch above, and below it is conical, with a red-rimmed opening. The opening is hairless and initially greenish, later becoming yellow, brown, purple or red. It contains a single larva which is white at first and later orange or red.
- the side-vein is a 2–3 mm long, hard swelling, containing the larva.

When mature the larvae drop from the gall, overwintering in the soil and pupating in the spring.

The galls are found on sallows or their hybrids and include, almond willow (S. triandra), common osier (S. viminalis), crack willow (S. fragilis), dark-leaved willow (S. myrsinifolia), eared willow (S. aurita), European violet willow (S. daphnoides), goat willow (S. caprea), grey willow (S. cinerea) and S. appendiculata.

== Distribution ==
The insect has been recorded in Asia, and Europe, from Ireland and Portugal in the west, through to Siberia, China and Japan in the east.
