= Pavenham Osier Beds =

Nature reserve in Bedfordshire, England

Coordinates: 52.185712°N 0.552605°W

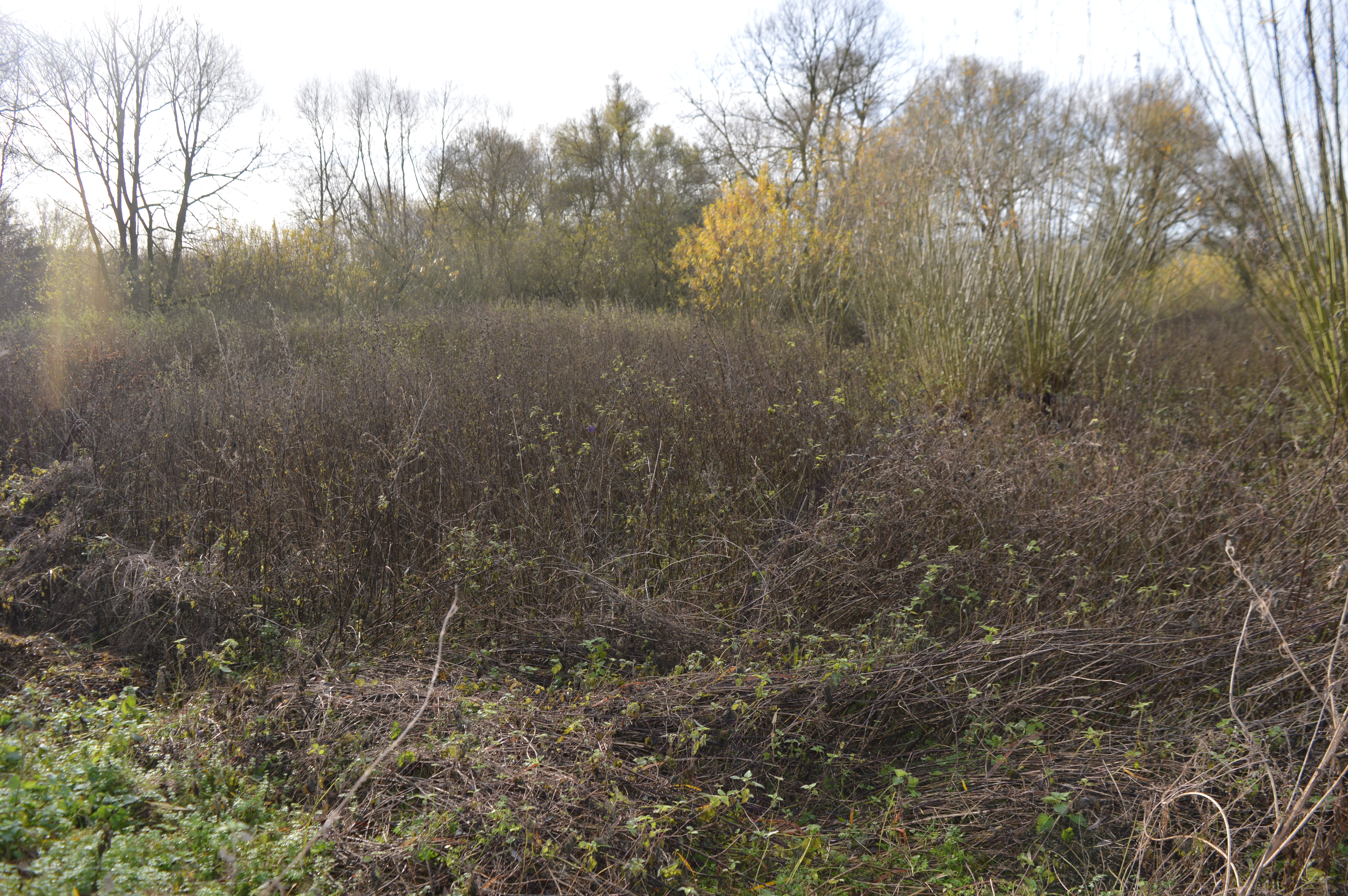

Pavenham Osier Beds is a 1.3 hectare nature reserve south of Pavenham, on the banks of the River Great Ouse, in Bedfordshire. It is managed by the Wildlife Trust for Bedfordshire, Cambridgeshire and Northamptonshire.

This is a wet meadow next to the River Great Ouse, which has the uncommon flower meadow-rue. Osier is a type of willow which is continually cut, stimulating its growth and supplying material for basket weavers. The Trust is continuing the tradition by planting more osiers.

An osier bed is an area where willows were formerly planted and coppiced to produce withies which were used for basket making, fish-traps, and other purposes. The willow species salix viminalis was typically grown for this purpose. Willow rods (cuttings) would be planted, which root easily in moist ground, and the growth of the willow withies would be cut every one or two years.

There is access by a footpath on the left of Mill Lane. There are no footpaths in this small site.
