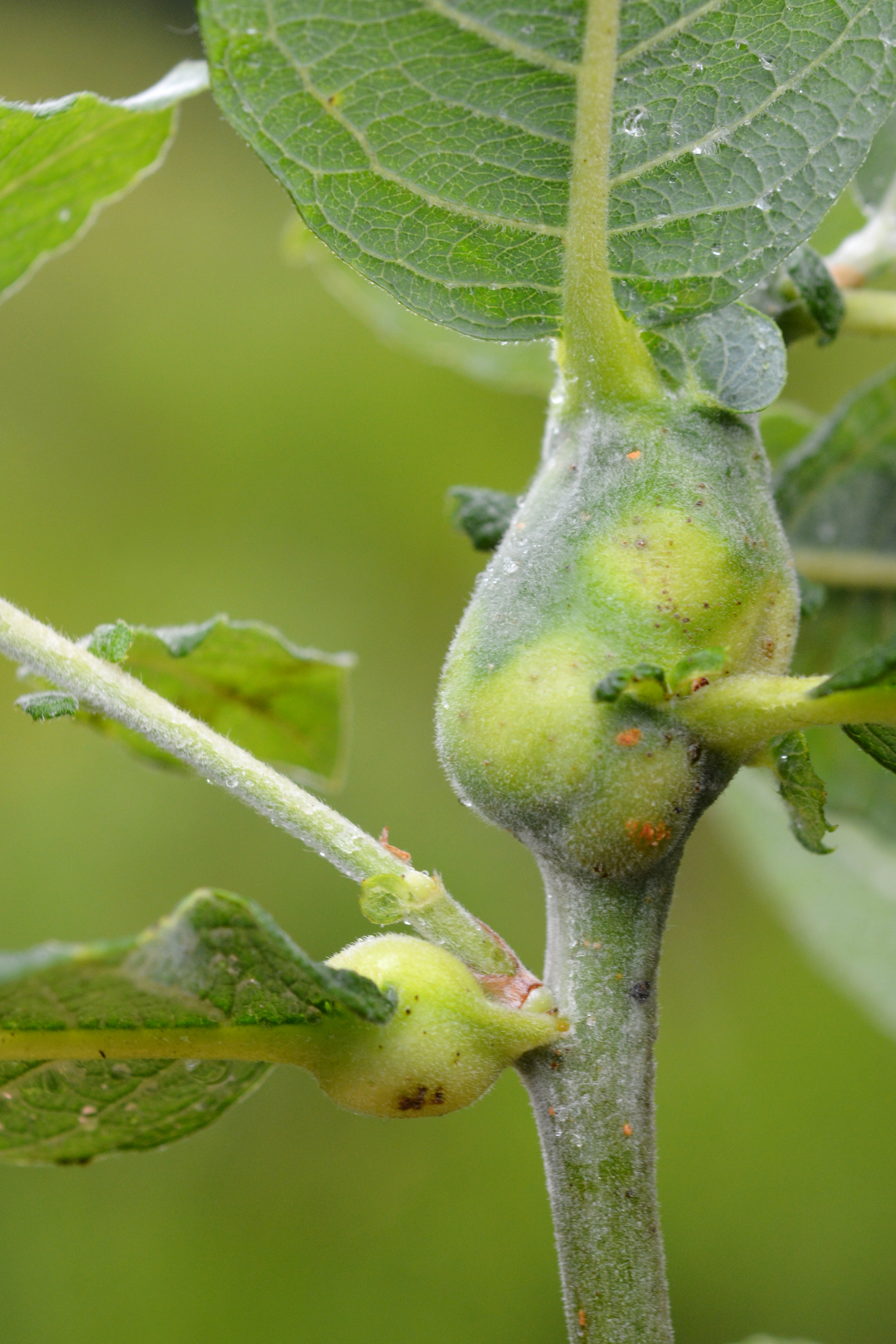

Scientific classification
- Kingdom: Animalia
- Phylum: Arthropoda
- Class: Insecta
- Order: Diptera
- Family: Cecidomyiidae
- Genus: Rabdophaga
- Species: R. salicis

Binomial name
- Rabdophaga salicis (Schrank, 1803)

Synonyms
- Tipula salicis Schrank, 1803; Dasineura salicis Rabdophaga noduli (Ruebsaamen, 1895)

= Rabdophaga salicis =

Species of fly

Rabdophaga salicis is a gall midge which forms galls on sallows (Salix species). It was first described by Franz von Paula Schrank in 1803.

== Description ==
The gall is a smooth, globular or spindle-shaped swelling, usually on a twig or stem and contains larvae or pupae in up to fifty separate chambers. The galls are usually 10–40 mm long and about 10 mm wide and the larvae feed on the pith inside the gall. The gall, does not contain frass, and occasionally occurs on the petiole, midrib, (Note: A similar looking gall, Rabdophaga nervorum, also develops on the midrib; the larva is pale yellow.) or side veins of a leaf. The larvae are pale orange or reddish, over-winter in the gall and pupate in the spring. In Britain the gall is widespread and common and is found on creeping willow (Salix repens), eared willow (S. aurita), grey willow (S. cinerea) and goat willow (S. caprea). Correct identification of the host plant is necessary; the similar looking gall on purple willow (S. purpurea) is Rabdophaga degeerii. Elsewhere the gall has been recorded on mountain willow (S. arbuscula), weeping willow (S. babylonica), European violet willow (S. daphnoides), olive willow (S. elaeagnos), S. excelsa, S. glabra and dark-leaved willow (S. myrsinites).

== Distribution ==
Recorded from Belgium, Great Britain, Luxembourg, the Netherlands and Slovakia.

== Inquilines ==
The inquiline Lestodiplosis gammae has been found in this gall and has also been found in the gall of R. saliciperda.
