= Draper's Osier Bed Stream =

Stream in Berkshire, England

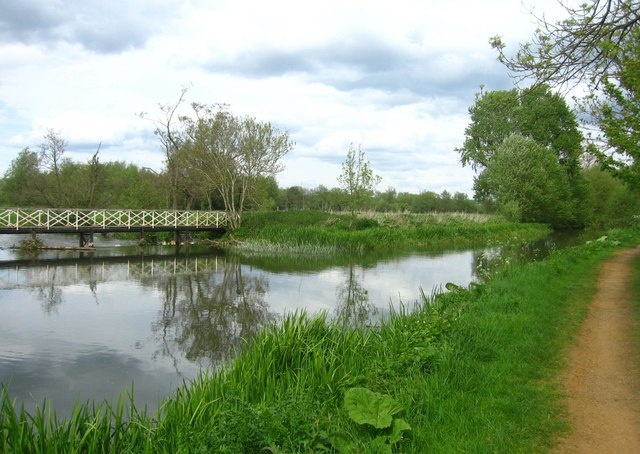

Location
- Country: England
- Counties: Berkshire
- Districts / Boroughs: Theale Parish

Physical characteristics
- Source
  - location: River Kennet, Sulhamstead, Berkshire, United Kingdom
  - coordinates: 51.425758°N 1.086059°W
- Mouth
  - location: River Kennet, Theale, Berkshire, United Kingdom
  - coordinates: 51.431779°N 1.069837°W

Draper's Osier Bed Stream is a small stream in southern England, in the county of Berkshire. It is formed at a weir on a section of the River Kennet running alongside the Kennet and Avon Canal, and travels east for a while, before merging with the Kennet upstream of the head of the Holy Brook stream.

An osier bed is where historically willows were planted and coppiced to produce withies which were used for basket making, fish-traps, and other purposes. The willow species salix viminalis was typically grown for this purpose. Willow rods (cuttings) would be planted, which root easily in moist ground, and the growth of the willow withies would be cut every one or two years.
