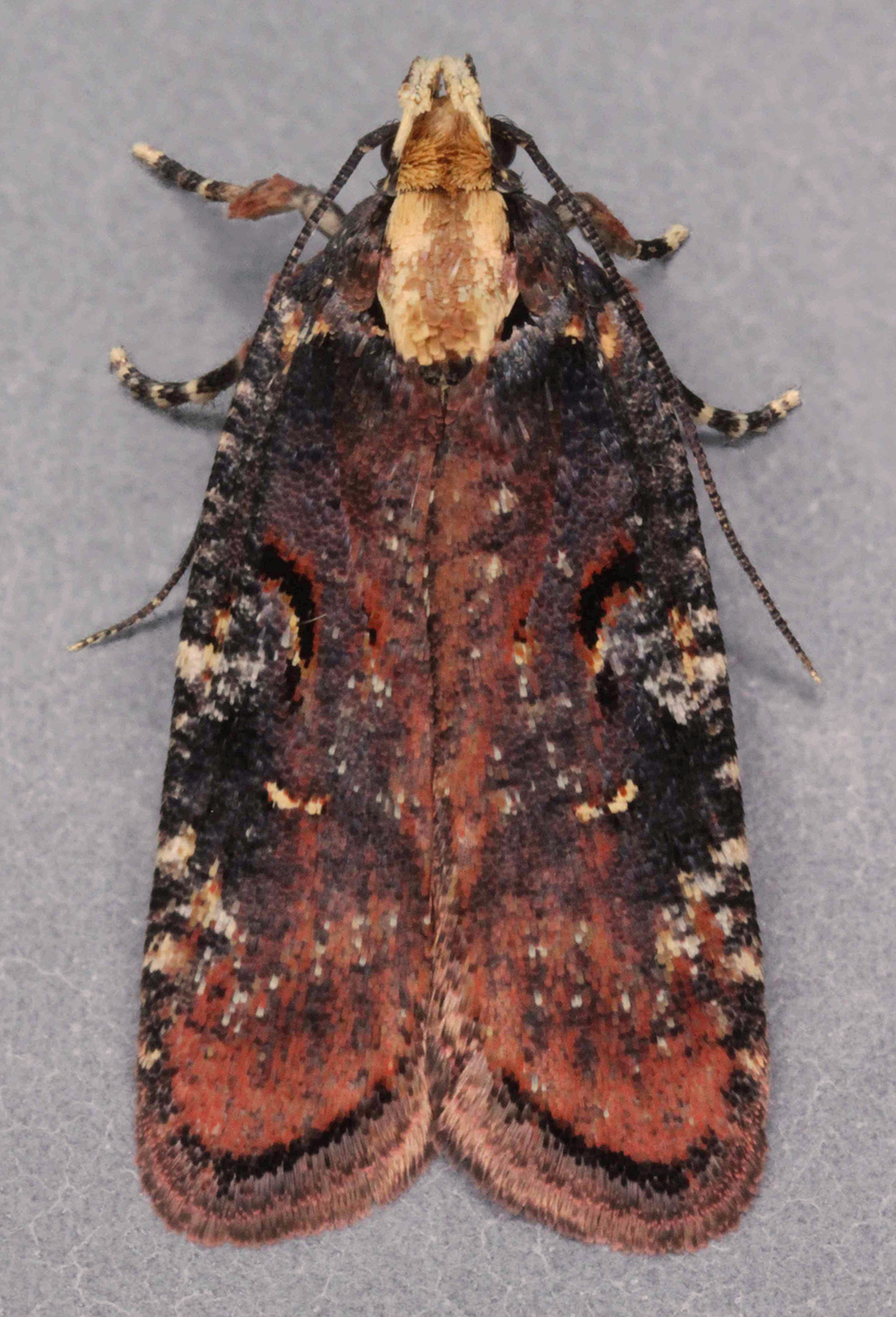

Scientific classification
- Kingdom: Animalia
- Phylum: Arthropoda
- Clade: Pancrustacea
- Class: Insecta
- Order: Lepidoptera
- Family: Depressariidae
- Genus: Agonopterix
- Species: A. liturosa

Binomial name
- Agonopterix liturosa (Haworth, 1811)

Synonyms
- Depressaria liturosa Haworth, 1811; Agonopterix huebneri Bradley, 1966; Tinea liturella Hubner, 1796

= Agonopterix liturosa =

Species of moth

Agonopterix liturosa is a moth of the family Depressariidae. It is found in most of Europe (except most of the Balkan Peninsula). It is also found in the Near East and the eastern part of the Palearctic realm.

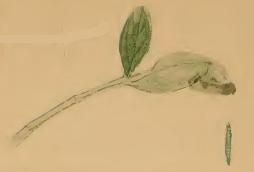
Shoot of Hypericum with apical leaves drawn together by larva

Larva

The wingspan is 17–20 millimetres (0.67–0.79 in). Purple brown forewings and buff thorax and head.Similar species are Agonopterix purpurea and Agonopterix conterminella.

Adults are on wing from July to August.

The larvae feed on Hypericum species. Larvae can be found from May to June.
