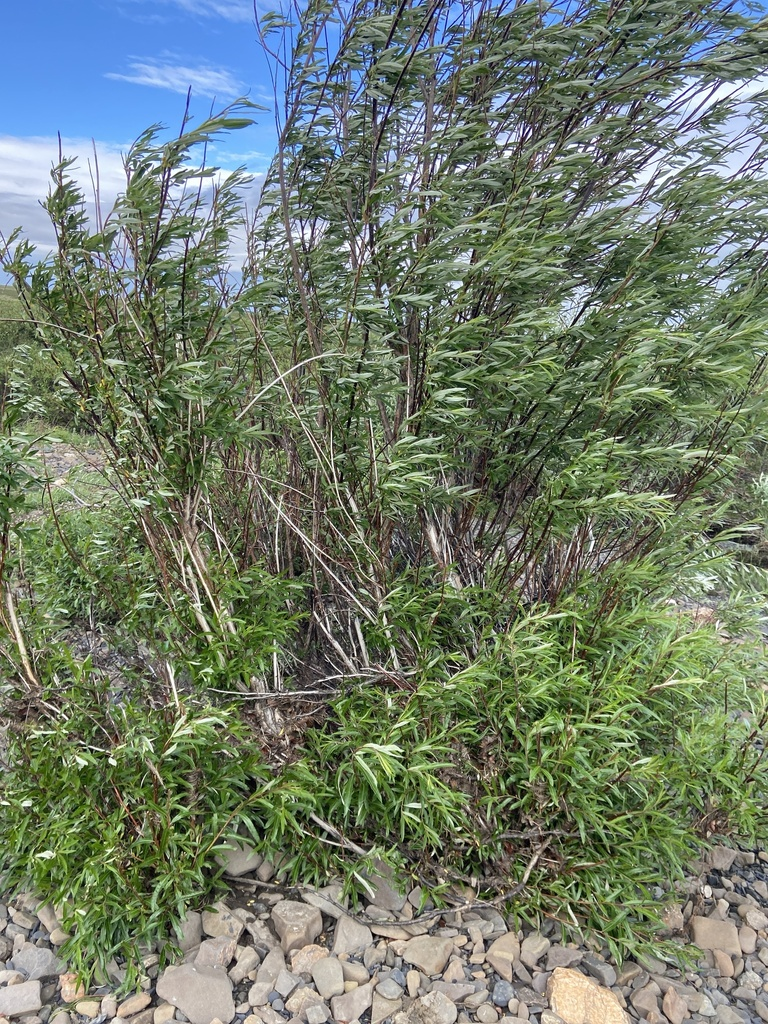

Conservation status
- Least Concern (IUCN 3.1)

Scientific classification
- Kingdom: Plantae
- Clade: Tracheophytes
- Clade: Angiosperms
- Clade: Eudicots
- Clade: Rosids
- Order: Malpighiales
- Family: Salicaceae
- Genus: Salix
- Species: S. schwerinii

Binomial name
- Salix schwerinii E. Wolf

= Salix schwerinii =

Species of willow

Salix schwerinii, the narrow-leaf willow, is a species of willow native to northeastern Asia (from Kolyma to northeastern China). It is a shrub or a tree 10 to 15 m (33 to 49 ft) m high with long and exceptionally narrow leaves, similar and closely related to Salix viminalis.
