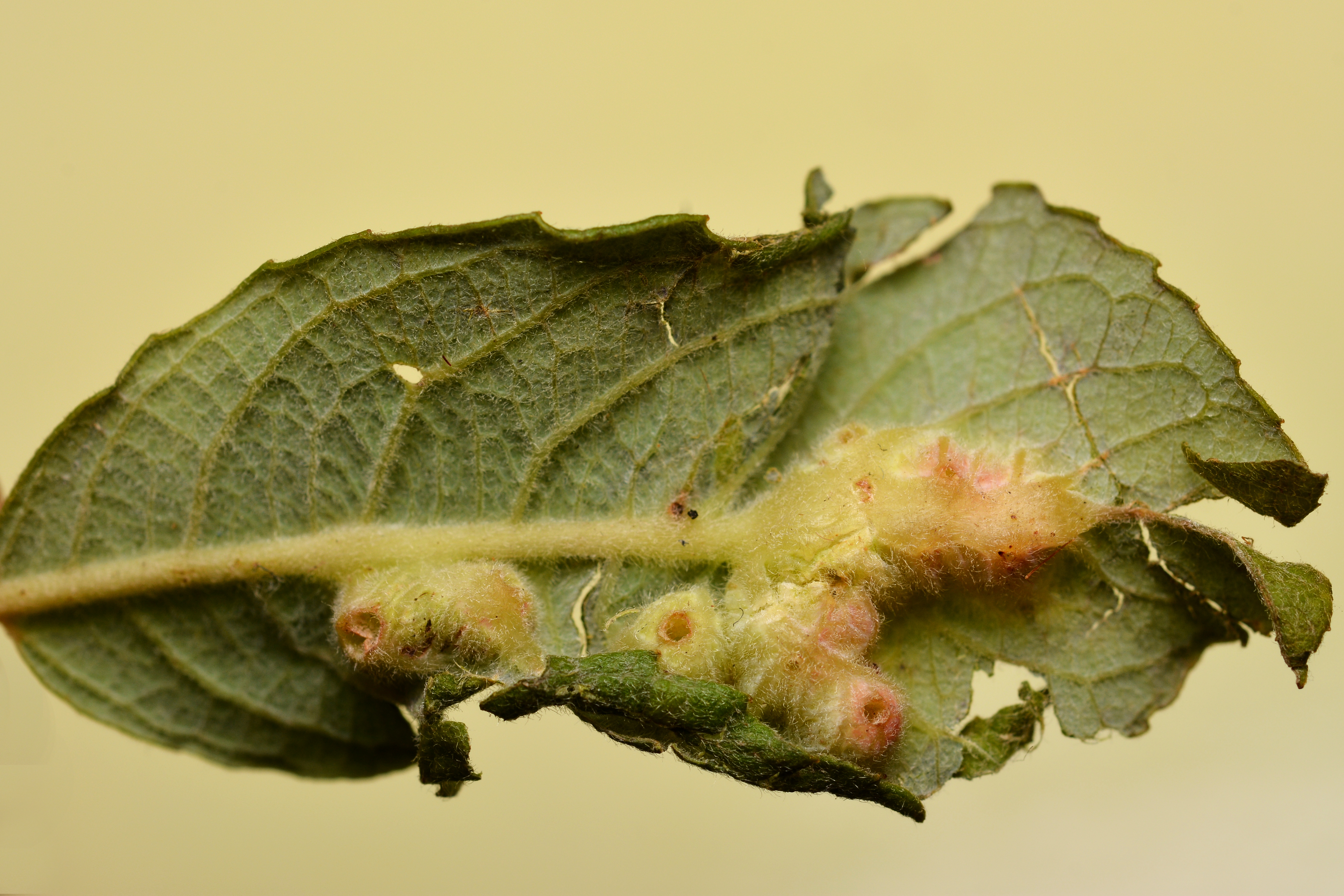

Scientific classification
- Kingdom: Animalia
- Phylum: Arthropoda
- Class: Insecta
- Order: Diptera
- Family: Cecidomyiidae
- Genus: Iteomyia
- Species: I. major

Binomial name
- Iteomyia major (Kieffer, 1889)

Synonyms
- Oligotrophus major Kieffer, 1889

= Iteomyia major =

Species of fly

Iteomyia major is a gall midge which forms galls on willows (Salix species). It was first described by Jean-Jacques Kieffer in 1889.

== Description of the gall ==
The gall is a coalesced group of 2–10 hard round galls, on the midrib or side vein and are equally prominent on either side of the leaf. Each gall has a single larva, initially white and later orange or red. There is a single generation each year and pupation takes place in the soil. Females prefer to lay their eggs on the ″broad-leaf willows″ and the galls are found on sallows, or their hybrids, which include bay willow (S. pentandra), bitter willow (S. elaeagnos), dark-leaved willow (S. myrsinifolia), eared willow (S. aurita), goat willow (S. caprea), gray willow (S. glauca), grey willow (S. cinerea), purple willow (S. purpurea), tea-leaved willow (S. phylicifolia) and woolly willow (S. lanata).

=== Similar species ===
Iteomyia capreae galls are small, hard, green pouches, up to 4 mm in diameter and, as they mature, have a reddish or purplish tinge. They are not as prominent on the lower leaf surface, having red-rimmed conical pores.

== Distribution ==
Recorded from Great Britain (England, Scotland and Wales) and the Netherlands.
