= Osier bed =

Location where historically willows were planted and harvested to produce withies

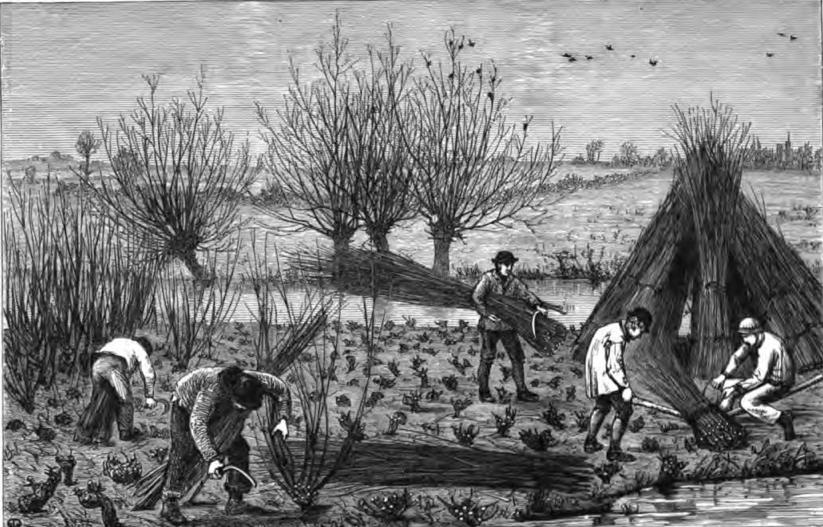
Workers cut willows in an osier bed, in an image published in 1875.

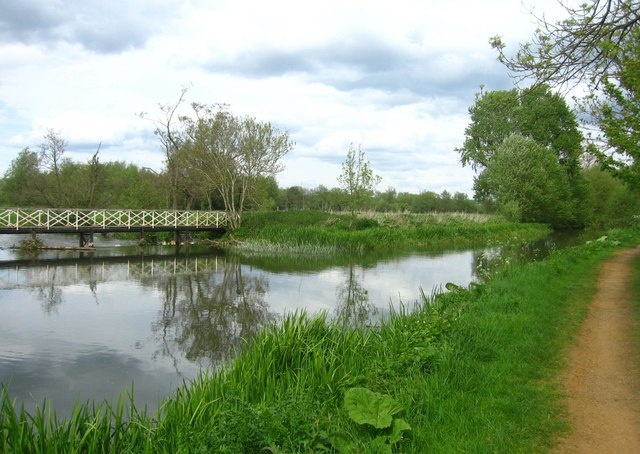
Draper's Osier Bed Stream in Berkshire, United Kingdom - showing typical osier bed geography on the banks of the Kennet & Avon Canal

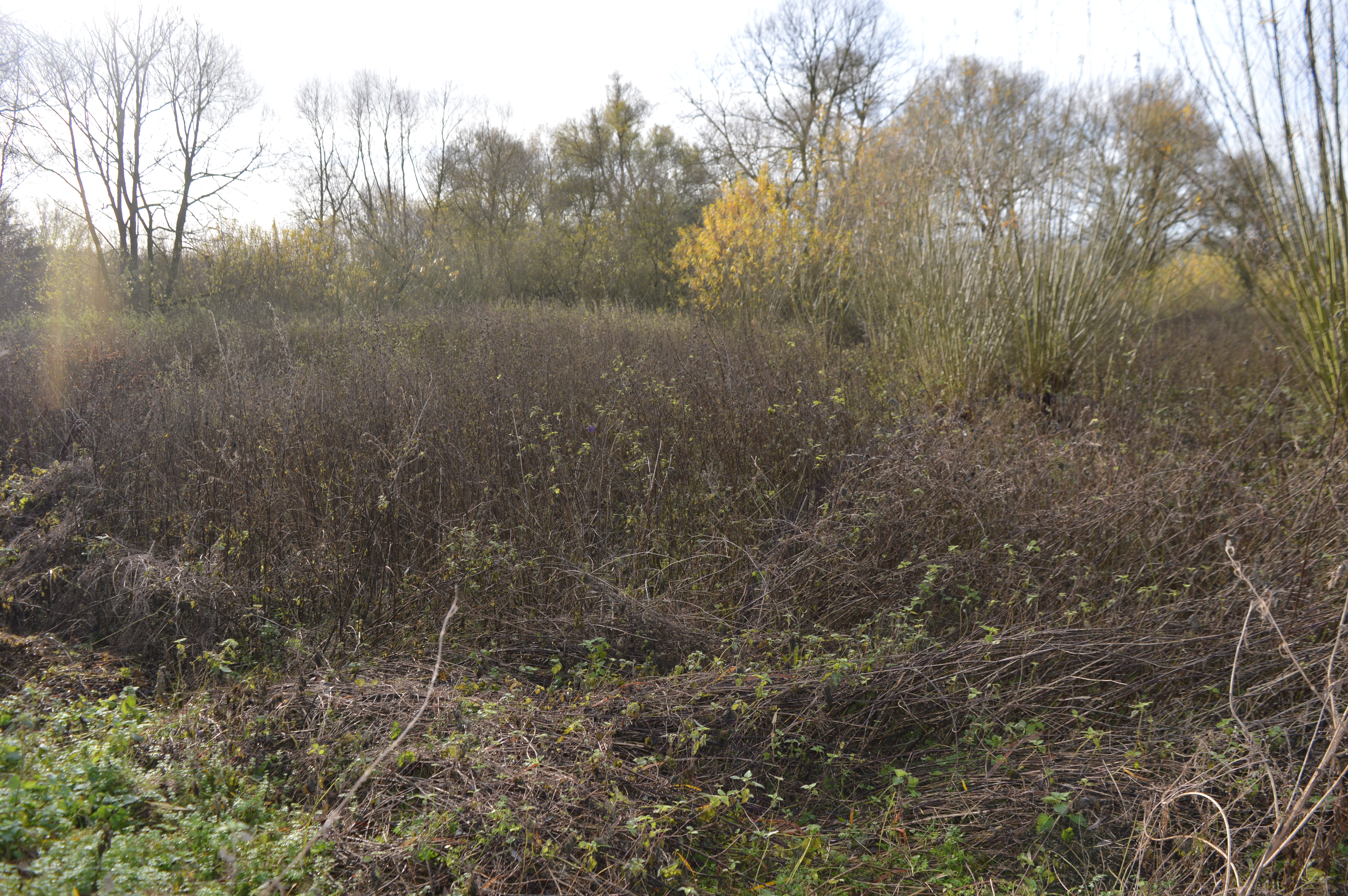
Pavenham Osier Beds, in Bedfordshire, United Kingdom

An osier bed or osiery is where historically willows were planted and coppiced to produce withies, which were used for basket making, fish-traps, and other purposes. The willow species Salix viminalis, known as the "common osier" was typically, although not exclusively, grown for this purpose. The marshy fringes of rivers, especially those which were often flooded and those with small islands, aits, eyots, or holts, were the most common locations for osier beds. Willow rods (cuttings) would be planted, which root easily in moist ground, and the growth of the willow withies would be cut every one or two years.

Osier beds and basket-weaving using willow were a significant industry in Great Britain until the early 20th Century, when industrial machinery and the import of cheaper materials made them unprofitable and commercially unviable.
