= Rabdophaga roskami =

Scientific classification
- Kingdom: Animalia
- Phylum: Arthropoda
- Class: Insecta
- Order: Diptera
- Family: Cecidomyiidae
- Genus: Rabdophaga
- Species: R. roskami

Binomial name
- Rabdophaga roskami Stelter, 1989

Synonyms
- Rhabdophaga roskami Stelter, 1989

Species of fly

Rabdophaga roskami is a gall midge which may form galls on common ossier (Salix viminalis) or, the larva live in the galls formed by R. marginemtorquens. It was first described by H Stelter in 1989.

== Appearance of the gall ==
There is some uncertainty as to whether R. roskami makes galls on Salix viminalis or is an inquiline with the larva living in the galls of R. marginemtorquens. The possible gall is a short, downward, hairless, roll containing a cream or light-reddish larva on S. viminalis. Larvae of R. marginemtorquens are yellowish-red or orange.

== Distribution ==
Recorded from Germany and possibly from Great Britain.
