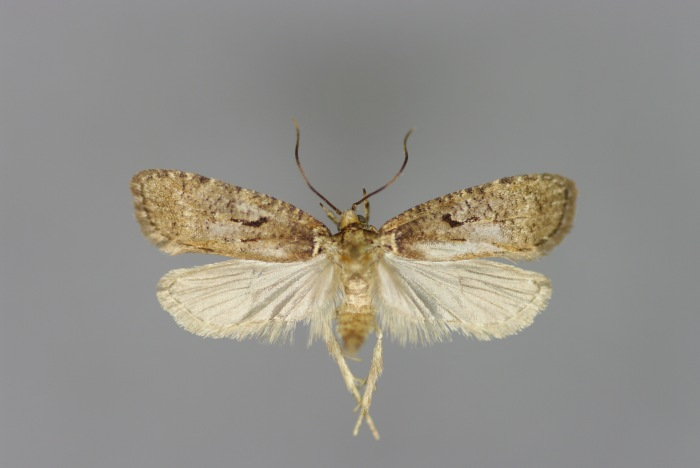

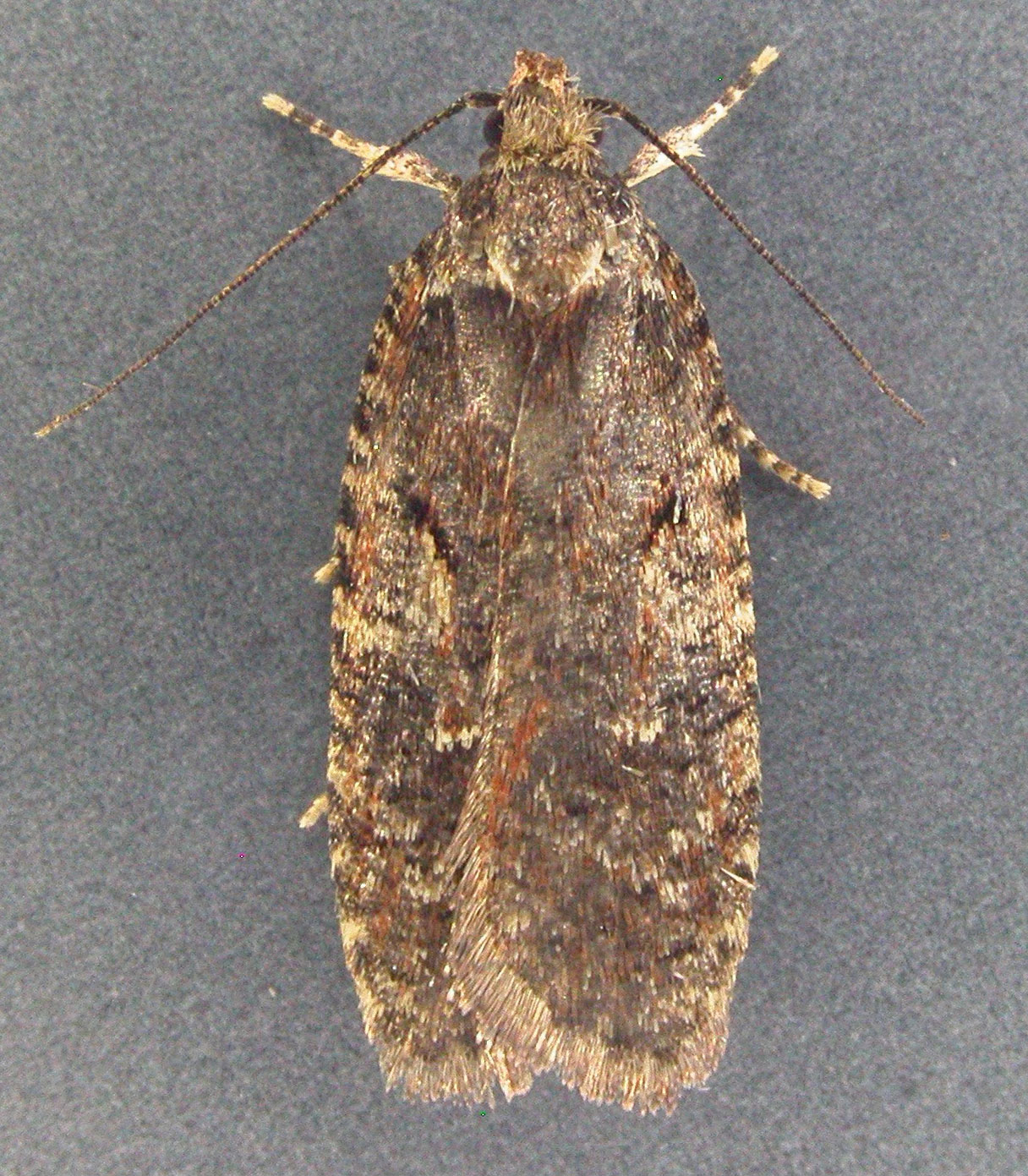

Scientific classification
- Kingdom: Animalia
- Phylum: Arthropoda
- Clade: Pancrustacea
- Class: Insecta
- Order: Lepidoptera
- Family: Depressariidae
- Genus: Agonopterix
- Species: A. conterminella

Binomial name
- Agonopterix conterminella (Zeller, 1839)

Synonyms
- Depressaria conterminella Zeller, 1839

= Agonopterix conterminella =

Species of moth

Agonopterix conterminella is a moth of the family Depressariidae which is found in Asia, Europe and North America. It was described by Philipp Christoph Zeller in 1839 from a specimen found in Augsburg, Germany. The larvae feed on the terminal shoots of willows.

== Imago ==
The wingspan is 18–21 mm. The head and thorax are pale ochreous-yellowish, patagia brownish. Forewings crimson fuscous, disc suffused with fuscous, more or less mixed with dark fuscous, with some yellow-whitish scales, sometimes forming spots on costa; base yellow-whitish, enclosing a dark dorsal mark; first discal stigma forming an oblique curved black mark, sometimes followed by yellow-whitish scales, second yellow-whitish. Hindwings whitish-fuscous. The larva is light green; dots black; head yellow-brownish

Adults are on wing from June to September, fly at night and come to light.

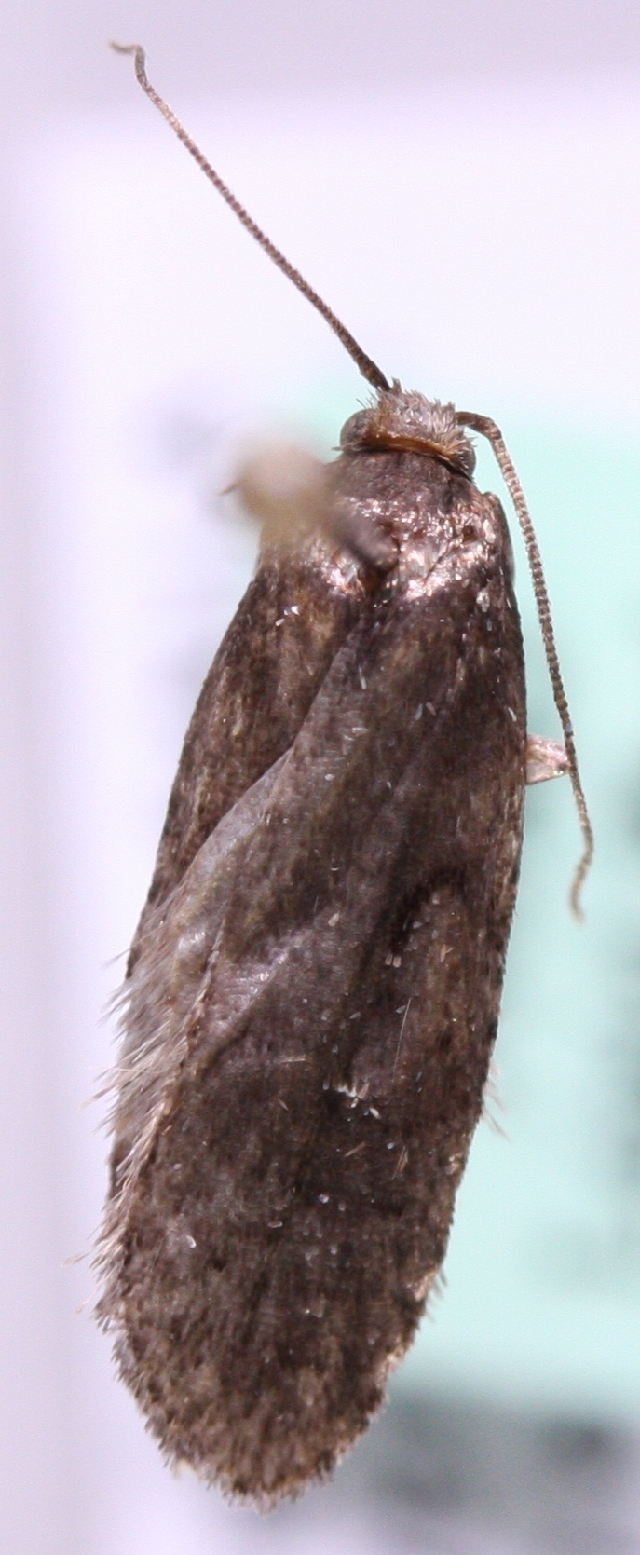

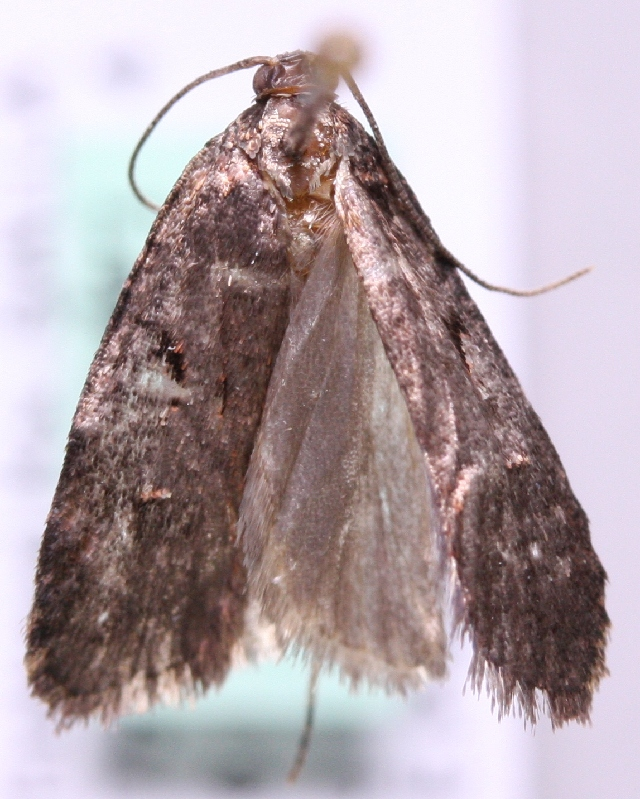

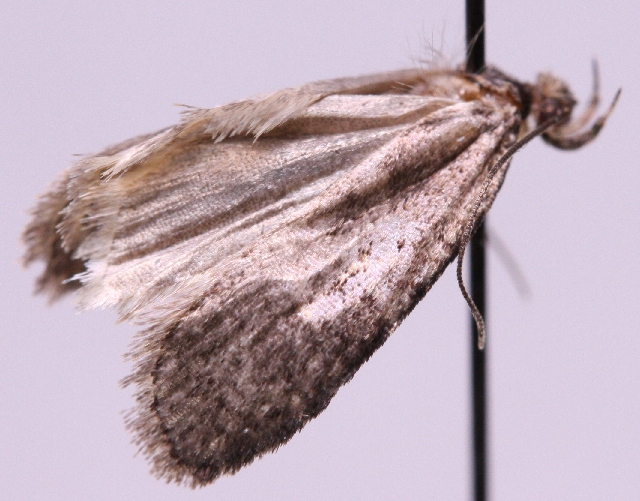

=== Ova ===
Eggs are laid on willows (Salix species). Known species include white willow (S. alba), eared willow (S. aurita), goat willow (S. caprea). grey willow (S. cinerea), crack willow (S. fragilis), creeping willow (S. repens) almond willow (S. triandra) and osier (S. viminalis).

=== Larva ===
The head of the larva is yellowish-brown and the body is pale green and the prothoracic plate is pale green. They feed on the terminal shoots of Salix species in May and June.

=== Pupa ===
In a cocoon in detritus or earth in June and July.

== Distribution ==
It is found in most of Europe, except the Iberian Peninsula and most of the Balkan Peninsula. The range extends to Japan. The species was recently reported from North America, with records from British Columbia and Ontario.
