= Year of the Artist =

UK arts initiative

Year of the Artist (YOTA) was a nationwide scheme organised by the ten English Regional Arts Boards to fund residencies by artists in new and unusual settings. The scheme ran from June 2000 to May 2001 and had the slogan "1,000 artists in 1,000 places". Work commissioned includes the Willow Man sculpture located by the M5 motorway in Somerset.
