= Rabdophaga saliciperda =

Scientific classification
- Kingdom: Animalia
- Phylum: Arthropoda
- Class: Insecta
- Order: Diptera
- Family: Cecidomyiidae
- Genus: Rabdophaga
- Species: R. saliciperda

Binomial name
- Rabdophaga saliciperda (Dufour, 1841)

Synonyms
- Dasineura saliciperda Helicomyia saliciperda

Species of fly

Rabdophaga saliciperda is a species of gall midges which forms galls on willows (Salix species). It was first described by Léon Jean Marie Dufour in 1841.

== Description ==
The woody, irregular swellings are on the twigs of willows with the larval chambers just below the bark. Larvae are in individual chambers and are described as yellowish-orange, or greenish yellow to white or reddish depending on the authority. Larvae prepare emergence windows before pupating. Galls have been recorded on Salix alba, S. aurita, S. aurita x cinerea, S. cinerea subsp. oleifolia, S. caprea, Salix × fragilis and S. repens.

== Distribution ==
Has been recorded from Europe, Japan and Russia.

== Inquilines ==
The inquiline Lestodiplosis gammae has also been found in this gall and the gall of R. salicis.
