= Serena de la Hey =

Kenyan-British sculptor (born 1967)

- Born: 1967 (age 58–59); Eldoret, Kenya
- Occupation: Sculptor
- Notable work: The Willow Man (2001)

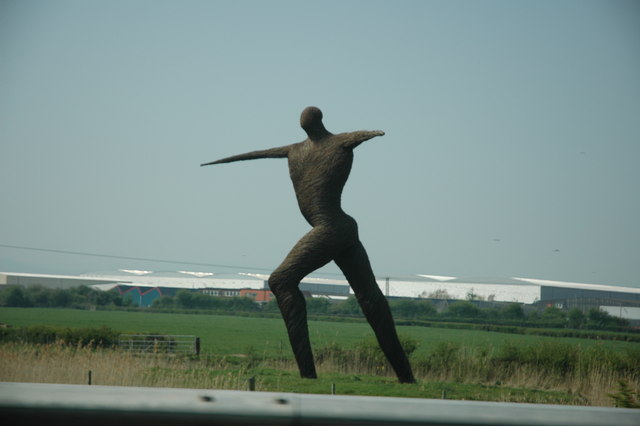
Serena de la Hey: The Willow Man (2001)

Serena de la Hey (born 1967) is a Kenyan-born British sculptor who has travelled widely but lived in Somerset since the early 1990s. She is best known for her 40-foot high Willow Man near Bridgwater which she completed in the autumn of 2001.

== Biography ==
Born in 1967 in Eldoret, Kenya, de la Hey spent her early childhood on farms in Australia. After graduating from Falmouth Art College, she settled in Somerset where she embarked on early sculpting work using willow from the Somerset Levels.

De la Hey first used willow for sculpting human forms in 1992 when she created running wicker figures in the Nevada Desert. Since the early 1990s, she has created wicker figures of people and animals in her studio in Stoke Gregory near Taunton. She considers willow to be "fluid, a quick way of getting into an idea". She has produced a variety of figures for private clients, mostly for decorating homes or gardens. In 1999, in collaboration with Fernando Martin, she created a figure for the Glastonbury Festival which was burnt as part of a pyrotechnic display on the last night.

In 2000, South West Arts commissioned her to create Willow Man, a 40-foot high wicker sculpture close to the M5 Motorway near Bridgwater. It took her four weeks to complete the figure, using local willow supported by a metal structure. It was completed in September 2000. In May 2001, vandals burnt the sculpture, leaving only the metal frame. Thanks to a campaign to have the figure restored, in October 2001, de la Hey completed her second version, this time interweaving steel wire with the willow. In addition, the figure was protected by an acre of weedbed. Although originally designed to last just three years, the Willow Man has been repaired several times over the years by de la Hey and still stands intact. Repairs are however costly and de la Hey is now wondering whether her sculpture should be redesigned to save on maintenance costs.
