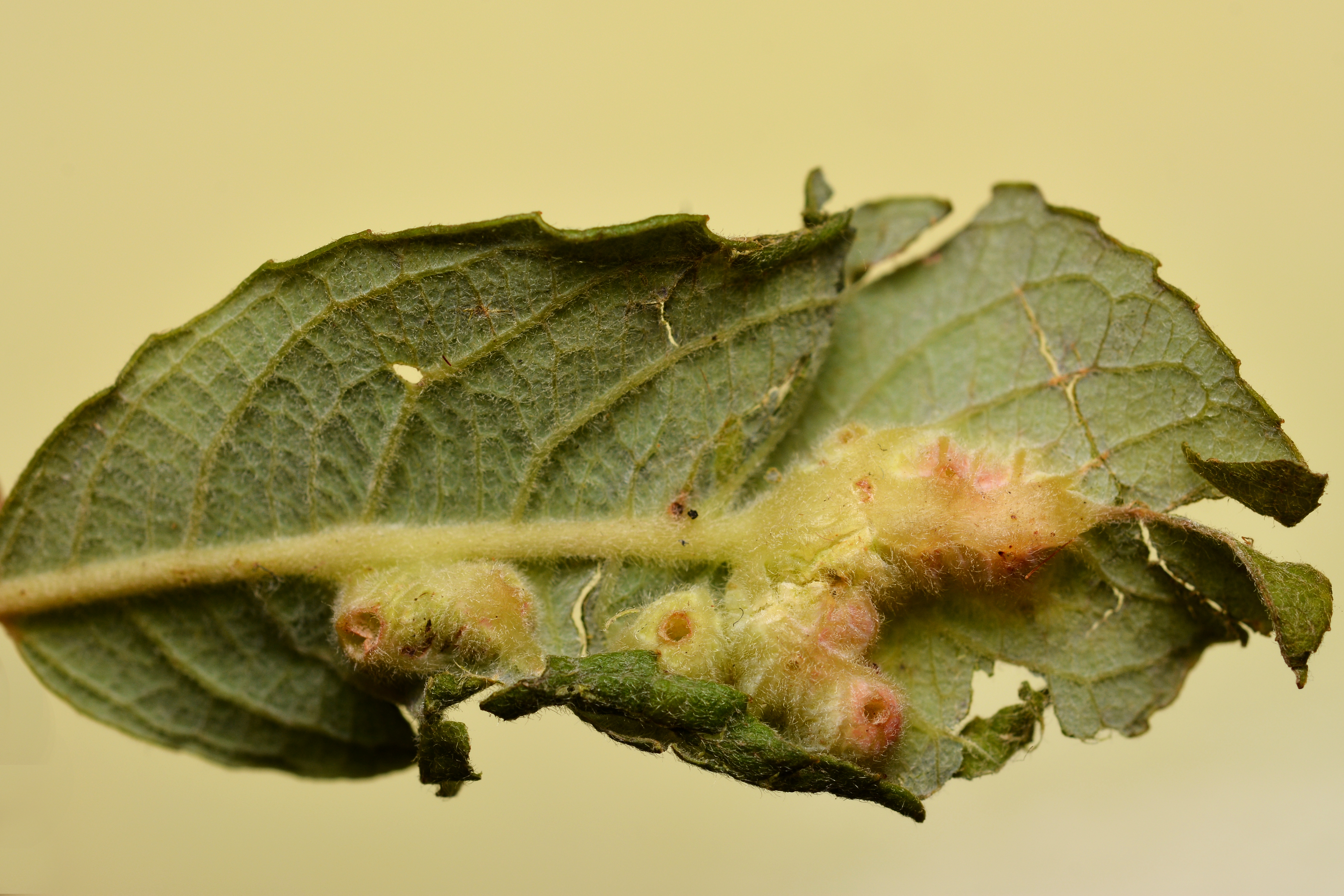
- Leaf galls caused by Iteomyia major

Scientific classification
- Domain: Eukaryota
- Kingdom: Animalia
- Phylum: Arthropoda
- Class: Insecta
- Order: Diptera
- Family: Cecidomyiidae
- Subfamily: Cecidomyiinae
- Supertribe: Lasiopteridi
- Tribe: Oligotrophini
- Genus: Iteomyia; Kieffer, 1913

= Iteomyia =

Genus of flies

Iteomyia is a genus of gall midges in the family Cecidomyiidae.

== Species ==
- Iteomyia capreae (Winnertz, 1853)
- Iteomyia major (Kieffer, 1889)
- Iteomyia peyerimhofi (Kieffer, 1909)
- Iteomyia salicifolia (Felt, 1910)
- Iteomyia salicisverruca (Osten Sacken, 1878)
