= Willow Man =

Outdoor sculpture in Somerset, England

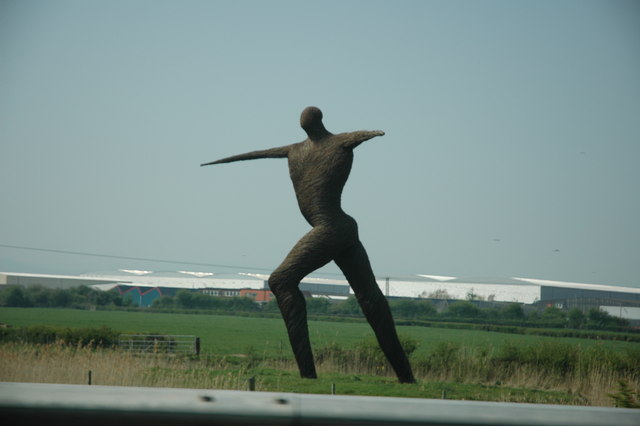
- In 2007
- Artist: Serena de la Hey
- Year: 2000
- Type: Willow sculpture woven on a steel frame
- Dimensions: 40 ft (12 m) tall 16 ft (5 m) span
- Location: Bridgwater, Somerset, England; 51°09′02″N 2°58′52″W

Willow Man is a large outdoor sculpture by Serena de la Hey. It is in a field to the west of the M5 motorway, near Bridgwater in Somerset, South West England, near to the Bristol to Exeter railway line and south of junction 23 of the motorway. It stands 40 feet (12 m), with a 16-foot (5 m) arm span, and is made of black maul willow withies woven over a 3-tonne steel frame.

Willow Man was commissioned by South West Arts, for the Year of the Artist, and the Moate family the land owner. The sculpture, which cost £15,000 (equivalent to about £29,000 in 2025), was unveiled in September 2000. It marks the millennium and celebrates the role of willow in the ecology and craft tradition of the Somerset Levels.

The first sculpture was burnt down in an arson attack on 8 May 2001. The sculpture was rebuilt by the same artist in October 2001, and a 130-foot (40 m) circular moat was excavated around it as a precaution against further attacks.

A notable landmark, it can be described as a somehow permanent Wicker man sculpture. The sculpture is popularly known as Withy Man, or Angel of the South in reference to Antony Gormley's sculpture Angel of the North. The name Angel of the South is now commonly used also as the unofficial title for a proposed colossal sculpture in Ebbsfleet.

In September 2006, Willow Man received "a £20,000 hair cut". The sculptor Serena de la Hey said that she thought many local birds had been using the material for their nests. When the artist saw her sculpture she was "shocked to see the wear and tear".

In 2018, an appeal to raise funds for the repair of the structure failed to meet its target. By 2021, the structure had further deteriorated with the head and arms having lost form.

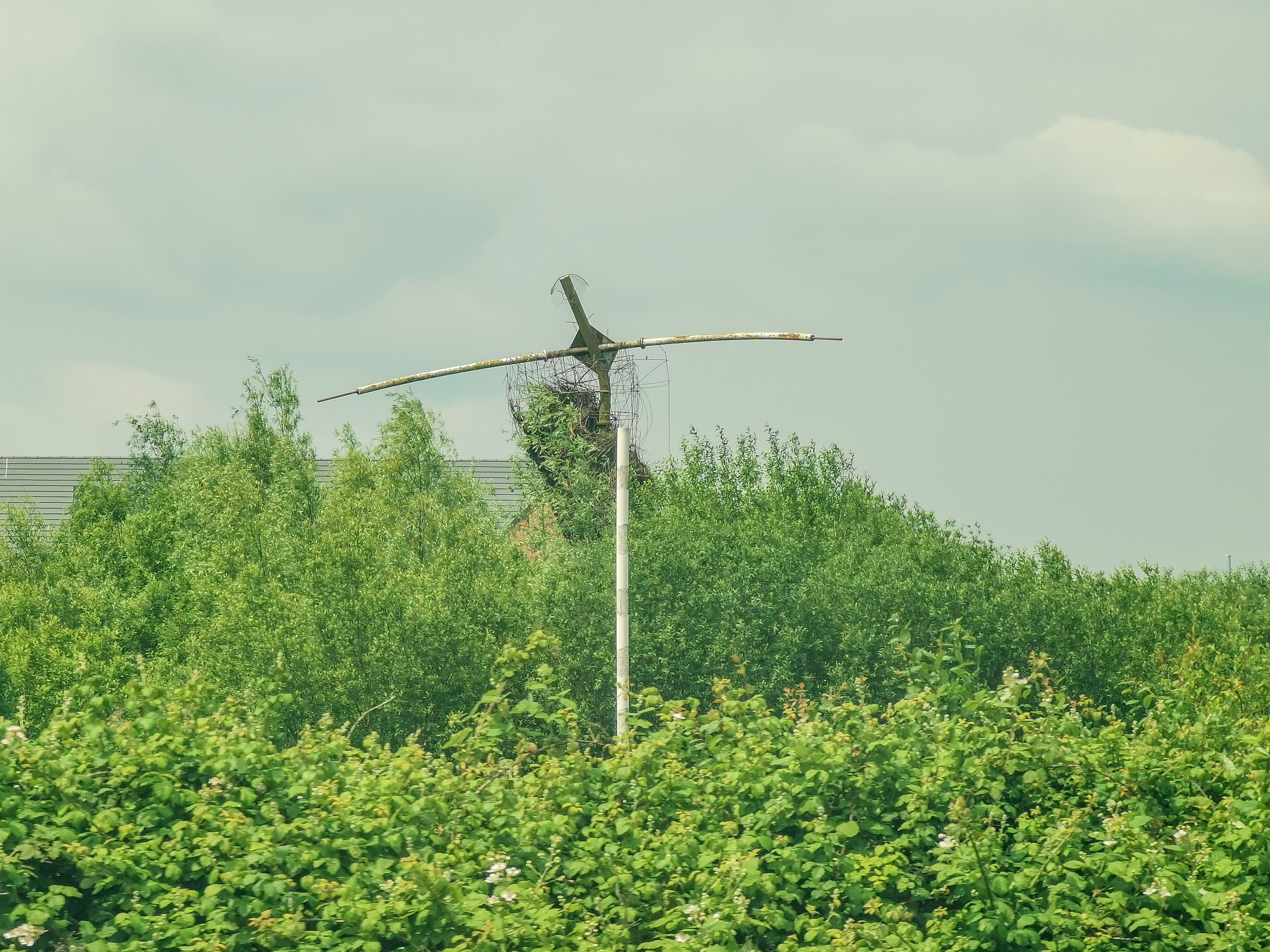
The remains in 2024

As of 2024, the wicker structure is almost destroyed and only the metal skeleton remains. There is no approved plan for its renovation.

== See also ==
- List of tallest statues
