= Salix nipponica =

Conservation status
- Least Concern (IUCN 3.1)

Scientific classification
- Kingdom: Plantae
- Clade: Tracheophytes
- Clade: Angiosperms
- Clade: Eudicots
- Clade: Rosids
- Order: Malpighiales
- Family: Salicaceae
- Genus: Salix
- Species: S. nipponica

Binomial name
- Salix nipponica Franch. & Sav.

Species of willow

Salix nipponica is a species of willow native to Eastern Asia.

== Range ==
It is found along rivers and streams in forest regions; near sea level to 500 m. It is found in the Chinese provinces of Hebei, Heilongjiang, Hunan, Jiangsu, Jilin, Liaoning, E Nei Mongol, Shandong, Xizang, Zhejiang. It is also found in Japan, Korea, Mongolia, and the Russian Far East.

== Taxonomy ==
Salix nipponica was formerly treated as S. triandra var. nipponica (Franch. & Savatier) but it is now considered a distinct species.
