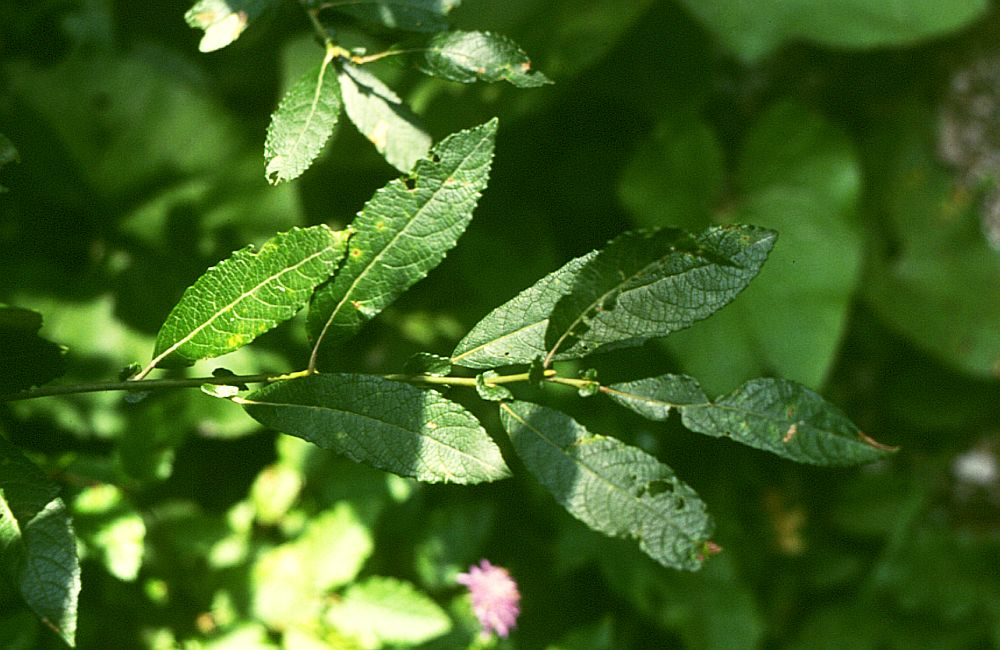

Conservation status
- Least Concern (IUCN 3.1)

Scientific classification
- Kingdom: Plantae
- Clade: Tracheophytes
- Clade: Angiosperms
- Clade: Eudicots
- Clade: Rosids
- Order: Malpighiales
- Family: Salicaceae
- Genus: Salix
- Species: S. appendiculata

Binomial name
- Salix appendiculata Vill.

= Salix appendiculata =

Plant in the genus of willows

Salix appendiculata is a plant from the willow genus (Salix). They can be found in France, Italy, Central and Eastern Europe, and on the Balkan Peninsula.

== Description ==
The large-leaved willow is a 2 to 6 meter high shrub or tree with a rounded crown. The branches are gray-green, dark brown or red-brown and show indistinct stripes. The bark of young thin twigs is downy hairy and later becomes more or less bare.

The leaves are divided into a petiole and a leaf blade. The petiole is about 1 inch long. The simple leaf blade is 4 to 18 centimeters long and 3 to 5 centimeters wide obovate to obovate-lanceolate, pointed and gradually narrowed towards the base. The leaf margin is notched or serrated. The upper side of the leaf is deep green, wrinkled and bare except for the leaf veins, the underside of the leaf is scattered hairy with strongly protruding leaf veins. There are 12 to 15 pairs of nerves. The stipules are heart- or kidney-shaped.

The flowers are arranged in sitting or up to 5 millimeters long stalked, 2 to 3 centimeters long catkins. Two hairy stamens are formed at the base of each individual flower. The ovary is stalked and densely hairy with a distinct stylus and divided stigma. The bracts are small, hairy white, light at the base, and dark brown to black and long bearded towards the tip. The catkins appear from April and May just before or with the leaves.

The number of chromosomes is 2n = 38.

== Range ==
The natural range of the large-leaved willow are the mountains of Central and Eastern Europe. They are also found in France, Italy and the Balkan Peninsula. There it grows in mountain forests and alpine shrub regions at heights of up to 1900 meters on fresh to moist, acidic to neutral, sandy-humic, gravelly or rocky, shallow soils in sunny to sunny, summer-cool and winter-cold locations. It is a characteristic species of Salicetum appendiculatae from the Association Adenostylion. In the Allgäu Alps, it rises in Vorarlberg near Pellingerköpfleand between Ifenhütte and Hahnenköpfle at Hohen Ifen up to 2000 meters above sea level.

== Taxonomy ==
The large-leaved willow (Salix appendiculata) is a species from the genus of willow (Salix) within the willow family (Salicaceae). The first description was in 1789 by Dominique Villars in his work Histoire Des Plantes de Dauphine. A synonym for Salix appendiculata Vill. is Salix grandifolia Ser.

== Literature ==
- Andreas Roloff, Andreas Bärtels: Flora of the woods. Purpose, properties and use. 3rd, corrected edition. Eugen Ulmer, Stuttgart (Hohenheim) 2008, ISBN 978-3-8001-5614-6, pp. 574 .
- Jost Fitschen: Woody flora. 12th, revised and expanded edition. Quelle & Meyer, Wiebelsheim 2007, ISBN 3-494-01422-1, p. 767 .
- Mark Bachhofer, Joachim Mayer: The new cosmos tree guide. 370 trees and bushes from Central Europe. Franckh-Kosmos, Stuttgart 2006, ISBN 978-3-440-11930-3, p. 88 .
