= Withy =

Strong flexible willow stem

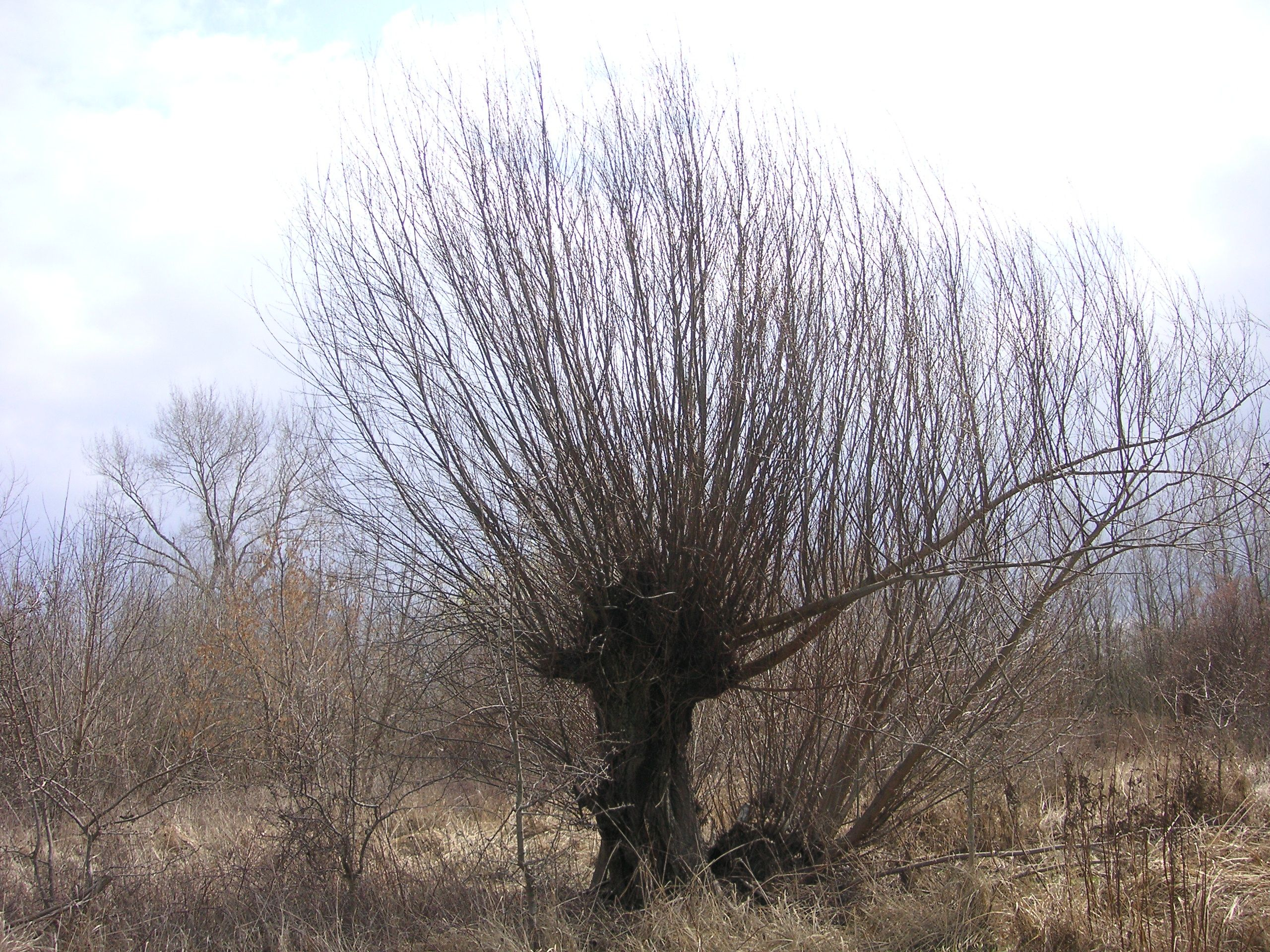
A pollarded willow with a crop of withies ready for harvest

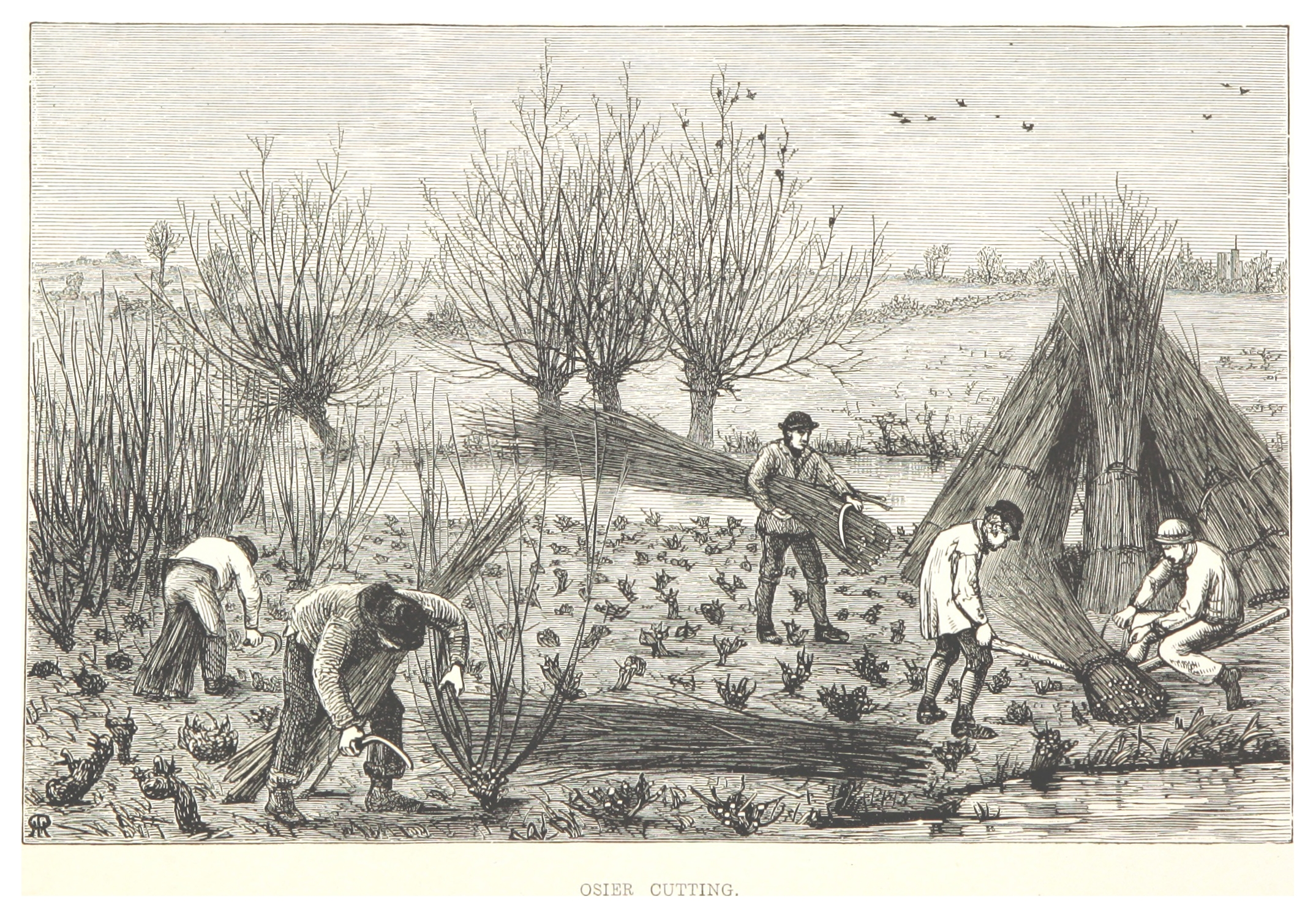
Cutting and stacking withies

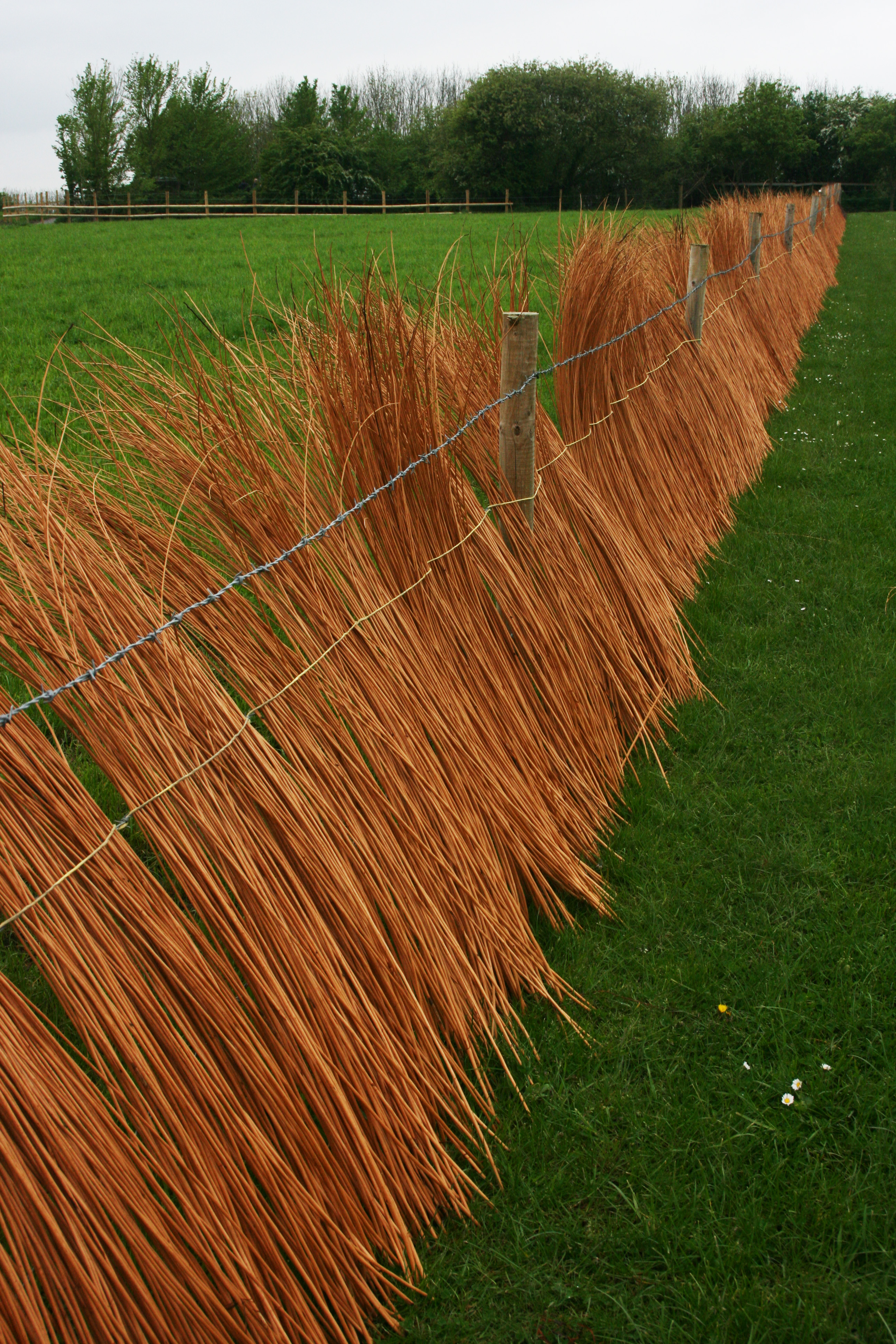
Drying withies

A withy or withe (also willow and osier) is a strong flexible willow stem, typically used in thatching, basketmaking, gardening and for constructing woven wattle hurdles. The term is also used to refer to any type of flexible rod of natural wood used in rural crafts such as hazel or ash created through coppicing or pollarding.

Several species and hybrid cultivars of willows (often known as osiers) are grown for withy production; typical species include Salix acutifolia, Salix daphnoides, Salix × mollissima, Salix purpurea, Salix triandra, and Salix viminalis.

Places such as Wythenshawe and Withy Grove (both in Manchester) take their names from the willow woods and groves that grew there in earlier times. The Somerset Levels remain the only area in the UK growing basket willow commercially.

== Use in water navigation ==
Withies were used to mark minor tidal channels in UK harbours and estuaries. In many places they remain in use as of 2015 and are often marked on navigation charts. At high tide the tops of a line of withies stuck in the mud on one or both sides of a channel will show above water to indicate where the deeper water lies. Note the images of international navigation-chart symbols for withies (port and starboard).

NChart-Symbol INT Withy Port

NChart-Symbol INT Withy Starboard

== See also ==
- "The Bitter Withy", a folk song
- Coppicing
- Fascine
- Widmore, London, a suburb named for the withy
- Willow Man, a sculpture in England
