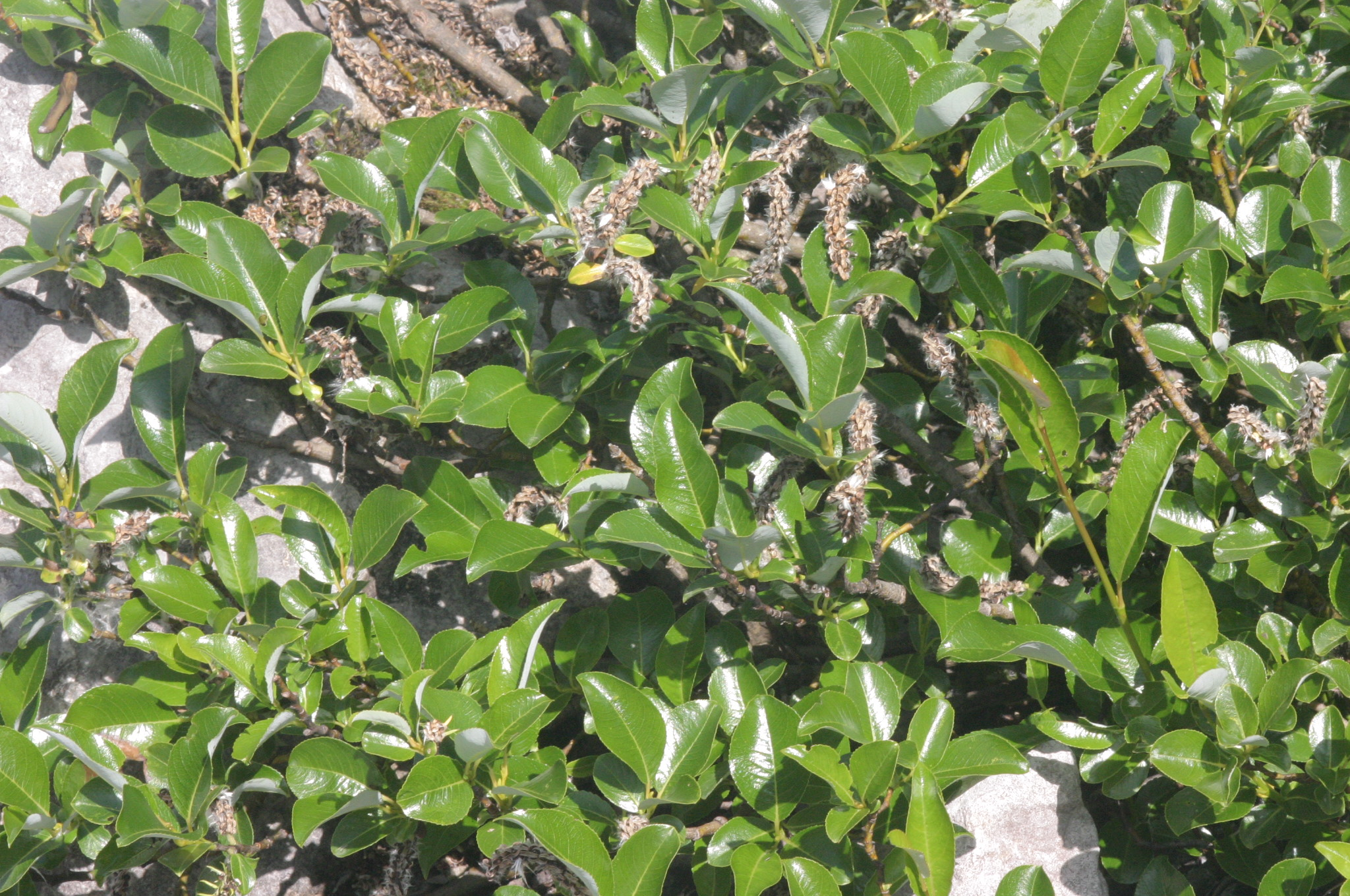

Conservation status
- Least Concern (IUCN 3.1)

Scientific classification
- Kingdom: Plantae
- Clade: Tracheophytes
- Clade: Angiosperms
- Clade: Eudicots
- Clade: Rosids
- Order: Malpighiales
- Family: Salicaceae
- Genus: Salix
- Species: S. glabra

Binomial name
- Salix glabra Scop.

= Salix glabra =

Shrub in the genus of willows

Salix glabra, the smooth willow, is a small shrub from the willow genus (Salix). It is found in the mountainous areas of several European countries.

== Description ==
The smooth willow is a shrub that reaches heights of up to 1.5 meters. All parts of the plant are bare. The bare wood shows short, scattered welts. The bark of the thick branches and twigs is bare and red-brown.

The alternate leaves are arranged in a petiole and a leaf blade. The simple, bald leaf blade is 4 to 6 centimeters long and 1.5 to 2.5 centimeters wide and elliptical or ovate to elongated with a blunt to pointed end, a rounded to wedge-shaped base and a glandular serrate edge. The upper side of the leaf is dark green and very shiny, the underside is whitish and has a thick wax coating. The leaf veins stand out clearly. The stipules are poorly developed.

The smooth willow flowers from May to June just before the leaves shoot. The short inflorescence stem is covered with leaves. The kitten-shaped inflorescences are elliptical with a length of up to 7 centimeters. The bracts of male flowers are monochrome, female flowers are two-colored and bearded at the tip and have a broad nectar gland . Male flowers have two stamens hairy at the base with initially purple-red, later yellow-discolored anthers. The ovary of female flowers is stalked and glabrous. The extended stylus ends in a short and split scar.

The number of chromosomes is 2n = 76 or 114.

== Habitat and distribution ==
The natural distribution area is in Europe in Austria, Southern Germany, eastern Switzerland, Slovenia, Croatia, Bosnia, and in Northern Italy.

The smooth willow grows in the mountains in cool, moist forests on weakly acidic to alkaline, humus to sandy-loamy, nutrient-rich soils in sunny to light-shaded, cool and winter cold locations and is frost hardy. It likes to grow on dolomite. It is a character species of Salicetum glabrae from the association Salicion waldsteininanae. The distribution area is assigned to winter hardiness zone 4 with mean annual minimum temperatures of −34.4 to −28.9 °C (−30 to −20 °F).

== Clarification ==
The first publication of Salix glabra was made in 1772 by Giovanni Antonio Scopoli. The specific epithet glabra is Latin for "smooth" or "bald".
