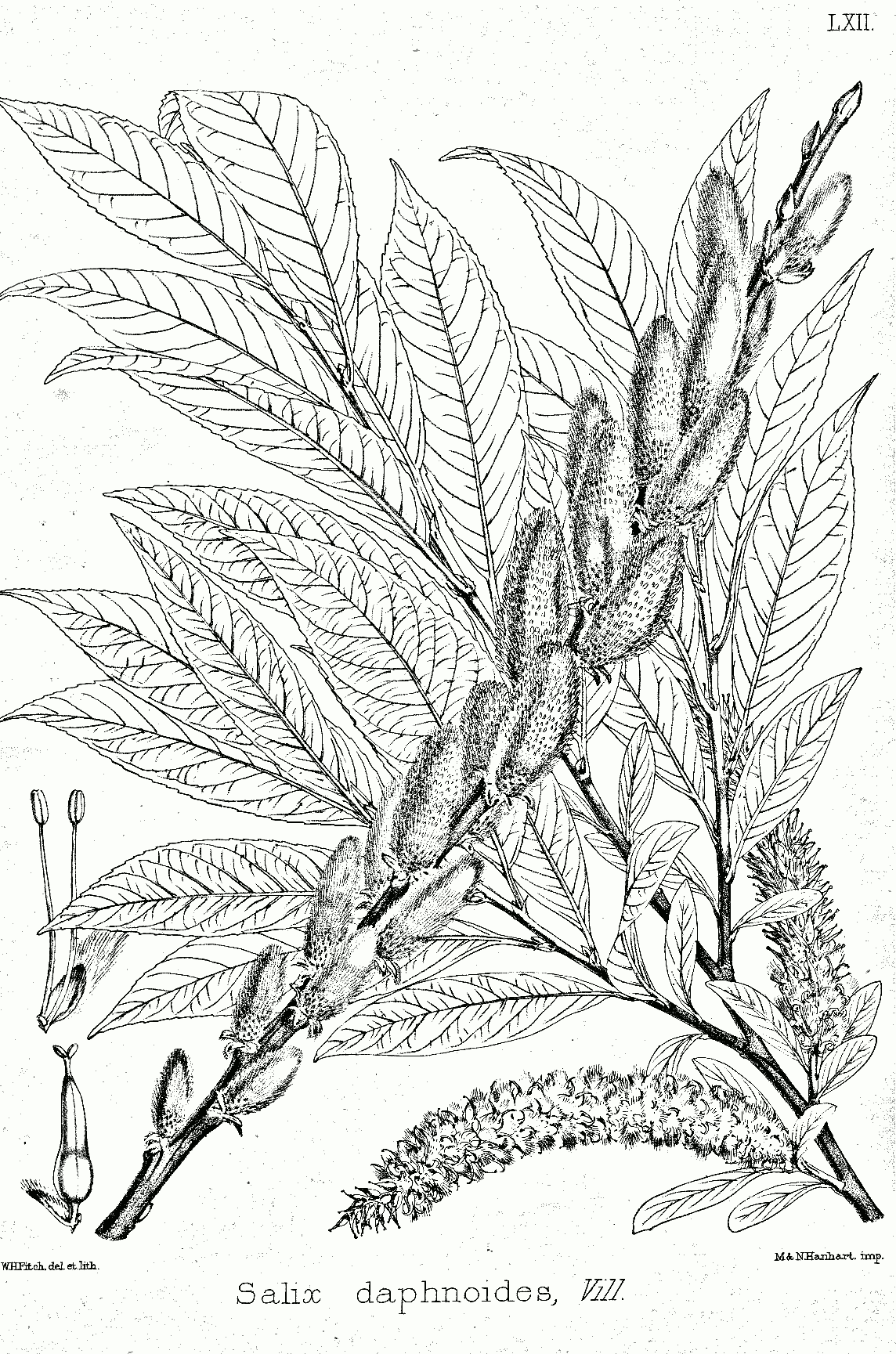

Conservation status
- Least Concern (IUCN 3.1)

Scientific classification
- Kingdom: Plantae
- Clade: Tracheophytes
- Clade: Angiosperms
- Clade: Eudicots
- Clade: Rosids
- Order: Malpighiales
- Family: Salicaceae
- Genus: Salix
- Species: S. daphnoides

Binomial name
- Salix daphnoides Vill.

= Salix daphnoides =

Species of flowering plant

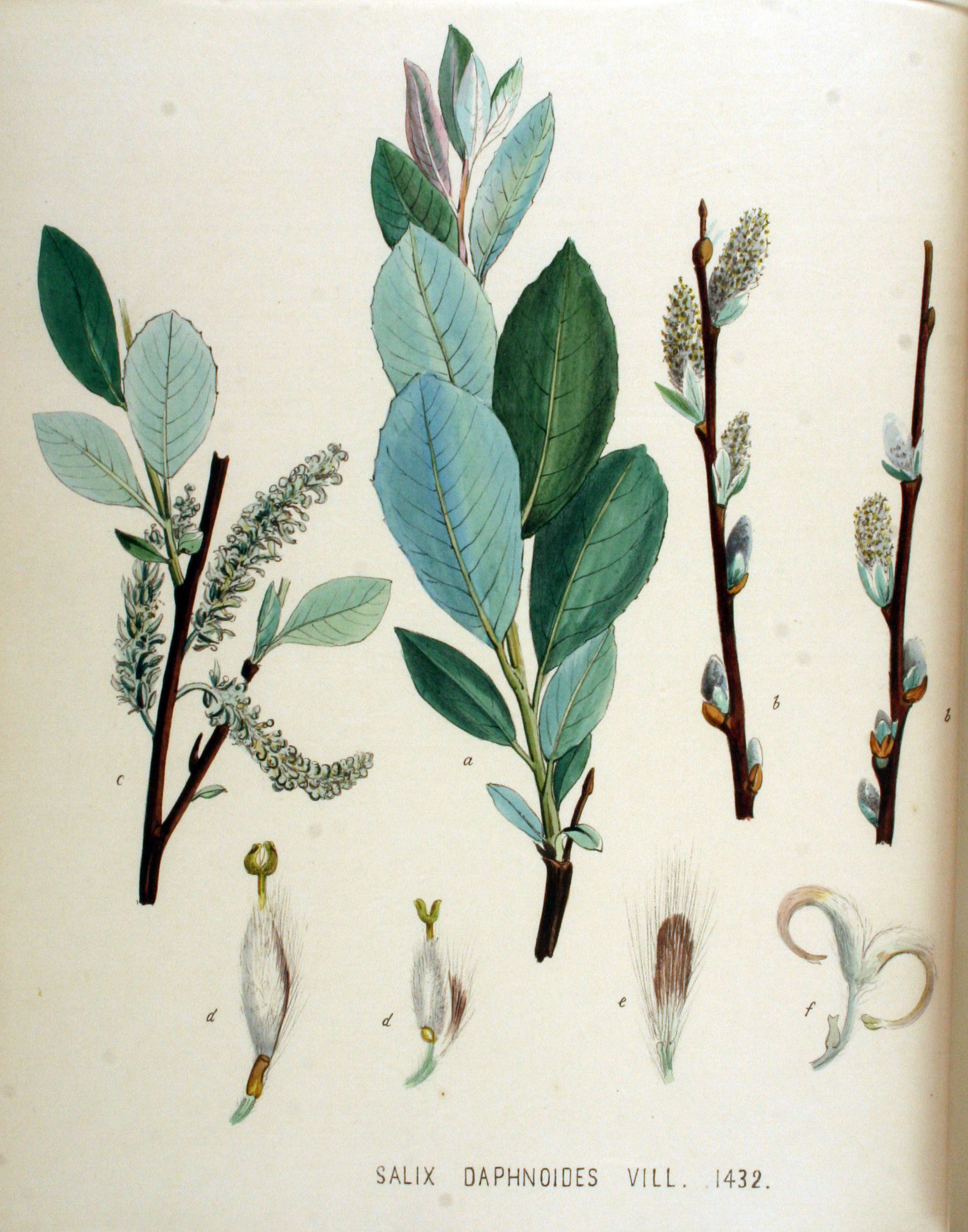
Salix daphnoides – Flora Batava, Volume 18

Salix daphnoides, the European violet willow, is a species of plant in the family Salicaceae. It can grow as a large shrub or small tree, normally reaching a height of 6–8 m (20–26 ft), but can grow up to 12 m (39 ft) tall.

== Description ==
It has a rounded crown with spreading branches with smooth, grey bark. The twigs are dark red/brown in colour, hairless and somewhat shiny. It has large buds, either hairless or with stiff, erect hairs. The leaves are oblong to narrow/obovate, normally between 7 and 12 cm long and 2 to 3 cm in width. They are hairy at first, but soon become glabrous, being a dark shiny green on their upper surfaces, and glaucous on their undersides. The catkins appear in February–March.

== Distribution and habitat ==
Salix daphnoides occurs scattered across central Europe between the Baltic states and Piedmont, and from the Balkans to eastern France. It is native in the Alps, Pyrenees and the Carpathians, but has been naturalised by cultivation across a much wider area. It occurs at altitudes of 100–2,000 metres (330–6,560 ft).

It grows along the banks of rivers and wetlands in alpine areas, preferring sand, pebbly or bolder-rich alluvial substrates. It also descends into lowland areas, occurring along main rivers such as the Visla and the Rhine (often with Salix eleagnos and Myricaria germanica) as well as in loose sand dunes.

== Conservation status ==
The species is regarded by the IUCN as having a conservation status of 'Least Concern' because of its broad distribution, especially within a number of ecologically protected areas. Nevertheless, it is listed on a number of 'red lists' of individual countries.

== Uses ==
It is planted to provide reinforcement to coastal and continental sand dunes, but is also widely planted as an ornamental species in parks and along roads.

The cultivar 'Aglaia' has won the Royal Horticultural Society's Award of Garden Merit.
