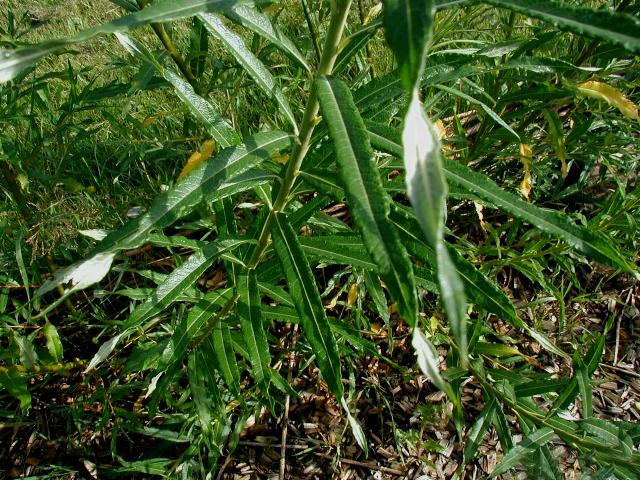
- Common osier foliage

Conservation status
- Least Concern (IUCN 3.1)

Scientific classification
- Kingdom: Plantae
- Clade: Embryophytes
- Clade: Tracheophytes
- Clade: Angiosperms
- Clade: Eudicots
- Clade: Rosids
- Order: Malpighiales
- Family: Salicaceae
- Genus: Salix
- Species: S. viminalis

Binomial name
- Salix viminalis L.

= Salix viminalis =

Species of willow

Salix viminalis, the basket willow, common osier or osier, is a species of willow native to Europe, Western Asia, and the Himalayas.

== Description ==
Salix viminalis is a multistemmed shrub growing to between 3 and 6 m (9.8 and 19.7 ft) (rarely to 10 m (33 ft)) tall. It has long, erect, straight branches with greenish-grey bark. The leaves long and slender, 10–25 cm long but only 0.5–2 cm broad; they are dark green above, with a silky grey-haired underside. The flowers are catkins, produced in early spring before the leaves; they are dioecious, with male and female catkins on separate plants. The male catkins are yellow and oval-shaped; the female catkins are longer and more cylindrical; they mature in early summer when the fruit capsules split open to release the numerous minute seeds.

== Distribution and habitat ==
It is commonly found by streams and other wet places. The exact native range is uncertain due to extensive historical cultivation; it is certainly native from central Europe east to western Asia, but may also be native as far west as southeastern England. As a cultivated or naturalised plant, it is widespread throughout both Britain and Ireland, but only at lower altitudes. It is one of the least variable willows, but it will hybridise with several other species.

== Cultivation and uses ==
Along with other related willows, the flexible twigs (called withies) are commonly used in basketry, giving rise to its alternative common name of "basket willow". In his History of the Peloponnesian War, the ancient historian Thucydides describes using osier in 425 BCE to construct makeshift shields. Cultivation and use of the common osier was common in England in the 18th and 19th century, with osier beds lining many rivers and streams.

Other uses occur in energy forestry, effluent treatment, wastewater gardens, and cadmium phytoremediation for water purification.

Salix viminalis is a known hyperaccumulator of cadmium, chromium, lead, mercury, petroleum hydrocarbons, organic solvents, MTBE, TCE and byproducts, selenium, silver, uranium, and zinc, and as such is a prime candidate for phytoremediation. For more information, see the list of hyperaccumulators.

== Ecology ==
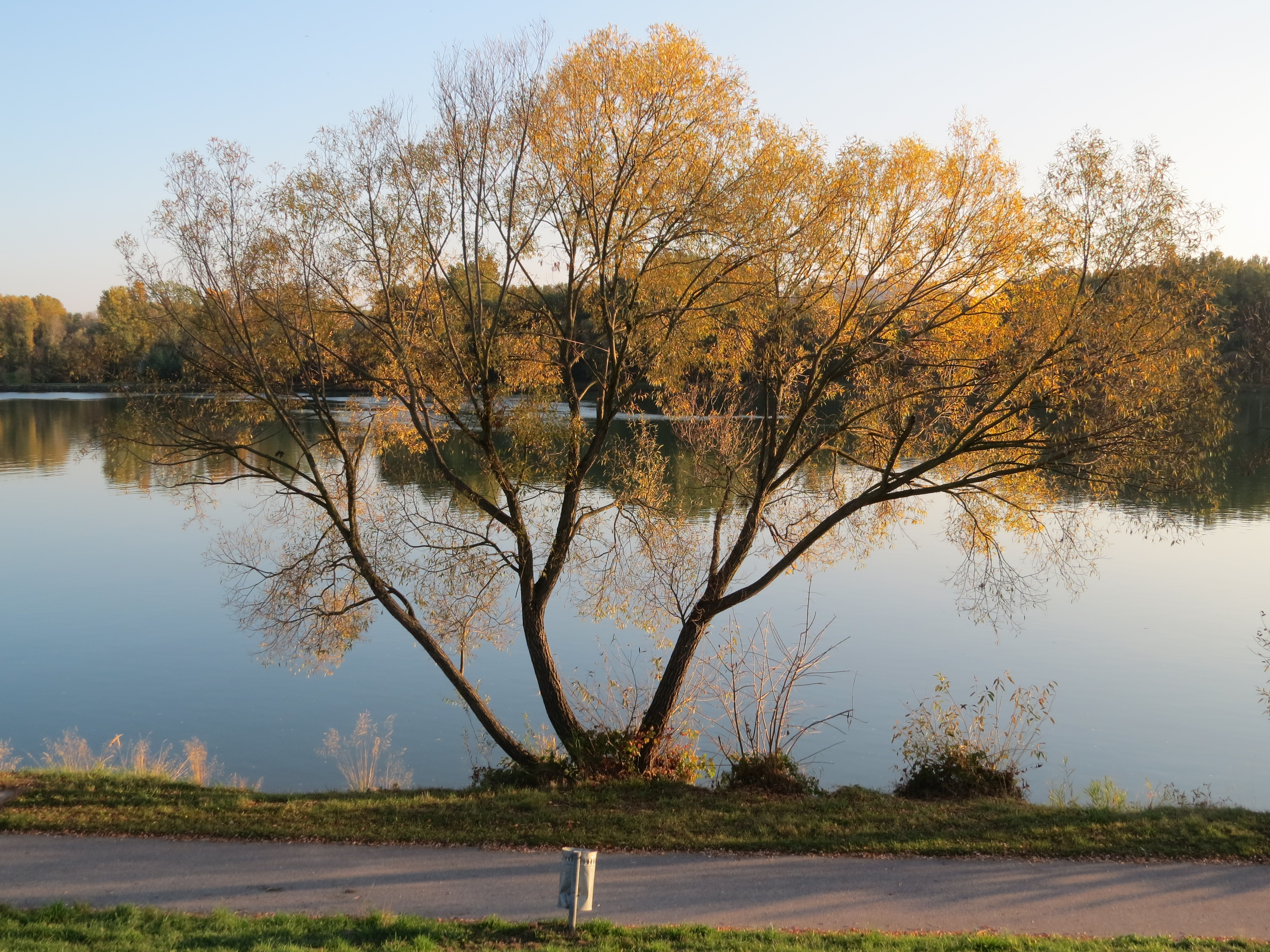
Salix viminalis (basket willow) at Krems an der Donau, Austria

Among the most common pathogens on S. viminalis are Melampsora spp. Female plants are more severely infected than male plants.
