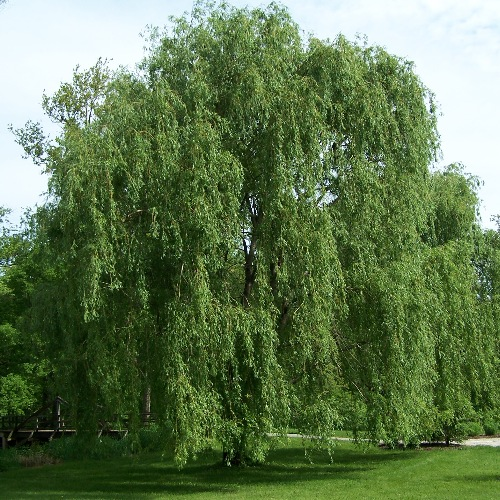
- Salix alba 'Vitellina-Tristis'; Morton Arboretum, Lisle, Illinois

Scientific classification
- Kingdom: Plantae
- Clade: Tracheophytes
- Clade: Angiosperms
- Clade: Eudicots
- Clade: Rosids
- Order: Malpighiales
- Family: Salicaceae
- Subfamily: Salicoideae
- Tribe: Saliceae
- Genus: Salix; L., nom. cons.

Type species
- Salix alba L.

Diversity
- About 350 species

= Willow =

Willow Temporal range: Eocene–Recent

Genus of trees

Willows, also called sallows and osiers, of the genus Salix, comprise around 350 species (plus numerous hybrids) of typically deciduous trees and shrubs. They are primarily found on moist soils in cold and temperate regions.

Most species are known as willow, but some narrow-leaved shrub species are called osier, and some broader-leaved species are referred to as sallow (from Old English sealh, related to the Latin word salix, willow).

Some willows (particularly arctic and alpine species) are low-growing or creeping shrubs; for example, the dwarf willow (Salix herbacea) rarely exceeds 6 centimetres (2 1/2 in) in height, though it spreads widely across the ground.

== Description ==
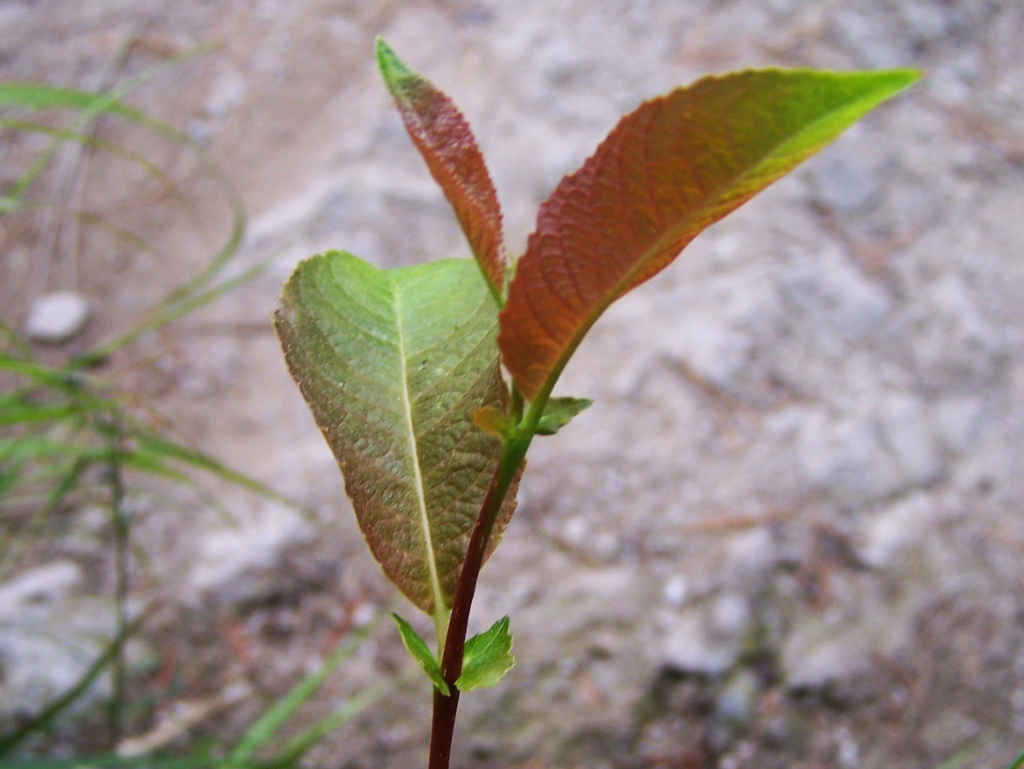
At the base of the petiole, a pair of stipules form. These may fall in spring, or last for much of the summer or even for more than one year (marcescence).

Willows have watery bark sap rich in salicin, soft, usually pliant, tough wood, slender branches, and large, fibrous roots that are often stoloniferous. The roots are remarkable for their toughness, size, and tenacity to live, and roots readily sprout from aerial parts of the plant.

=== Leaves ===
The leaves are typically elongated, but they might also be round to oval, frequently with serrated edges. Most species are deciduous; semi-evergreen willows with coriaceous leaves are rare, e.g. Salix micans and S. australior in the eastern Mediterranean.

All the buds are lateral; no absolutely terminal bud is ever formed. The buds are covered by a single scale. Usually, the bud scale is fused into a cap-like shape, but in some species it wraps around and the edges overlap.

The leaves are simple, feather-veined, and typically linear-lanceolate. Usually they are serrate, rounded at base, acute or acuminate. The leaf petioles are short, the stipules often very conspicuous, resembling tiny, round leaves, and sometimes remaining for half the summer. On some species, however, they are small, inconspicuous, and caducous (soon falling).

In color, the leaves show a great variety of greens, ranging from yellowish to bluish color.

Willows are among the earliest woody plants to leaf out in spring and among the last to drop their leaves in autumn. In the northern hemisphere, leafout may occur as early as February depending on the climate and is stimulated by air temperature. If daytime highs reach 10 °C (50 °F) for a few consecutive days, a willow will attempt to put out leaves and flowers.

In the northern hemisphere, leaf drop in autumn occurs when day length shortens to approximately ten hours and 25 minutes, which varies by latitude (as early as the first week of October for boreal species such as S. alaxensis and as late as the third week of December for willows growing in far southern areas).

=== Flowers ===
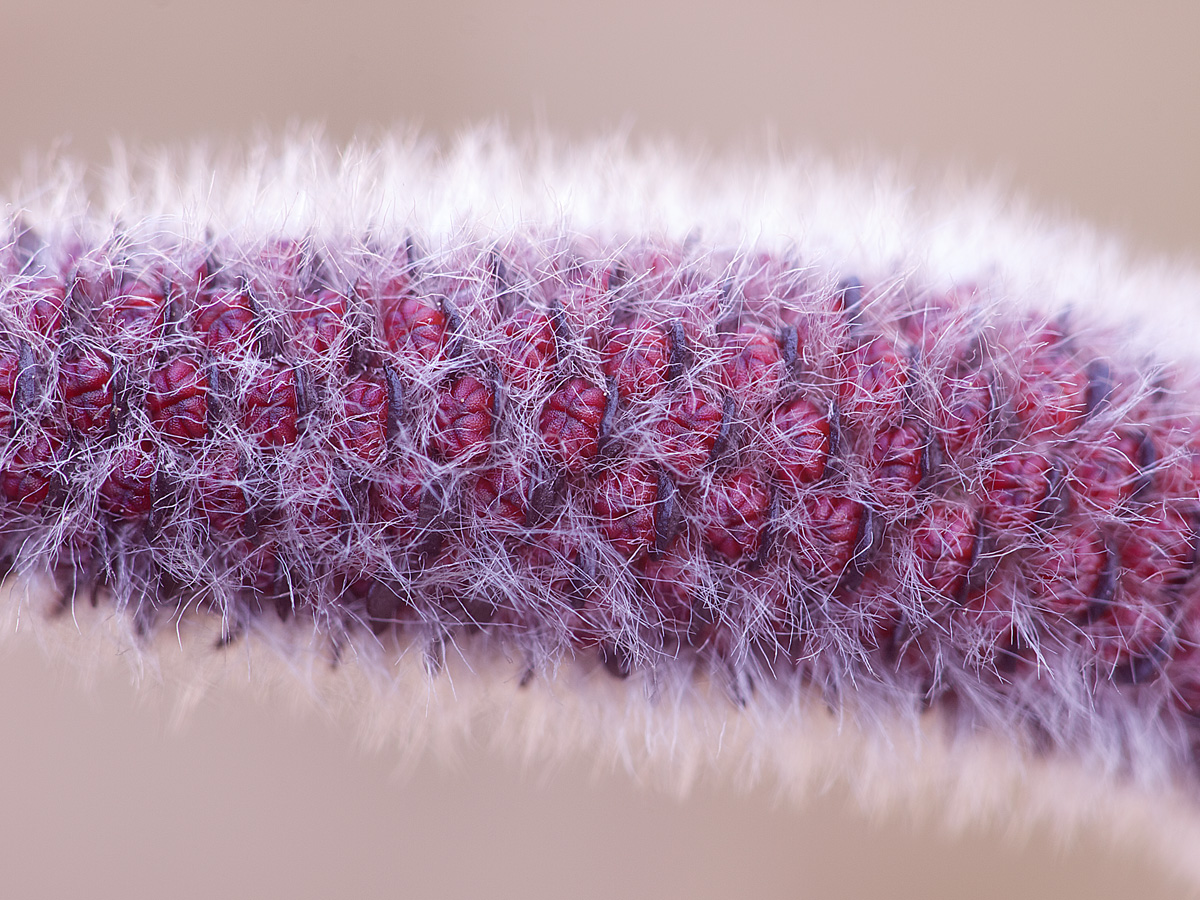
Young male catkin

With the exception of Salix martiana, willows are dioecious, with male and female flowers appearing as catkins on separate plants; the catkins are produced early in the spring, often before the leaves.

The staminate (male) flowers have neither calyx nor corolla; they consist simply of stamens, varying in number from two to 10, accompanied by a nectariferous gland and inserted on the base of a scale which is itself borne on the rachis of a drooping raceme called a catkin, or ament. This scale is square, entire, and very hairy. The anthers are rose-colored in the bud, but orange or purple after the flower opens; they are two-celled and the cells open latitudinally. The filaments are threadlike, usually pale brown, and often bald.

The pistillate (female) flowers are also without calyx or corolla, and consist of a single ovary accompanied by a small, flat nectar gland and inserted on the base of a scale which is likewise borne on the rachis of a catkin. The ovary is one-celled, the style two-lobed, and the ovules numerous.

== Taxonomy ==
The scientific use of the genus name Salix originates with Carl Linnaeus in 1753. The modern concept of types did not exist at the time, so types for Linnaeus's genera had to be designated later. The type species, i.e., the species on which the genus name is based, is Salix alba, based on a conserved type.

The generic name Salix comes from Latin and was already used by the Romans for various types of willow. A theory is that the word is ultimately derived from a Celtic language, sal meaning 'near' and lis meaning 'water', alluding to their habitat.

Willows are classified into subgenera though what they should be is in flux. Morphological studies generally divide the species into 3 or 5 subgenera: Salix (though some split off subgenera Longifoliae and Protitae), Chamaetia, and Vetrix. Phylogenetic studies have suggested that Chamaetia and Vetrix be in one clade.

The oldest fossils of the genus are known from the early Eocene of North America, with the earliest occurrences in Europe during the Early Oligocene.

=== Selected species ===
The genus Salix is made up of around 350 species of deciduous trees and shrubs. They hybridise freely, and over 160 such hybrids have been named. Examples of well-known willows include:

- Salix aegyptiaca L. – musk willow
- Salix alba L. – white willow
- Salix amygdaloides Andersson – peachleaf willow
- Salix arctica Pall. – Arctic willow
- Salix babylonica L. – Babylon willow, Peking willow or weeping willow
- Salix bebbiana Sarg. – beaked willow, long-beaked willow, or Bebb's willow
- Salix caprea L. – goat willow or pussy willow
- Salix cinerea L. – grey willow
- Salix discolor Muhl. – American pussy willow or glaucous willow
- Salix eleagnos – rosemary willow
- Salix euxina I.V.Belyaeva – eastern crack willow
- Salix exigua Nutt. – sandbar willow, narrowleaf willow, or coyote willow
- Salix × fragilis L. – common crack willow
- Salix glauca L. – gray willow, grayleaf willow, white willow, or glaucous willow
- Salix gooddingii C.R.Ball – Goodding's black willow
- Salix herbacea L. – dwarf willow, least willow or snowbed willow
- Salix humboldtiana Willd. – Humbolt's willow, native to central and South America
- Salix integra Thunb.
- Salix laevigata Bebb – red willow or polished willow
- Salix lasiolepis Benth. – arroyo willow
- Salix mucronata Andersson – Safsaf willow, a species from southern Africa
- Salix nigra Marshall – black willow
- Salix paradoxa Kunth
- Salix pierotii Miq. – Korean willow
- Salix purpurea L. – purple willow or purple osier
- Salix scouleriana Barratt ex Hook. – Scouler's willow
- Salix sepulcralis group – hybrid willows
- Salix tetrasperma Roxb. – Indian willow
- Salix triandra L. – almond willow or almond-leaved willow
- Salix viminalis L. – common osier

== Ecology ==
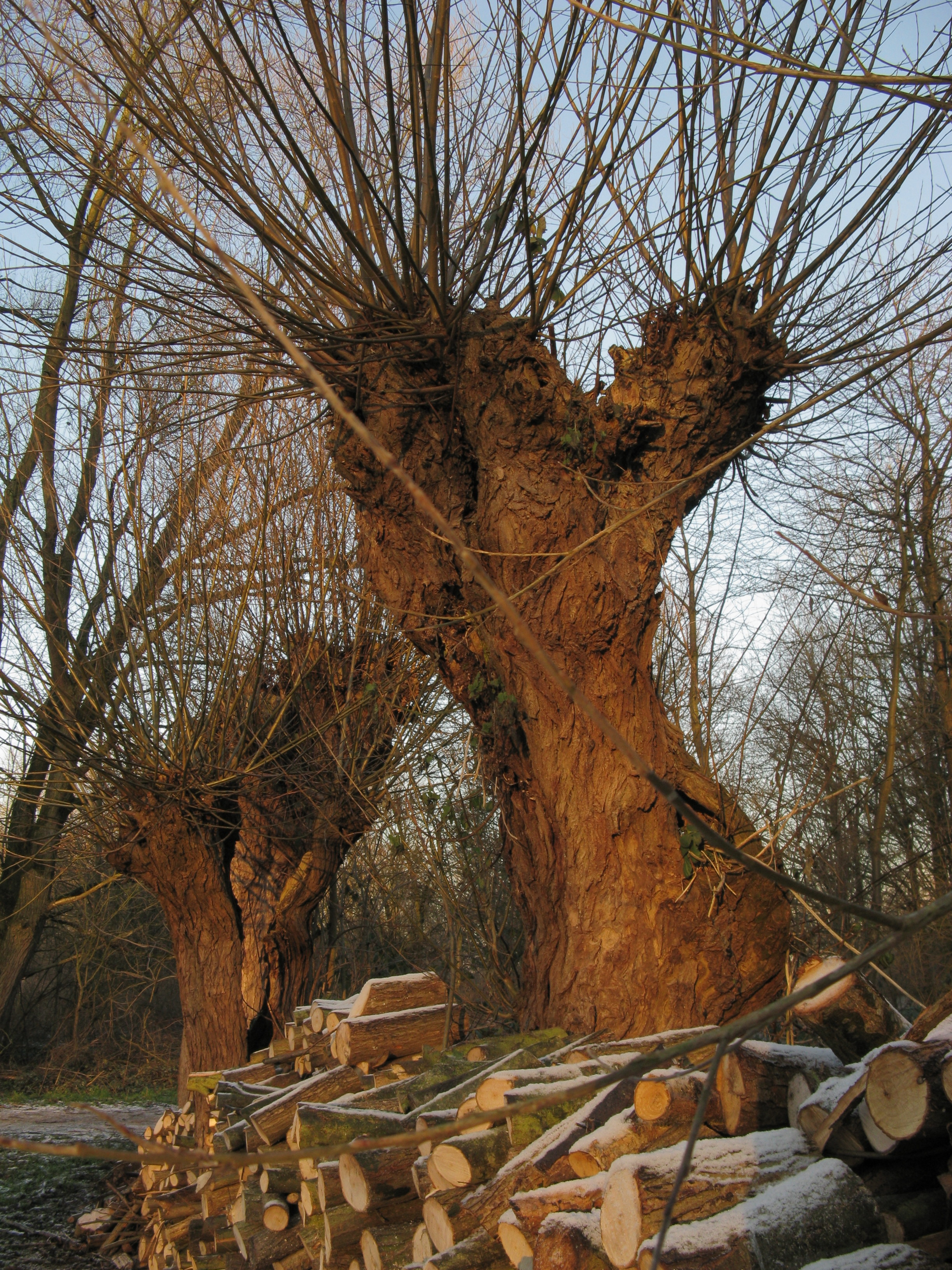
Pollard willow and woodpile in the Bourgoyen-Ossemeersen, Ghent, Belgium

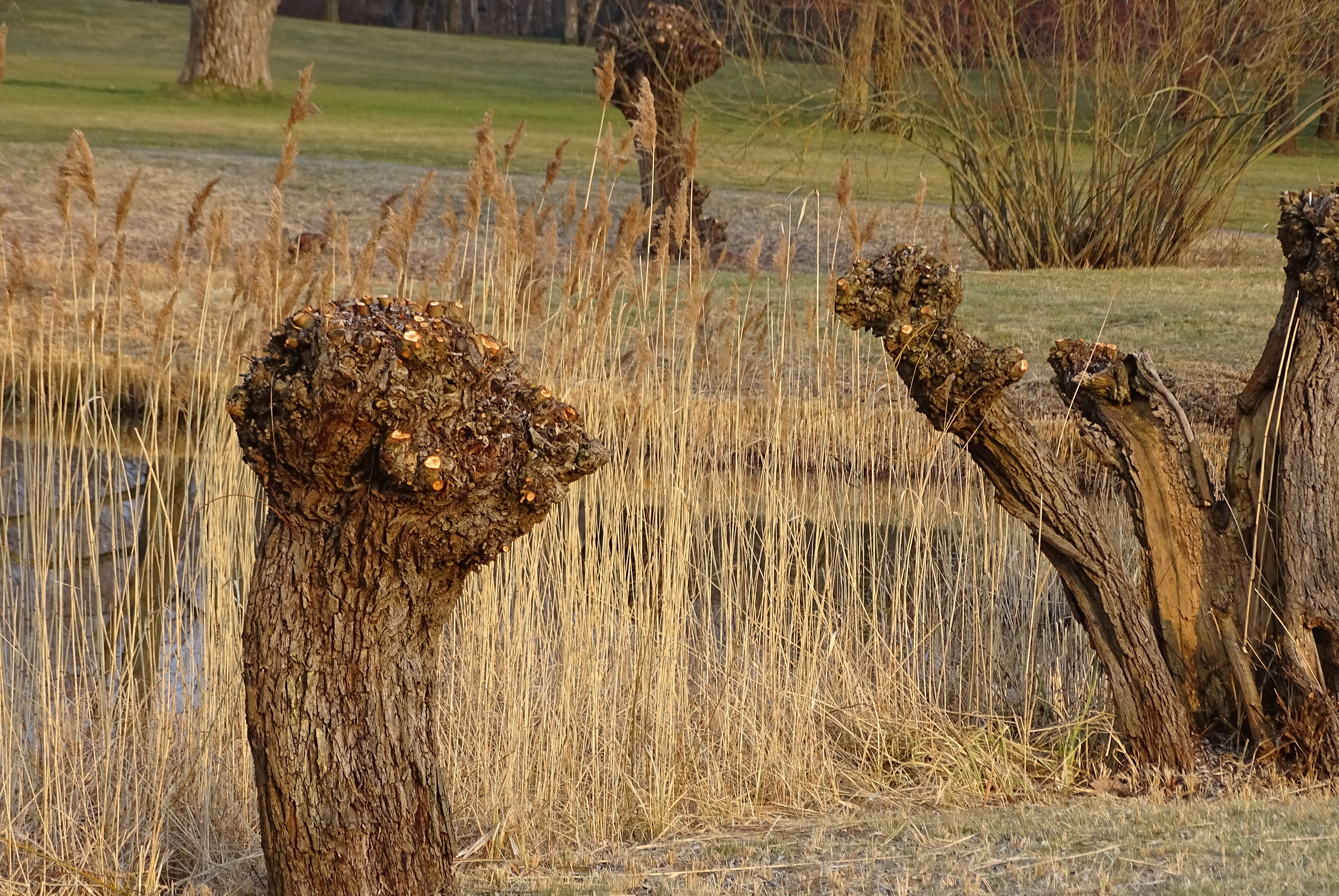
Berlin Britzer Garten pollarded willow tree in the spring of March 2018

Willows are shade tolerant and typically short-lived. They require disturbances to outcompete conifers or large deciduous species. The seeds are tiny, plentiful, carried by wind and water, and viable only for a few days; they require warm and moist conditions to take root. The plants can also reproduce vegetatively from decapitated stumps and branches.

Willows produce a modest amount of nectar from which bees can make honey, and are especially valued as a source of early pollen for bees. Various animals browse the foliage or shelter amongst the plants. Beavers use willows to build dams. The trees are used as food by the larvae of some species of Lepidoptera, such as the mourning cloak butterfly. Ants, such as wood ants, are common on willows inhabited by aphids, coming to collect aphid honeydew, as sometimes do wasps.

=== Pests and diseases ===
Willow species are hosts to more than a hundred aphid species, belonging to Chaitophorus and other genera, forming large colonies to feed on plant juices, on the underside of leaves in particular. Corythucha elegans, the willow lace bug, is a bug species in the family Tingidae found on willows in North America. Rhabdophaga rosaria is a type of gall found on willows.

Rust, caused by fungi of genus Melampsora, is known to damage leaves of willows, covering them with orange spots.

=== Conservation ===
Some Native Americans allowed wildfires to burn and set fires intentionally, allowing new stands to form.

A small number of willow species were widely planted in Australia, notably as erosion-control measures along watercourses. They are now regarded as invasive weeds which occupy extensive areas across southern Australia and are considered 'Weeds of National Significance'. Many catchment management authorities are removing and replacing them with native trees.

=== Sex ratio ===
Willows (Salix) are one of the plant genera in which sex ratios have been frequently investigated, and almost all studies report evidences of a female-biased secondary sex ratio in natural populations. In several of these studies, sex ratios were associated with different environmental conditions such as draught, altitude or other ecological mechanisms.. For other Salix species there are no evidences of ecological difference between the two sexes, suggesting that the sex bias could also be present from the seed stage.

== Cultivation ==
Almost all willows take root very readily from cuttings or where broken branches lie on the ground (an exception is the peachleaf willow, Salix amygdaloides). One famous example of such growth from cuttings involves the poet Alexander Pope, who begged a twig from a parcel tied with twigs sent from Spain to Lady Suffolk. This twig was planted and thrived, and legend has it that all of England's weeping willows are descended from this first one.

Willows are extensively cultivated around the world. They are used in hedges and landscaping.

The high end shopping district of Ginza in Tokyo, Japan, has a long history of cultivating willow, and is well known for its willow lined streets.

=== Hybrids and cultivars ===
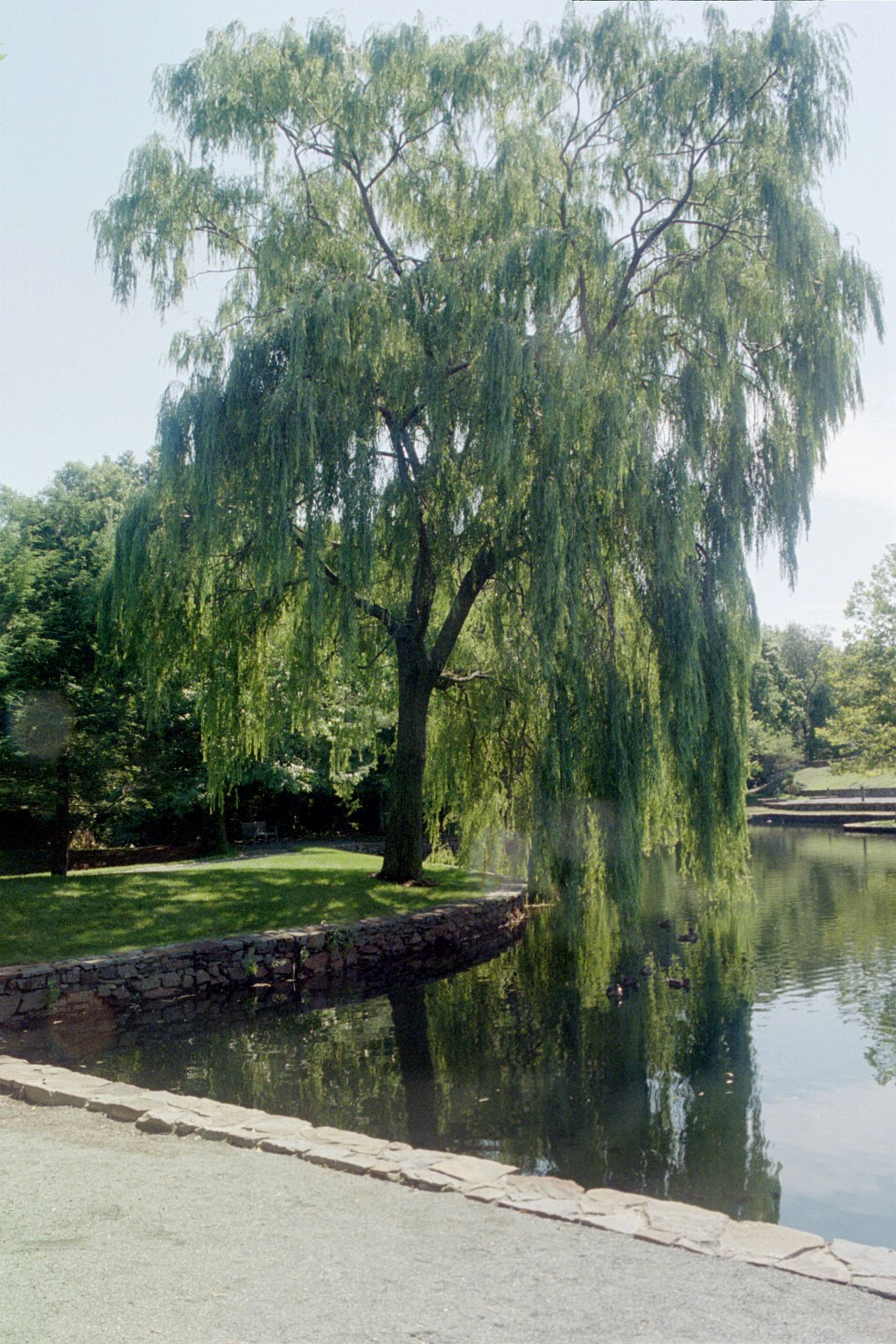
Weeping willow, an example of a hybrid between two types of willow

Willows are very cross-compatible, and numerous hybrids occur, both naturally and in cultivation. A well-known ornamental example is the weeping willow (Salix × sepulcralis), which is a hybrid of Peking willow (Salix babylonica) from China and white willow (Salix alba) from Europe. The widely planted Chinese willow Salix matsudana is now considered a synonym of S. babylonica.

Numerous cultivars of Salix have been developed and named over the centuries. New selections of cultivars with superior technical and ornamental characteristics have been chosen deliberately and applied to various purposes. Many cultivars and unmodified species of Salix have gained the Royal Horticultural Society's Award of Garden Merit. Most recently, Salix has become an important source for bioenergy production and for various ecosystem services.

Names of hybrids and cultivars were until recently (2021) compiled by a working party of the UN FAO, the International Cultivar Registration Authority (ICRAs) for the genus Salix (willows), but it is no longer active.

== Uses ==
The Quinault people of Washington made the bark into a twine which sometimes served as harpoon line. The wood was used by some other Native American tribes to start fires by friction, the shoots to weave baskets, and both the branches and stems to build various items including fishing weirs.

=== History of use in folk medicine ===
The leaves and bark of the willow have been mentioned in ancient texts from Assyria, Sumer and Egypt and in Ancient Greece the physician Hippocrates wrote about its properties as a folk medicine in the fifth century BC.

Interpreting Mesopotamian cuneiform texts is a challenge, especially when looking for something as specific as a species of plant being used to treat a recognisable condition. Some 5,000 medical prescriptions have been identified from Babylonian writings of the 7th to 3rd centuries BC, involving 1,300 drugs from 340 different plants. Whether any of these relate to willow is uncertain. The seeds of the Haluppu-tree were recommended in the Sumerian narrative of Gilgameš, Enkidu and the Nether World as treatment for infertility, but the "Haluppu-tree" could have been oak, poplar or willow.

The ancient Egyptian Ebers Papyrus mentions willow (of uncertain species) in three remedies. One, as part of an elaborate recipe for a poultice to "make the met supple," which involved 36 other ingredients including "fruit of the dompalm, beans and amaa grains." The meaning of met is uncertain, but it may be something to do with the nervous system. The second is as part of a treatment for the "Great Debility," when "rush from the green willow tree" is combined with ass's semen, fresh bread, herbs of the field, figs, grapes and wine. Finally, it is used as a stiffening agent in a concoction of "fat flesh, figs, dates, incense, garlic and sweet beer" to put the heart into proper working order and make it take up nourishment.

The Roman author Aulus Cornelius Celsus only mentions willow once: the leaves, pounded and boiled in vinegar, were to be used as treatment for uterine prolapse, but it is unclear what he considered the therapeutic action to be; it is unlikely to have been pain relief, as he recommended cauterization in the following paragraph.

Nicholas Culpeper, in The Complete Herbal, gives many uses for willow, including to staunch wounds, to "stay the heat of lust" in man or woman, and to provoke urine ("if stopped"), but he makes no mention of any supposed analgesic properties. His recommendation to use the burnt ashes of willow bark, mixed with vinegar, to "take away warts, corns, and superfluous flesh," seems to correspond with modern uses of salicylic acid. William Turner's account, written about 1597, focuses on the ability of the leaves and bark to "stay the spitting of blood, and all other fluxes of blood", if boiled in wine and drunk, but adds a treatment for fever, saying: "the green boughs with the leaves may very well be brought into chambers and set about the beds of those that be sick of fevers, for they do mightily cool the heat of the air, which thing is a wonderful refreshing to the sick patients."

In 1763, Reverend Edward Stone, of Chipping Norton, Oxfordshire, England, sent a letter to the Royal Society describing his experiments with powdered bark of white willow (Salix alba). He had noticed the willow bark tasted bitter, like 'Peruvian Bark' (cinchona), which was used to treat fevers, and he speculated that the willow would have a similar effect. Over several years he tested it on as many as fifty patients and found it to be highly effective (especially when mixed with cinchona). Whether this was a real effect or not is unknown, but although Stone's remedy was experimented with by others at the time, it was never adopted by medical practitioners. During the American Civil War, Confederate forces also experimented with willow as a cure for malaria, without success.

In his novel The Mysterious Island (1875), the French novelist Jules Verne outlined the state of scientific knowledge concerning medicinal uses of willow when one of his characters, Herbert (Harbert) Brown, was suffering from a fever induced by a bullet wound: "The bark of the willow has, indeed, been justly considered as a succedaneum for Peruvian bark, as has also that of the horse-chestnut tree, the leaf of the holly, the snake-root, etc.", he wrote. In the story, Herbert is treated with powdered willow bark to no effect, and is saved when a supply of quinine is discovered. It is clear in the novel that the causes of fevers were poorly understood, and there is no suggestion at all of any possible analgesic effect from the use of willow.

The first lasting evidence that salicylate, from willow and other plant species, might have real medicinal uses came in 1876, when the Scottish physician Thomas John MacLagan experimented with salicin as a treatment for acute rheumatism, with considerable success, as he reported in The Lancet. Meanwhile, German scientists tried salicylic acid in the form of sodium salicylate, a sodium salt, with less success and more severe side effects. The treatment of rheumatic fever with salicin gradually gained some acceptance in medical circles.

The discovery of acetanilide, in the 1880s, gave rise to an 'acetylation' craze, where chemists experimented with adding an acetyl group to various aromatic organic compounds. Back in 1853, chemist Charles Frédéric Gerhardt treated the medicine sodium salicylate with acetyl chloride to produce acetylsalicylic acid for the first time. More than 40 years later in 1897, Felix Hoffmann created the same acid (in his case derived from the Spiraea plant), which was found in 1899 to have an analgesic effect. This acid was named "Aspirin" by Hoffmann's employer Bayer AG. The discovery of aspirin is therefore only indirectly connected to willow.

In the late 1990s, Daniel Moerman reported many uses of willow by Native Americans. One modern field guide claims that Native Americans across the Americas relied on the willow as a staple of their medical treatments, using the bark to treat ailments such as sore throat and tuberculosis, and further alleging that "Several references mention chewing willow bark as an analgesic for headache and other pain, apparently presaging the development of aspirin in the late 1800s."

=== Modern medicinal uses ===
Herbal uses of willow have continued into modern times. In the early 20th century, Maud Grieve described using the bark and the powdered root of white willow (Salix alba) for its tonic, antiperiodic and astringent qualities and recommended its use in treating dyspepsia, worms, chronic diarrhoea and dysentery. Like other herbalists, she makes no mention of it having any analgesic effect, despite widespread awareness of aspirin by this time, and she considered tannin to be the active constituent.

It was long after the invention of aspirin that the idea emerged that willow bark is an effective painkiller. It may often be based on the belief that willow actually contains aspirin. Articles asserting that the ancients used willow for this purpose have been published in academic journals such as the British Journal of Haematology. There are now many papers, books and articles repeating the claim that the ancients used willow for pain relief, and numerous willow-based products can be purchased for this purpose. Willow bark contains low levels of salicin and works differently than aspirin, offering milder but broader anti-inflammatory effects without damaging the stomach, though it is unsuitable for those with aspirin allergies.

The Committee on Herbal Medicinal Products in the European Union has concluded that dry extracts of willow bark can be used as a medicine for the short-term treatment of lower back pain, based on clinical evidence demonstrating its safety and efficacy.

=== Dermatological uses ===
While the ingestible use of willow extracts has had limited therapeutic use in modern medicine, the topical use on skin has become more prevalent. There are numerous reports of improvements in skin vascularity, dermal photo-aging, and wound-healing from topical Salix herbal remedies. The direct application of phenolic compounds from willow to the skin microbiome and skin enzymes results in greater therapeutic bioavailability. Willow extract has been used in contact with Malassezia fungus on scalp, providing meaningful anti-dandruff and anti-inflammatory treatment.

=== Manufacturing ===
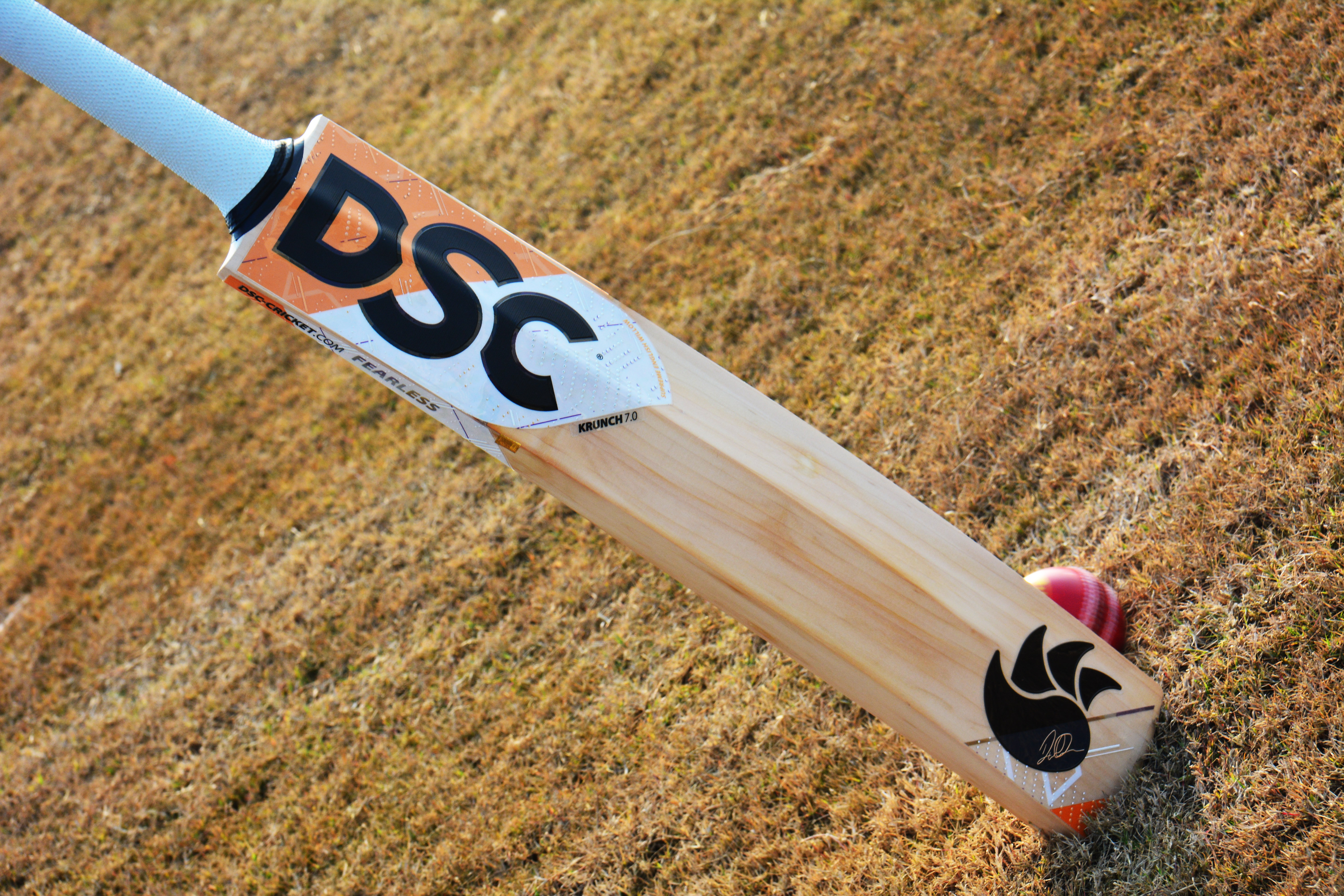
Cricket bats are traditionally made from willow wood.

Some of humans' earliest manufactured items may have been made from willow. A fishing net made from willow dates back to 8300 BC.

Basic crafts, such as baskets, fish traps, wattle fences and wattle and daub house walls, were woven from osiers or withies (rod-like willow shoots, often grown in pollards). One of the forms of Welsh coracle boat traditionally uses willow in the framework.

Thin or split willow rods can be woven into wicker, which has a long history. The relatively pliable willow is less likely to split while being woven than many other woods, and can be bent around sharp corners in basketry.

Willow wood is used in the manufacture of boxes, brooms, cricket bats, cradle boards, chairmans and other furniture, dolls, willow flutes, poles, sweat lodges, toys, turnery, tool handles, wood veneer, wands and whistles. In addition, tannin, fibre, paper, rope and string can be produced from the wood.

Willow is used in the manufacture of double basses for backs, sides and linings, and in making splines and blocks for bass repair.

=== Horticulture ===
An aqueous extract of willow bark is used as a fungicide in the European Union. The willow bark extract is approved as a 'basic substance' product in the European Union and United Kingdom for the control of scab, leaf peach curl and powdery mildew on grapes, apples and peach crops.

=== Weeds ===
Willow roots spread widely and are very aggressive in seeking out moisture; for this reason, they can become problematic when planted in residential areas, where the roots are notorious for clogging French drains, drainage systems, weeping tiles, septic systems, storm drains, and sewer systems, particularly older, tile, concrete, or ceramic pipes. Newer, PVC sewer pipes are much less leaky at the joints, and are therefore less susceptible to problems from willow roots; the same is true of water supply piping.

=== Others ===
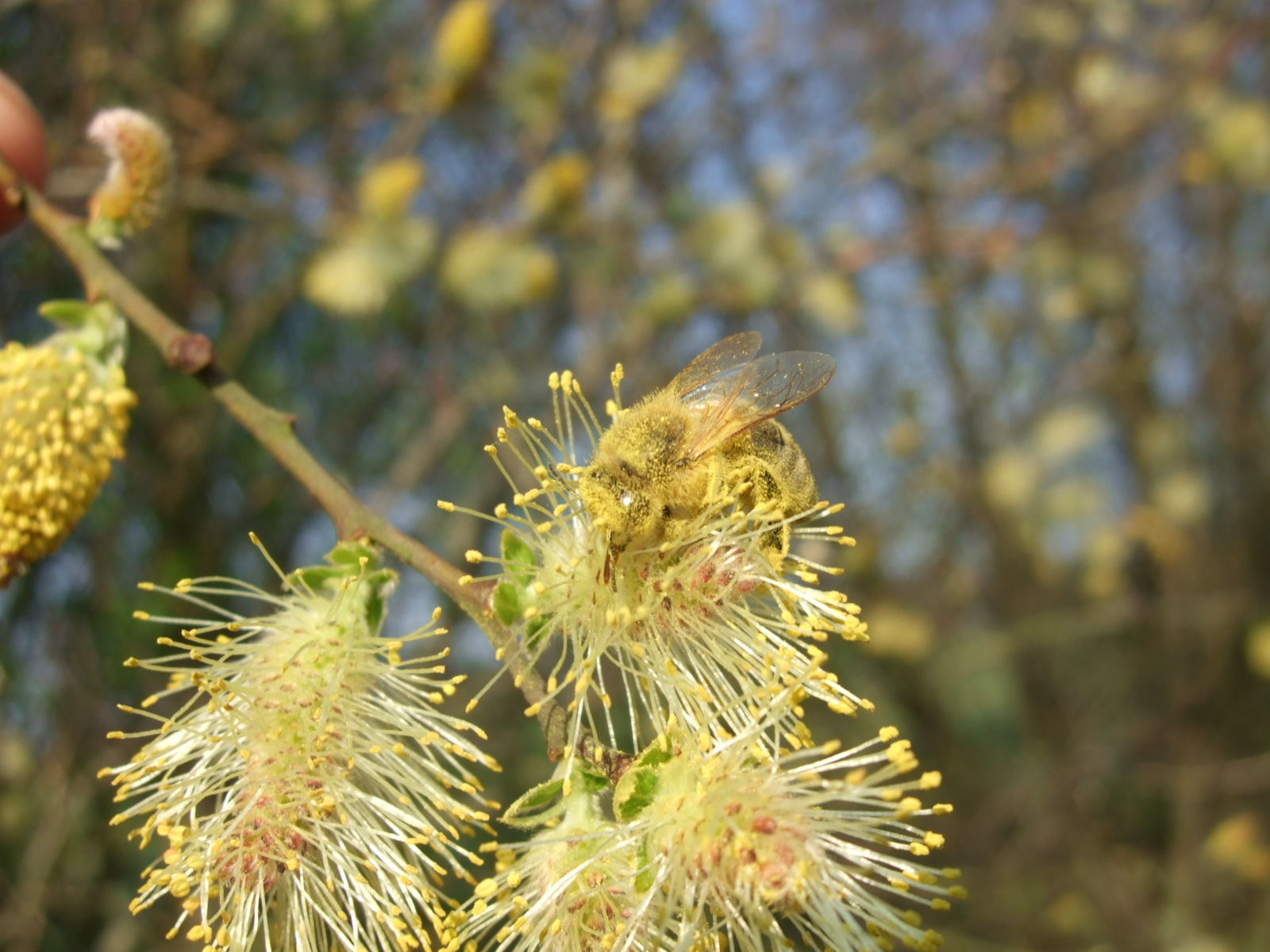
Male catkin of Salix cinerea with bee

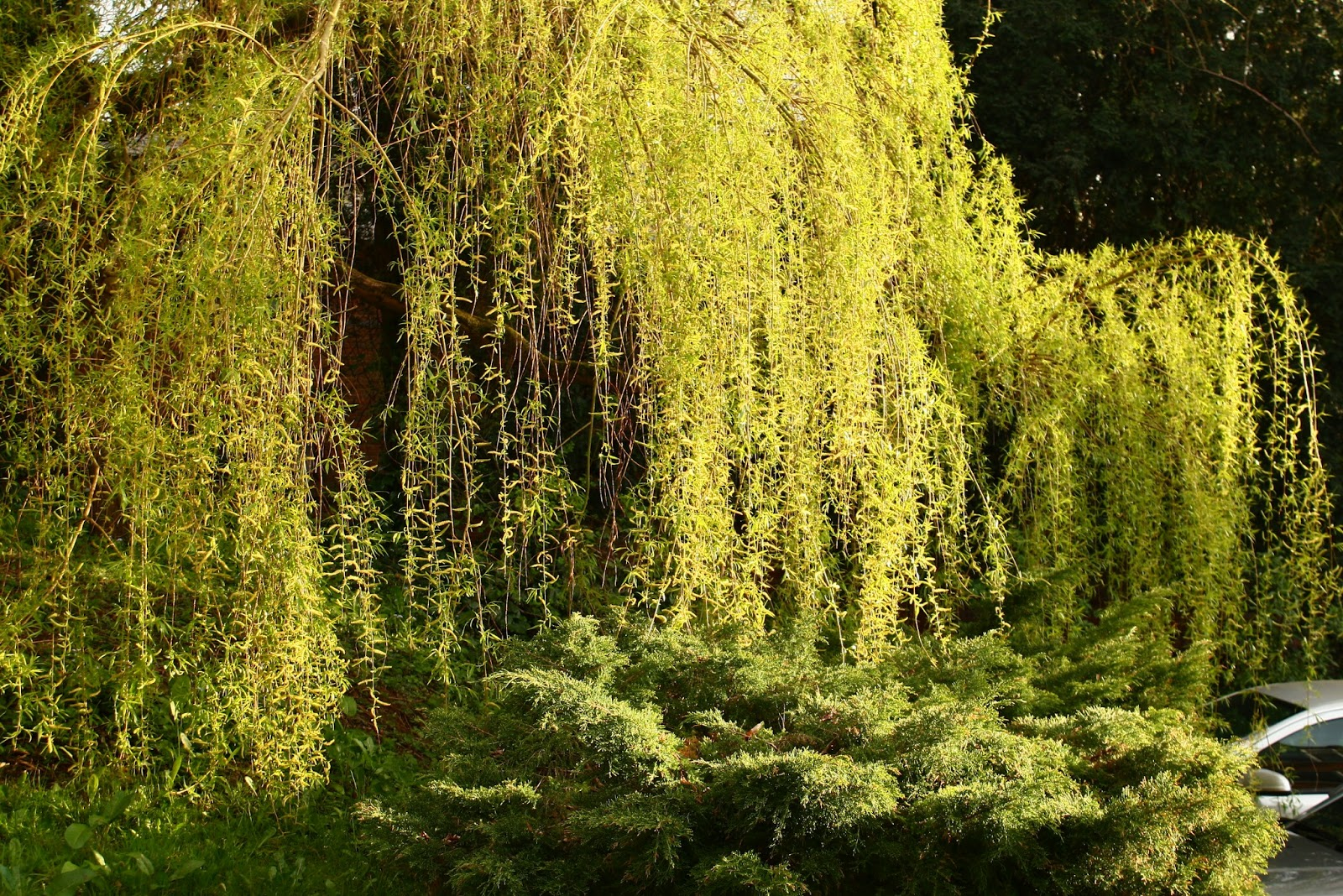
Willow tree in spring, England

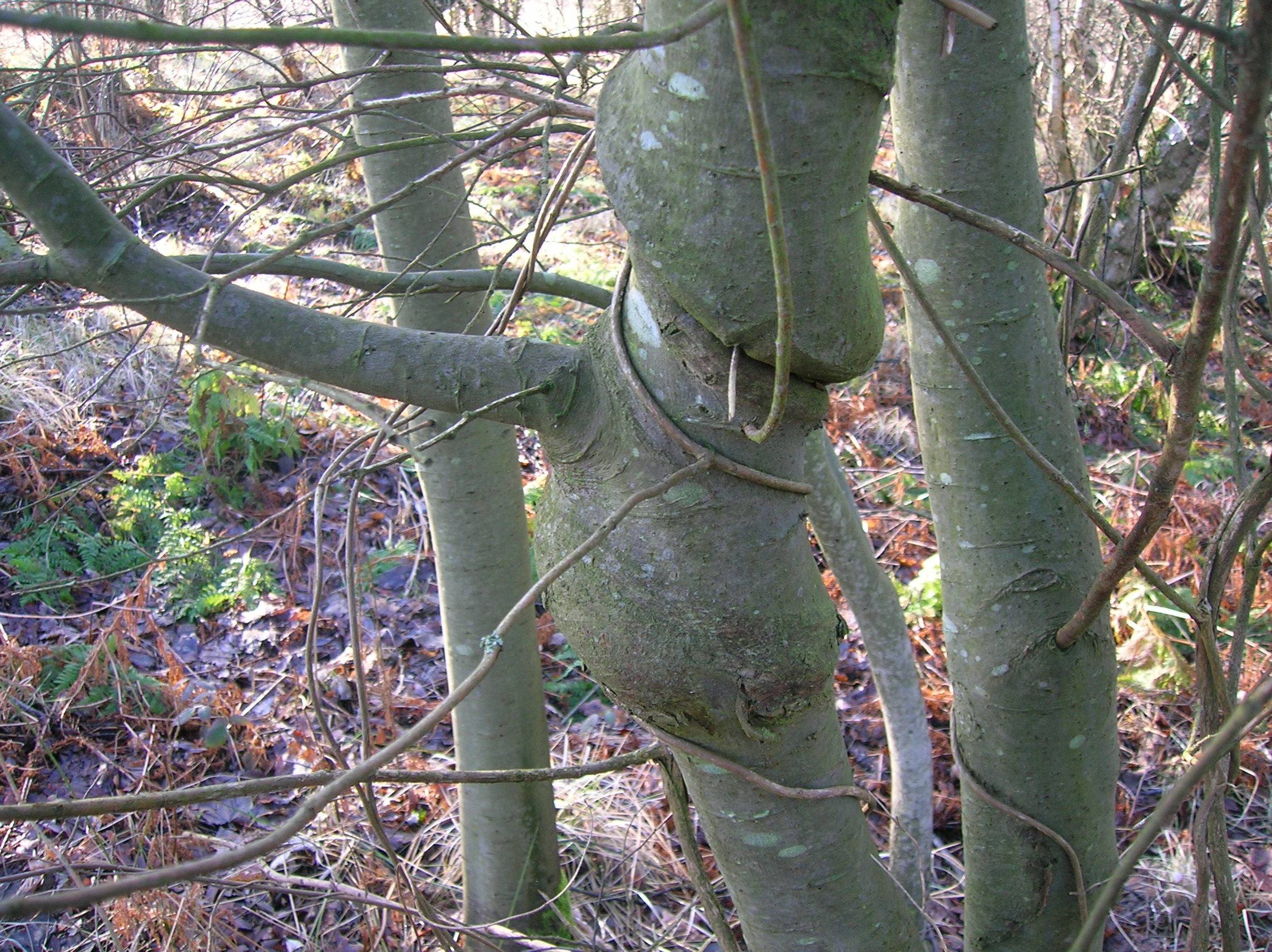
Willow tree with woodbine honeysuckle

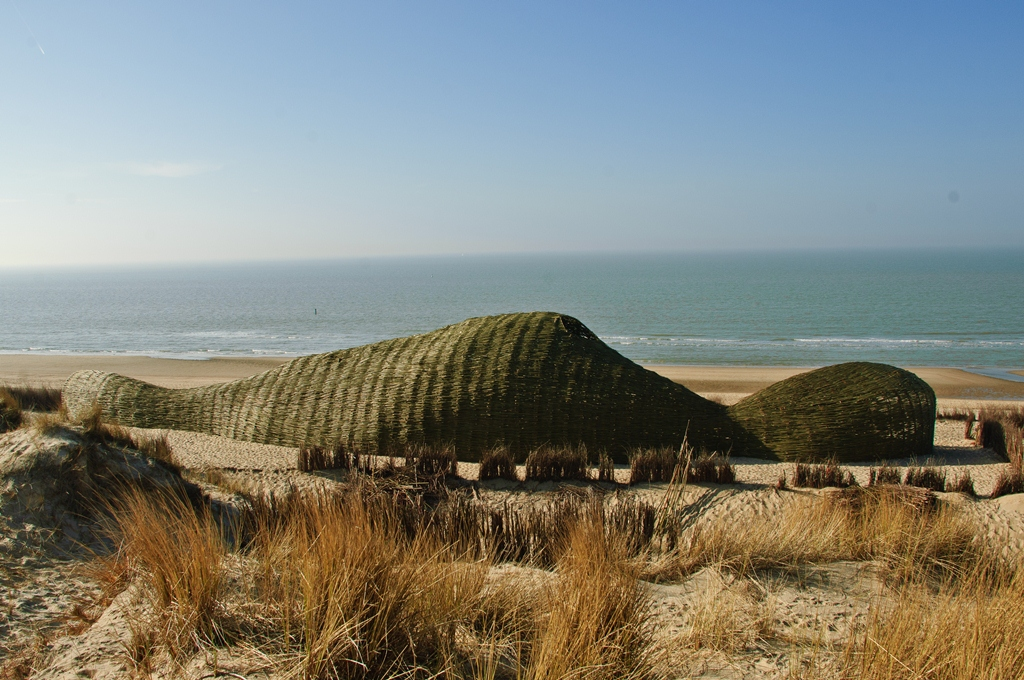
Art installation "Sandworm" in the Wenduine Dunes, Belgium, made entirely out of willow

- Warfare: Willow wood were used by the British to make parachute baskets throughout World War II. Being light and strong, they could be made in any shape and bounced on impact. British production of willow baskets was about 2000 tonnes per year by some 630 manufacturers employing 7000 basket makers. Lawrence Ogilvie (a plant pathologist who had studied and written his 1920s Cambridge University master's degree thesis about willow diseases) worked at Long Ashton Research Station, near Bristol and was much involved with these willows and their diseases.
- Dyeing: Willow is used to dye textiles, used to produce kimono. The kimono retailer Ginza Motoji hosts annual willow dyeing lessons with fifth grade students of Taimei Elementary School.
- Art: Willow is used to make charcoal (for drawing) as well as living sculptures, woven from live willow rods into shapes such as domes and tunnels. Willow stems are used to weave baskets and three-dimensional sculptures of animals and other figures. Willow stems are also used to create garden features, such as decorative panels and obelisks.
- Energy: There have been experiments or mathematical models in using willows for biomass or biofuel, in energy forestry systems, due to its fast growth. Programs in other countries are being developed through initiatives such as the Willow Biomass Project in the US, and the Energy Coppice Project in the UK. Willow may also be grown to produce charcoal.
- Environment: There has been research into possibly using willows for future biofiltration of wastewater (i.e. phytoremediation and land reclamation), although this is not commercially viable. They are used for streambank stabilisation (bioengineering), slope stabilisation, soil erosion control, shelterbelt and windbreak, and wildlife habitat. Willows are often planted on the borders of streams so their interlacing roots may protect the bank against the action of the water. The roots are often larger than the stem which grows from them.
- Food: Poor people at one time often ate willow catkins that had been cooked to form a mash. The inner bark can be eaten raw or cooked, as can the young leaves and underground shoots.

== Culture ==
The willow is one of the four species associated with the Jewish festival of Sukkot, or the Feast of Tabernacles, cited in Leviticus 23:40. Willow branches are used during the synagogue service on Hoshana Rabbah, the seventh day of Sukkot.

In Buddhism, a willow branch is one of the chief attributes of Guanyin, the bodhisattva of compassion. In traditional pictures of Guanyin, she is often shown seated on a rock with a willow branch in a vase of water at her side.

Orthodox churches often use willow branches in place of palms in the ceremonies on Palm Sunday.

In China, some people carry willow branches with them on the day of their Tomb Sweeping or Qingming Festival. Willow branches are also put up on gates and/or front doors, which they believe help ward off the evil spirits that wander on Qingming. Legend states that on Qingming Festival, the ruler of the underworld allows the spirits of the dead to return to earth. Since their presence may not always be welcome, willow branches keep them away. Taoist witches use a small carving made from willow wood for communicating with the spirits of the dead. The image is sent to the nether world, where the disembodied spirit is deemed to enter it, and give the desired information to surviving relatives on its return. The willow is a famous subject in many East Asian nations' cultures, particularly in pen and ink paintings from China and Japan.

A gisaeng (Korean courtesan) named Hongrang, who lived in the middle of the Joseon Dynasty, wrote the poem "By the willow in the rain in the evening", which she gave to her parting lover (Choi Gyeong-chang). Hongrang wrote:

... I will be the willow on your bedside.

In Japanese tradition, the willow is associated with ghosts. It is popularly supposed that a ghost will appear where a willow grows. Willow trees are also quite prevalent in folklore and myths. In English folklore, a willow tree is believed to be quite sinister, capable of uprooting itself and stalking travellers.

The Viminal Hill, one of the Seven Hills of Rome, derives its name from the Latin word for osier, viminia (pl.).

Hans Christian Andersen wrote a story called "Under the Willow Tree" (1853) in which children ask questions of a tree they call "willow-father", paired with another entity called "elder-mother".

"Green Willow" is a Japanese ghost story in which a young samurai falls in love with a woman called Green Willow who has a close spiritual connection with a willow tree. "The Willow Wife" is another, not dissimilar tale. "Wisdom of the Willow Tree" is an Osage Nation story in which a young man seeks answers from a willow tree, addressing the tree in conversation as 'Grandfather'.

== See also ==
- Aravah, the Hebrew name of the willow, for its ritual use during the Jewish Feast of Tabernacles
- Pollarding, technique of severe pruning or knotting of trees
- Sail, Ogham letter meaning "willow"
- Willow water, using the rooting hormone indolebutyric acid from willow branches to stimulate root growth in new cuttings
- Withy

== Bibliography ==
- Keeler, Harriet L. (1990). Our Native Trees and How to Identify Them. New York: Charles Scribner's Sons. Pages 393–395. ISBN 0-87338-838-0.
- Newsholme, C. (1992). Willows: The Genus Salix. ISBN 0-88192-565-9.
- Trybush, Sviatlana; Jahodová, Šárka; Macalpine, William; Karp, Angela (March 2008). "A Genetic Study of a Salix Germplasm Resource Reveals New Insights into Relationships Among Subgenera, Sections and Species". BioEnergy Research. 1 (1): 67–79. Bibcode:2008BioER...1...67T. doi:10.1007/s12155-008-9007-9.
- Warren-Wren, S. C. (1992). The Complete Book of Willows. ISBN 0-498-01262-X.
