= Halewijn =

Halewijn can have several meanings:

- Halewijn, a hamlet in Luchteren, Belgium
- Halluin or Halewijn, a commune in the Nord department, France
- Halewijn, a character in the Dutch folksong "Heer Halewijn" (Dutch for "Lord Halewijn")
  - Halewijn, an opera based on the Dutch folksong, see Heer Halewijn
