= Drongen =

Sub-municipality of the city of Ghent, Belgium

- Sub-municipality of Ghent
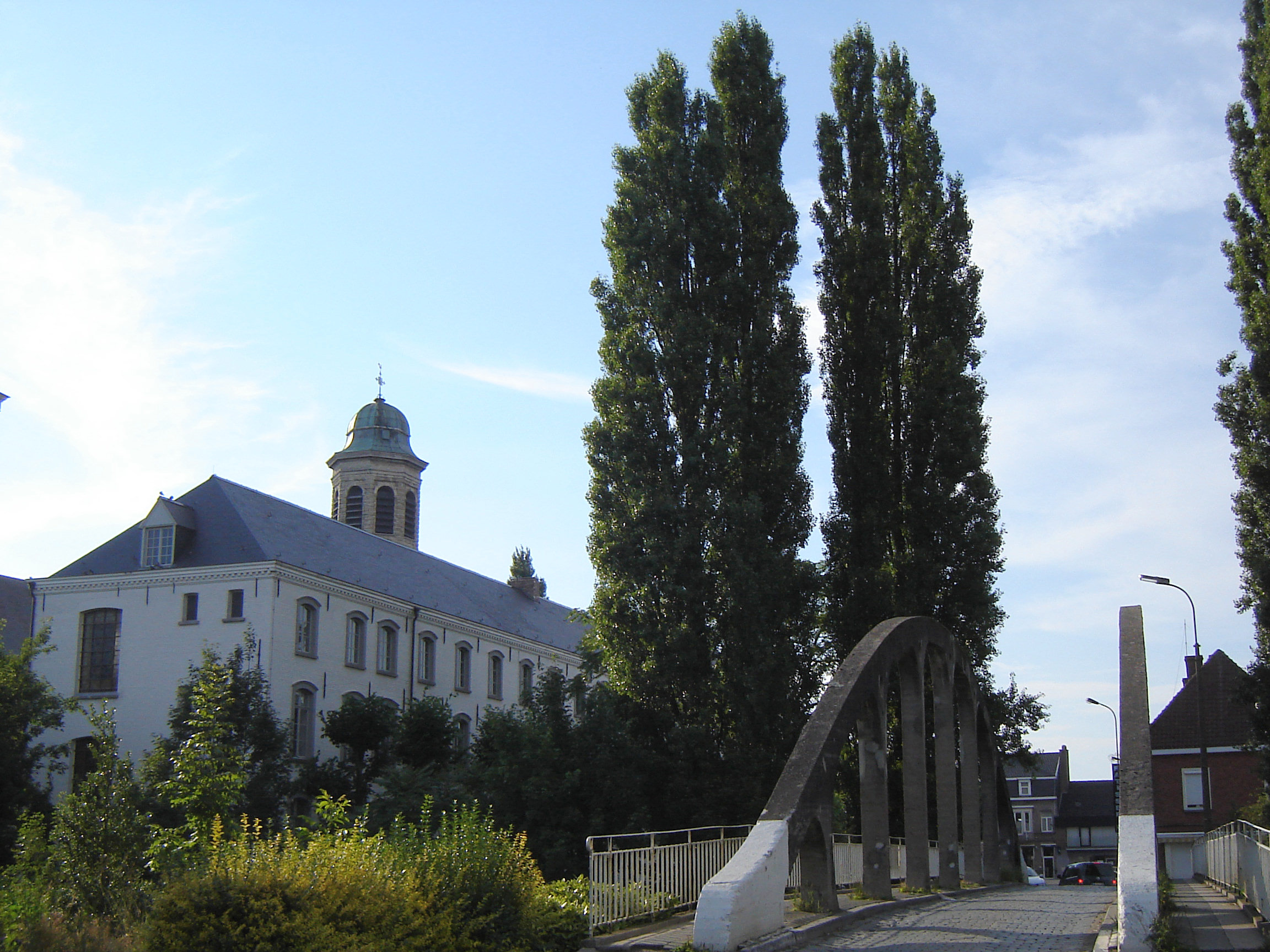
- View on Drongen, with the "Oude Abdij" (Old Abbey), the tower of the Church of Saint Gerulph, and the Pontbrug bridge over an arm of the Leie
- Interactive map of Drongen
- Location within Belgium Location within East Flanders
- Coordinates: 51°3′1″N 3°39′46″E
- Country: Belgium
- Community: Flemish Community
- Region: Flemish Region
- Province: East Flanders
- Arrondissement: Ghent
- Municipality: Ghent

Area
  - Total: 27.43 km^{2} (10.59 sq mi)

Population (2020-01-01)
  - Total: 13,038
  - Density: 475.3/km^{2} (1,231/sq mi)
- Postal codes: 9031
- Area codes: 09

Drongen (Dutch pronunciation: [ˈdrɔŋə(n)]; French: Tronchiennes, pronounced [tʁɔ̃ʃjɛn]) is a sub-municipality of the city of Ghent located in the province of East Flanders, Flemish Region, Belgium. It was a separate municipality until 1977. In 1967, part of the original municipality was already annexed to Ghent. On 1 January 1977, the municipality of Drongen was merged into Ghent.

Drongen is divided into three parishes: Drongen, Luchteren and Baarle.

== Monastery ==
Drongen is known for its early medieval monastery, Drongen Abbey, founded in the 7th century by the monk Amandus, the Missionary of the Leie and Schelde. Destroyed by the Normans in 853, the monastery was rebuilt by the counts of Flanders. The monastery was the victim of the religious wars following the Reformation, and in 1578 it was once again destroyed by Calvinists.

In 1638, the abbey church was rebuilt and between 1638 and 1698 the monastery was restored. After a fire in 1727, the church tower was restored once again in 1734, with a distinctive appearance. In 1797, the French occupied and sold the abbey. In 1804, Lieven Bauwens used the monastery as a textile plant. The current monastery and abbey church date from 1859 and remain in use as a spiritual centre run by the Society of Jesus dedicated to the teachings of Ignatius of Loyola.

== Notable people ==
Drongen is the birthplace of professional footballer Kevin De Bruyne.

== Gallery ==
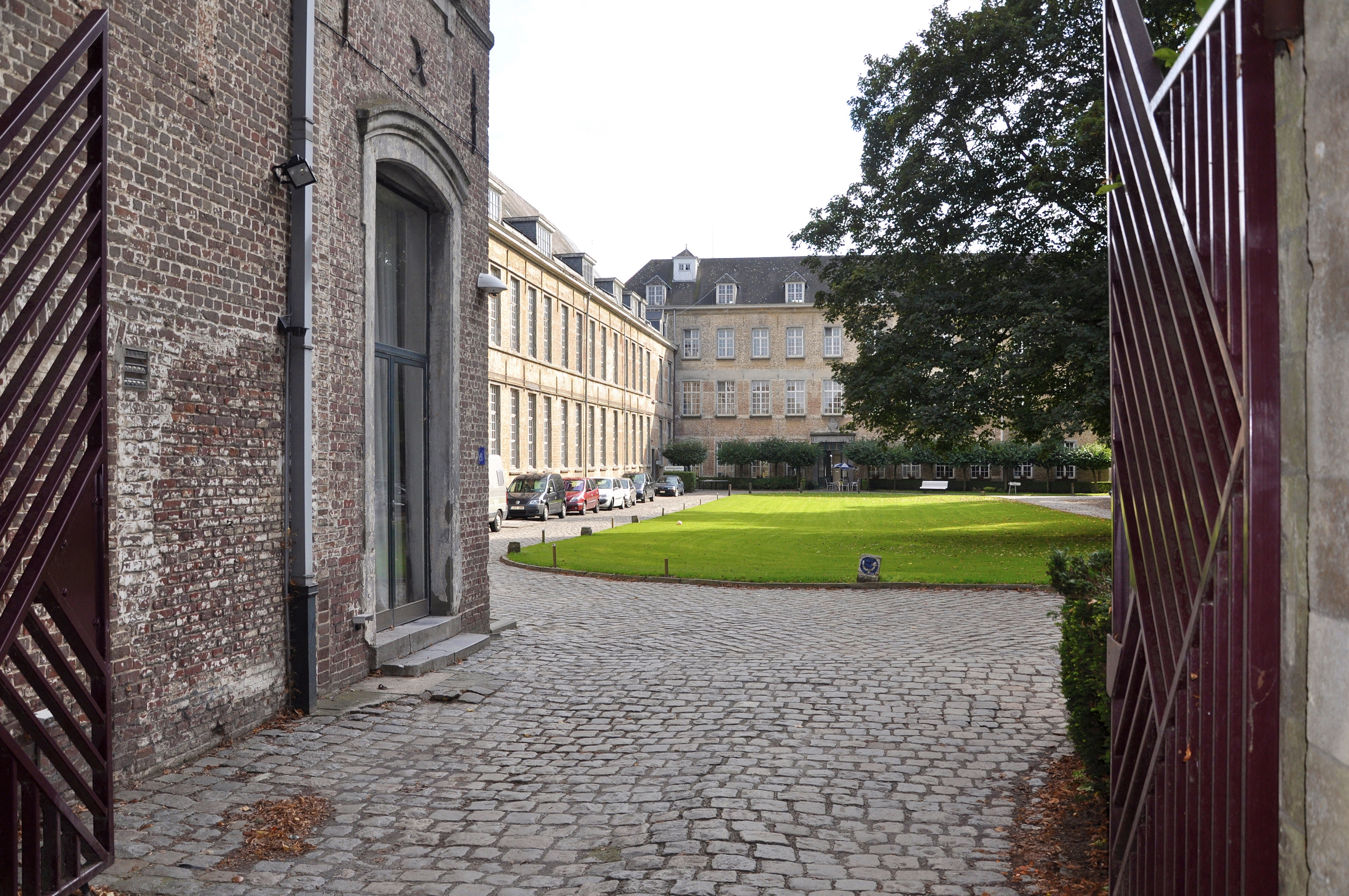
Drongen Abbey

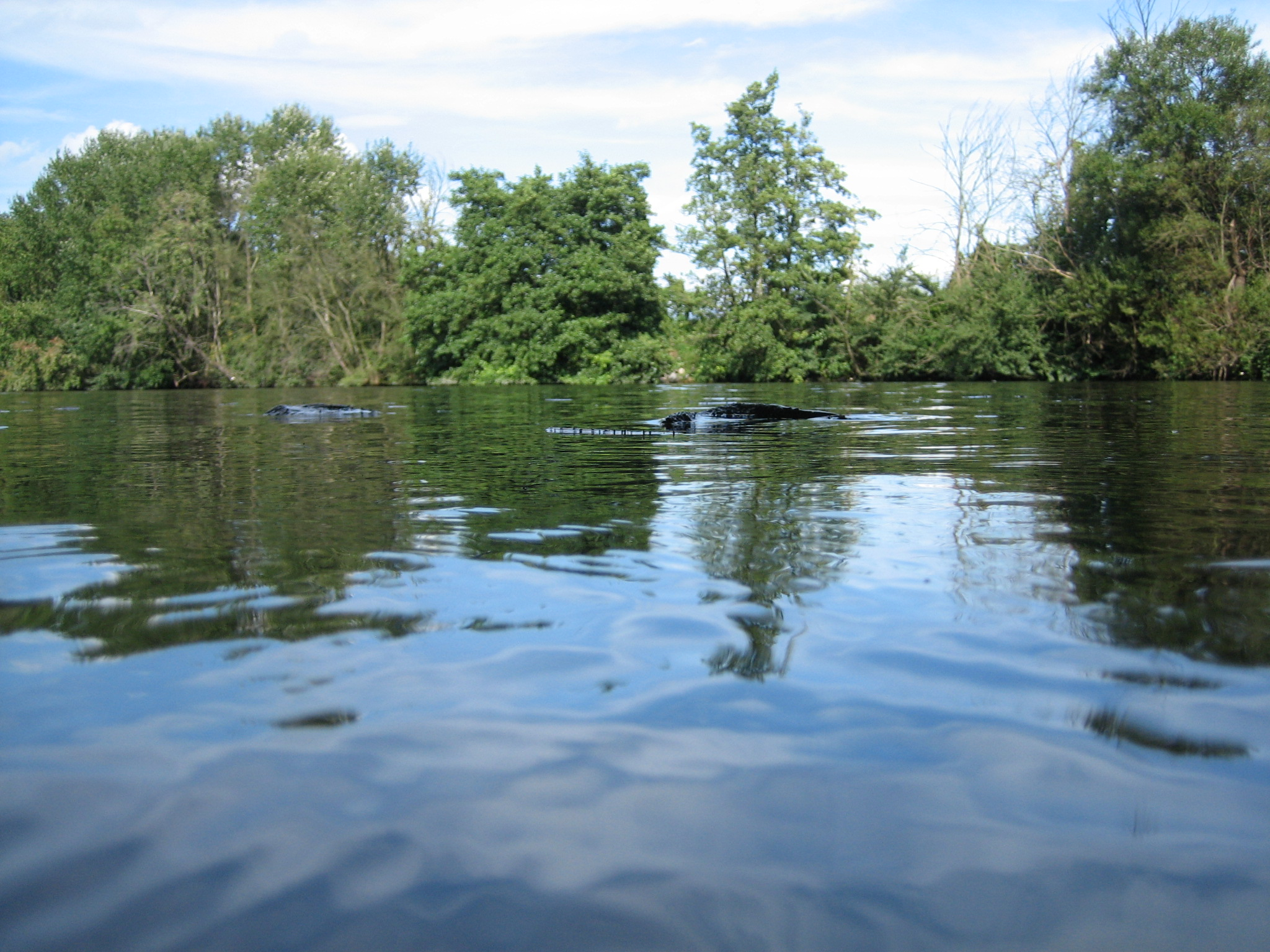
The Leie river at Baarle, Drongen

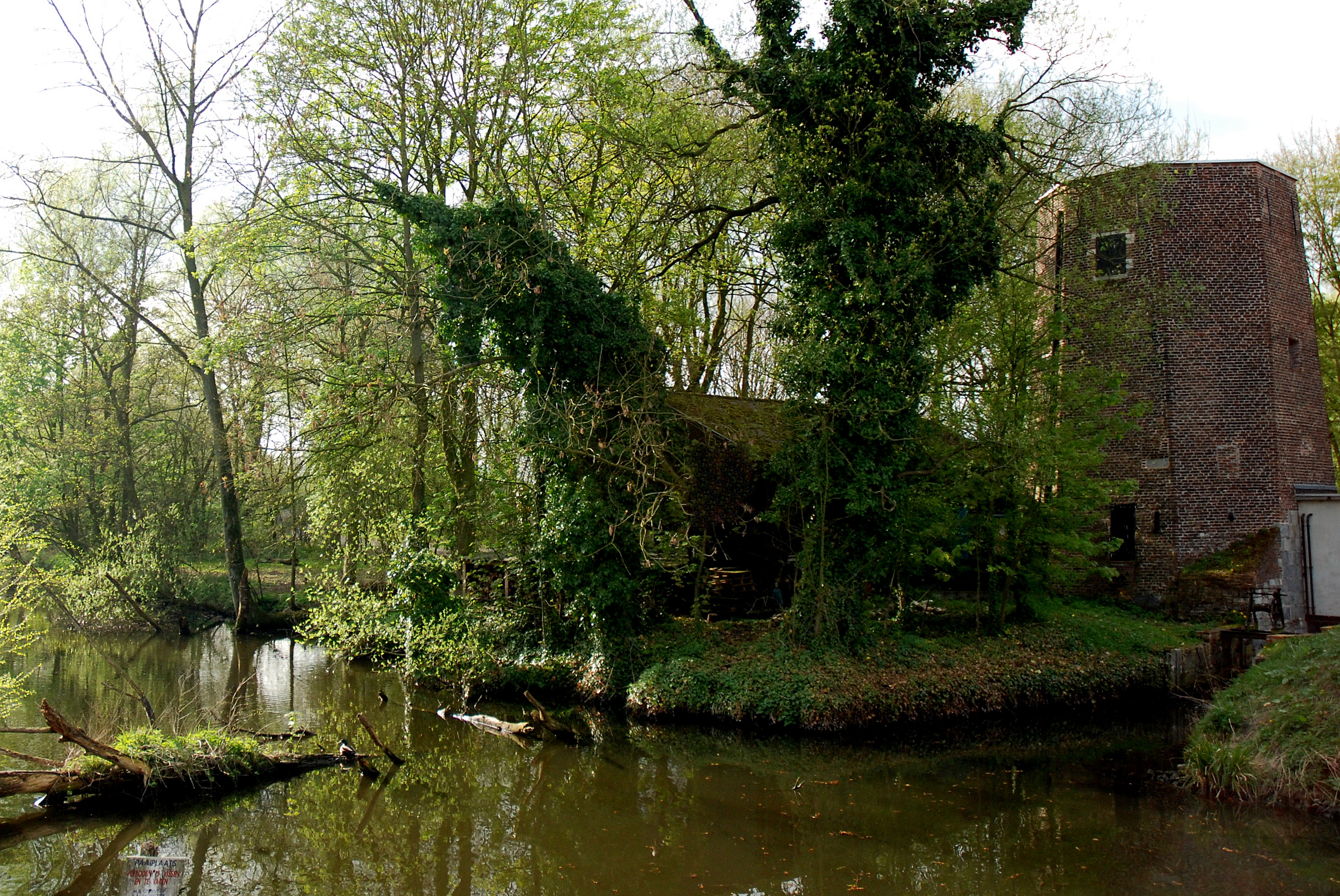
The Hoosmolen in the Bourgoyen-Ossemeersen
