= Willow water =

Willow water is a traditional method to extract the rooting hormone indolebutyric acid from willow (Salix) trees, which is believed to be present in sufficient quantities to stimulate root growth.
