= Charterhouse of Sint-Bruno in Eremo =

Former Carthusian monastery in Ghent, Belgium

- Interactive map of Charterhouse of Sint-Bruno in Eremo

Monastery information
- Denomination: Third Order of Saint Francis, Carthusians
- Established: 1456 by the Third Order of Saint Francis, October 1584 by the Carthusians
- Disestablished: 17 March 1783
- Dedication: Bruno of Cologne
- Dedicated: October 1584

People
- Important associated figures: Lieven Bauwens

Architecture
- Status: Closed due to religious reform under Joseph II. Now a psychiatric hospital.

Site
- Location: 9 Fratersplaat, Meerhem, Ghent
- Country: Belgium
- Coordinates: 51°03′45.68″N 03°43′25.13″E
- Public access: no
- Website: https://www.pcgs.be/

The Charterhouse of Sint-Bruno in Eremo (also Ghent Charterhouse) was a charterhouse, or Carthusian monastery, in Ghent, Belgium. It was originally built around 1480 under the name Sint-Jan in Eremo by members of the Third Order of Saint Francis, who occupied the premises until 1578, when they were expelled by the Calvinists. The charterhouse was dissolved in 1783 during the Josephine reforms. The buildings later passed into the ownership of the industrialist Lieven Bauwens. In 1814 the Treaty of Ghent was signed here. The site, including the surviving buildings from the monastic period, is now a psychiatric institution, Sint-Jan de Deo.

== History ==
=== Third Order of Saint Francis ===
Members of the Third Order of Saint Francis (Franciscan tertiaries) probably initially settled on the site of their establishment around 1457, with the goal of caring for the elderly and mentally ill. Construction began in 1480, after money had been given to the community by Jan Reme.

In 1578, the Franciscans were expelled from the monastery by Calvinists, but the premises were not completely destroyed.

=== Carthusian Order and Koningsdal ===
Koningsdal Charterhouse in Rooigem, a short distance outside Ghent, was looted during the Great Iconoclasm, then completely destroyed by the Calvinists two years later in 1568. The Carthusian monks fled for six years, eventually returning to Ghent to inhabit the old monastery of the Franciscan Tertiaries. In October 1584, the monks officially moved in, renaming it Sint-Bruno in Eremo. Some buildings had to be reconstructed, having been partially destroyed by the Calvinists.

The monks contracted master bricklayer Tobias d'Oosterlinck to build the large monastic church, which was completed in 1561. Some time between 1558 and 1561 the prior's house was built, under the then Prior Justus de Nokere.

During the Nine Years' War, part of the monastery was a powder magazine for the English.

The Emperor Joseph II declared sweeping religious reforms that forced the charterhouse to close. It was dissolved on 17 March 1783 and was sold at public auction.

=== After the Carthusian Order ===
Attempts were made by the Carthusian monks to return to the monastery after the religious restrictions were lifted, but proved unsuccessful as not enough money could be raised to support the cost of living.

Between 1792 and 1795 the monastery served as a hospital for the French and Austrian armies. After the closure of the hospital in 1795, several of the outbuildings were broken down for materials by the owner. The company Trollier & Cie bought the site, and rented it to Pierre-Abraham Van Loo, who used the space to run his butchery and wagon businesses. Then for a short period the building served as a dance hall.

==== Lieven Bauwens ====
Bauwens, an industrialist and native of Ghent, rented the grounds of the monastery for his leather tanning business in the 1790s, then in 1799 bought the site in order to develop his textile mill. Bauwens made several renovations to the buildings, partitioning the church for his business, and turning the prior's house into a luxury residence, with a staircase designed by the French engineer Dieudonné. The residence was supposedly visited by Napoleon in 1803 and 1810.

==== Treaty of Ghent ====
The British plenipotentiaries stayed in the former prior's home renovated by Bauwens. The Treaty of Ghent was finally signed on 24 December 1814 in the hall of mirrors in Bauwen's former home.

== Modern use ==
The site, including the prior's house with the hall of mirrors and the former church as well as 19th and 20th century structures, is now a psychiatric clinic, Sint-Jan de Deo.
