= Lieven Bauwens =

Belgian entrepreneur and spy (1769–1822)

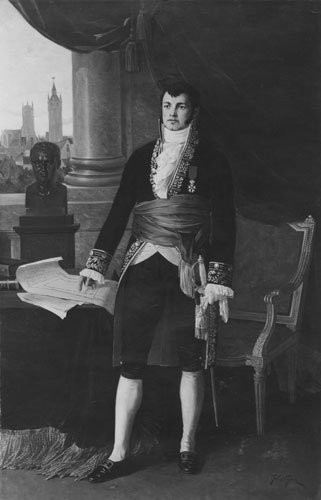
- Born: 14 June 1769; Ghent
- Died: March 17, 1822 (aged 52); Paris
- Resting place: Père Lachaise Cemetery
- Occupation: Industrialist, spy, entrepreneur, engineer
- Relatives: Françoise Bauwens
- Awards: Chevalier of the Legion of Honour (Napoleon)

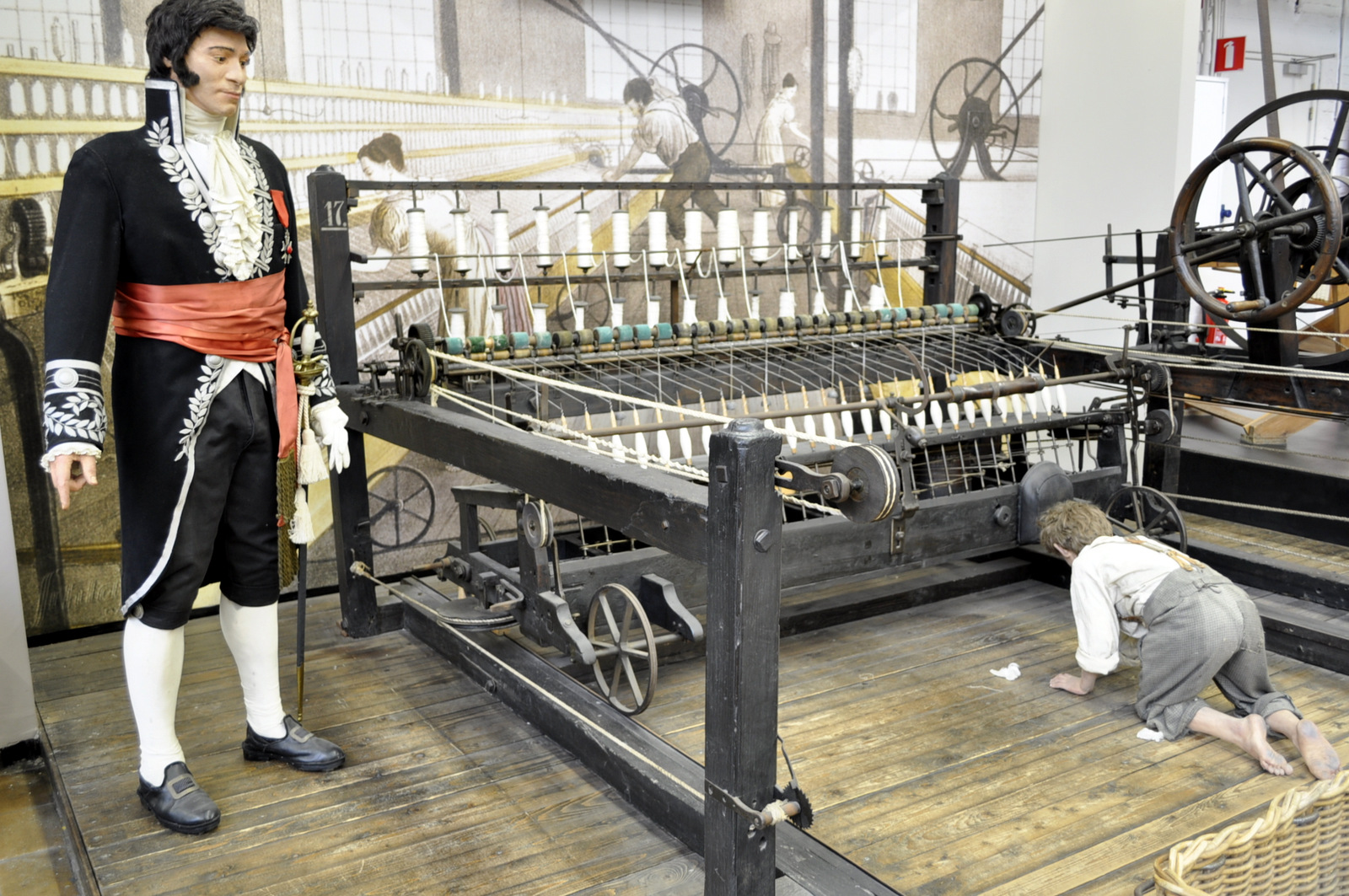
Lieven Bauwens and his Mule Jenny in the former MIAT. The mannequin was created after a painting by Félix Cogen in the Royal Museum of the Armed Forces and Military History in Brussels.

Lieven Bauwens (14 June 1769 in Ghent – 17 March 1822 in Paris) was an entrepreneur and industrial spy from the Austrian Netherlands. He was sent to Great Britain at a young age and brought a spinning mule and skilled workers to the European continent.

He started textile plants in Paris (1798) and Ghent (1799). In Ghent he was appointed mayor in 1800, but resigned after one year.

As a leading industrialist, he was visited by Napoleon in May of 1810, where he was offered the title of Count, which he declined, and awarded the Legion d'Honneur. He was also awarded a gold medal by the city of Ghent on May 22, 1805 for his contribution to the industry of the city.

The spinning mule that was brought to Ghent can still be visited, in the Museum of Industry (Ghent).

== Early life ==
Lieven Bauwens was born 14 June 1769 in Ghent. He was born eldest of thirteen children to George Jean Bauwens and his second wife, Jeanne van Peteghem, who were guild tanners.

He had four brothers, François, Pierre, Jean, and Charles.

Early in his life, Bauwens was charged overseer of a tannery named Huydersvetters-Hoeck in Ghent. at the time of his appointment, he would have been at most sixteen.

At seventeen, Bauwens' father sent him to Great Britain to work and learn the tanning craft in the great tannery of Undershell and Fox. In 1789 he returned to Ghent with the newfound knowledge of the tanning techniques used in Great Britain, where he started his own tannery in the former Carthusian Monastery, employing 550 large tanks. The Monastery had closed in 1783 under the religious reforms of Joseph II. The scale of the tanning operation at the monastery enabled Bauwens to start selling his leather products back in London. The volume of goods being produced by the tannery were so great that Bauwens was paying as much as 450,000-500,000 Francs just in import costs to bring the leather products to Great Britain.

Bauwens' tannery was also awarded a royal warrant of appointment to provide leather products to the French Revolutionary Army, which also greatly contributed to his wealth.

Tanning was not Bauwens' passion, however. He only entered into the trade to appease his parents, who desired that he follow them into the tanning business. From a young age, he had an interest in machines, reportedly assembling a working clock at the age of 12. His interest later turned his focus on bringing the textile machines of Great Britain to mainland Europe.

== Personal life ==
Bauwens had a wife, Mary Kenyon Bauwens, (1784-1834), as well as one daughter Elvine Marie Bernardine and two sons, Napoleon and Felix.

Mary Kenyon's father was James Kenyon, a Manchester machine mechanic who had illegally sold Bauwens a Spinning Jenny, later traveling to Ghent with several other English artisans to work with Bauwens in his new textile mill.

Bauwens probably lived primarily at his home in Drongen (Tronchiennes), where both of his children were born, as well as where he visited with John Quincy Adams.

== Scheme to bring textile production to Flanders ==
In 1798, Bauwens petitioned the French Directory, which had recently annexed Belgium, to support his plan to bring the British textile industry to continental Europe. He purchased the parts for a Spinning Jenny from James Kenyon, planning to hide the parts inside sugar and coffee crates, under the guise that he was expanding into the colonial produce market.

The plan was initially successful, with a first shipment of smuggled parts and artisans leaving for Hamburg without issue. A second shipment was preparing to leave from Gravesend, when the wife of Harding, one of the artisans Bauwens had hired, started a violent argument with her husband about the departure. The resulting fight summoned the police, who arrested Harding and prevented the shipment for leaving for Hamburg. Bauwens, who had been watching nearby, narrowly escaped the scene and quickly chartered a ship to take him to Hamburg. Lord James Crawford of the British forces attempted to stop Lieven's vessel at sea, but he successfully arrived at the port.

Upon receiving intelligence from Lord Crawford The British seized Bauwens' parts from the shipment leaving Gravesend, as well as more parts Bauwens had stored in Manchester, also slated to be sent to mainland Europe. The British crown sentenced Bauwens to death, hanging an effigy of him, as well as a prison sentence given to his accomplice Harding.

Upon his return to Europe, Bauwens reunited with his parts and laborers, forming a textile mill in Passy, Paris at the site of a former Grandmont monastery in 1798.

== Textile mill in Ghent ==
Bauwens purchased the former Carthusian monastery in Ghent, the Charterhouse of Sint-Bruno in Eremo, for the site of his textile mill around 1799. The funds to purchase the site likely came from the purchase of silver from churches and convents, which Bauwens melted and shipped to the bank of Amsterdam.

The prior's home was turned into a luxury home in 1803. The British diplomats sent for peace negotiations during the War of 1812 were housed in the monastery from August to December 1814, and the location was also where the Treaty of Ghent was finally signed.

== Other ventures ==
Around 1805 Bauwens founded another textile mill outside of Ghent in Drongen, at Drongen Abbey.

As mentioned before, Bauwens was involved in the purchase of silver from churches and convents, which proved lucrative.

== Downfall ==
The effects of the Continental Blockade and the fall of the French Empire marked the end of Bauwens' success. He declared bankruptcy in 1814, and his property was liquidated.

Bauwens petitioned King William I, The Infanta of Spain, Henry Clay, and John Quincy Adams with the hopes of garnering support for the establishment of his cotton industries in their respective countries, with no success.

In 1819, he moved to Paris, obtained a patent for working with silk waste, sold partial rights to the patent and saw the creation of twenty five silk waste machines. Unfortunately, he was not able to rebuild his fortune due to dying of an aneurysm at 53.

== Legacy ==
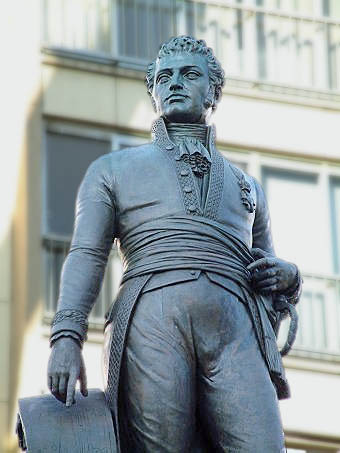
Lieven Bauwens statue in Ghent

A square in Ghent is named in his honor, featuring a statue of him. The statue was sculpted by the Ghent sculptor Pieter De Vigne (fr).

== See also ==
- William Cockerill
