= Drongen Abbey =

Monastery in Ghent, Belgium

Coordinates: 51°02′59″N 3°39′50″E

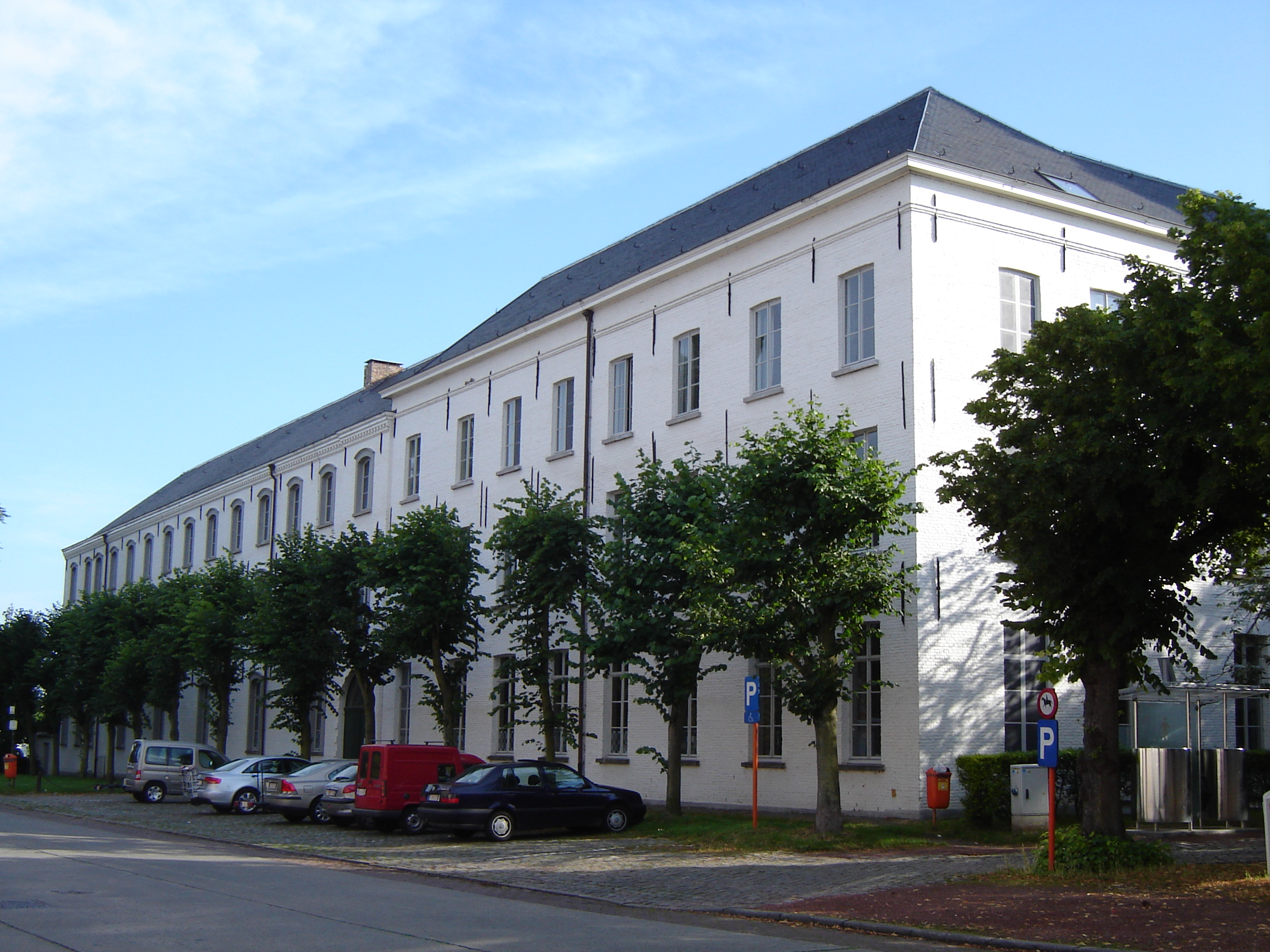
East front

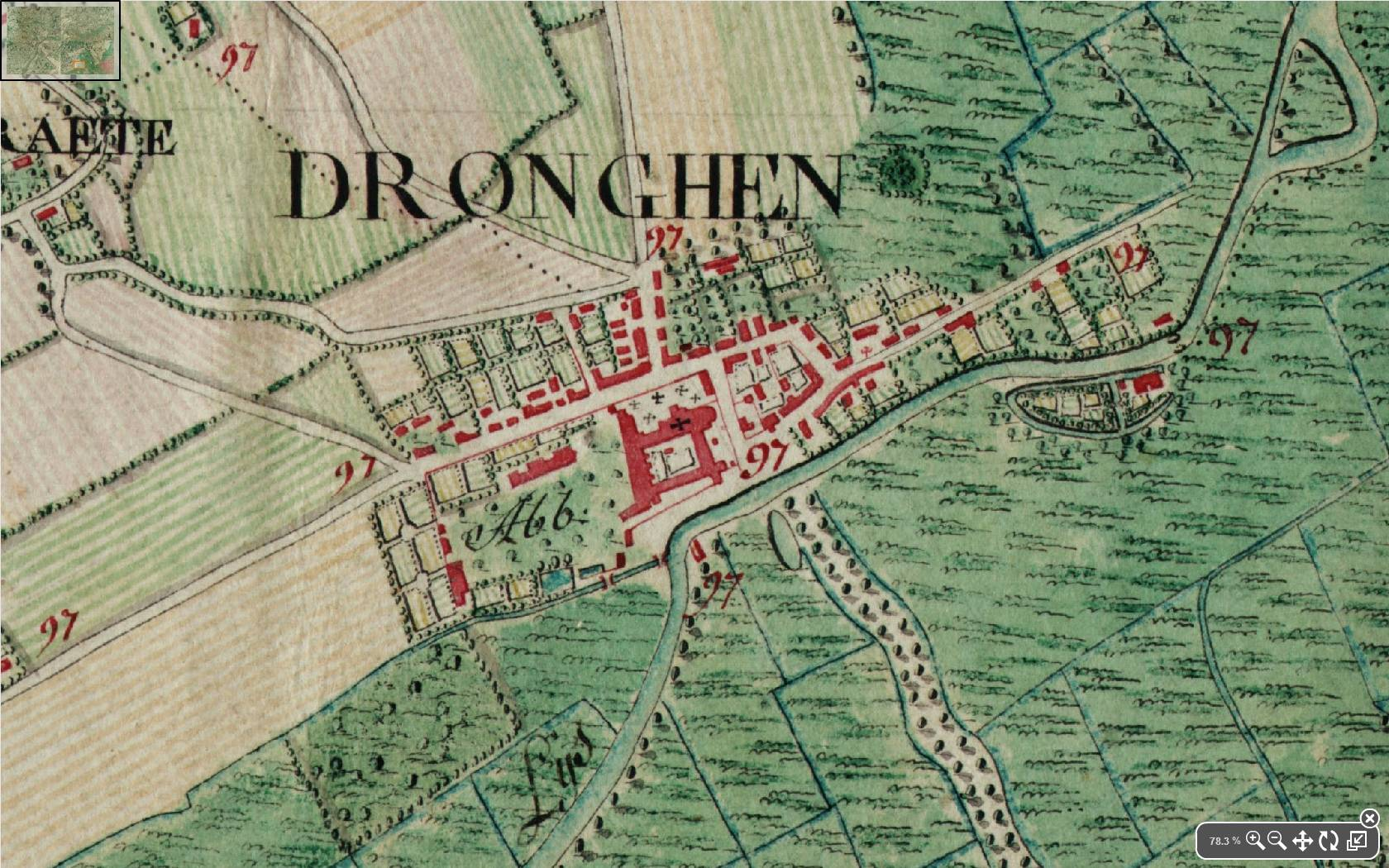
Drongen Abbey on the Ferraris map

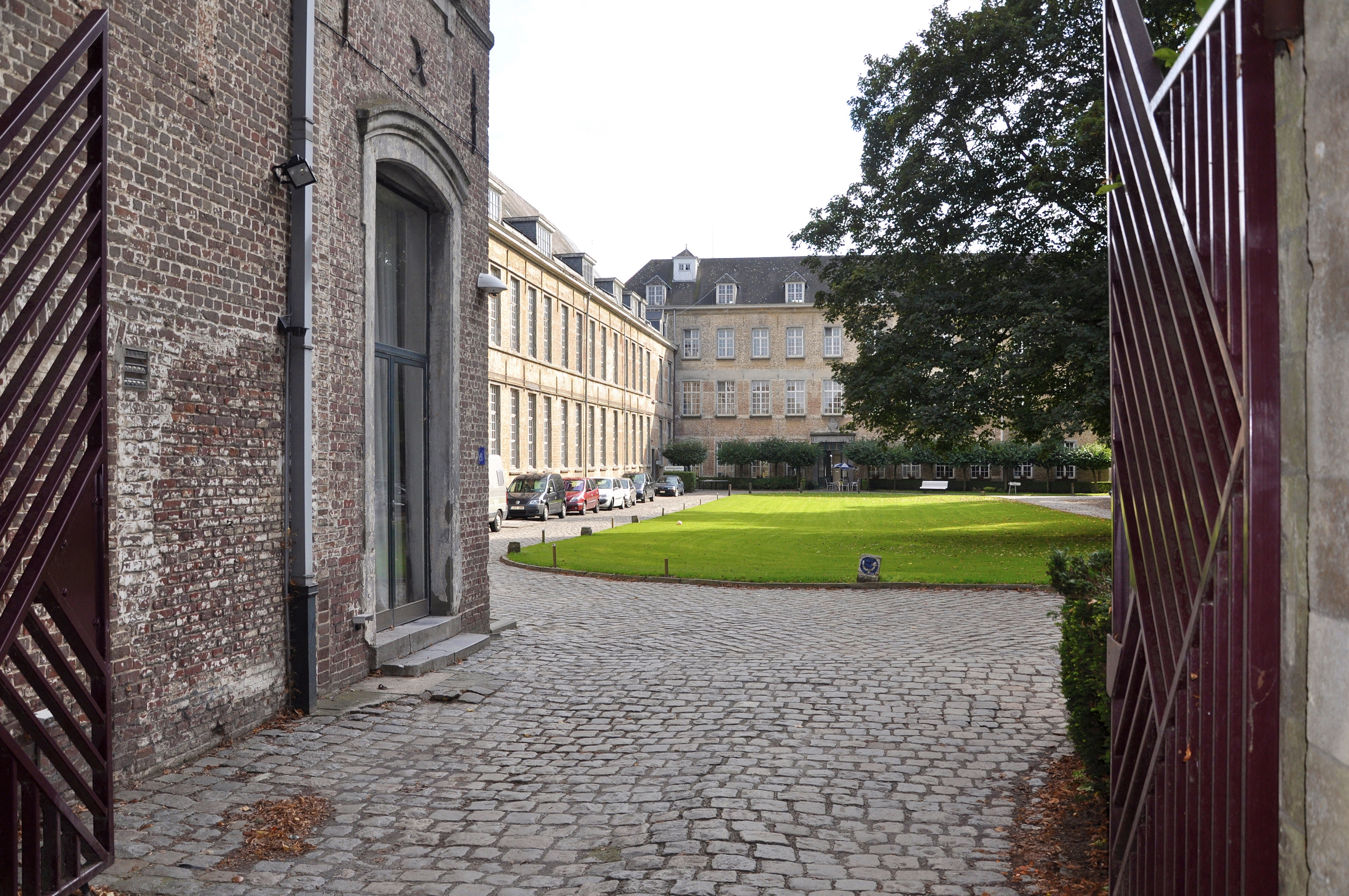
Entrance

Drongen Abbey, or the Old Abbey, Drongen (Dutch: Abdij van Drongen, Oude Abdij van Drongen), is a monastic complex on the River Leie in Drongen, a part of the city of Ghent in East Flanders, Belgium.

Formerly a Premonstratensian abbey, since 1837 the premises have belonged to the Jesuits. In 1998 the whole property, including the garden, was declared a protected monument.

== History ==
=== Early days ===
In the Middle Ages there were two legends regarding the abbey's foundation in the 7th century. According to one, the abbey was built by a certain Basinus, king of Basotes; according to the other, its founder was Saint Amandus, who also founded in Ghent during the same period St. Peter's Abbey and St. Bavo's Abbey. The first occupants were secular canons. The Normans destroyed the abbey in 853 but under Baldwin II, Count of Flanders (879–918), lord of Drongen, it was rebuilt.

=== Premonstratensians ===
In 1136 Iwein, Count of Aalst, lord of Waas, Drongen and Liedekerke, founded a Premonstratensian abbey at Salegem (Vrasene, Beveren). Two years later, in 1138, the new abbey was moved to Drongen, when the canons accepted the Premonstratensian rules.

In 1566 the abbey suffered from the Beeldenstormer (Iconoclasts), and in 1578, during the Ghent Republic, the Calvinists drove out the fathers, who took refuge in the Hof van Drongen, and destroyed the abbey. Its possessions fell into the hands of William the Silent, but were given back by his heirs.

The abbey church was rebuilt in 1638, and the monastic buildings between 1638 and 1698, leaving the abbey much the same as it is now.

In 1796, during the French Revolution, the fathers were again driven out, and the abbey suppressed and sold off. Lieven Bauwens installed a cotton mill, which went bankrupt in 1836, and a dyeworks using madder root.

=== Jesuits ===
In 1836 the Jesuits bought part of the abbey buildings for the use of their novices, and in 1848 they bought the remainder of the property. The training continued until 1968, when it stopped for want of vocations, but they continued to provide meditations and retreats, for individuals and groups, and thus the abbey became a retreat centre. Older Jesuits continued to live there, and the abbey also became a Jesuit retirement home.

The octagonal abbey church in white stone, with a small cupola, was rebuilt in 1734 after a fire. Known as St. Gerolf's Church, it now serves as the parish church of the centre of Drongen.

== See also ==
- List of Jesuit sites in Belgium
- Diocese of Ghent
