= Luchteren =

Neighbourhood of the city of Ghent, Belgium

- Village of Ghent
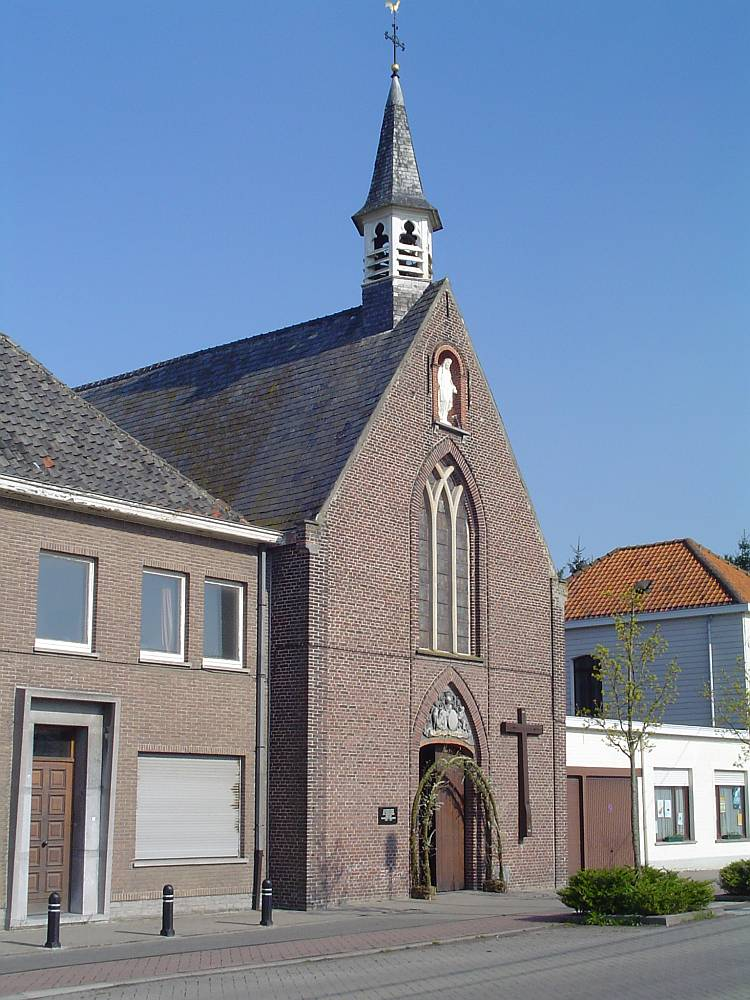
- Church of Our Lady
- Interactive map of Luchteren
- Location within Belgium Location within East Flanders
- Coordinates: 51°3′50″N 3°38′2″E
- Country: Belgium
- Community: Flemish Community
- Region: Flemish Region
- Province: East Flanders
- Arrondissement: Ghent
- Municipality: Ghent

Area
  - Total: 8.45 km^{2} (3.26 sq mi)

Population
  - Total: 2,750
- Postal codes: 9031
- Area codes: 09

Luchteren (Dutch pronunciation: [ˈlʏxtərə(n)]) is a village in East Flanders, Belgium, within the municipality of Ghent.

Luchteren is the most rural parish of the sub-municipality of Drongen, located on the main N461 road.

Most shops and other important features are located in the main streets Beekstraat, Antoon Catriestraat, Boskeetstraat and Gavergrachtstraat, the last one holding the small parish church, the only school and the only bar of the village. Halewijn is a distinct neighbourhood within Luchteren.

Luchteren borders the Drongen parishes of Baarle (south) and Central Drongen (east), the Ghent submunicipality of Mariakerke (northeast), the Nevele submunicipality of Merendree, and Vinderhoute, Lovendegem's only submunicipality.
