= Bourgoyen-Ossemeersen =

Coordinates: 51°3′40.69″N 3°40′28.96″E

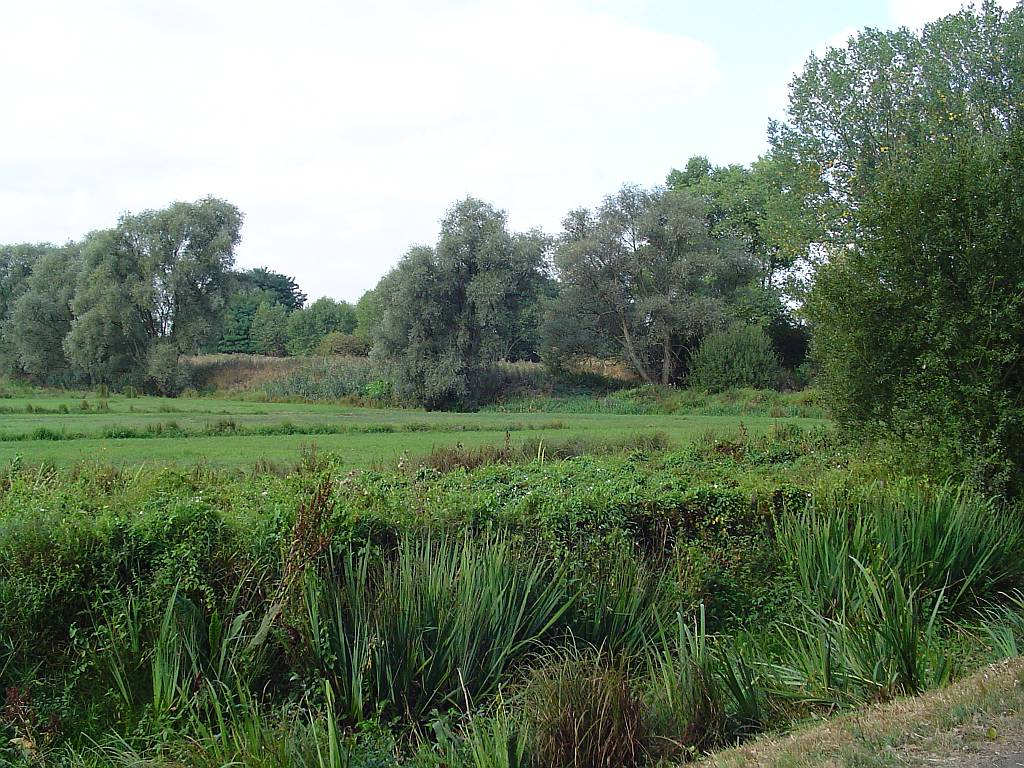
Bourgoyen-Ossemeersen nature reserve

Bourgoyen-Ossemeersen is a nature reserve on the outskirts of the Belgian city of Ghent. It lies mainly in the district of Mariakerke and covers 230 hectares. It mostly consists of wet, often flooded, meadows interspersed with ditches and canals, and is an important wintering area for water birds. It acts as a buffer zone between the city and the R4 ring road's noise-reducing barriers have been erected to lessen the road's impact on the wildlife.

There are three main trails through the reserve and at the centre is the Valkenhuis or Falcon House, a historic building previously used by falconers for the training of birds for the Counts of Flanders. A visitor information centre was built in 2006 at the entrance to the reserve.

== Fauna ==
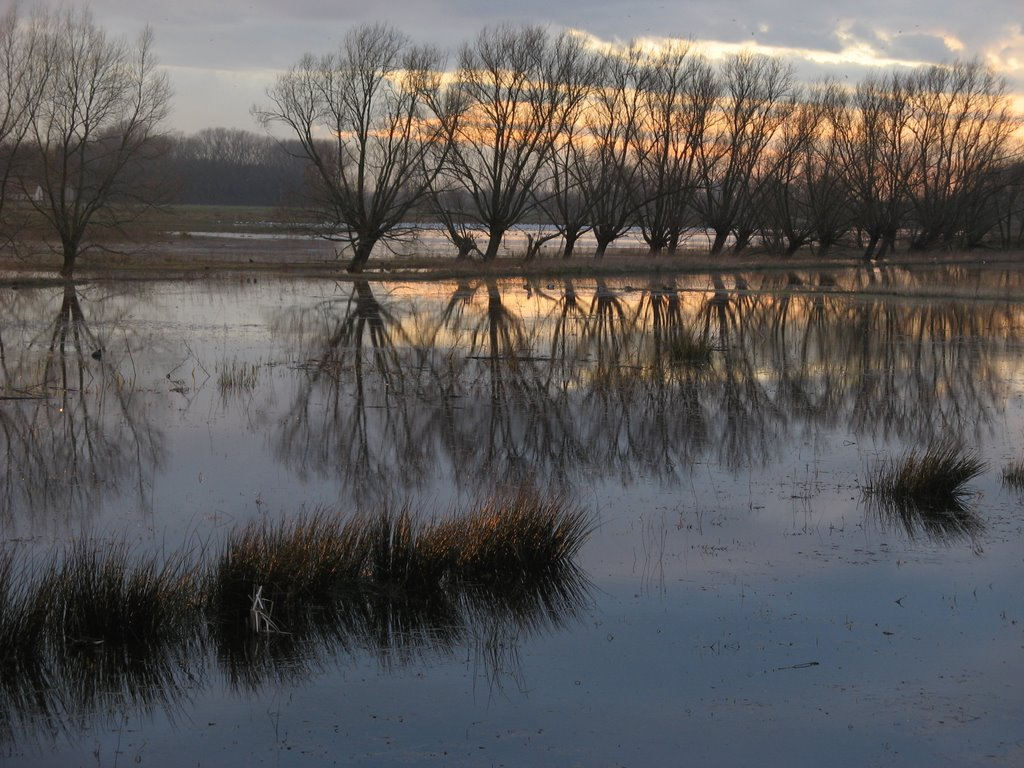
Willow trees at sunset

The reserve is best known for the large numbers of ducks and geese that overwinter here on the flooded grassland. The commonest wildfowl are wigeon, teal and shovelers. Also present are smaller numbers of pintail, gadwall, shelduck, tufted duck and pochard. There are also Canada geese and barnacle geese, neither of which are native species. Other water birds include lapwings, curlews, ruff and snipe.

Some of these waterfowl are present in the reserve throughout the year and others are summer visitors. Lapwings, gadwall and black-tailed godwits breed here as do the great crested grebe, the little grebe and the kingfisher, and there is a large colony of cormorants at the west end of the park.

Small passerine birds nesting here include the reed warbler, the marsh warbler, the sedge warbler, the reed bunting, the willow tit, the bluethroat, the common grasshopper warbler and the Cetti's warbler. Other nesting species include the hobby hawk, the Eurasian sparrowhawk, the lesser spotted woodpecker, the cuckoo and the tawny owl.

Near the water are dragonflies and in the water are many species of aquatic invertebrates. Amphibians present in the park include smooth and Alpine newts, the common toad, the common frog and the green frog. Land mammals include hares and rabbits, and many species of bats, mice and shrews. The predatory mammals in the reserve include the red fox, the stoat, the weasel, the pole cat and the beech marten.
