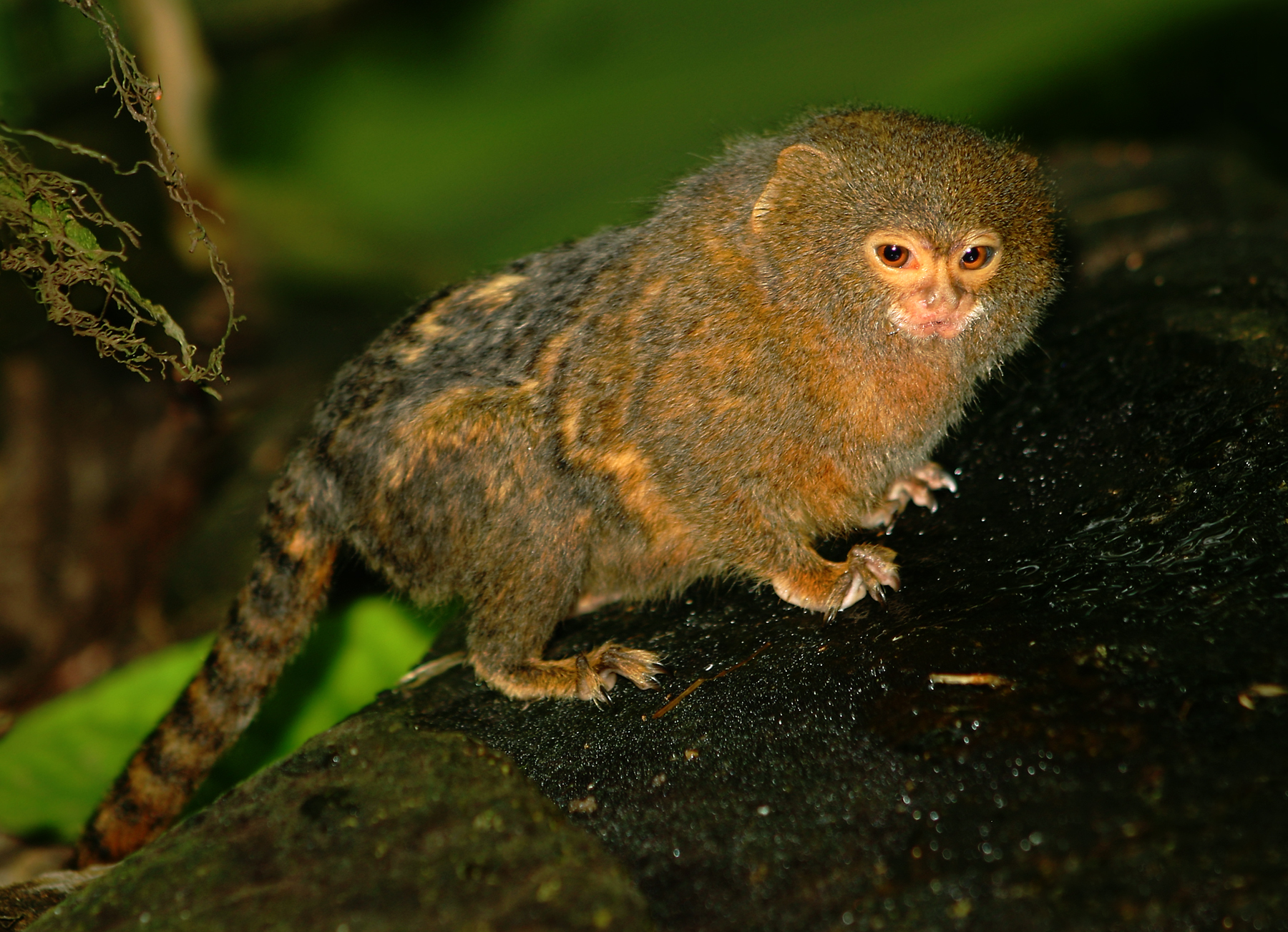

Scientific classification
- Kingdom: Animalia
- Phylum: Chordata
- Class: Mammalia
- Order: Primates
- Family: Callitrichidae
- Genus: Cebuella; J. E. Gray, 1866

Type species
- Iacchus pygmaea Spix, 1823

Species
- Cebuella pygmaea; Cebuella niveiventris
- species range

= Pygmy marmoset =

Genus of monkey

Pygmy marmosets (genus Cebuella) are small New World monkeys. The genus consists of two species, the Western pygmy marmoset (Cebuella pygmaea), and the Eastern pygmy marmoset, (Cebuella niveiventris). The smallest monkeys in the world, at just over 100 g (3.5 oz), they are native to rainforests of the western Amazon Basin in South America. They are generally found in evergreen and river-edge forests and are gum-feeding specialists, or gummivores.

About 83% of pygmy marmosets live in stable troops of two to nine individuals, including a dominant male, a breeding female, and up to four successive litters of offspring. The modal size of a standard stable troop is six individuals. Although most groups consist of family members, some may also include one or two additional adult members. Members of the group communicate using a complex system including vocal, chemical, and visual signals. Three main calling signals depend on the distance the call needs to travel. These monkeys may also make visual displays when threatened or to show dominance. Chemical signaling using secretions from glands on the chest and genital area allow the female to indicate to the male when she is able to reproduce. The female gives birth to twins twice a year and the parental care is shared among the group.

Pygmy marmosets are viewed as somewhat different from typical marmosets, most of which are classified in the genera Callithrix (where they were placed in a subgenus) and Mico, and thus they are accorded their own genus, Cebuella, within the family Callitrichidae. Their biggest threats are habitat loss and the pet trade.

== Evolution and taxonomy ==
Debate has arisen among primatologists concerning the proper genus in which to place pygmy marmosets. An examination of the interstitial retinol binding protein nuclear gene (IRBP) in three marmoset species showed that Callithrix as constructed in the 1990s also needed to include C. pygmaea to be monophyletic, and that the times of separation of C. pygmaea and the C. argentata and C. jacchus species groups from one another are less than 5 million years ago, as might be expected for species of the same genus. However, subsequent separation of the argentata and jacchus species groups into different genera (the argentata group having been moved to Mico) justifies maintaining a separate genus for the pygmy marmosets, as Callithrix is no longer paraphyletic.

The two species described of the pygmy marmoset are:

Genus Cebuella – Gray, 1866 – two species
Common name	Scientific name and subspecies	Range	Size and ecology	IUCN status and estimated population
Western pygmy marmoset	Cebuella pygmaea (Spix, 1823)	Bolivia, Brazil, Colombia, Ecuador and Peru	Size: Habitat: Diet:	VU
Eastern pygmy marmoset	Cebuella niveiventris Lönnberg, 1940	Peru, Brazil, Ecuador and Bolivia.	Size: Habitat: Diet:	VU

Few morphological differences occur between these species, as they may differ only slightly in color, and they are separated only by geographical barriers, including large rivers in South America.

The evolution of this genus diverged in terms of body mass from typical primates, with a high rate of body-mass reduction. This involves large decreases in prenatal and postnatal growth rates, furthering the thought that progenesis played a role in the evolution of this animal.

== Physical description ==
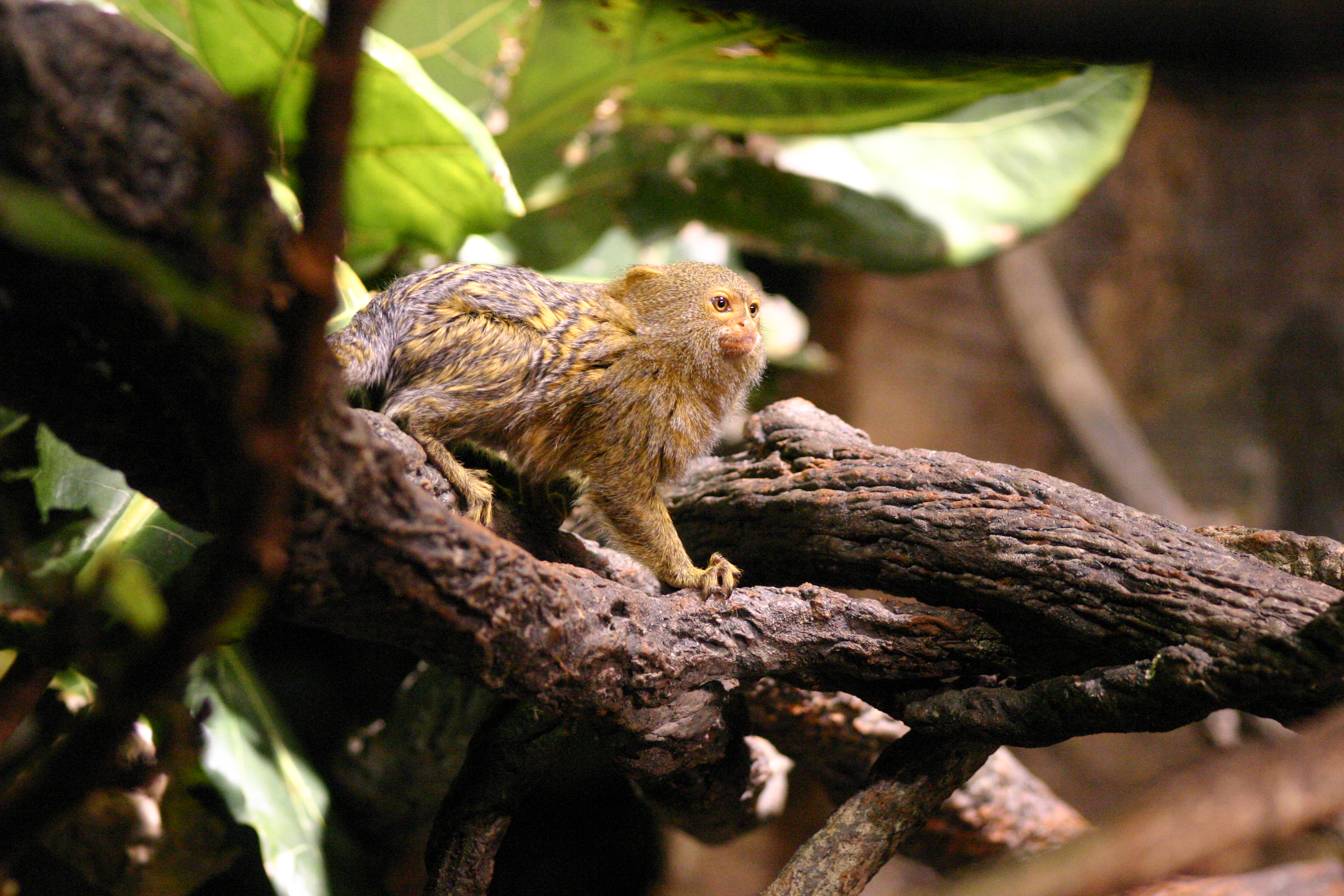
The pygmy marmoset is the world's smallest monkey.

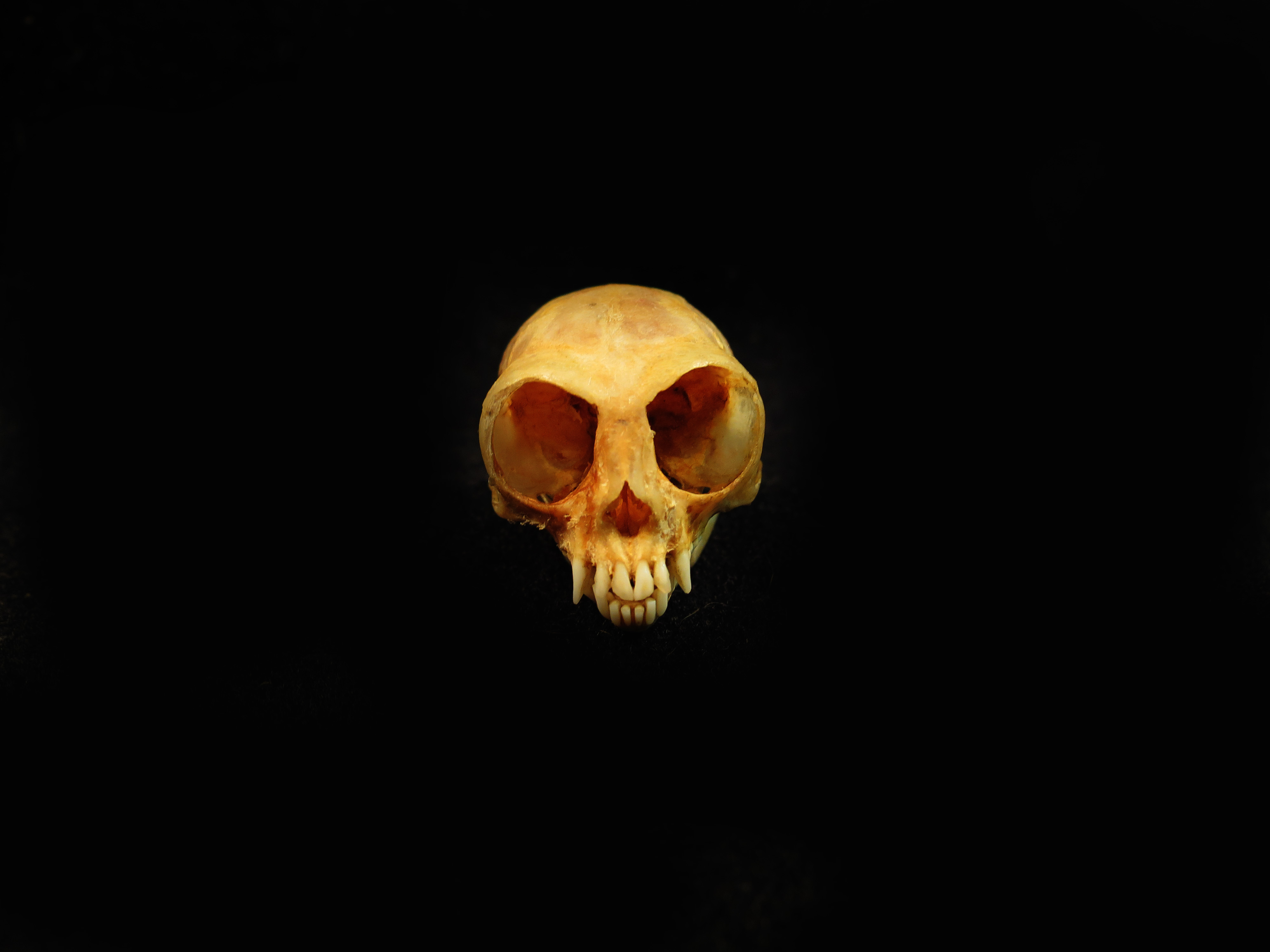
Skull of a pygmy marmoset

Pygmy marmosets are the smallest true monkeys, with a head-body length ranging from 117 to 152 mm (4.6 to 6.0 in) and a tail of 172 to 229 mm (6.8 to 9.0 in). The average adult body weight is just over 100 g (3.5 oz) with the only sexual dimorphism of females being a little heavier. The fur colour is a mixture of brownish-gold, grey, and black on its back and head and yellow, orange, and tawny on its underparts. Their tails have black rings and their faces have flecks of white on the cheeks and a white vertical line between the eyes. They have many adaptations for arboreal living, including the ability to rotate the head 180° and sharp, claw-like nails used to cling to branches and trunks of trees. The dental morphology is adapted to feeding on gum, with specialised incisors that are used to gouge trees and stimulate sap flow. The cecum is larger than usual to allow for the greater time gum needs to break down in the stomach. Pygmy marmosets walk on all four limbs and can leap up to 5 m (16 ft) between branches.

== Ecology ==
=== Geographic range and habitat ===
Pygmy marmosets can be found in much of the western Amazon Basin, in Brazil, Colombia, Ecuador, Peru, and Bolivia. The western pygmy marmoset, C. pygmaea, occurs in the state of Amazonas, Brazil, eastern Peru, southern Colombia, and north-eastern Ecuador. The eastern pygmy marmoset, C. niveiventris, is also found in Amazonas, but also in Acre, Brazil, eastern Peru, and northern Bolivia. The distribution of both species is often limited by rivers. They typically live in the understory of the mature evergreen forests and often near rivers. Population density is correlated with food-tree availability. They can be found between ground level and about 20 m (66 ft) into the trees, but generally do not enter the top of the canopy. They are often found in areas having standing water for more than three months of the year.

=== Diet ===
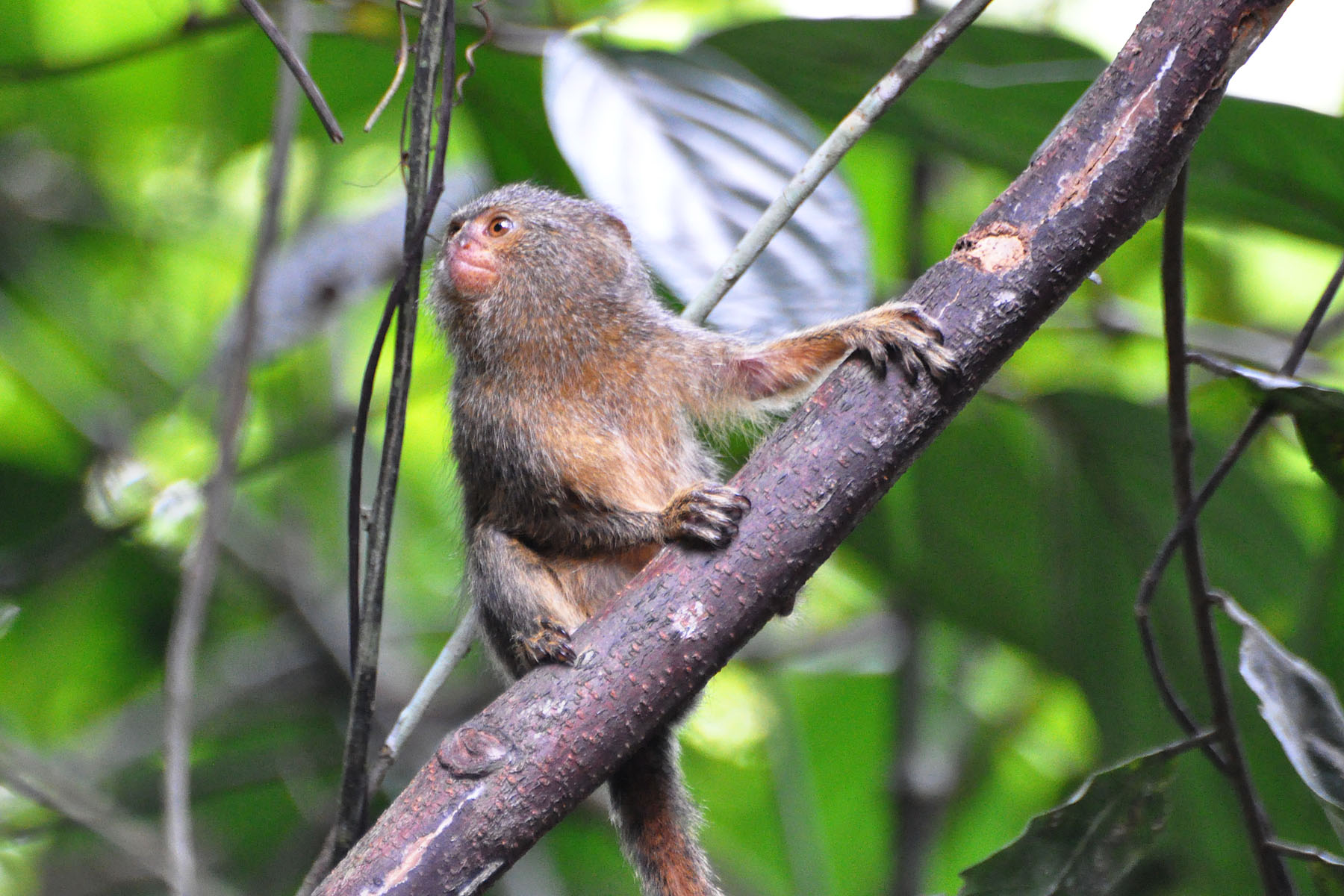
Specialised claws allow the pygmy marmoset to cling to trees while feeding.

These monkeys have a specialized diet of tree gum. They gnaw holes in the bark of appropriate trees and vines with their specialized dentition to elicit the production of gum. When the sap puddles up in the hole, they lap it up with their tongues. They also lie in wait for insects, especially butterflies, which are attracted to the sap holes. They supplement their diet with nectar and fruit. A group's home range is 0.1 to 0.4 ha (0.25 to 0.99 acres), and feeding is usually concentrated on one or two trees at a time. When those become depleted, a group moves to a new home range. Brown-mantled tamarins are generally sympatric with pygmy marmosets and often raid pygmy marmosets' gum holes.

Pygmy marmosets have adapted insect-like claws, known as tegulae, to engage in a high degree of claw-clinging behaviors associated with plant exudate exploitation. Claw-clinging is primarily used during feeding, but also during plant exudate foraging.

== Behaviour ==
Pygmy marmosets at the Rostock Zoo

A pygmy marmoset group, ranging from two to nine members, contains one or two adult males and one or two adult females, including a single breeding female and her offspring. Interbirth interval ranges from 149–746 days. In contrast to other callitrichines, no relationship exists between the number of adult males and the number of infants and offspring. A significant positive relationship exists, though, between the number of juveniles and the number of adult and subadult group members. Young marmosets typically remain in the group for two consecutive birth cycles. The pygmy marmoset uses special types of communication to give alerts and warning to its family members. These include chemical, vocal, and visual types of communication. It is believed to serve to promote group cohesion and avoidance of other family groups.

=== Social systems ===
Infant pygmy marmosets, along with their parents, twins, and other siblings, form co-operative care groups. Babbling, or vocalizing, by the infant marmoset is a key part of its relationships with its family members and is a major part of its development. As the infant develops, the babbling gradually changes to resemble and eventually become adult vocalization. Many similarities are seen between the development of vocalization in infant pygmy marmosets and speech in infant humans. Vocalizing gives the infant advantages, such as increased care, and allows the entire family to coordinate their activities without seeing each other.

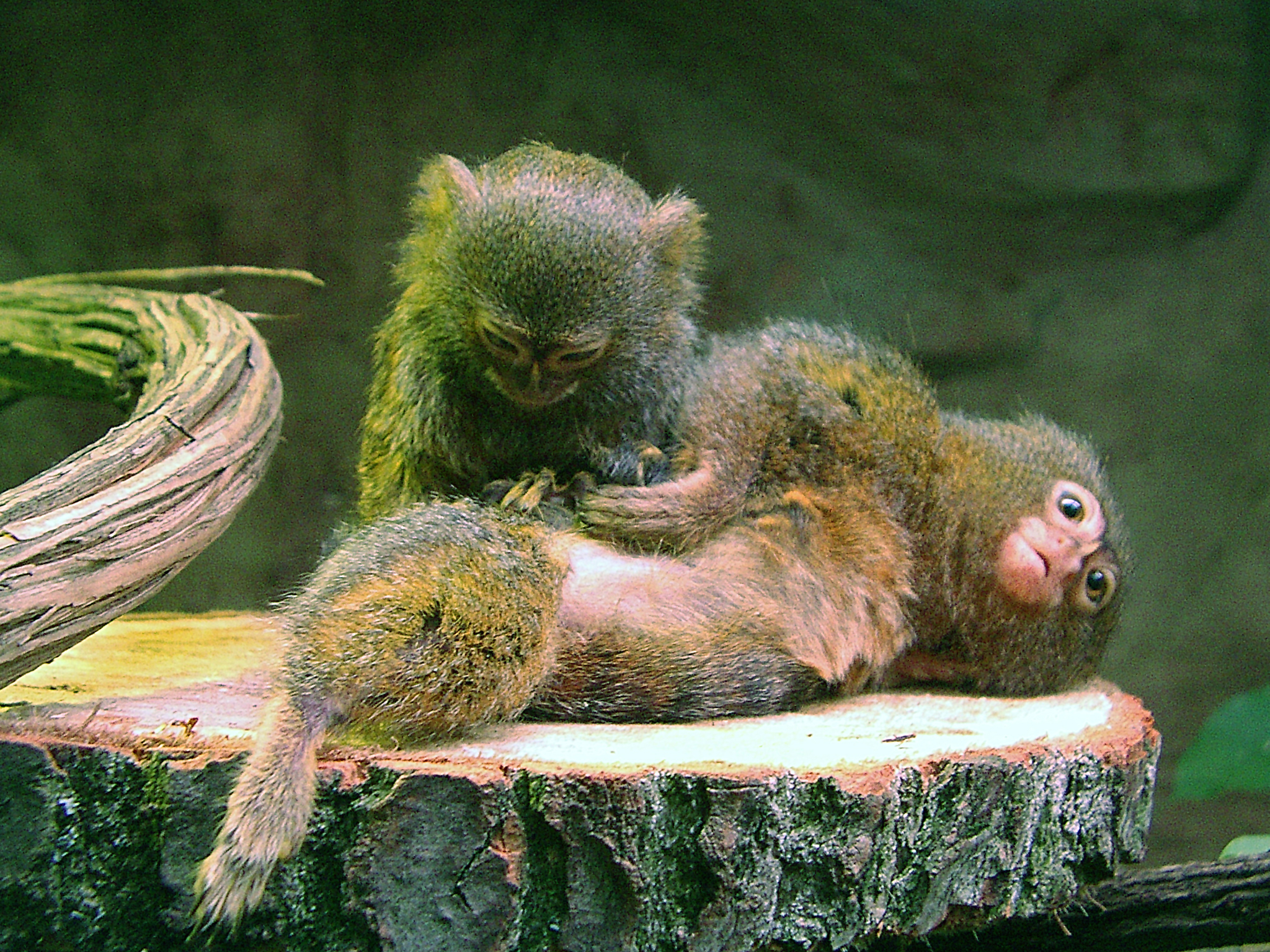
Pygmy marmosets live in groups of two to nine individuals.

Siblings also participate in infant care. Infant marmosets require the most attention, so having more family members participating in the care decreases the cost for any individual and also teaches parenting skills to the juvenile marmosets. Members of the group, usually female, may even put off their own reproduction through a temporary cessation of ovulation to care for the offspring of others in the group. The ideal number of caregivers for an infant marmoset has been shown to be around five individuals. Caregivers are responsible for finding food for the infants and helping the father watch for predators.

Pygmy marmosets are not seasonal breeders and usually give birth to twins once or twice a year. Single births, however, occur in 16% and triplet births occur in 8% of pregnancies. The pygmy marmoset is usually monogamous, though some variation happens within the species in terms of breeding systems. Polyandry also occurs, as male marmosets are responsible for carrying the infants on their backs. Having a second male to carry the offspring can be beneficial, as marmoset litters are often twins and this decreases the physiological cost to any particular male. The daily range of pygmy marmosets, however, is relatively small, which decreases the rate of polyandry.

Male and female pygmy marmosets show differences in foraging and feeding behavior, although male and female dominance and aggressive behavior vary within the species. Males have less time to search out food sources and forage due to the constraints of their infant-caring responsibilities and predator vigilance. Without an infant to carry, female pygmy marmosets have greater freedom to forage, giving them an apparent feeding priority, which may serve to compensate mothers for the energetic costs of carrying and lactating for two offspring at a time. Since breeding priority is also given to females without offspring, the argument is weakened. Instead, female feeding priority may have evolved through sexual selection. Females may choose mates that invest more time in infant care and predator vigilance. Such males have less time to look for food, allowing the female feeding priority.

=== Communication ===
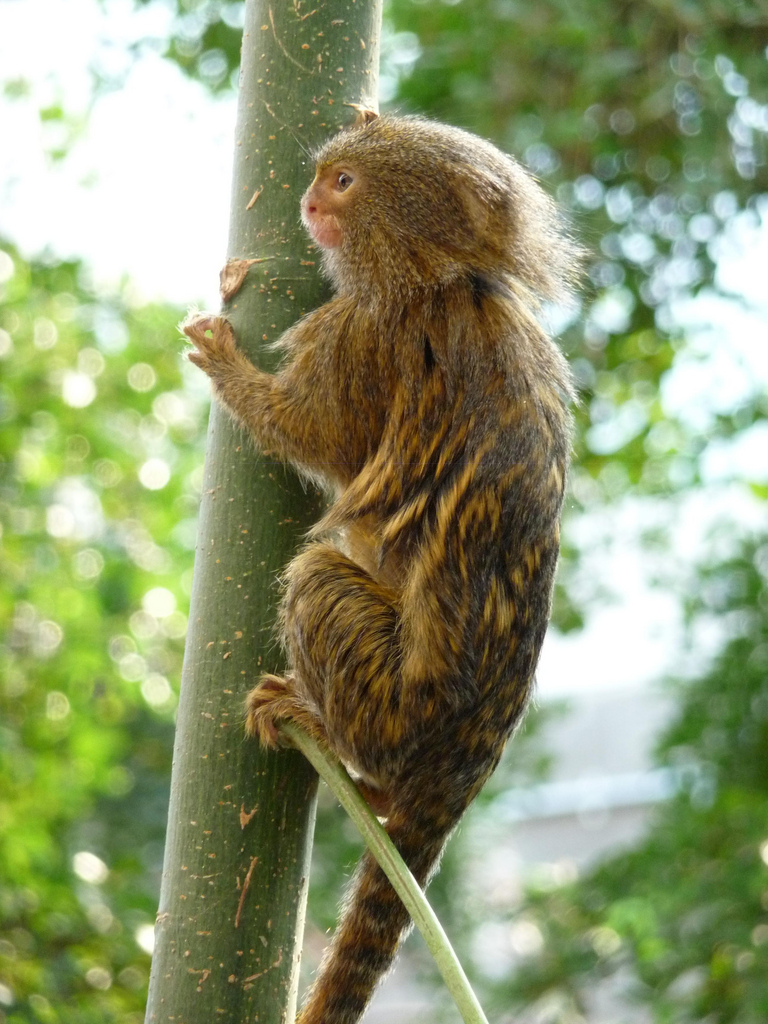
Groups use contact calls to stay together when foraging, feeding, and travelling.

Pygmy marmosets are well known for their communication abilities, including an intricate system of calls. The trill is used during feeding, foraging, and when travelling and the group is close together. The J-call is a series of fast notes repeated by the caller and is used at medium distances. Both calls are used as contact calls. The long call is used when the group is spread out over distances greater than 10 m or in response to a neighboring group. The pygmy marmoset uses the trill for short-distance communication, J-calls for intermediate distances, and long calls for long distances; these have respectively decreasing frequencies. They interpret these calls not only by type, but also through subtle sonic variance, by individual calling. Research based on audio playback tests shows that calls recorded from different individuals in captivity varied significantly in all seven auditory parameters analyzed for each type of call. Behavioral responses to trills were greatest when the caller was the dominant male of the group. Responses to J-calls were greatest when the caller was the monkey's mate or a same-sex monkey from outside the group. Varying responses to individual callers were only observed when the call was given spontaneously from another animal rather than being played back from a recording, with one exception. That exception was that male monkeys responded to playbacks of their own calls differently from those of other monkeys, when the call was played back from a familiar location. The pygmy marmoset is thought to react at first to the type of call that is being made and then adjusts its behavior slightly to react to the specific individual that is making the call. This allows the marmoset to react appropriately to all calls, but show some variation when the call gives extra information.

Environmental factors play a role in communication by affecting the frequency of the signal and how far the signal can travel and still be audible to communicate the desired message. Since pygmy marmosets are often found in the rain forest, plant life and the humid atmosphere add to the normal absorption and scattering of sound. Because low-frequency calls are affected less by the disturbances than high-frequency ones, they are used for communication across longer distances. The pygmy marmoset changes the characteristics of its calls when its social environment is changed. Adult marmosets show modifications in the structure of their calls, which mimic those of their group members. In addition to changes of existing calls, novel calls may be heard from marmosets after pairing.

Pygmy marmosets have other ways to communicate information about matters such as a female's ovulatory state. New World monkeys do not show genital swelling during ovulation as female Old World monkeys do. Instead, a lack of female aggression towards males can serve as a signal of ovulation. Scent glands on her chest, anus, and genitals are also rubbed on surfaces, which leave chemical signals about the reproductive state of the female. Pygmy marmosets also perform visual displays such as strutting, back-arching, and piloerection when they feel threatened or to show dominance.

== Conservation ==
Both species of pygmy marmosets are listed as vulnerable on the IUCN Red List of Threatened Species. They are threatened by habitat loss in some areas of their range, and by the pet trade in others (i.e. Ecuador). Interaction between humans and pygmy marmosets is associated with a number of behavioral changes in the animal, including social play and vocalization, both of which are important to communication between animals in the species. Particularly in areas of heavy tourism, pygmy marmosets have a tendency to be less noisy, less aggressive, and less playful with other individuals. They are also pushed into higher strata of the rainforest than they would normally prefer. Tourism in areas native to the pygmy marmoset is also correlated with increased capture of the animal. Due to its small size and relatively docile nature, captured pygmy marmosets are often found in exotic pet trades. Capture causes even more behavioral variations, including a decrease in both the number and the sound level of vocalizations. Pygmy marmosets can also be found at local zoos, where they exist in groups.

== As pets ==
Known in the pet trade as finger monkeys, their value is associated with their being the smallest primate in the world. Listed as Vulnerable to extinction, they are rare to find in the market for purchase. Prices range from $1,000 to $4,000. Generally, a pygmy marmoset's lifespan is 15 to 20 years; they are known to have a shorter life in the wild mainly because they fall out of trees.

Another expense for these creatures as pets is the necessary essentials to maintain them. Creating an environment similar to where they are from is important. For food, these creatures as pets are often fed fruits, insects, and smaller lizards. As pets, a baby pygmy marmoset needs to be fed every two hours for at least two weeks. Understanding their natural diet is also important because it helps maintain their good health from the necessary protein, calcium, and other nutrients they need to survive.

In the United States, each state has different regulations regarding ownership of pet monkeys. Another factor that needs to be considered is that a regular veterinarian might not be able to help provide medical evaluations or care; one would need to seek out a veterinarian with a primate specialization. In South America, either importing or exporting these creatures is illegal. Understanding the laws within those countries is important when considering owning or taking care of a pygmy marmoset. Many people do not agree that pygmy marmosets should be pets. The argument in favor of keeping them in captivity is usually that they have a longer lifespan when they are in good care from a human. However, the UK RSPCA says they should "not be considered as pets in the accepted sense of the word. They are wild, undomesticated animals that cannot be house trained or fully tamed".

== In popular culture ==
- Fingerlings, a toy line produced by WowWee, is based on pygmy marmosets.
