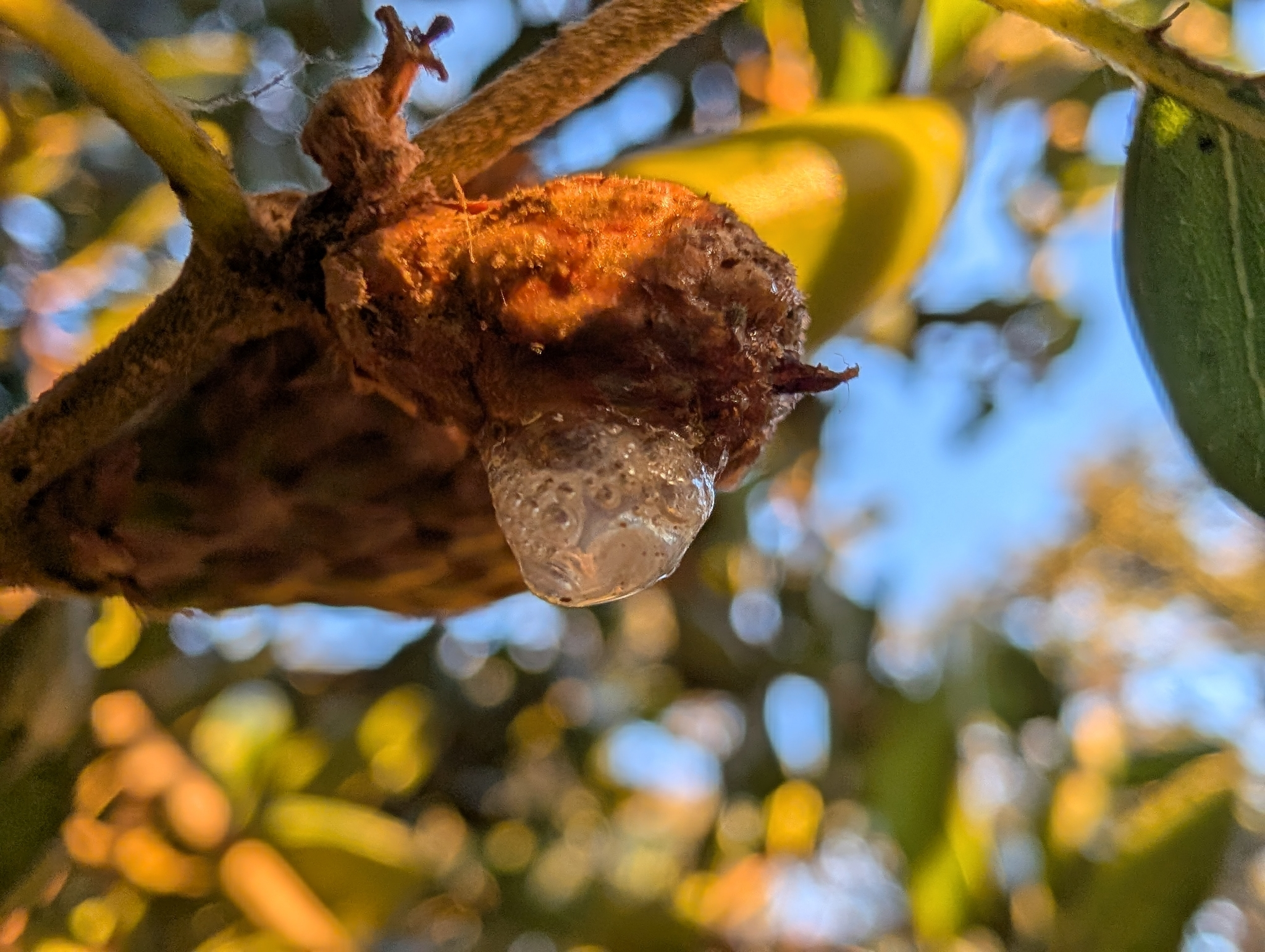
- Gummosis from the acorn cap of coast live oak due to Lonsdalea quercina infection

Scientific classification
- Domain: Bacteria
- Kingdom: Pseudomonadati
- Phylum: Pseudomonadota
- Class: Gammaproteobacteria
- Order: Enterobacterales
- Family: Pectobacteriaceae
- Genus: Lonsdalea
- Species: L. quercina

Binomial name
- Lonsdalea quercina Brady et al., 2012

Synonyms
- Erwinia quercina Hildebrand and Schroth 1967; Brenneria quercina (Hildebrand and Schroth 1967) Hauben et al. 1999

= Lonsdalea quercina =

Disease-causing Gram-negative bacillus

Lonsdalea quercina is a Gram-negative bacillus in the family Pectobacteriaceae.

== Symptoms ==
Lonsdalea quercina causes drippy blight disease in the live oak species Quercus agrifolia and Quercus wislizenii in California, as well as Quercus gambelii, Quercus rubra, Quercus shumardii, and Quercus palustris in Colorado. When the bacteria infect the acorn tissue, the acorn caps will ooze a clear or amber colored sap due to gummosis, and may continue to do so even after the nut has dropped. The infected oaks may also exhibit leaf scorch and premature leaf drop, followed by the development of cankers on the branches.

== Taxonomy ==
The species was first described in 1967 as Erwinia quercina by Hildebrand & Schroth. In 1999, Hauben et al. moved E. quercina to a new genus Brenneria. Then in 2012, Brady et al. established Lonsdalea quercina as the type species for the new genus Lonsdalea based on DNA analysis.

== Etymology ==
The genus Lonsdalea was named for Dr. David Lonsdale for his work on the biology and pathology of trees. The specific epithet quercina refers to the genus of oak trees this bacterium infects.
