= Tierpark station =

Tierpark station may refer to:

- Tierpark station (Berlin U-Bahn)
- Dortmund Tierpark station
- Hagenbecks Tierpark station
