= Dortmund Tierpark station =

Railway station in Germany

Dortmund Tierpark
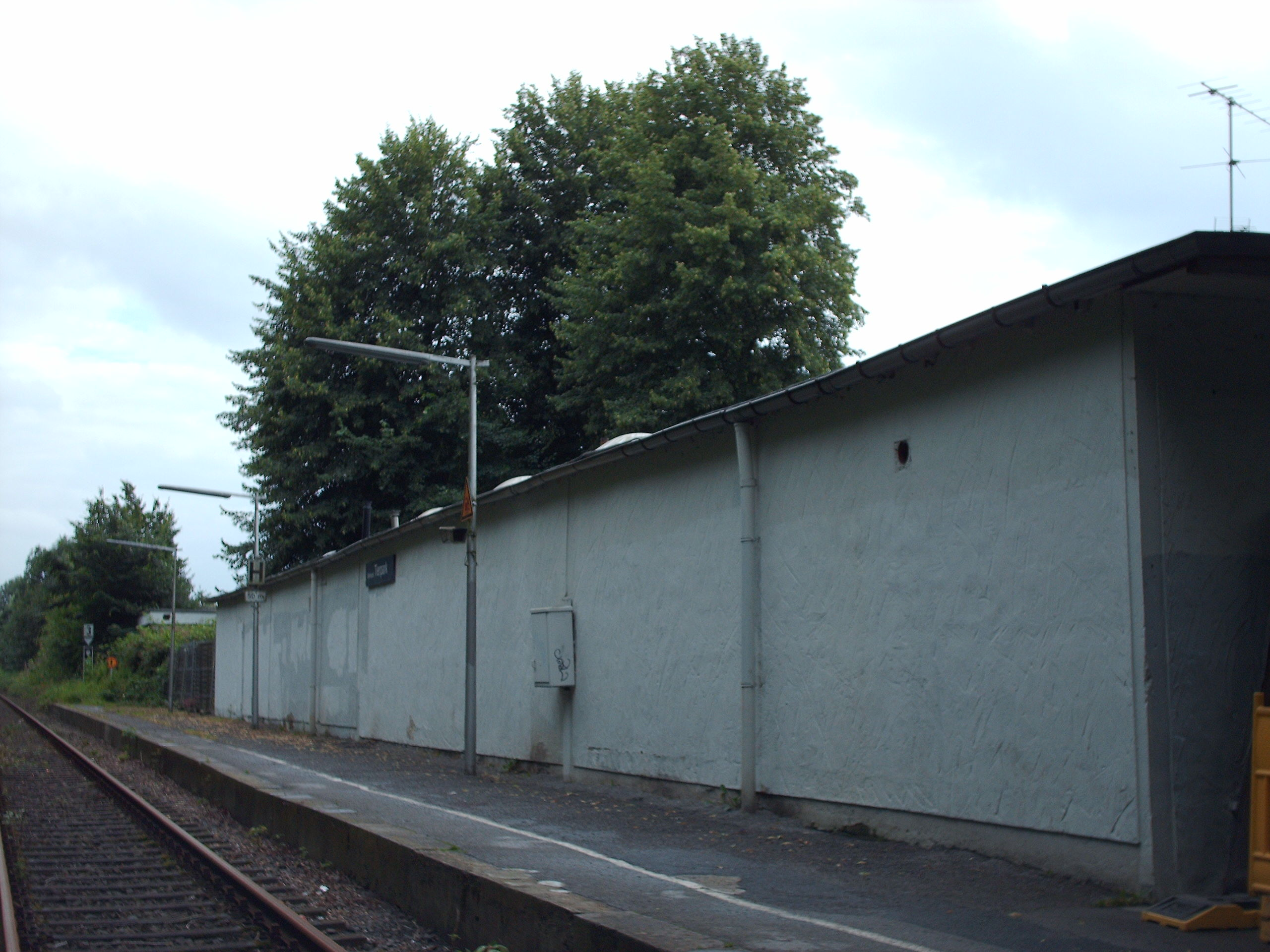

General information
- Location: Am Bahnhof Tierpark; 44225 Dortmund; NRW, Germany
- Coordinates: 51°28′41″N 7°27′43″E
- Owner: DB Netz
- Operator: DB Station&Service
- Line: Düsseldorf-Derendorf–Dortmund Süd
- Platforms: 1 side platform
- Tracks: 1
- Train operators: DB Regio NRW

Construction
- Accessible: Yes

Other information
- Station code: 1294
- DS100 code: EDTP
- IBNR: 8001521
- Category: 6
- Fare zone: VRR: 372
- Website: www.bahnhof.de

Services
Preceding station	DB Regio NRW	Following station
Dortmund Signal Iduna Park towards Dortmund Hbf	RB 52	Dortmund-Kirchhörde towards Lüdenscheid
Location
- Location within North Rhine-Westphalia

Dortmund Tierpark station is a railway station in the Brünninghausen district of the town of Dortmund, located in North Rhine-Westphalia, Germany.

The station Dortmund Tierpark is located on the Düsseldorf-Derendorf–Dortmund Süd railway built by the Rhenish Railway Company (German: Rheinische Eisenbahn-Gesellschaft, RhE) and now operated by Deutsche Bahn. The railroad line is single-track at the level of the station, for which reason the station has only one platform. The nearby former Tierpark and today's Dortmund Zoo gives the station its name. Until its renaming in 1959/1960, the station was officially named "Brünninghausen".

The station is located on the street Am Bahnhof Tierpark, which translates to at the Tierpark station. In the immediate vicinity are the bus stops Brünninghausen and Mergelteichstr./Zoo, which offer transfers to the bus lines of Dortmunder Stadtwerke. The Rombergpark Botanical Garden is located east of the tracks and can be reached via an underpass.

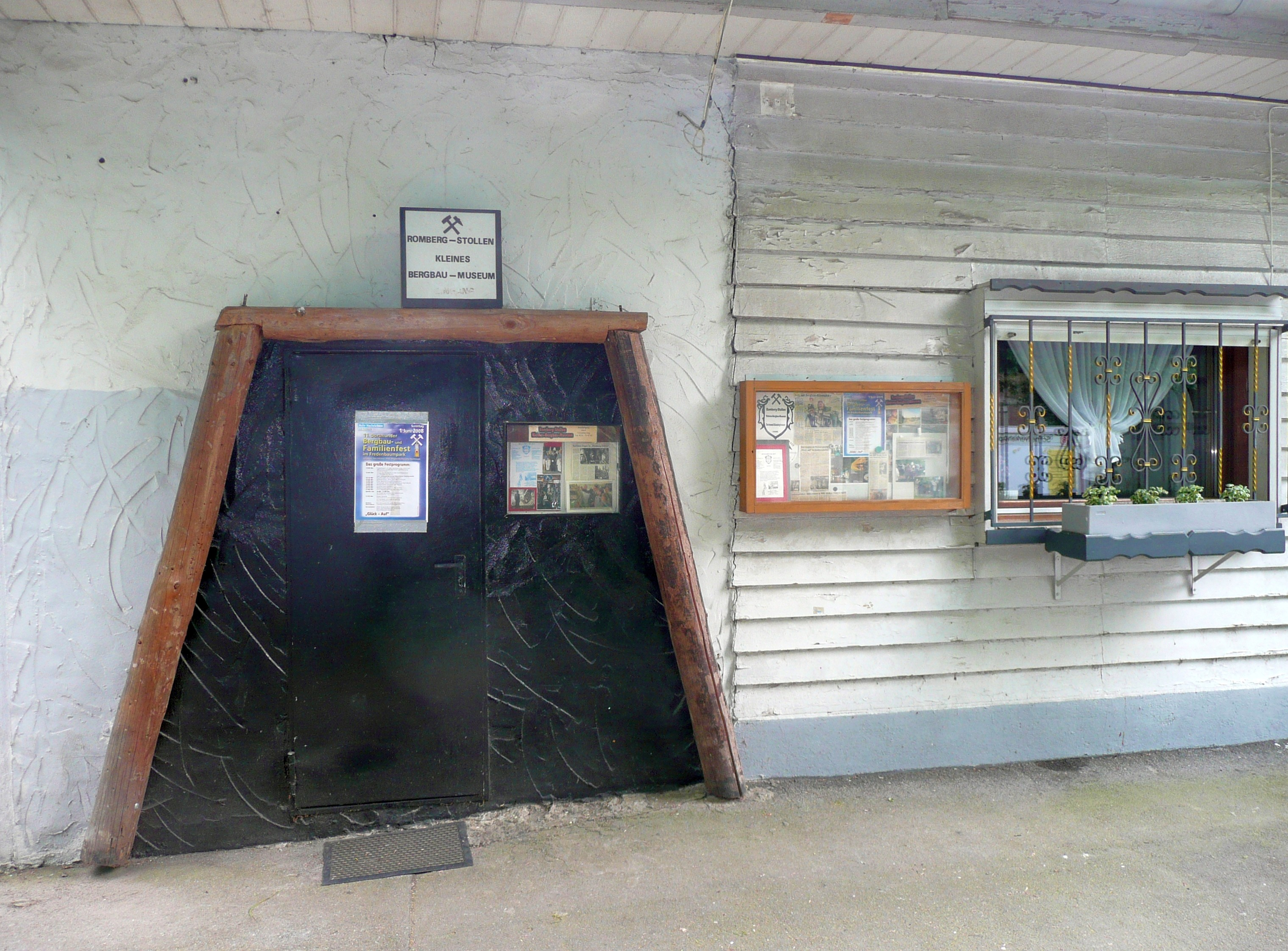
The former mining museum "Romberg-Stollen" located in the Dortmund Tierpark station building

== Museum "Romberg-Stollen" ==
The former station building housed the private mining museum "Romberg-Stollen", which displayed exhibits from the history of coal mining, especially from the former Glückaufsegen colliery. As of today (May 2021), the museum is closed.

== Rail services ==
Line	Name	Route
RB 52	Volmetalbahn	Dortmund – Dortmund Tierpark – Hagen – Lüdenscheid
