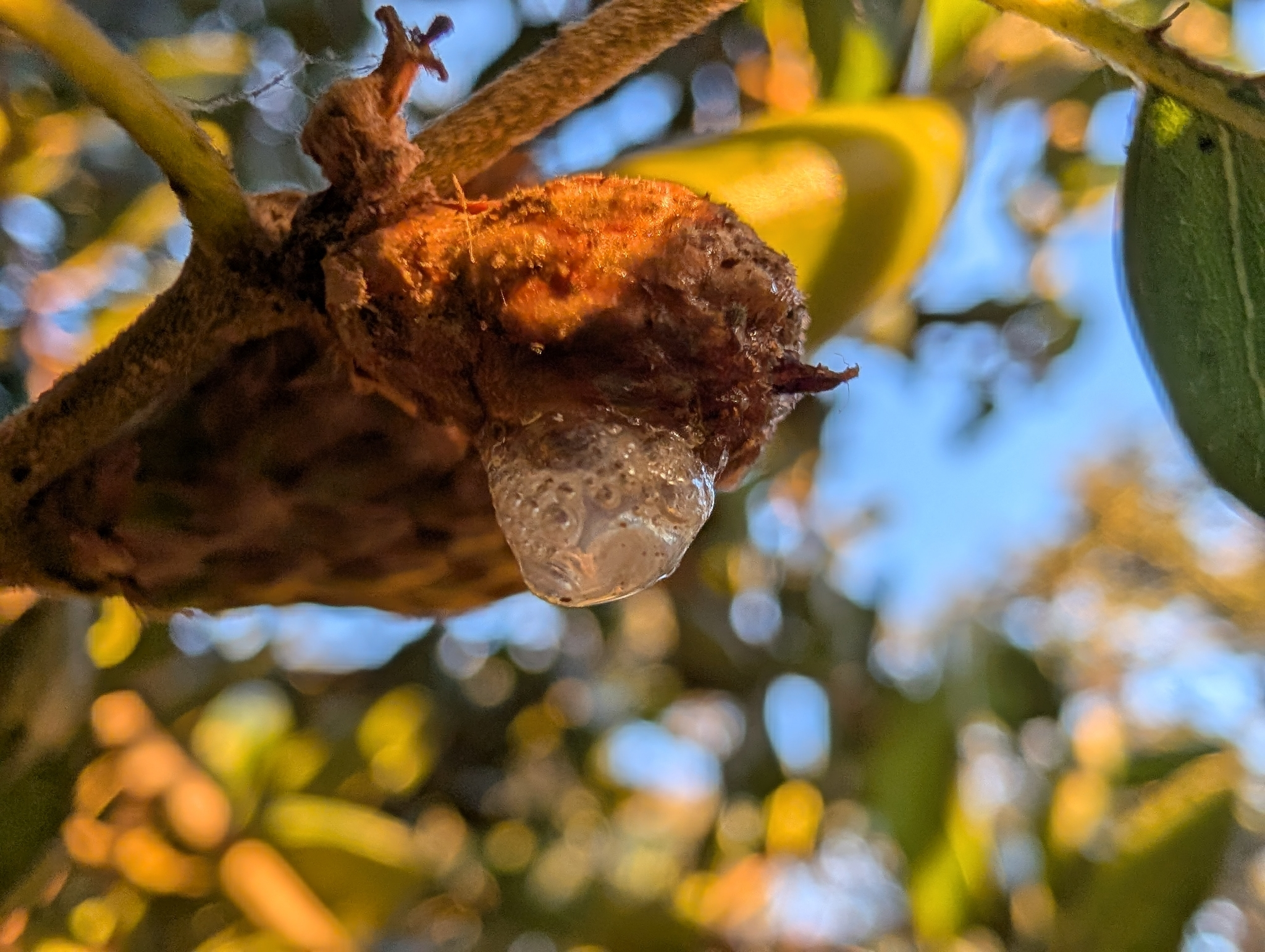
- Gummosis from the acorn cap of coast live oak due to Lonsdalea quercina infection

Scientific classification
- Domain: Bacteria
- Kingdom: Pseudomonadati
- Phylum: Pseudomonadota
- Class: Gammaproteobacteria
- Order: Enterobacterales
- Family: Pectobacteriaceae
- Genus: Lonsdalea; Brady et al., 2012

Type species
- Lonsdalea quercina (Hildebrand and Schroth 1967) Brady et al. 2012

Species
- Lonsdalea britannica (Brady et al. 2012) Li et al. 2017; Lonsdalea iberica (Brady et al. 2012) Li et al. 2017; Lonsdalea populi (Tóth et al. 2013) Li et al. 2017; Lonsdalea quercina (Hildebrand and Schroth 1967) Brady et al. 2012

= Lonsdalea =

Genus of bacteria

Lonsdalea is a genus of the family Pectobacteriaceae. It was established in 2012 by Brady et al. The type species, Lonsdalea quercina, was first described in 1967 by Hildebrand & Schroth as the reason for drippy nut disease in live oaks. There are currently four species placed under Lonsdalea:

- Lonsdalea britannica (Brady et al. 2012) Li et al. 2017
- Lonsdalea iberica (Brady et al. 2012) Li et al. 2017
- Lonsdalea populi (Tóth et al. 2013) Li et al. 2017
- Lonsdalea quercina (Hildebrand and Schroth 1967) Brady et al. 2012

== Etymology ==
The genus was named for Dr. David Lonsdale for his work on the biology and pathology of trees.
