= Dortmund Zoo =

Zoo in Dortmund, Germany

Zoo Dortmund
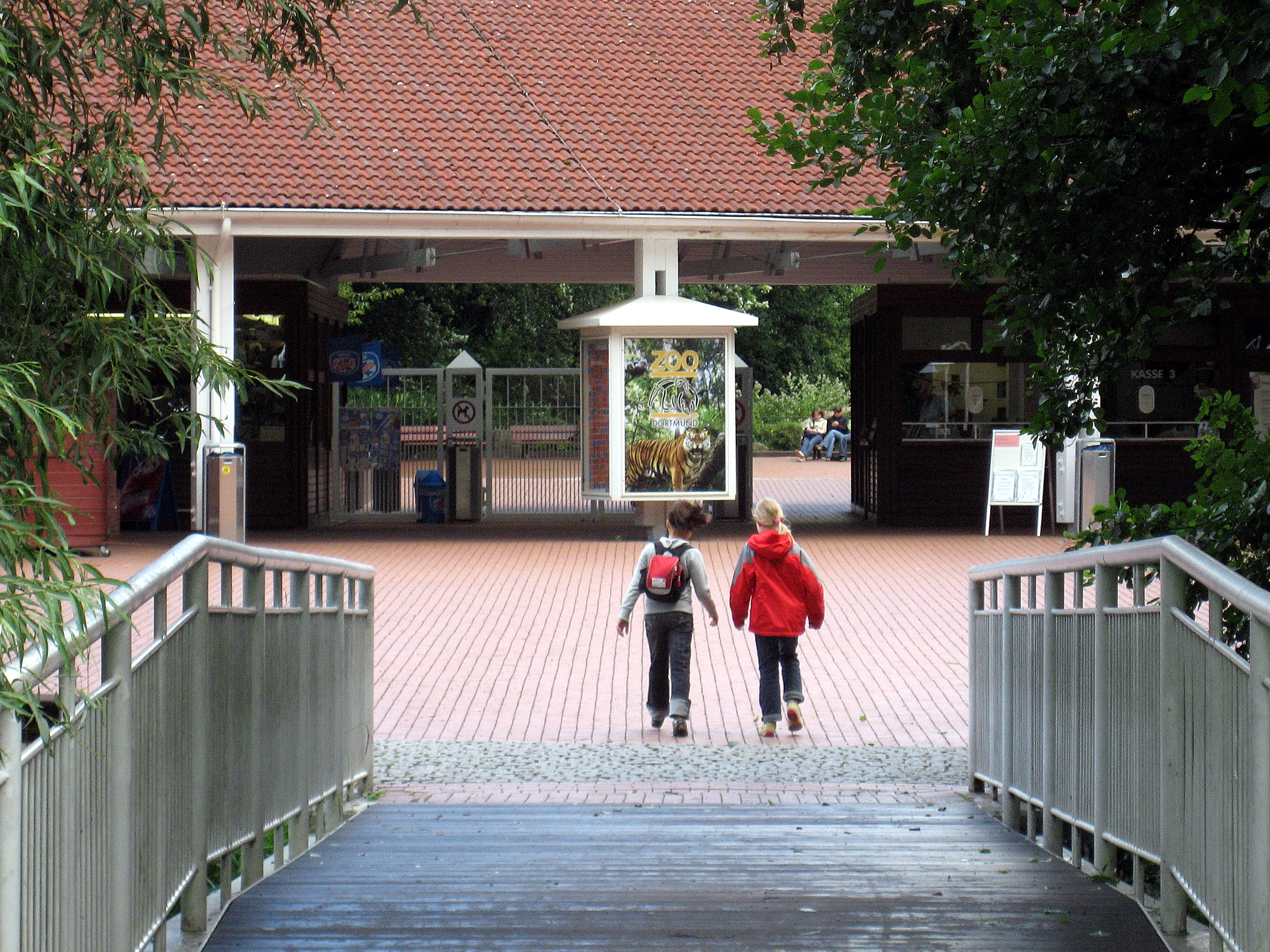
- Zoo Dortmund Entrance
- Interactive map of Zoo Dortmund
- 51.472°N 7.470°E
- Date opened: May 24, 1953
- Location: Dortmund, Germany
- Land area: 28 hectares (69 acres)
- No. of animals: ~1500
- No. of species: ~230

The Dortmund Zoo is the zoological garden of Dortmund, Germany. It is specialized in the keeping and breeding of South American species and is leading in the breeding of the giant anteater, the tamandua and the giant otter. The zoo is situated in the south of the city between the boroughs of Hacheney and Brünninghausen.

== Animals ==
- Amur leopard
- Angola giraffe
- Bat-eared fox
- Capybara
- Common squirrel monkey
- Coypu
- Emperor tamarin
- Himalayan tahr
- Indian peafowl
- Jaguar
- Lesser Panda
- Maned wolf
- Meerkat
- Oncilla
- Patagonian mara
- Roe deer
- Siamang
- Sumatran orangutan
- Two-toed sloth
- Yellow mongoose
- Western pygmy marmoset
- White rhinoceros
- Woylie

== Gallery ==
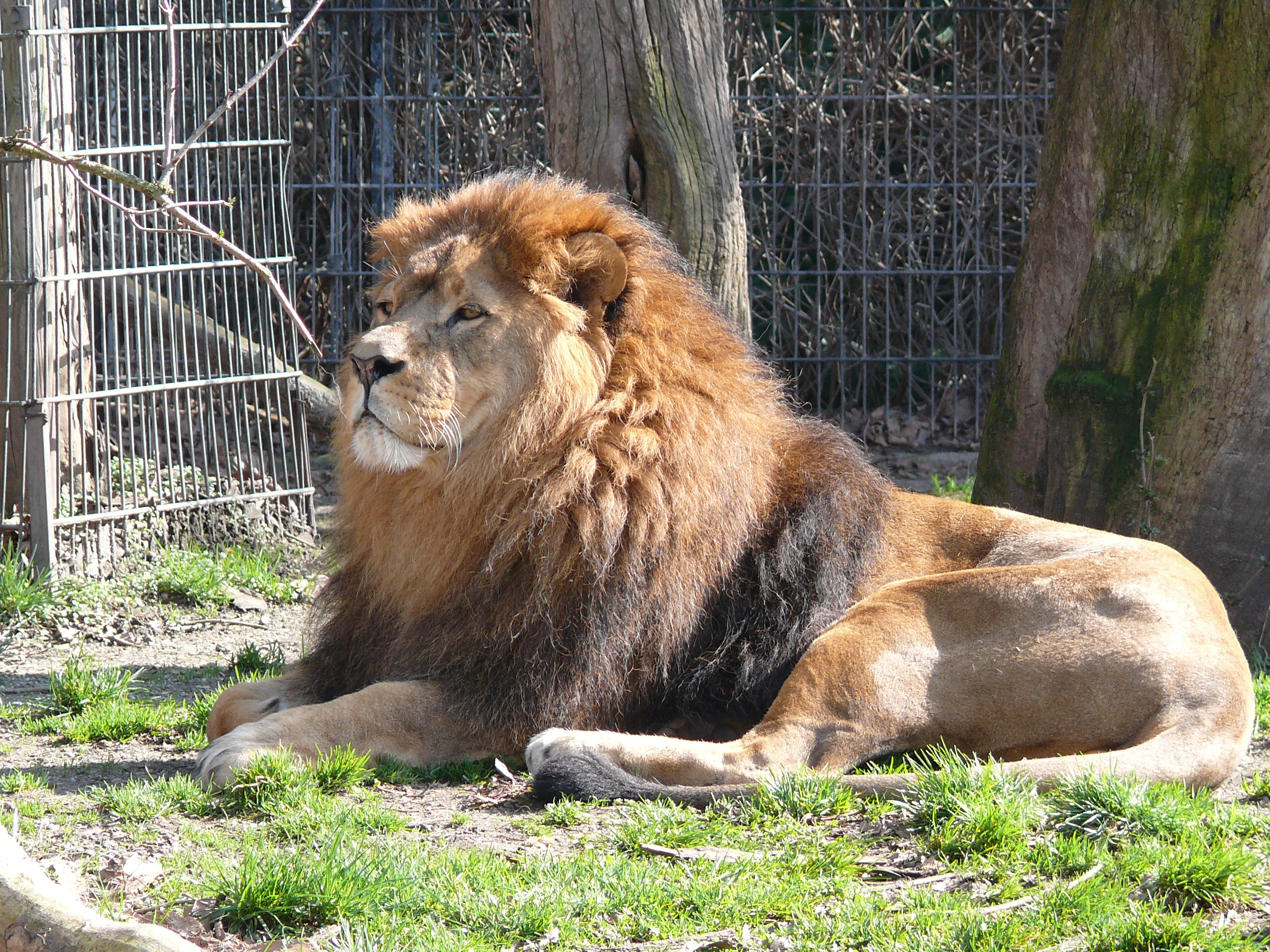
Lukas the lion

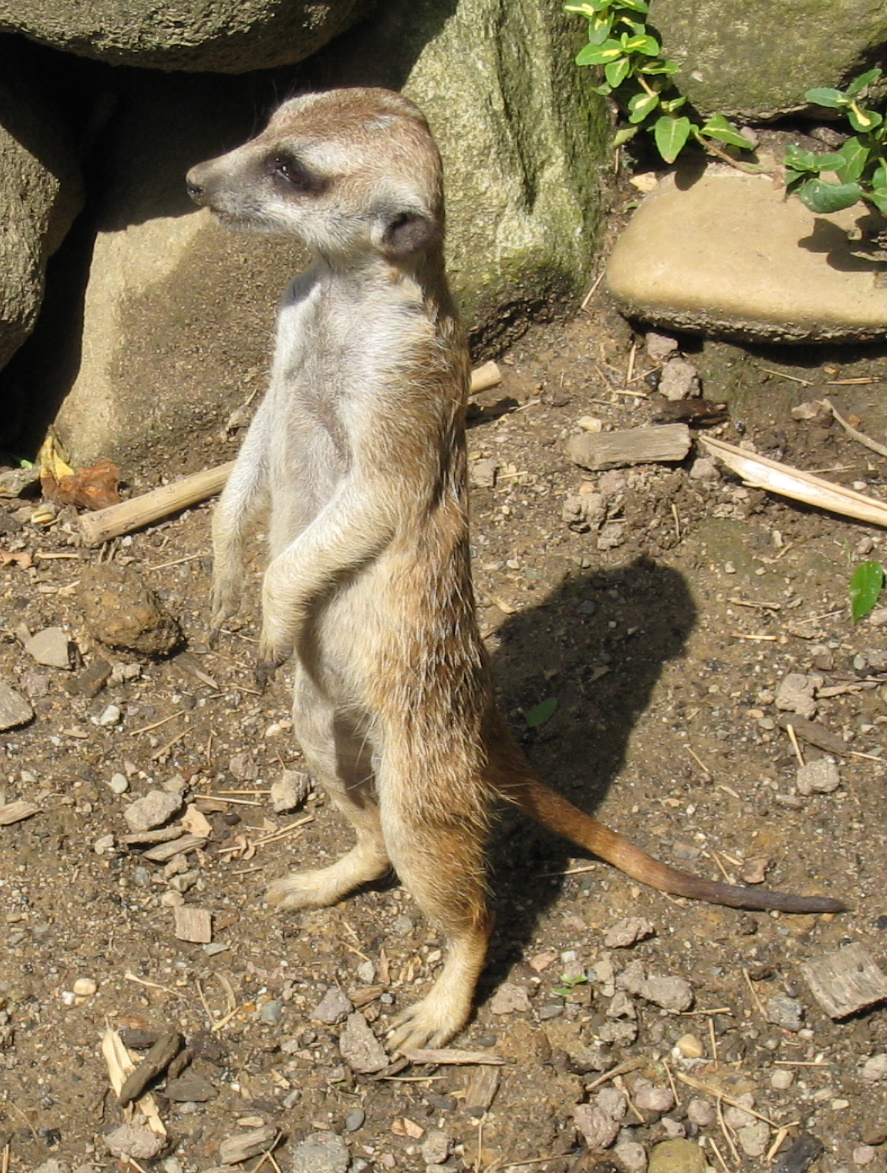
Meerkat at the Zoo Dortmund

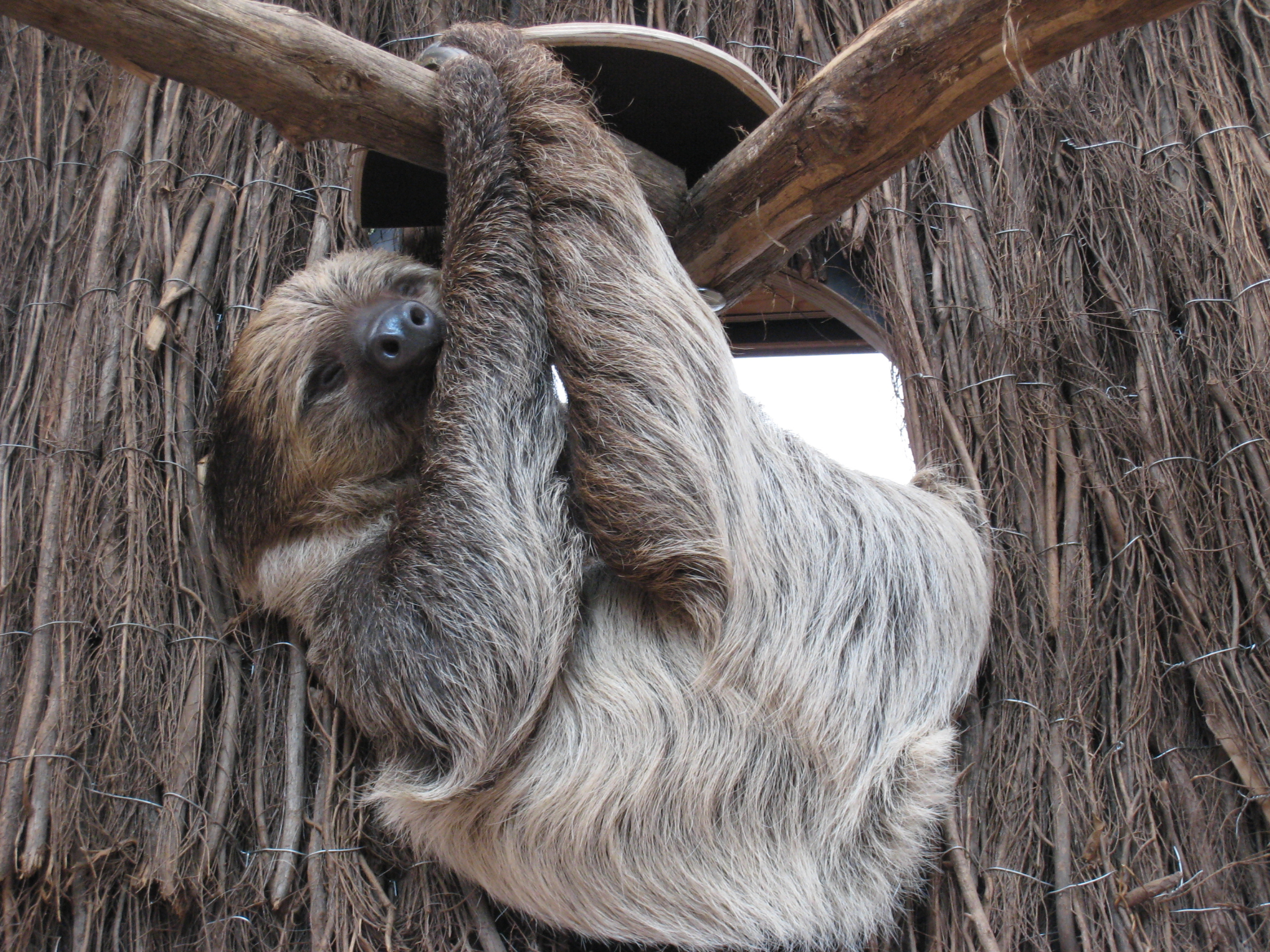
Two-toed sloth at the Dortmund Zoo

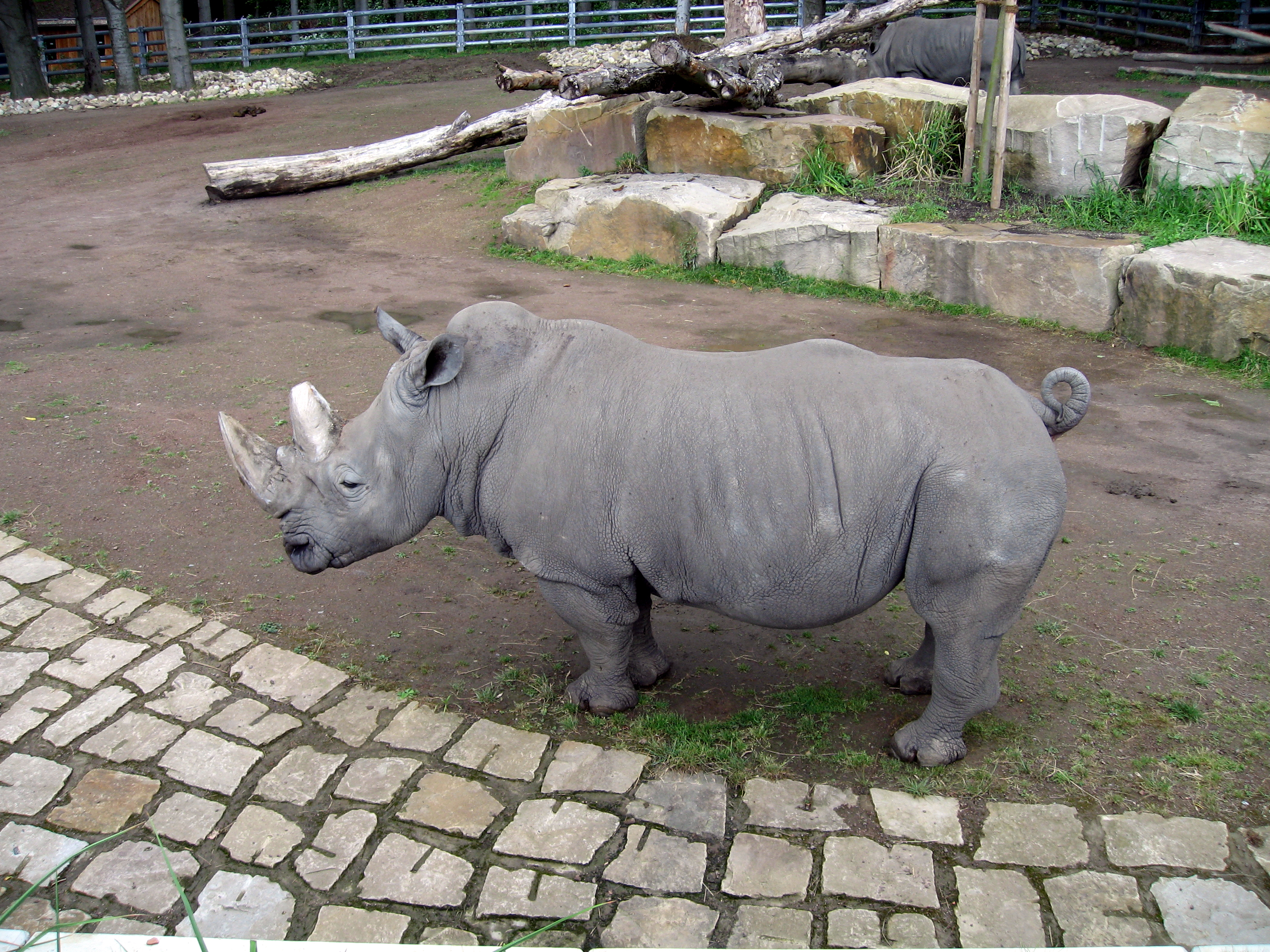
White rhinoceros at the Dortmund Zoo

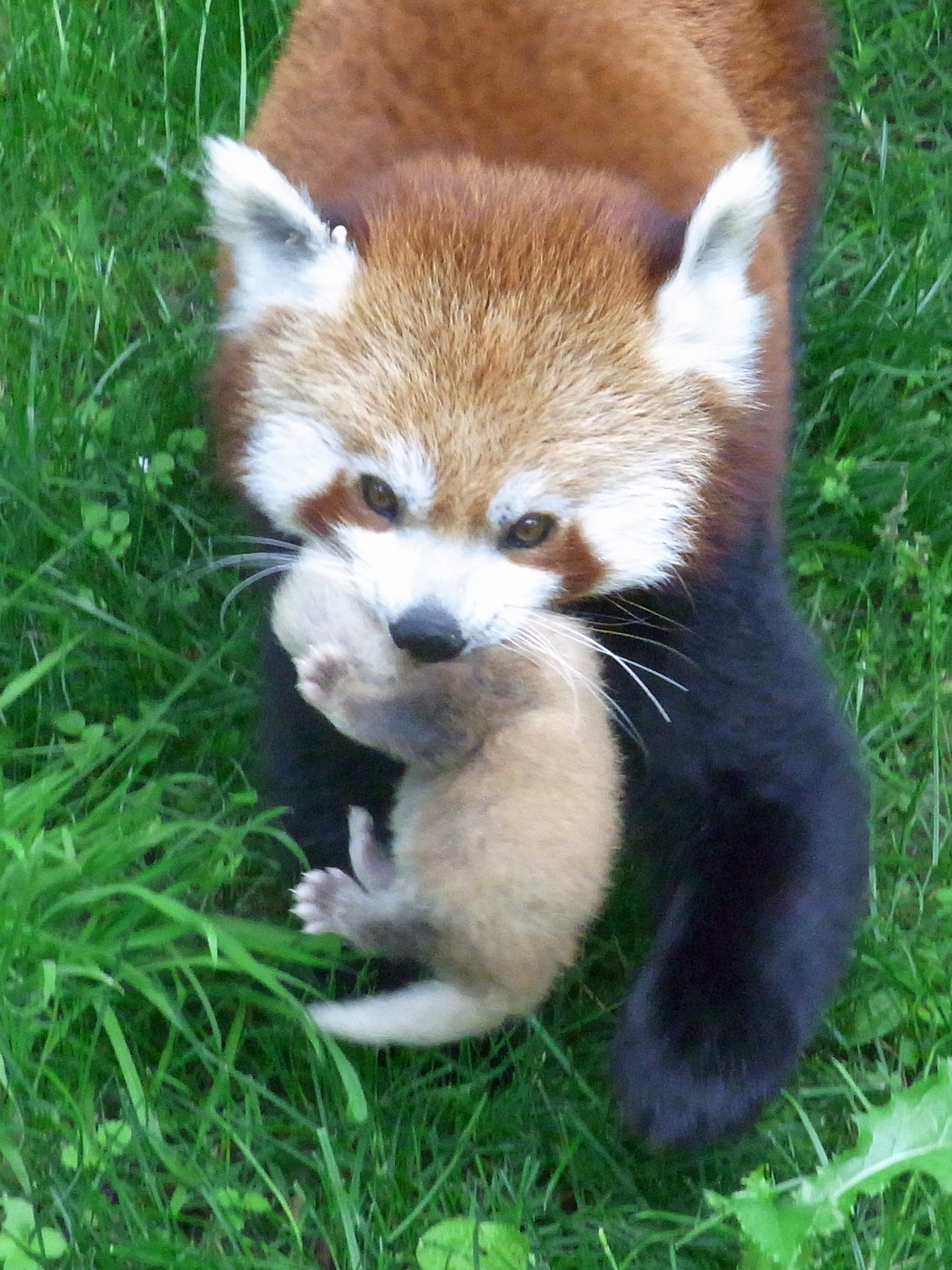
Red panda with baby at the Dortmund Zoo

== See also ==
- List of zoos in Germany
