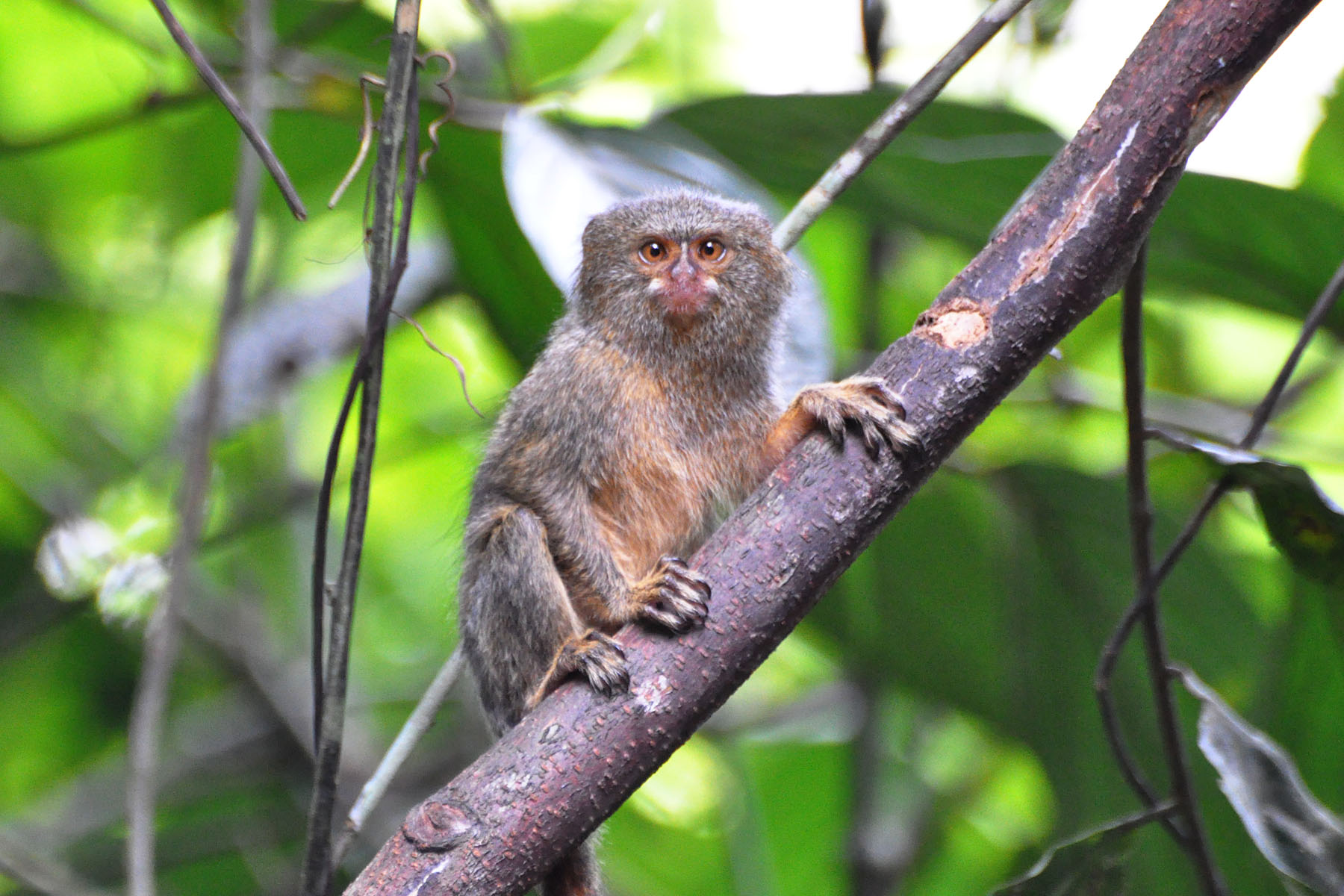
- Western pygmy marmoset in the Amazon, Ecuador

Conservation status
- Vulnerable (IUCN 3.1)

Scientific classification
- Kingdom: Animalia
- Phylum: Chordata
- Class: Mammalia
- Infraclass: Placentalia
- Order: Primates
- Family: Callitrichidae
- Genus: Cebuella
- Species: C. pygmaea

Binomial name
- Cebuella pygmaea (Spix, 1823)

= Western pygmy marmoset =

Species of New World monkey

The western pygmy marmoset (Cebuella pygmaea) is a marmoset species, a very small New World monkey found in the northwestern Amazon rainforest in Brazil, Colombia, Ecuador, and Peru. It was formerly regarded as conspecific with the similar eastern pygmy marmoset, which has whitish underparts. Although the western pygmy marmoset occurs further west than the eastern pygmy marmoset, the primary separators of their ranges are the Amazon River (Solimões River) and Marañón River, with the western occurring to the north of them and the eastern to the south.

== Physical description ==
The western pygmy marmoset is the world's smallest monkey. Pygmy marmosets have only a slight degree of sexual dimorphism; in the wild the average male weighs 110 g (3.9 oz), which is slightly smaller than the average female at 122 g (4.3 oz). Fully grown western pygmy marmosets have an average body length of 13 cm (5.1 in), and a tail marked with black rings that is on average longer than their bodies at 20 cm (7.9 in). They have fluffy "brownish-gold fur with black ticking on their shoulders, backs, and heads, while their ventral fur is light yellow to white". There are very little visible physical differences between the two species in the Cebuella genus, with only a slight distinction in pelage colour. Similar to other New World monkey species, the Western pygmy marmoset has long claw-like nails on all of their digits, which are mainly used for climbing and foraging. Their skull is similar to that of the Callithrix genus, possibly due to their tree-gouging behavior and their appendicular skeleton has been shaped by the long periods of clinging, climbing, and their "upside down and under branch locomotion". While pygmy marmosets leap the farthest relative to the length of their bodies, they are not very efficient in their leaps, and thus rarely do.

== Distribution ==
Western pygmy marmosets are native to South America, occupying a range which intersects borders with Bolivia, Brazil, Colombia, Ecuador and Peru. In Brazil, they can be found in the upper Amazon basin, north of Solimões River, west of the Japurá River and south of the Río Caquetá in Colombia. There is a small subpopulation which is isolated west of the Rio Huallaga in northern Peru, which are of concern to researchers, as anthropogenic stresses are threatening this small population. They prefer a lowland habitat within tropical forests that are flooded for more than three months per year. Thus, their habitats are in tropical climates within swamps or rainforests.

== Behaviour ==
=== Diet ===
The western pygmy marmoset is an exudativore-insectivore, thus its diet comes mainly from the exudates (fluids) from trees, such as tree sap, gum, resin, and latex from lianas and trees. Through evolution of feeding on gum and sap from trees, the western pygmy marmoset developed dental adaptations that its ancestors did not have. These dental adaptations allow it to actively stimulate the fluids from the trees, as it gouges holes in the bark. It can also be found, on occasion, eating arthropods (such as insects, particularly grasshoppers, and spiders), small lizards, fruits, and flowers.

=== Breeding ===
The pygmy marmosets frequently have fraternal twins. When born, their infants are smaller than expected compared to their gestation length. This is probably due to their slow growth rate when in utero.

Studies have shown that Cebuella pygmaea is potentially able to prevent reproduction in their population through hormonal suppression. If a single dominant female marmoset does not wish for her subordinate group members to reproduce, she can produce pheromonal signals which suppress hormones (LH secretion) which leads to ovulatory failure. However, this does not always work. If a subordinate female group member succeeds at breeding, the dominant female might resort to killing the offspring.

=== Vocalizations ===
Due to the natural habitat in the dense Amazonian River basin, the western pygmy marmoset must rely on vocal communication. This marmoset uses trills when it is at close distance, up to 9 m (30 ft), from one another and they use J calls when they are more than 20 m (66 ft) apart. The western pygmy marmoset's "habitat acoustics have shaped the physical structure of the signals used for short and long-range communication". Long-range calls are the only ones that are distinctively heard compared to the trills and J calls, as they produce a lower frequency call at long distances. By using these different calling methods, the pygmy marmoset has developed a way of communicating distances to determine individual locations.

Interestingly, the western pygmy marmoset has been observed to change "the structure of their trill vocalizations in response to pairing with a new mate". Prior to mating, marmosets would display unique trill vocalizations, and after six weeks of pairing, their trills become more homogenous. These same studies also show that these vocal structure changes remained stable three years after pairing.

== Threats and conservation ==
As of 2015, the western pygmy marmoset (Cebuella pygmaea) has been listed by the IUCN as vulnerable based on the A4cd criteria. Based on their assessments, the population has declined more than 30% since 2009. According to the IUCN, this population decline can be attributed mainly to anthropogenic threats including deforestation, agriculture, mining and settlements. While the distribution area of the western pygmy marmoset is physically large, their niche diet results in a significantly smaller suitable habitat within the area they inhabit. Furthermore, this species has been impacted by the exotic pet trade, specifically in areas of their range which coincide with Ecuador and Peru. Hunting has also traditionally been a stressor to the pygmy marmoset populations, as live capture is a common practice of children and adults of many indigenous communities, as well as being eaten and killed for target practice.

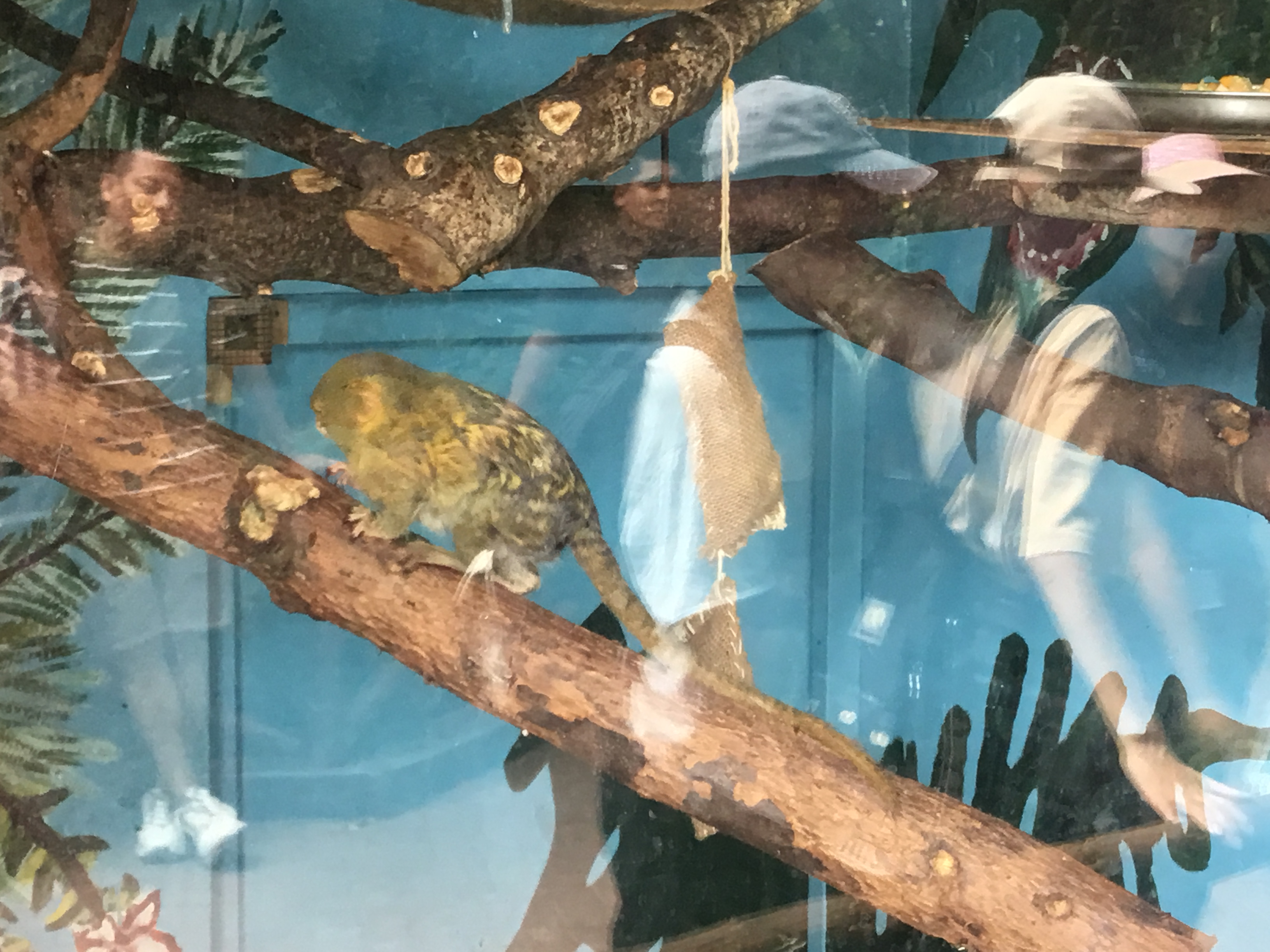
A Western Pygmy in the Parque de las Leyendas zoo

While the western pygmy marmoset is only listed by the IUCN as vulnerable and not yet endangered, many scholars believe that more is needed to protect these animals. Some conservation methods include programs based "on didactic game through which children learn about the ecology, behaviour and conservation of these small primates" with the goal of increasing awareness in order to help preserve pygmy marmosets and their habitats. De La Torre and Morelos-Juarez believe that educating local communities can have positive long-term effects on conservation. For instance, they produced environmental education programs where the intention was to provide children with the tools to be able to reflect how their actions can affect the environment. De La Torre and Morelos-Juarez also have an initiative called "teaching teachers" where teachers were taught to create lessons on the environment and primate protection had positive results among children. Both authors however allude to the fact that empowering and educating local communities is not enough to protect the pygmy marmoset populations.
