= Contact call =

Contact calls are short, seemingly haphazard vocalizations made by many social animals, such as a chicken's cluck. Contact calls differ from other vocalizations, such as alarm calls, in that they are generally subtle, inconspicuous signals rather than loud, widely broadcast calls. Instead, they are brief vocalizations that often vary between individuals. In many cases, the message conveyed by a contact call is specific to the individual's or group's current activity, such as informing other members of the group of one's location while foraging for food.

Some social animal species also communicate the presence of potential danger by ceasing their contact calls, rather than producing alarm calls. Charles Darwin described this behavior in relation to wild horses and cattle.

== Humming as contact calls ==
Joseph Jordania suggested that human humming could have played a function of contact calls in early human ancestors. According to his suggestion, humans find it distressing to be in full silence (which is a sign of danger for them), and this is why humans who are alone sometimes hum, whistle, talk to themselves, or listen to TV or radio during other activities.

== Birds ==
Birds use contact calls in flight to establish location and to keep aware of each other's presence while flying and feeding. For some species, this call consists of a short, high-pitched sound, recognized and duplicated exactly by mates. Some fowl, such as geese,"honk" while in migration to communicate location and proximity to others in their flock.

In parapatric and sympatric species of birds, where territories of one species may border or overlap with that of another species, the contact calls of each species may divergently evolve to help differentiate one species from that of the other within close proximity. Where one species may have little to no variation among the contact calls of distinct allopatric populations, populations with overlapping territories may change their contact call to sound different from the bordering population's. The same variation pattern is seen in certain species of birds, such as the White-eyed Birds (Zosterops spp.) with increasing elevation and longitude/latitude.

=== Warning ===
Some species of birds have alarm calls to specifically warn other individuals of predators. The Black-capped Chickadee warns its kind of the level of threat an approaching predator is by the number of "de"s heard. Its call, chick-a-dee-dee-dee, might indicate more danger than chick-a-dee-dee. Some calls reveal more details about an approaching predator, indicated by the pitch or speed. When there is a threatening enemy in the air, such as a hawk or eagle, the Florida Scrub-Jay warns other jays to seek cover by using a thin, shrill-like call. In contrast, an approaching predatory feline provokes a low-pitched "scolding" sound, and calls on fellow jays for help in scaring the intruder away.

=== Comfort ===
Parrots kept as pets demonstrate contact calls with their human owners. Parrots make their call to establish that the human is within earshot, and continue to make the call (sometimes growing louder into a scream) until acknowledged. The screaming develops in pet parrots, as well as wild flock, when the animal feels like its needs are not being met because the contact call is not being understood.

== Deer ==
Deer communicate with contact calls, alarm calls and other calls to signal when they are ready to breed, to feed, to locate others in their group, after they have shed their velvet, to signal frustration, to summon nearby deer and to intimidate unwanted visitors.

=== Non-aggressive ===
- Location: Main contact call to signify location.
- Doe Grunt: Doe's call; used to summon fawns for feeding.
- Buck Grunt: Buck's call; used to summon fawns.
- Sparring: Signals that the deer has shed its velvet.
- Breeding Bellow: Doe is ready to breed.

=== Aggressive ===
- Sniff: Deer uses this call to intimidate unwanted deer visitors and prevent fighting.
- Wheeze: Buck makes this sound to intimidate other deer and to prevent fights.

== Primates ==
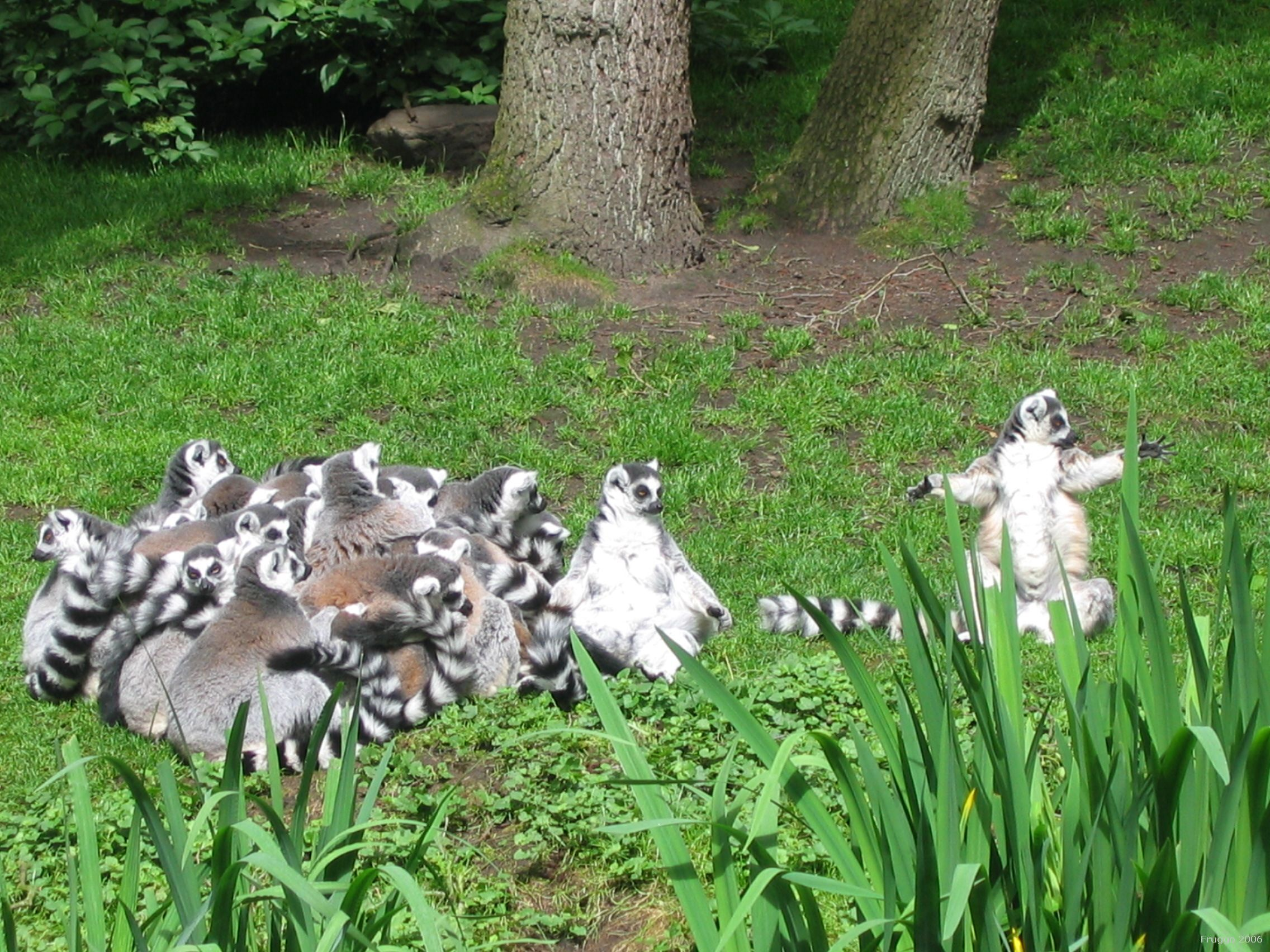
A troop of Ring-Tailed Lemurs

=== Ring-Tailed Lemurs ===
A ring-tailed lemur's contact call is used heavily to communicate and is classified on the level of excitement the lemur achieves in a situation. When low to moderately excited, the lemur moans; a "meow" is heard when the excitement is raised to a moderate level or when a situation will bring group togetherness. The loudest call occurs when a lemur is separated from its troop, and is recognizable by a distinct "wail."

=== Pygmy Marmosets ===
Pygmy marmosets have developed a vocal system in which two acoustically different contact calls have been established. These two different calls allow individual marmosets to identify others within their population. The call an individual uses varies as a response to the call that they've heard. If one of the contact calls is played over a loudspeaker (from a familiar location to the marmoset), the response from a given individual can be predicted, indicating that the calls are used as an identification mechanism of communication.

=== Baboons ===
Chacma Baboons have been observed to use contact calls not only as identification tools and locators of members of the group, but also as a way of communicating messages with one another about their status with respect to the main group. Mother baboons can recognize and locate the contact calls or barks of her offspring when they venture to forage or explore independently, such as to be able to find them if they get lost and need help finding their way back. The mother never barks back, unless she is in danger of being separated from the group (i.e. searching for her offspring will lead her too far astray from the group as it moves across the terrain). In this case, she will venture out slightly in the direction of the calling infant and bark back intermittently to let the lost baboon track her voice down and make its way back to the group.

== See also ==
- Animal communication
- Humming
- Singing
- Whistling
- Duck call
