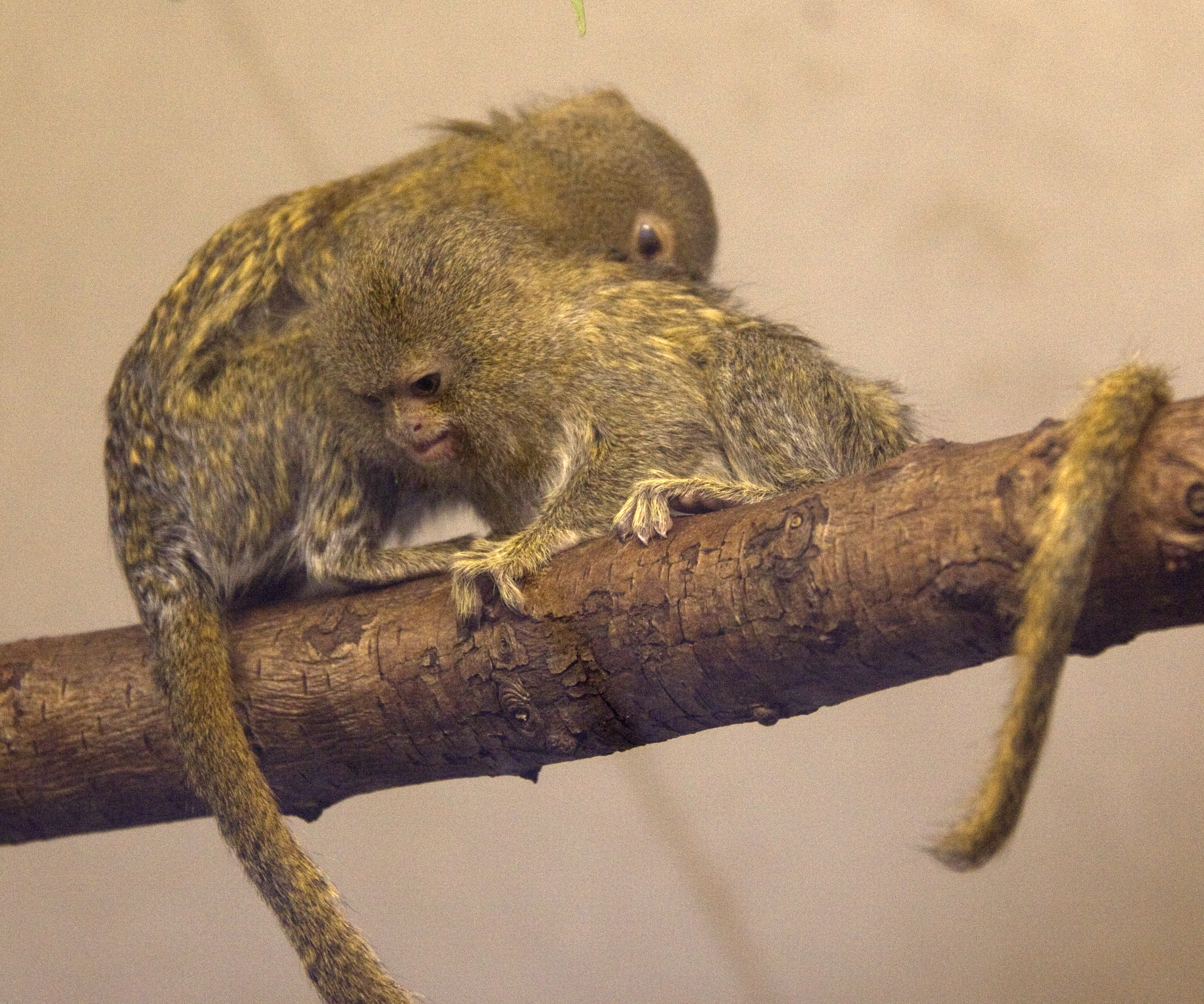
- Eastern pygmy marmosets in Dudley Zoo, England

Conservation status
- Vulnerable (IUCN 3.1)

Scientific classification
- Kingdom: Animalia
- Phylum: Chordata
- Class: Mammalia
- Infraclass: Placentalia
- Order: Primates
- Family: Callitrichidae
- Genus: Cebuella
- Species: C. niveiventris

Binomial name
- Cebuella niveiventris Lönnberg, 1940

= Eastern pygmy marmoset =

Species of New World monkey

The eastern pygmy marmoset (Cebuella niveiventris) is a marmoset species, a very small New World monkey, found in the southwestern Amazon rainforest in Bolivia, Brazil, Ecuador, and Peru. It was formerly regarded as conspecific with the similar western pygmy marmoset, but the eastern pygmy marmoset has whitish colored underparts. Although the eastern pygmy marmoset occurs further east than the western pygmy marmoset, the primary separators of their ranges are the Amazon River (Solimões River) and Maranon River, with the western occurring to the north of them and the eastern to the south. The species has recently been confirmed by DNA testing to exist in Ecuador, hundreds of kilometers north of the Maranon River.

== Physical description ==
The eastern pygmy marmoset weighs around 119 grams and have a head size ranging from 33.7 to 38.9mm, being one of the smallest New World monkeys. In the wild, full grown adult males weigh approximately 110 grams whereas adult females can weigh around 120 grams. All pygmy marmosets share a common attribute where they have a mane of fur covering their ears, arms that are longer than their hind legs, and they have no protocone in their first upper premolar tooth. Due to their specific diet, the eastern pygmy marmoset also has large lower incisors and a strong V-shaped lower jaw. The eastern pygmy marmoset also has claw-like nails which are beneficial for actions such as poking holes in tree bark to obtain food, as well as the claw-like nails allows them to cling vertically to tree trunks.

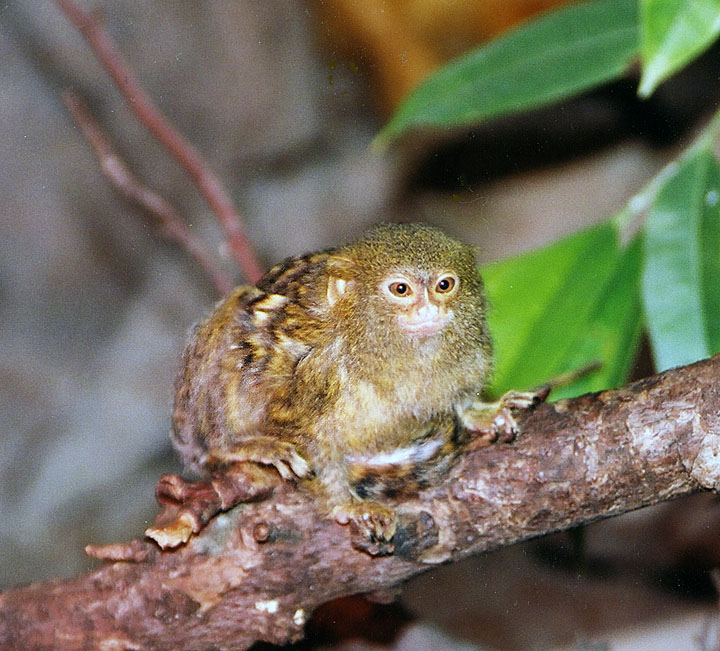
Captive eastern pygmy marmoset in Victoria, B.C, Canada

As different subspecies of the pygmy marmoset have different coloration patterns, the eastern pygmy is more of a white, pale color. The species has whiteish underparts which include their arms and legs, as well as their throat and chest having a more orange to white coloration.

== Ecology ==
=== Distribution ===
The eastern pygmy marmoset are small arboreal nonhuman primates that cover a large geographic distribution. As it was confirmed by DNA the eastern pygmy marmoset is located primarily south of the Rio Solimões river (Amazon River) covering parts of Peru, Brazil, Equator and Bolivia. The species covers a larger range in Brazil and Peru, present in the Amazonian lowlands and Andean foothills. The home range of this nonhuman primate also stretches a little into northern Bolivia.

=== Diet ===
The eastern pygmy marmoset is similar to the general species as they have a specific high-quality, rare food diet. They are considered mainly to be exudativores as well as insectivores. The eastern pygmy marmosets feed primarily on plant exudates which consist of tree sap, tree gum as well as latex from trees and lianas. This consists of a large portion of their diet. They are known at times to also eat arthropods, primarily being insects, and occasionally eat fruits for extra nutrition.

The species, due to their particular diet, has dental as well as nail adaptations in order to gnaw, dig, and cling vertically to trees; these are all behaviors associated with feeding as well as exudate foraging.
