= Brünninghausen =

Quarter of Dortmund, Germany

Coordinates: 51.4833°N 7.4667°E

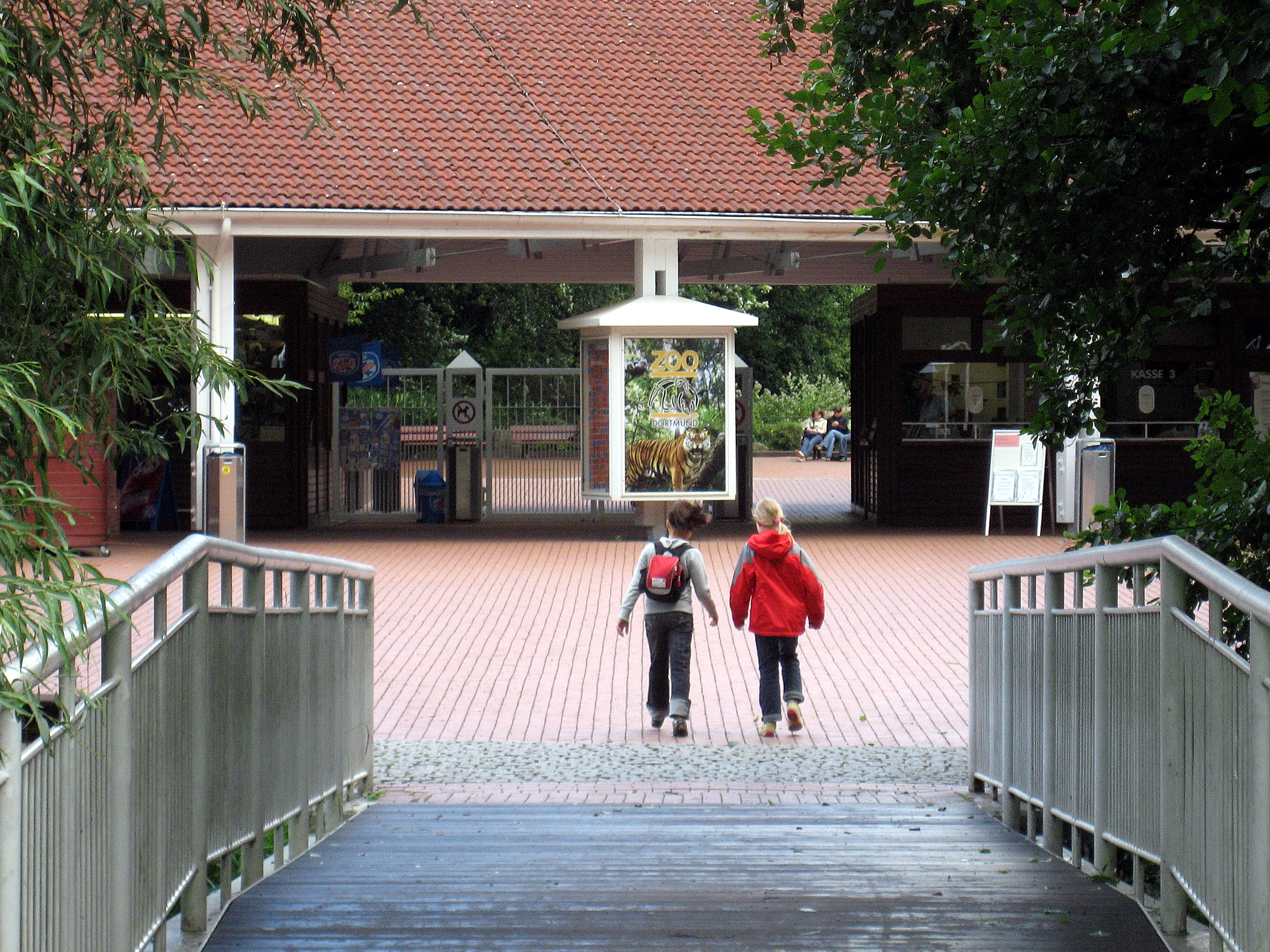
Entrance to Zoo Dortmund

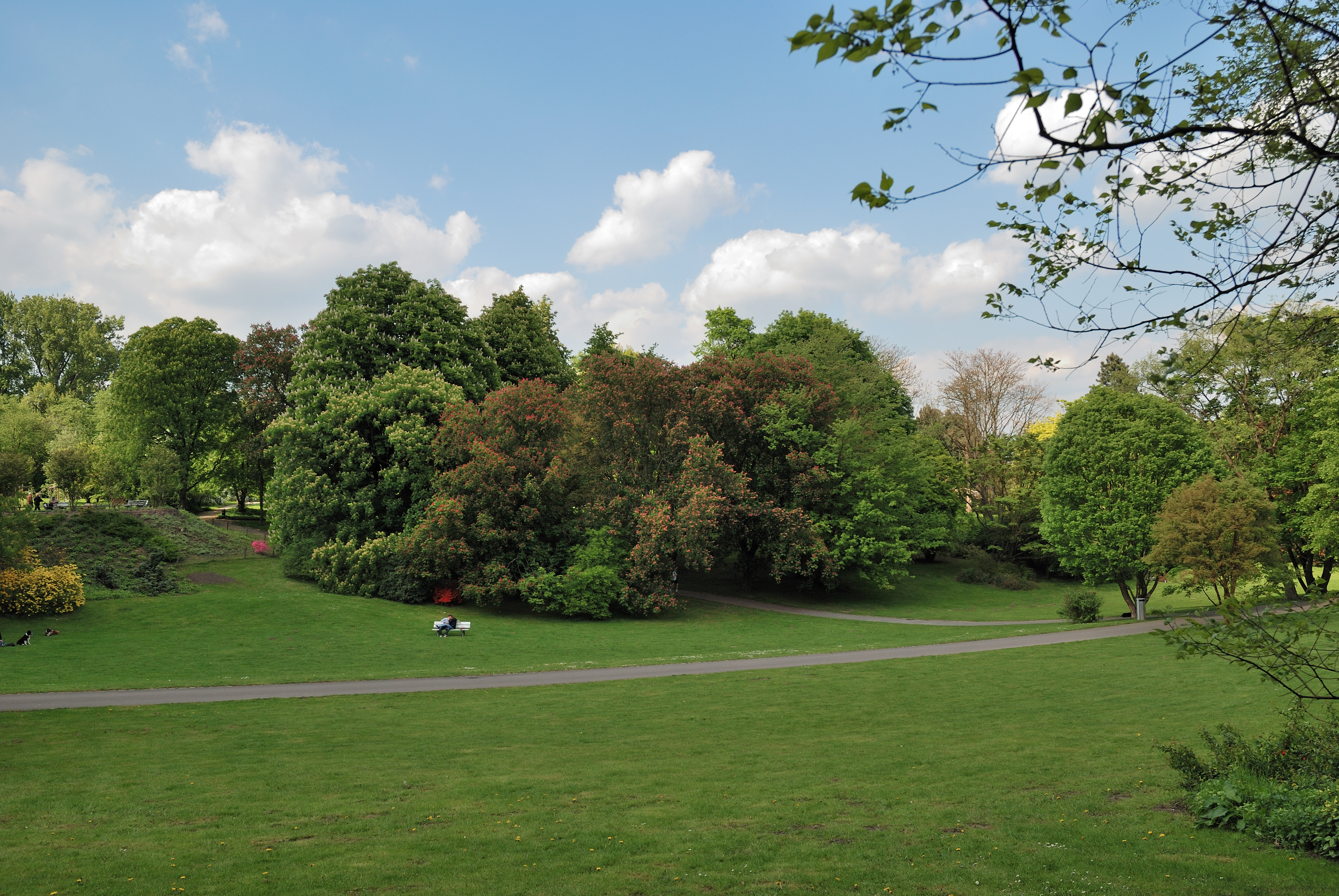
Rombergpark

Brünninghausen (German pronunciation: [bʁʏnɪŋˈhaʊzn̩]) is a Stadtteil (Quarter) in the south of the city of Dortmund in Germany. It belongs to the Stadtbezirk ("City District") Hombruch.

With a population of 3,913 and an area of 2.16 km^{2} it is one of the smaller parts of Dortmund.

The average annual income in Brünninghausen is about 50,600 Euro, which makes it one of the city's richest areas. It is home to the Zoo Dortmund and the Rombergpark.
