= Gummivore =

Animals that feed on the gum or sap of trees

A gummivore is an omnivorous animal whose diet consists primarily of the gums and saps of trees (about 90%) and insects for protein. Notable gummivores include arboreal, terrestrial primates like certain marmosets and lemurs. These animals that live off of the injuries of trees live from about 8m off of the ground up to the canopies. The feeding habit of gummivores is gummivory. (Note: Also spelled "gumivory", "gumnivory", or "guminivory". "Gummi-" is the preferred spelling as it derives from Latin gummi (gum) and is similar in form to gummiferous.)

== Specific traits ==
An Old World example of a gummivore is fork-marked lemurs, whose diet is about 90% gum exudates from a tree's branches or trunk. Lemurs have a “tooth comb”, made up of the lower incisors and canines. Fork-marked lemurs have more robust toothcombs than most other lemurs and use these specialized teeth to gouge the bark from the surface of a tree. Fork-marked lemurs also consume the gum seeping from beneath the bark of trees, via spaces created by beetles. Their long, slim tongue enables them to access these openings in the bark. They also possess a symbiotic bacterium that assists in the digestion of the gum, starting the process in the mouth.

The black-tufted marmoset (Callithrix penicillata) is a New World example that mostly lives off of the sap from trees. To do this, the monkey uses their lengthened lower incisors to chew through the bark of a tree and obtain the sap; this classifies it as a gummivore. The incisors are extremely specialized, since they are the marmosets’ “tool” to acquire food. The teeth have a thickened enamel on the exterior, but lack the enamel on the inside creating a tough, chiseling tool. Both the lemurs and marmosets have a gecko-like hand and catlike claws, which are extremely useful in clinging on to trees for extended amounts of time.

== Feeding strategies ==
Indentations made by marmosets in the bark of a cashew tree

Before feeding time comes around, the marmosets must prepare their food by chiseling multiple small holes into the barks of trees. The actual bite left behind is about 2–3 cm across and just deep enough to retrieve sap. After about a day passes, the primates will return to their bite marks and consume the leaking sap.

In order to consume gums and other indirect sources of nutrients, these animals must have a digestive system to compensate. Gums of trees are beta-linked polysaccharides that are not easily digested. These require a form of microbial fermentation to acquire the essential nutrients. This process takes the marmoset roughly 17.5 hours (± 1.6 hours) to completely digest, while carnivores take a mere 3–4 hours to digest proteins from meat. Though the digestive process takes some time, the gummivorous mammals have relatively low daily caloric needs, as they do not expend as much energy to acquire their food.

Gums contain galactose in form of galacturonic acid. This sugar is part of lactose, which is milk sugar, so consumption of gums in early mammals or their precursors might be a cause for development of mammary glands in mammals along with maternal instincts to feed their offspring and increased body lipids in females of early mammals.

== Shelter effects ==
Captivity in animals drives them away from their natural instincts and behaviors. Some gummivores are commonly held captive and even as household pets. A gummivore like the marmoset has the digestive system and oral tools required for feasting on saps of trees, but when fed more nutrient filled foods, there will be a severe change in the plasticity of the mammal. For example, if a marmoset's diet is changed, over the next few generations of that animal, it will adapt to those foods, rendering their natural adaptations useless such as the chiseling teeth and the bacterial fermentation.
