= Gum (botany) =

Sap or other resinous plant material

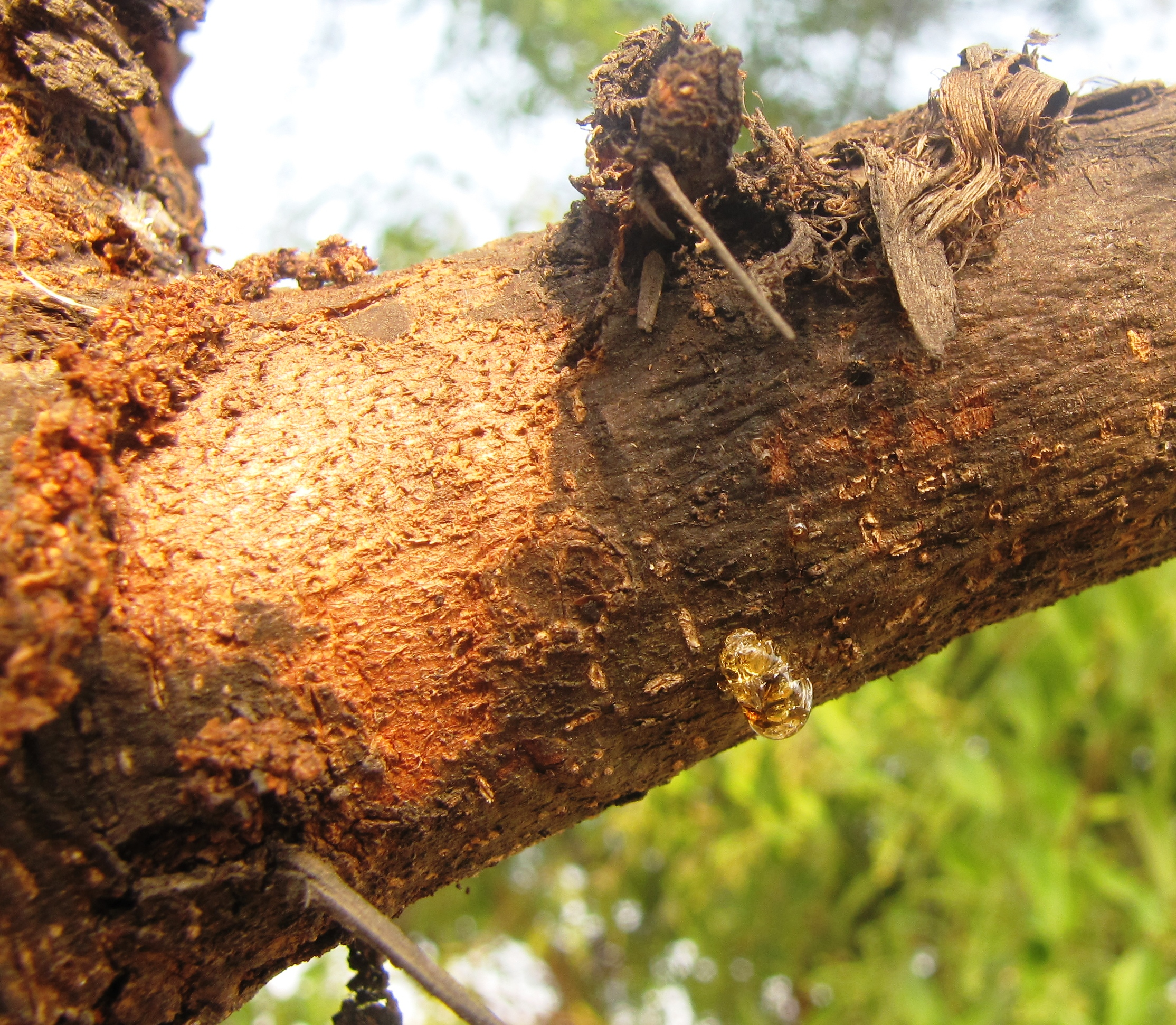
Gum arabic exuded from a wound in the trunk of Vachellia nilotica

Macro shot of plant gummosis, showing a natural amber-colored gum droplet on a stem.

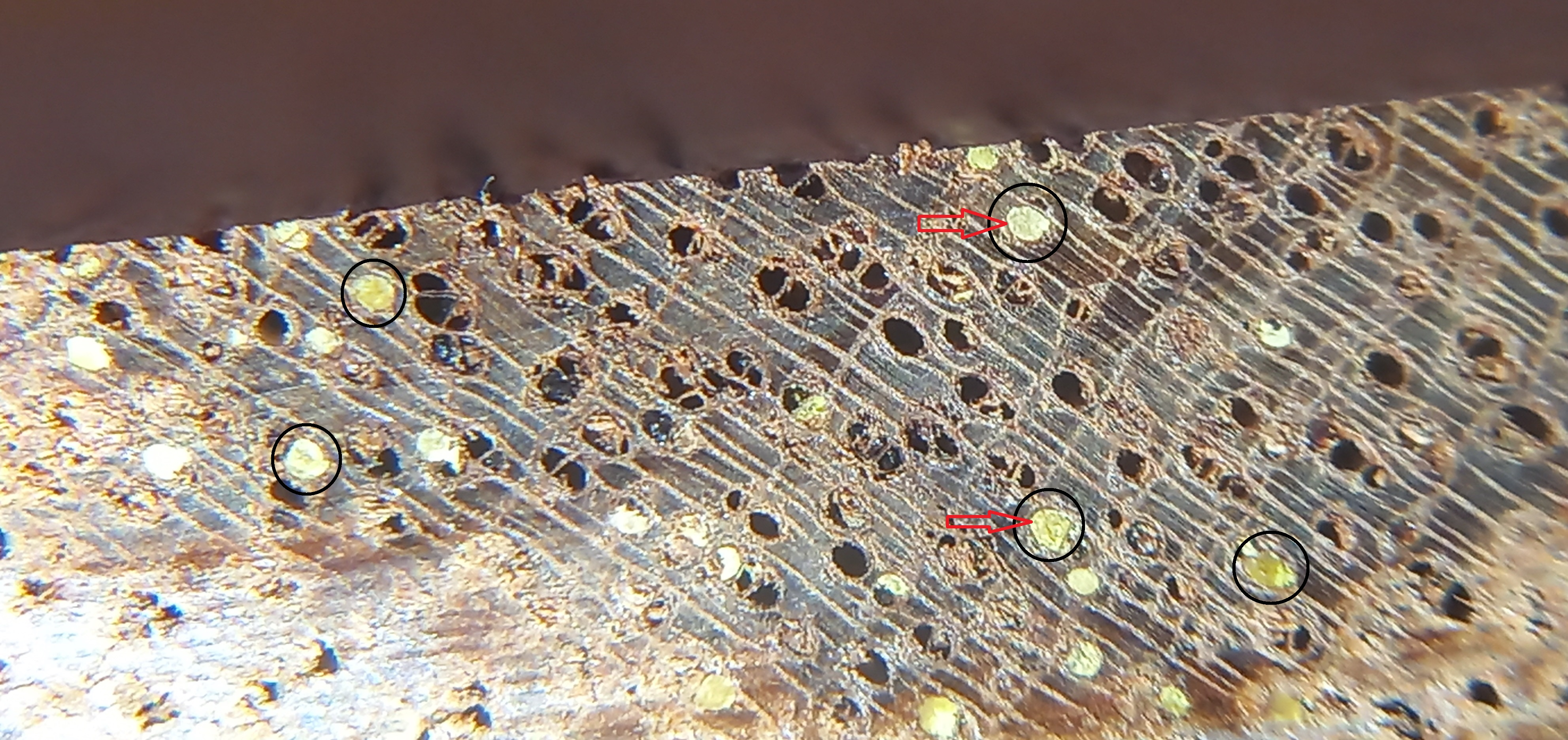
Gum deposits within wood vessels.

Gum is a sticky exudate of certain species of the plant kingdom. This material is polysaccharide-based and is most frequently associated with woody plants, particularly under the bark or as a seed coating. The polysaccharide material is typically of high molecular weight and most often highly hydrophilic or hydrocolloidal.

== As seed coating ==
Many gums occur as seed coatings for plant species; the adaptive purpose of some of these gummy coatings is to delay germination of certain flora seeds. An example of such a gummy coating occurs in the case of Western poison oak, a widespread shrub in western North America.

== See also ==
- Cambium
- Gummosis
- Latex
- Natural gum
