= Gummosis =

Formation of excess sap on plants

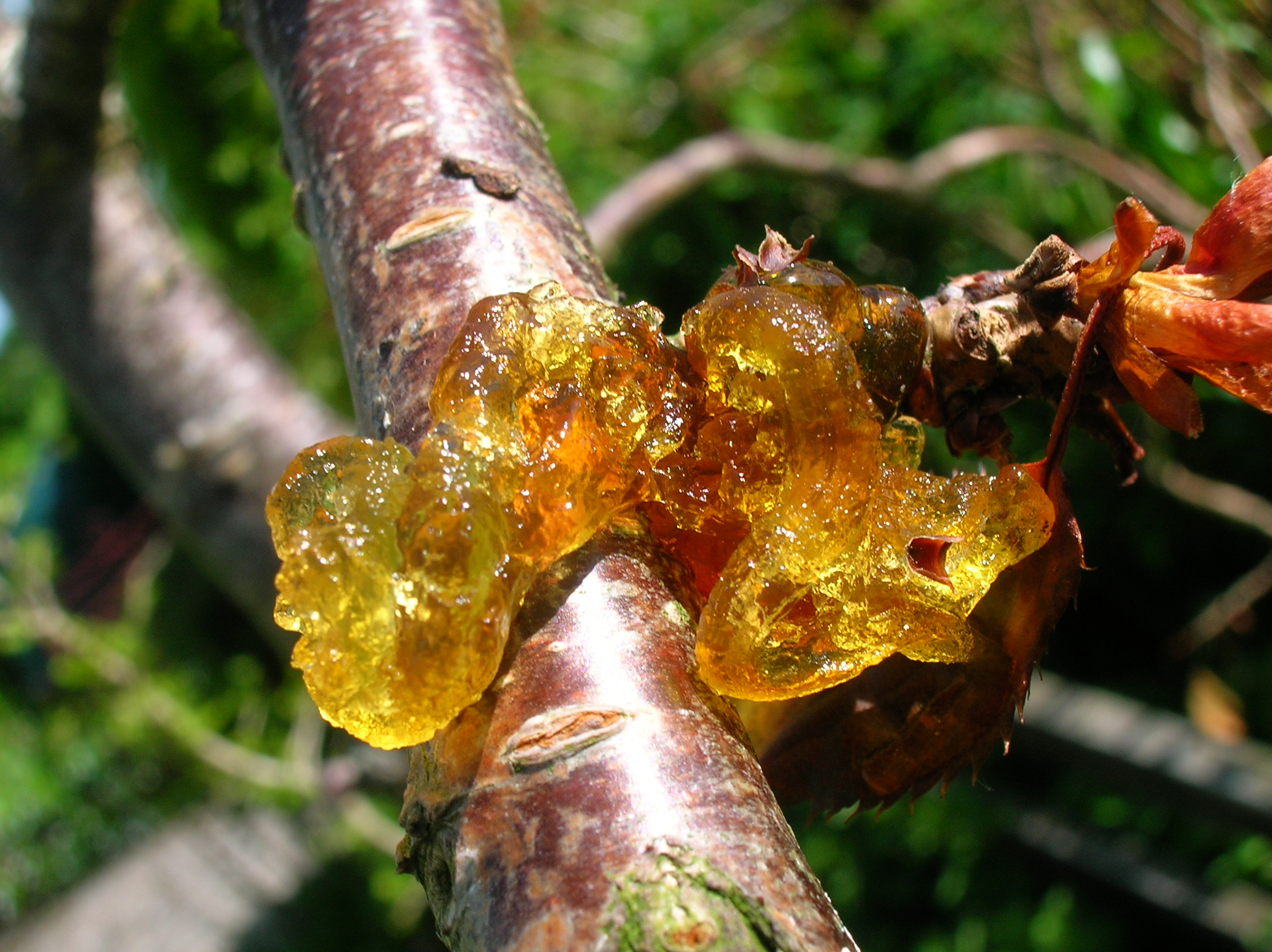
Canker-induced gummosis on a Tibetan cherry

Gummosis is the formation of patches of a gummy substance on the surface of certain plants, particularly fruit trees. This occurs when sap oozes from wounds or cankers as a reaction to outside stimuli such as adverse weather conditions, infections, insect problems, or mechanical damage. It is understood as a plant physiological disease.

== Damage ==
Liquefaction of wood pieces, especially young wood, causes disease foci to form under the bark, which secrete a gummy colorless to amber liquid, a plant gum, which then oozes out between the bark pieces on branches and trunk. The gum is composed of various sugar compounds and acids.

== Causes ==
The main causes are physiological disturbances of the tree, which can affect the water balance, among other things. Frost, injuries, but also bacteria and fungi, especially of the genus Hallimasch (Armillaria), can contribute to gum flow.

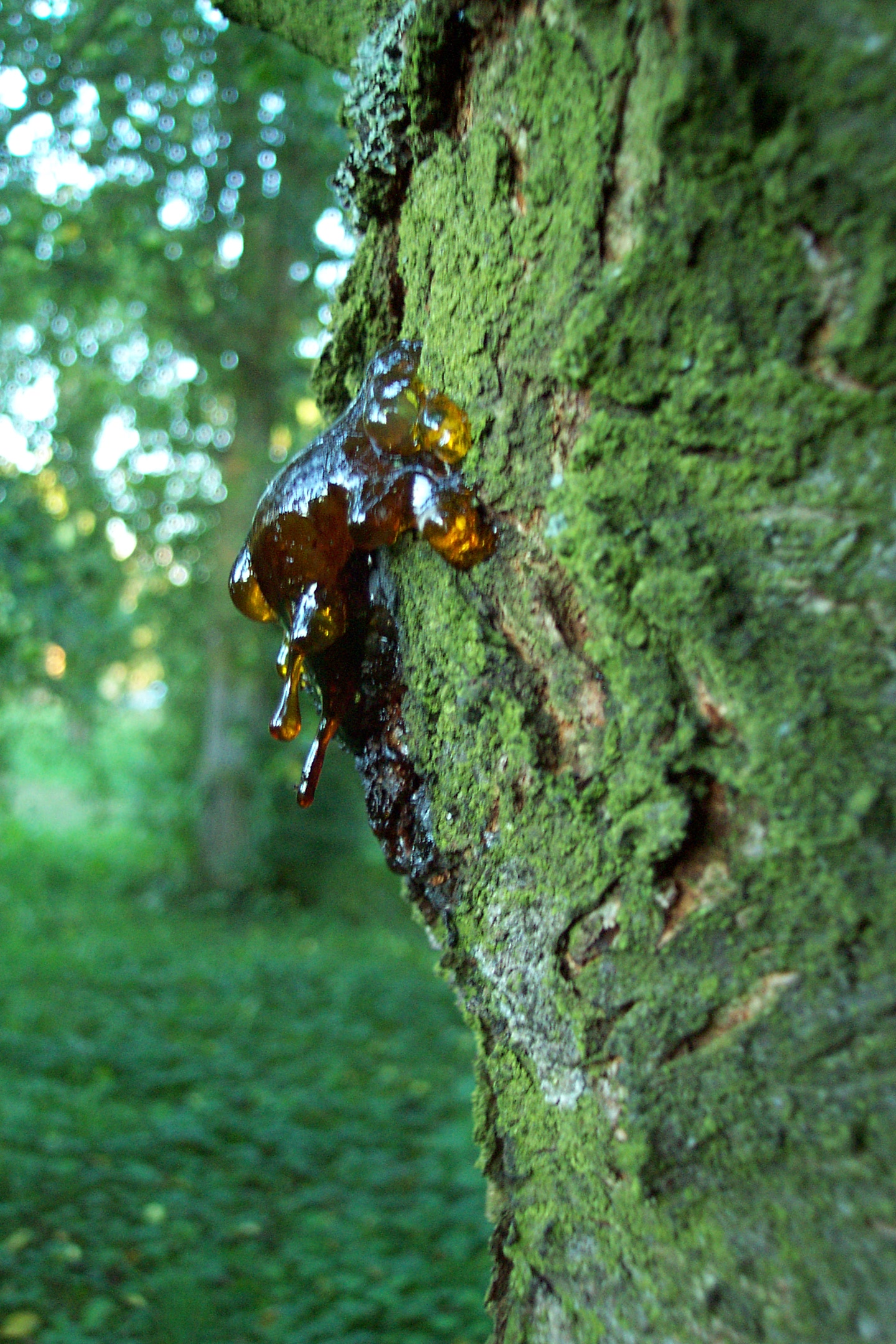
Plant sap rises from the bark of a cherry tree

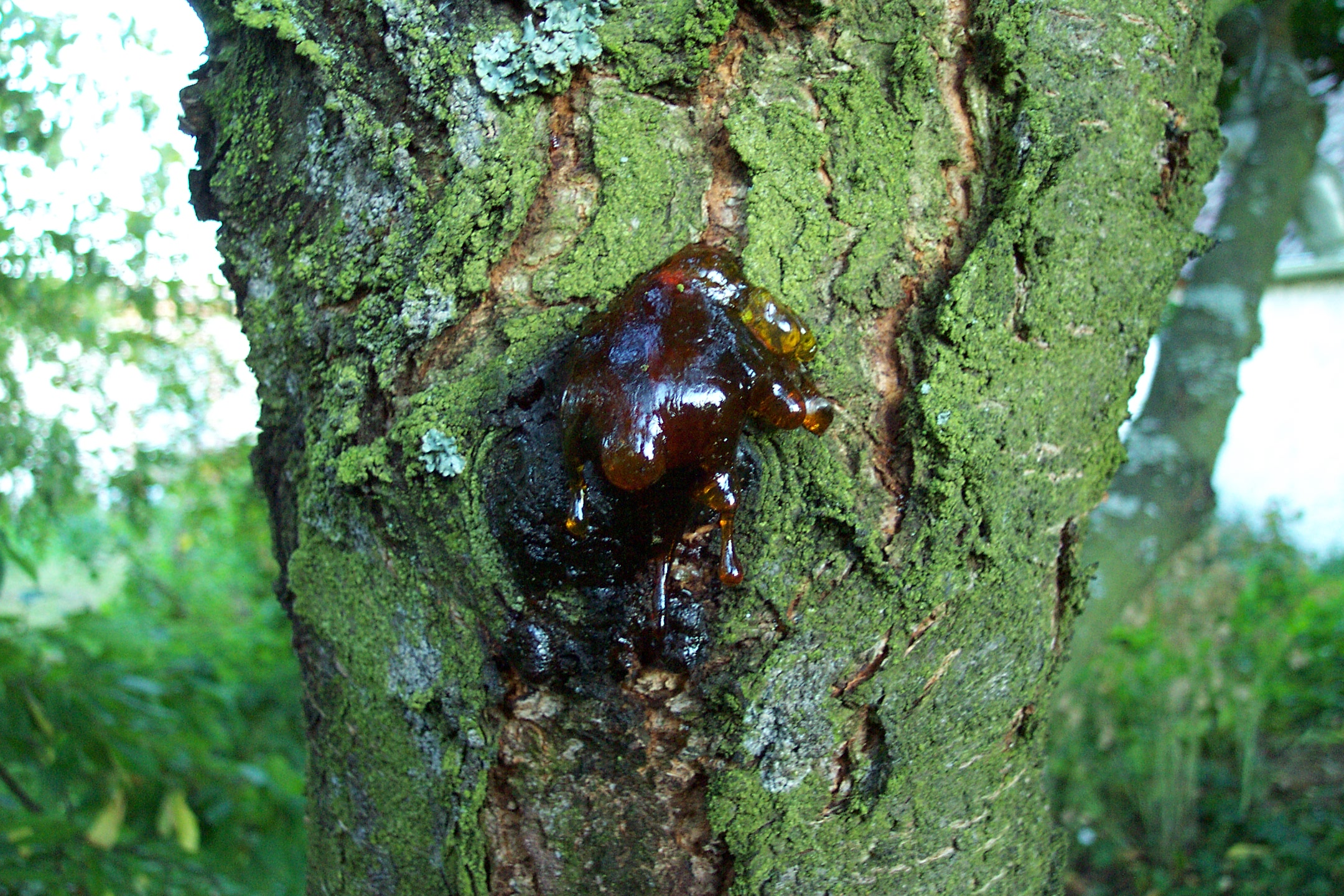

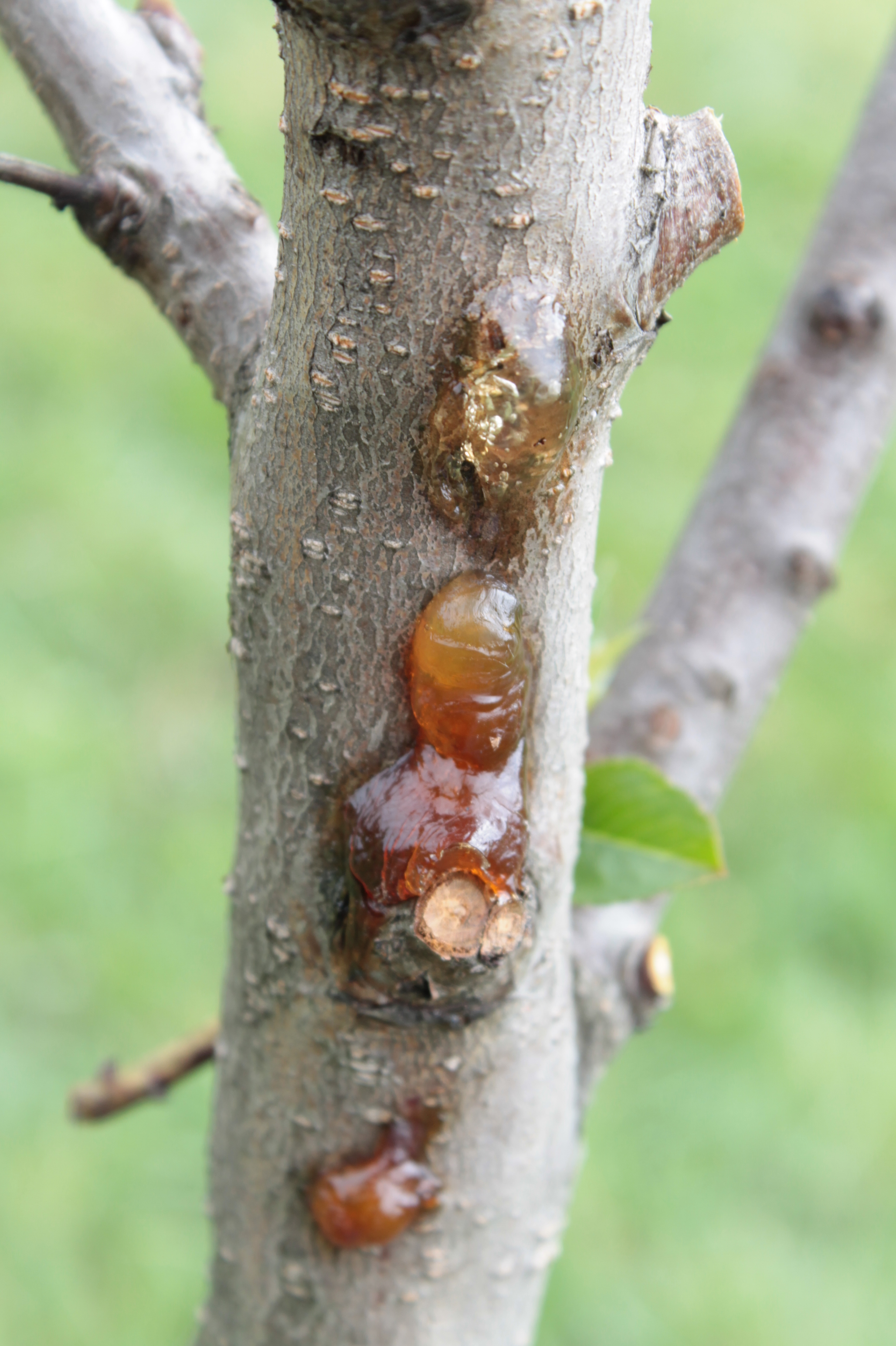

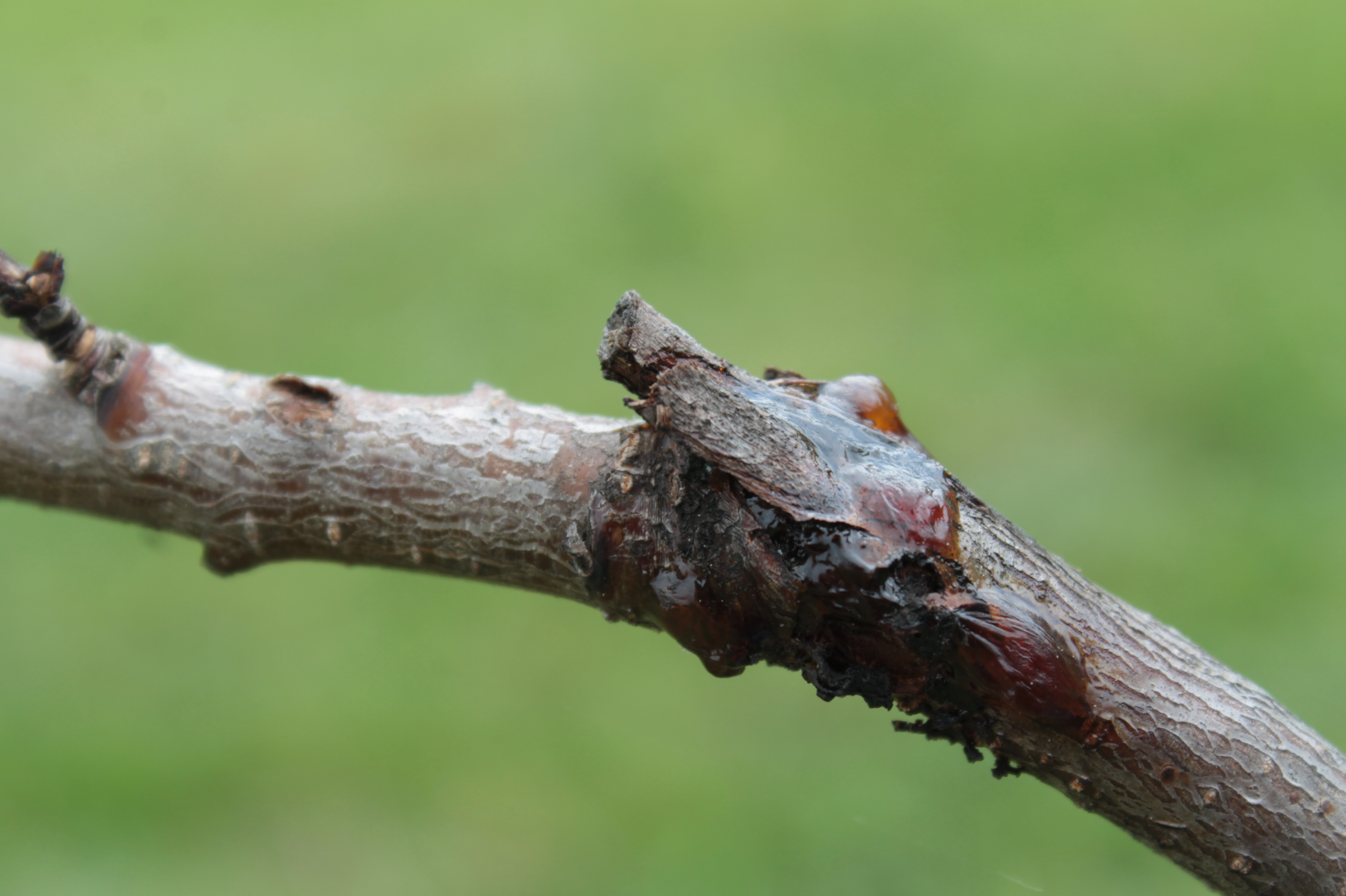

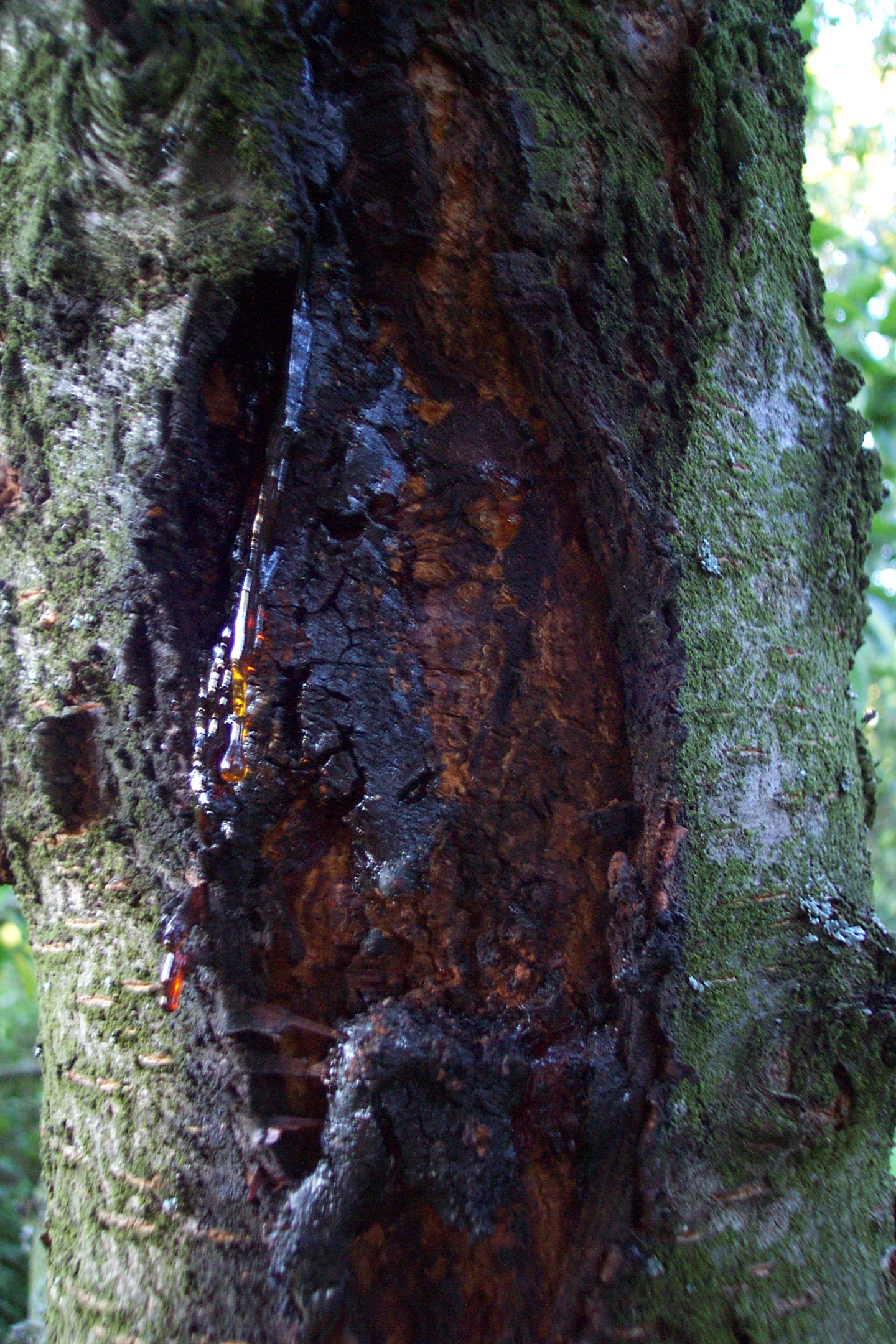

== See also ==
- Kino (botany)
