= Root microbiome =

Microbe community of plant roots

The root microbiome (also called rhizosphere microbiome) is the dynamic community of microorganisms associated with plant roots. Because they are rich in a variety of carbon compounds, plant roots provide unique environments for a diverse assemblage of soil microorganisms, including bacteria, fungi, and archaea. The microbial communities inside the root and in the rhizosphere are distinct from each other, and from the microbial communities of bulk soil, although there is some overlap in species composition.

Different microorganisms, both beneficial and harmful, affect the development and physiology of plants. Beneficial microorganisms include bacteria that fix nitrogen, various microbes that promote plant growth, mycorrhizal fungi, mycoparasitic fungi, protozoa, and certain biocontrol microorganisms. Pathogenic microorganisms can also include certain bacteria, fungi, and nematodes that can colonize the rhizosphere. Pathogens are able to compete with protective microbes and break through innate plant defense mechanisms. Some pathogenic bacteria that can be carried over to humans, such as Salmonella, enterohaemorhagic Escherichia coli, Burkholderia cenocepacia, Pseudomonas aeruginosa, and Stenotrophomonas maltophilia, can also be detected in root microbiomes and other plant tissues.

Root microbiota affect plant host fitness and productivity in a variety of ways. Members of the root microbiome benefit from plant sugars or other carbon rich molecules. Individual members of the root microbiome may behave differently in association with different plant hosts, or may change the nature of their interaction (along the mutualist-parasite continuum) within a single host as environmental conditions or host health change.

Despite the potential importance of the root microbiome for plants and ecosystems, our understanding of how root microbial communities are assembled is in its infancy. This is in part because, until recent advances in sequencing technologies, root microbes were difficult to study due to high species diversity, the large number of cryptic species, and the fact that most species have yet to be retrieved in culture. Evidence suggests both biotic (such as host identity and plant neighbor) and abiotic (such as soil structure and nutrient availability) factors affect community composition.

== Function ==
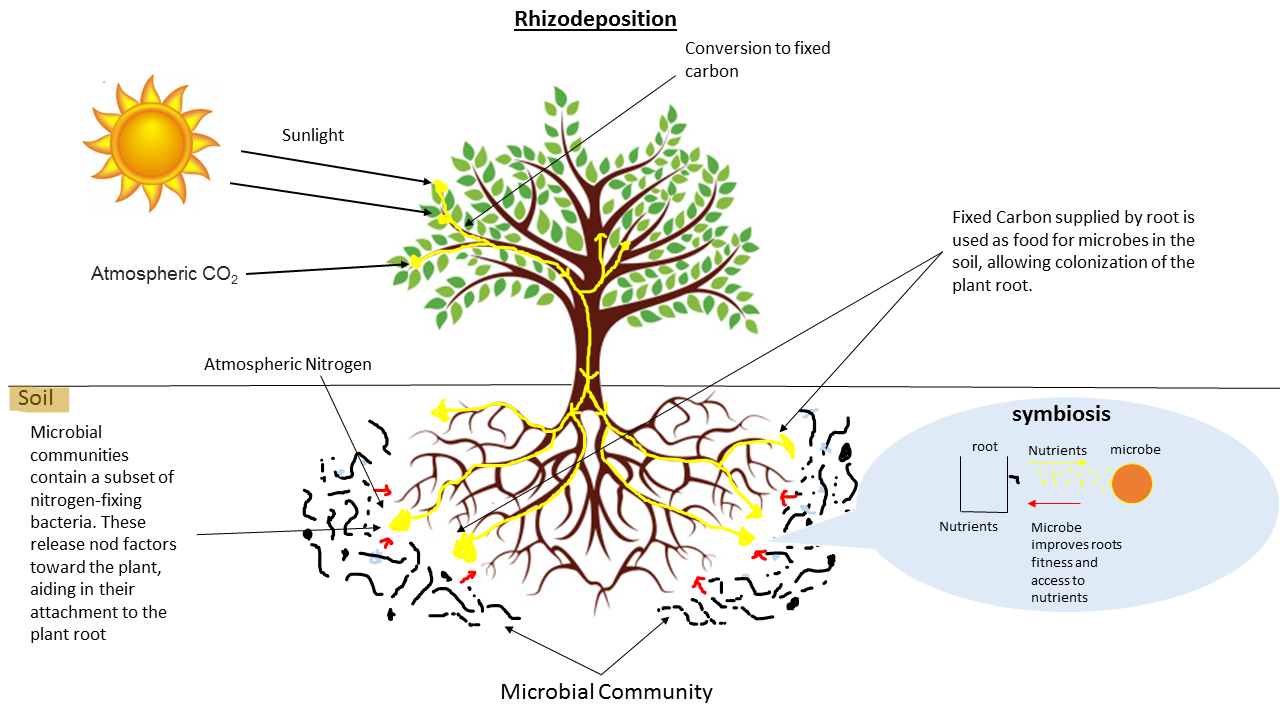
Sunlight and carbon dioxide from the atmosphere are absorbed by the leaves in the plant and converted to fixed carbon. This carbon travels down into the roots of the plant, where some travels back up to the leaves. The fixed carbon traveling to the root is radiated outward into the surrounding soil where microbes use it as food for growth. In return, microbes attach to the plant root where it improves the roots access to nutrients and its resistance to environmental stress and pathogens. In specific plant/root symbiotic relationships, the plant root secretes flavonoids into the soil which is sensed by microbes, where these microbes release nod factors to the plant root which promotes the infection of the plant root. These unique microbes carry out nitrogen fixation in root nodules, which supplies nutrients to the plant.

=== Types of symbioses ===
Root associated microbes include fungi, bacteria, and archaea. In addition, other organisms such as viruses, algae, protozoa, nematodes, and arthropods are part of root microbiota. Symbionts associated with plant roots subsist off of photosynthetic products (carbon rich molecules) from the plant host and can exist anywhere on the mutualist/parasite continuum.

Root symbionts may improve their host's access to nutrients, produce plant-growth regulators, improve environmental stress tolerance of their host, induce host defenses and systemic resistance against pests or pathogens, or be pathogenic. Parasites consume carbon from the plant without providing any benefit or providing insufficient benefit relative to their carbon consumption, thereby compromising host fitness. Symbionts may be biotrophic (subsisting off of living tissue) or necrotrophic (subsisting off of dead tissue).

=== Mutualist-parasite continuum ===
While some microbes may be purely mutualistic or parasitic, many may behave differently depending on the host species with which it is associated, environmental conditions, and host health. A host's immune response controls symbiont infection and growth rates. If a host's immune response is not able to control a particular microbial species, or if host immunity is compromised, the microbe-plant relationship will likely reside somewhere nearer the parasitic side of the mutualist-parasite continuum. Similarly, high nutrients can push some microbes into parasitic behavior, encouraging unchecked growth at a time when symbionts are no longer needed to aid with nutrient acquisition.

== Composition ==
Roots are colonized by fungi, bacteria, and archaea. Because they are multicellular, fungi can extend hyphae from nutrient exchange organs within host cells into the surrounding rhizosphere and bulk soil. Fungi that extend beyond the root surface and engage in nutrient-carbon exchange with the plant host are commonly considered to be mycorrhizal, but external hyphae can also include other endophytic fungi. Mycorrhizal fungi can extend a great distance into bulk soil, thereby increasing the root system's reach and surface area, enabling mycorrhizal fungi to acquire a large percentage of its host plant's nutrients. In some ecosystems, up to 80% of plant nitrogen and 90% of plant phosphorus is acquired by mycorrhizal fungi. In return, plants may allocate ~20–40% of their carbon to mycorrhizae.

=== Fungi ===
==== Plant-growth promoting fungi ====
Plant-growth promoting fungi (PGPF) are a diverse and heterogeneous group of non-pathogenic, filamentous, soil-borne fungi that colonize plant roots, particularly in the rhizosphere, and have a positive or mutualistic effect on plant health and development. PGPF, like their bacterial counterparts (PGPR - Plant Growth-Promoting Rhizobacteria), are a key component of the plant microbiome. Despite the name, not all fungi that promote plant growth are considered PGPF (e.g. mychorrhizal fungi).

==== Mychorrhizal fungi ====
Mycorrhizal (from Greek) literally means "fungus roots" and defines symbiotic interaction between plants and fungi. Fungi are important for decomposing and recycling organic material. However, the boundaries between the pathogenic and symbiotic lifestyles of fungi are not always clear-cut. Most of the time, the association is symbiotic, with the fungus improving nutrient and water acquisition or increasing stress tolerance for the plant and benefiting from the carbohydrates produced by the plant in return. Mycorrhizae include a wide variety of root-fungi interactions characterized by the mode of colonization. Essentially all plants form mycorrhizal associations, and there is evidence that some mycorrhizae transport carbon and other nutrients not only from soil to plant, but also between different plants in a landscape. The main groups include ectomycorrhizae, arbuscular mycorrhizae, ericoid mycorrhizae, orchid mycorrhizae, and monotropoid mycorrhizae. Monotropoid mycorrhizae are associated with plants in the monotropaceae, which lack chlorophyll. Many Orchids are also achlorophyllous for at least part of their life cycle. Thus, these mycorrhizal-plant relationships are unique because the fungus provides the host with carbon and other nutrients, often by parasitizing other plants. Achlorophyllous plants forming these types of mycorrhizal associations are called mycoheterotrophs.

==== Endophytes ====
Endophytes grow inside plant tissue—roots, stems, leaves—mostly symptomless. However, when plants age, they can become slightly pathogenic. They may colonize inter-cellular spaces, the root cells themselves, or both. Rhizobia and dark septate endophytes (which produce melanin, an antioxidant that may provide resilience against a variety of environmental stresses) are examples.

=== Bacteria ===
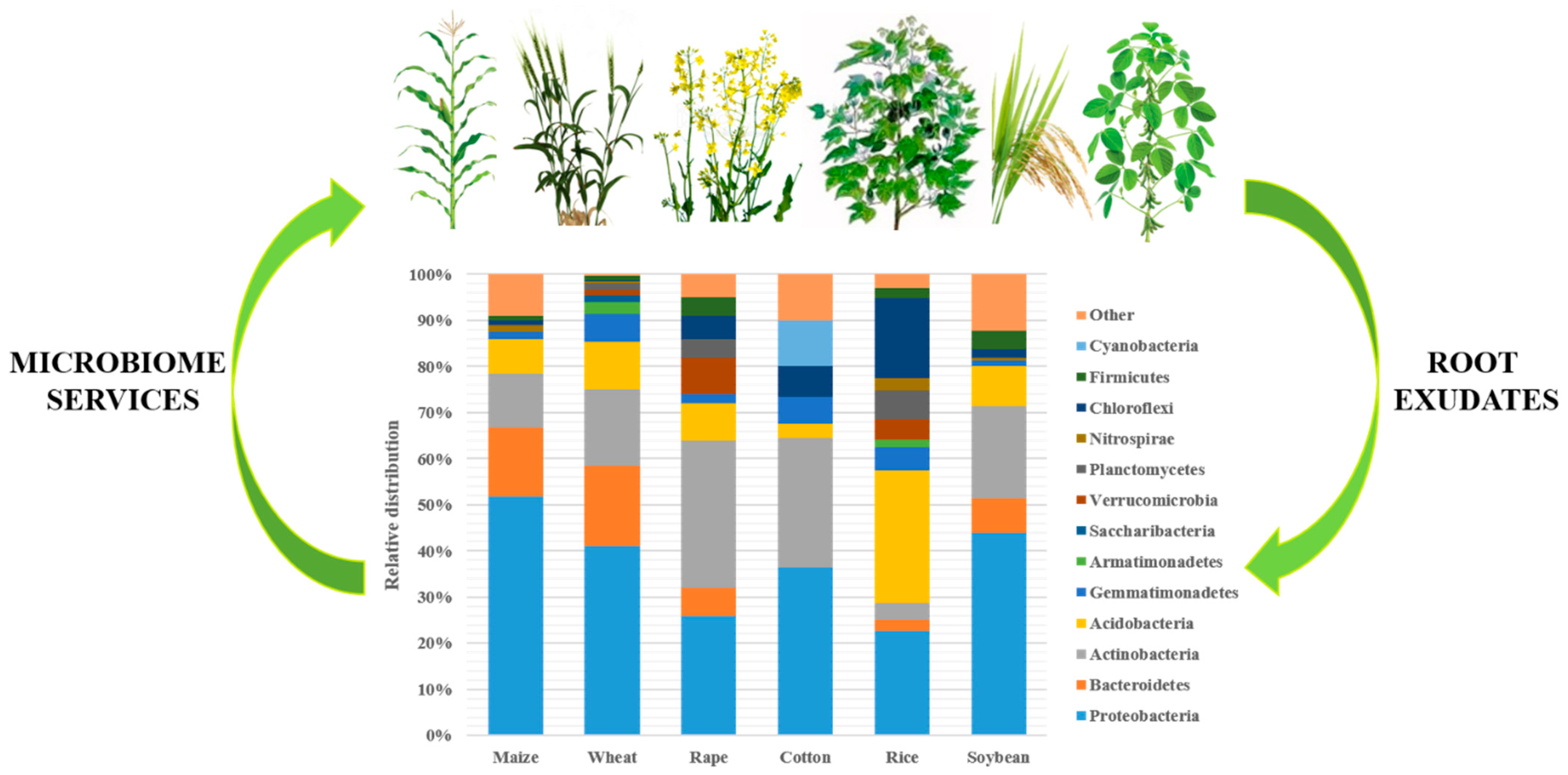
Relative abundance of different bacterial communities in different crops. The figure shows the results of reviews of microbiome distributions of six important crop plant species: maize, wheat, rape, cotton, rice, and soybean. Bacterial strains belonging to phyla Proteobacteria, Actinobacteria, Acidobacteria, Gemmatimonadetes and Chloroflexota were observed in all six crop plants.

The rhizosphere microbiome includes different groups of bacteria. They belong to the following phyla: Acidobacteria, Actinobacteria, Ascomycota, Bacteroidetes, Basidiomycota, Deinococcus-Thermus, Euryarchaeota, Firmicutes, and Proteobacteria. The bacterial community diversity and composition differ between different crop plants (see figure), with higher differences reported between different plant types, such as legumes, forbs, and grasses.

The zone of soil surrounding the roots is rich in nutrients released by plants and is, therefore, an attractive growth medium for both beneficial and pathogenic bacteria. Root associated beneficial bacteria promote plant growth and provide protection from pathogens. They are mostly rhizobacteria that belong to Pseudomonadota and Bacillota, with many examples from Pseudomonas and Bacillus genera. Rhizobium species colonize legume roots forming nodule structures. In response to root exudates, rhizobia produce Nod signalling factors that are recognized by legumes and induce the formation of nodules on plant roots. Within these structures, Rhizobium fix atmospheric nitrogen into ammonia that is then used by the plant. In turn, plants provide the bacteria with a carbon source to energize the nitrogen fixation. In addition to nitrogen fixation, Azospirillum species promote plant growth through the production of growth phytohormones (auxins, cytokinins, gibberellins). Due to these phytohormones, root hairs expand to occupy a larger area and better acquire water and nutrients. Pathogenic bacteria that infect plants infect plant roots are most commonly from Pectobacterium, Ralstonia, Dickeya and Agrobacterium genera. Among the most notorious are Pectobacterium carotovorum, Pectobacterium atrosepticum, Ralstonia solanacearum, Dickeya dadanthi, Dickeya solani, and Agrobacterium tumefaciens.

Bacteria attach to roots in a biphasic mechanism with two steps—first weak, non-specific binding, then a strong irreversible residence phase. Both beneficial and pathogenic bacteria attach in this fashion. Bacteria can stay attached to the outer surface or colonize the inner root. Primary attachment is governed by chemical forces or extracellular structures such as pili or flagella. Secondary attachment is mainly characterized by the synthesis of cellulose, extracellular fibrils, and specific attachment factors such as surface proteins that help bacteria aggregate and form colonies.

=== Archaea ===
Though archaea are often thought of as extremophiles, microbes belonging to extreme environments, advances in metagenomics and gene sequencing have revealed that archaea are found in nearly any environment, including the root microbiome. For example, root-colonizing archaea have been discovered in maize, rice, wheat, and mangroves. Methanogen and ammonium-oxidizing archaea are prevalent members of the root microbiome, especially in anaerobic soils and wetlands. Archaeal phyla found in the root microbiome include Euryarchaeota, Nitrososphaerota (formerly Thaumarchaeota), and Thermoproteota (formerly Crenarchaeota).

The presence and relative abundance of archaea in various environments suggest that they likely play an important role in the root microbiome. Archaea have been found to promote plant growth and development, provide stress tolerance, improve nutrient uptake, and protect against pathogens. For example, Arabidopsis thaliana colonized with an ammonia-oxidizing soil archaea, Nitrosocosmicus oleophilius, exhibited increased shoot weight, photosynthetic activity, and immune response.

Examination of microbial communities in soil and roots has identified archaeal organisms and genes with functions similar to that of bacteria and fungi, such as auxin synthesis, protection against abiotic stress, and nitrogen fixation. In some cases, key genes for plant growth and development, such as metabolism and cell wall synthesis, are more prevalent in archaea than bacteria.

Archaeal presence in the root microbiome can also be affected by plant hosts, which can change the diversity, presence, and health of archaeal communities.

=== Viruses ===
Viruses also infect plants via the roots; however, to penetrate the root tissues, they typically use vectors such as nematodes or fungi.

== Assembly mechanisms ==
There is an ongoing debate regarding what mechanisms are responsible for assembling individual microbes into communities. There are two primary competing hypotheses. One is that "everything is everywhere, but the environment selects," meaning biotic and abiotic factors pose the only constraints, through natural selection, to which microbes colonize what environments. This is called the niche hypothesis. Its counterpart is the hypothesis that neutral processes, such as distance and geographic barriers to dispersal, control microbial community assembly when taxa are equally fit within an environment. In this hypothesis, differences between individual taxa in modes and reach of dispersal explain the differences in microbial communities of different environments. Most likely, both natural selection and neutral processes affect microbial community assembly, though certain microbial taxa may be more restricted by one process or the other depending on their physiological restrictions and mode of dispersion.

Microbial dispersal mechanisms include wind, water, and hitchhiking on more mobile macrobes. Microbial dispersion is difficult to study, and little is known about its effect on microbial community assembly relative to the effect of abiotic and biotic assembly mechanisms, particularly in roots. For this reason, only assembly mechanisms that fit within the niche hypothesis are discussed below.

The taxa within root microbial communities seem to be partly drawn from the surrounding soil, though the relative abundance of various taxa may differ greatly from those found in bulk soil due to unique niches in the root and rhizosphere.

Recent evidence shows that seed-transmitted bacteria contribute significantly to the composition of the root microbiome. In wheat, they can dominate over soil-derived microbes and structure the rhizosphere community through niche partitioning and facilitation. These bacteria possess traits that allow them to degrade root-derived compounds and support the growth of other microbes, highlighting the importance of seed microbiota in microbial succession and community assembly within the rhizosphere.

=== Biotic assembly mechanisms ===
Different parts of the root are associated with different microbial communities. For example, fine roots, root tips, and the main root are all associated with different communities, and the rhizosphere, root surface, and root tissue are all associated with different communities, likely due to the unique chemistry and nutrient status of each of these regions, which differ from those of the bulk soil. For instance, root exudates provide specific carbon compounds that are enriched in the rhizosphere, selecting for microbial taxa with matching metabolic traits and shaping root-associated communities accordingly. Additionally, different plant species, and even different cultivars, harbor different microbial communities, probably due to host specific immune responses and differences in carbon root exudates. Host age affects root microbial community composition, likely for similar reasons as host identity. Recent evidence further demonstrates that plant developmental stage and domestication can strongly influence root microbiome assembly. In finger millet (Eleusine coracana), both rhizosphere and endosphere microbial communities were shown to shift dynamically throughout plant development, with the largest changes occurring during the flowering stage. The study found that only about 8% of the core microbiota was consistently shared between soil and plants, suggesting that plants selectively recruit microbial taxa from the surrounding microbial pool according to developmental needs. Differences between wild and domesticated cultivars further indicated that domestication influences the composition and assembly of root-associated microbial communities. The identity of neighboring vegetation has also been shown to impact a host plant's root microbial community composition.

=== Abiotic assembly mechanisms ===
Abiotic mechanisms also affect root microbial community assembly because individual taxa have different optima along various environmental gradients, such as nutrient concentrations, pH, moisture, temperature, etc. In addition to chemical and climatic factors, soil structure and disturbance impact root biotic assembly.

=== Succession ===
The root microbiome is dynamic and fluid within the constraints imposed by the biotic and abiotic environment. As in macroecological systems, the historical trajectory of the microbiotic community may partially determine the present and future community. Due to antagonistic and mutualistic interactions between microbial taxa, the taxa colonizing a root at any given moment could be expected to influence which new taxa are acquired, and therefore how the community responds to changes in the host or environment. While the effect of initial community on microbial succession has been studied in various environmental samples, human microbiome, and laboratory settings, it has yet to be studied in roots.

== See also ==
- Mangrove root microbiome
