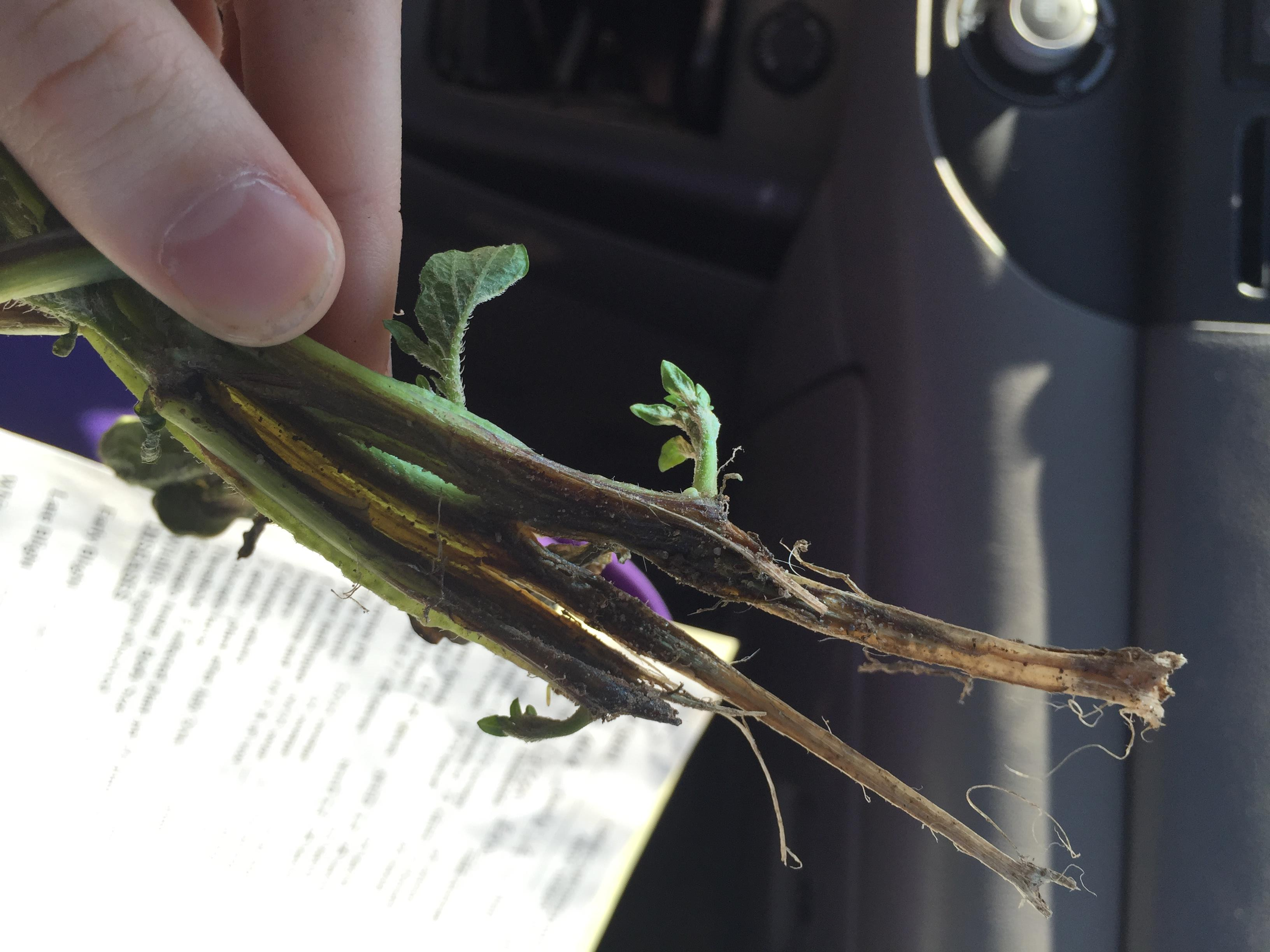
- The symptoms of Dickeya solani on a potato stem in early summer.

Scientific classification
- Domain: Bacteria
- Kingdom: Pseudomonadati
- Phylum: Pseudomonadota
- Class: Gammaproteobacteria
- Order: Enterobacterales
- Family: Pectobacteriaceae
- Genus: Dickeya
- Species: D. solani

Binomial name
- Dickeya solani van der Wolf et al. 2014

= Dickeya solani =

Species of bacterium

Dickeya solani is a bacterium that causes blackleg and soft rot in potato crops. Its symptoms are often indistinguishable from those caused by Pectobacterium but is more virulent, causing disease from lower levels of inoculum and spreading through the plant more effectively.

The species was first discovered in the Netherlands in 2005, before spreading rapidly, causing €25–30 million of damage annually by 2010. Three cases appeared in Scotland in 2009 and one in 2010.

== Host and symptoms ==
The host for Dickeya solani is the potato plant (Solanum tuberosum). Dickeya spp. can be the causal agents of soft rots and black leg. The symptoms that this bacteria causes can at times not be easily distinguished from the symptoms caused by Pectobacterium spp, since both pathogens induce a rotting of the plant tissue and black leg symptoms on the host. Black leg symptoms consist of wet, black rot on the stem that spread up from the original seed tuber. Symptoms of a Dickeya solani infection can include wilts and soft rots. The wilts occur when the bacterial pathogen invades the vascular system of the plant. The wilt symptoms can progress rather rapidly. Soft rots can be identified as soft, watery plant tissue with small, wet stem lesions.

== Pathogenesis ==
Dickeya solani can cause disease more effectively in temperate climates in comparison to other Dickeya spp. Furthermore, Dickeya solani is more aggressive in causing blackleg than other species. Dickeya solani can induce disease at lower inoculum levels. One reason for this is that Dickeya solani produces more cell wall degrading enzymes compared to other Dickeya spp. Dickeya spp. have virulence factors such as extracellular enzymes, type III secretion systems, and phospholipases. Dickeya spp. have cell wall degrading enzymes such as cellulases and proteases that digest the plant cell wall and allow the pathogen to infect the plant. The usage of cell wall degrading enzymes is sometimes categorized as a “brute force” method. However, there are less blunt ways that Dickeya spp. can attack the host, the type III secretion system can code for hypersensitive response and pathogenicity (hrp) genes. In some Dickeya species the hrp genes are involved early on in pathogenesis. Dickeya solani can code for zeamine, which is a phytotoxin. The genes for coding zeamine are not well-conserved among the Dickeya spp. However these synthesis genes are similar in Dickeya zeae and Dickeya solani. During the evolution of Dickeya pathogens these genes were most likely acquired through horizontal gene transfer late in the evolutionary process. Dickeya solani also produces antifungal compounds including oocydin A and the novel compound solanimycin which are thought to help it outcompete fungi.

== Disease cycle ==
In the spring, primary inoculum can be found in the seed tubers. There are three major steps in the infection process. The pathogen must first be able to adhere to the plant's surface and penetrate it either via a wound or a natural opening such as the stomata. Following penetration, the bacteria invades and then degrades the cell wall. In late spring to the summer the bacteria can spread from the original seed tuber to the developing roots and stems. Dickeya solani can invade quickly and the bacterial cells relay on a cell to cell communication method called quorum sensing. In quorum sensing, the cells communicate with each other via small signaling molecules. The bacterial cells can reproduce in the intercellular spaces and can generate enzymes that degrade or destroy the plant cell wall. Once the cell wall is degraded a liquification of the stem and the original seed tuber occurs. New tubers growing alongside the diseased tuber may become contaminated in the late summer into the early fall. During harvest, mechanical injuries can occur on the tuber which can provide more entry spots for Dickeya solani. The disease can then spread more when the potato tubers are put into storage. Rotten tubers that were discarded can allow for disease dispersal. Dickeya solani can overwinter in soil on plant residues.
