= Soft rot Enterobacteriaceae (SRE) small RNAs =

Soft rot Enterobacteriaceae (SRE) (spanning the genera Erwinia, Pectobacterium, Dickeya, and Pantoea), are ubiquitous necrotrophic bacterial pathogens that infect a large number of different plant species worldwide, including economically important crops.

When they live in soil outside of their plant hosts they starve and have to adapt to this new condition. By using strand-specific RNA-seq analysis and in silico sRNA predictions 137 small RNAs candidates were identified in Pectobacterium atrosepticum under starvation conditions. This suggests that sRNAs play roles in bacterial adaptive response. The expression of 9 novel candidate sRNAs was validated by RT-PCR. Those included antisense RNAs and UTR regions.
