= C1377H2208N382O442S17 =

The molecular formula C_{1377}H_{2208}N_{382}O_{442}S_{17} (molar mass: 31731.9 g/mol) may refer to:

- Asparaginase
- Pegaspargase
