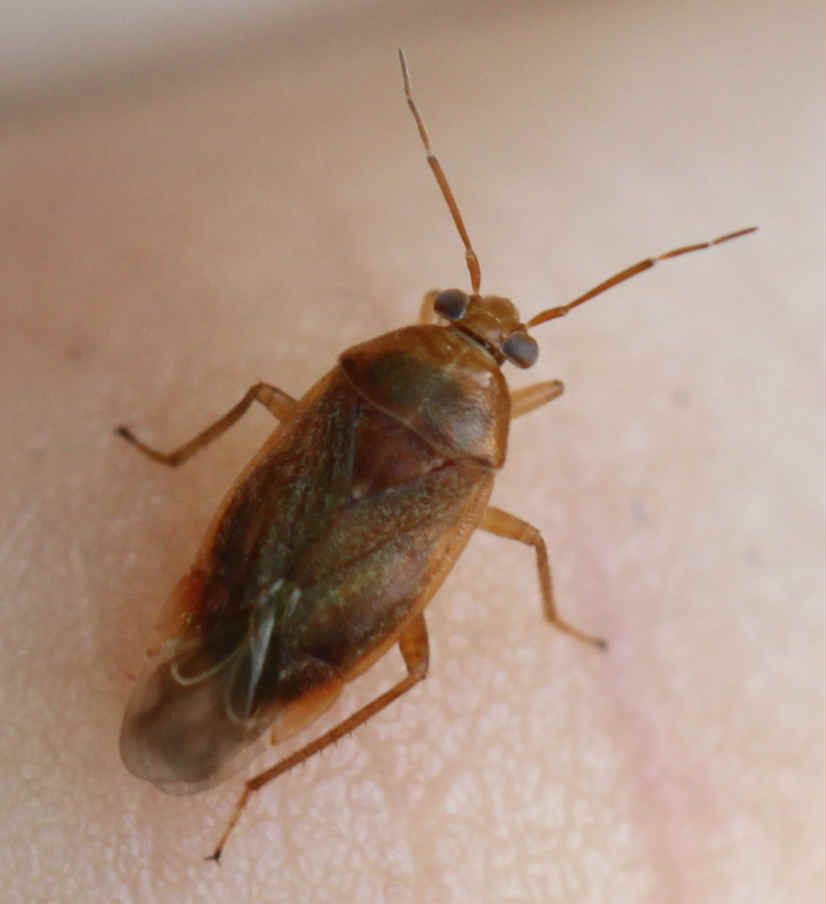

Scientific classification
- Kingdom: Animalia
- Phylum: Arthropoda
- Clade: Pancrustacea
- Class: Insecta
- Order: Hemiptera
- Suborder: Heteroptera
- Family: Miridae
- Genus: Agnocoris
- Species: A. reclairei

Binomial name
- Agnocoris reclairei (Wagner, 1949)

Synonyms
- Lygus reclairei Wagner, 1949

= Agnocoris reclairei =

Species of true bug

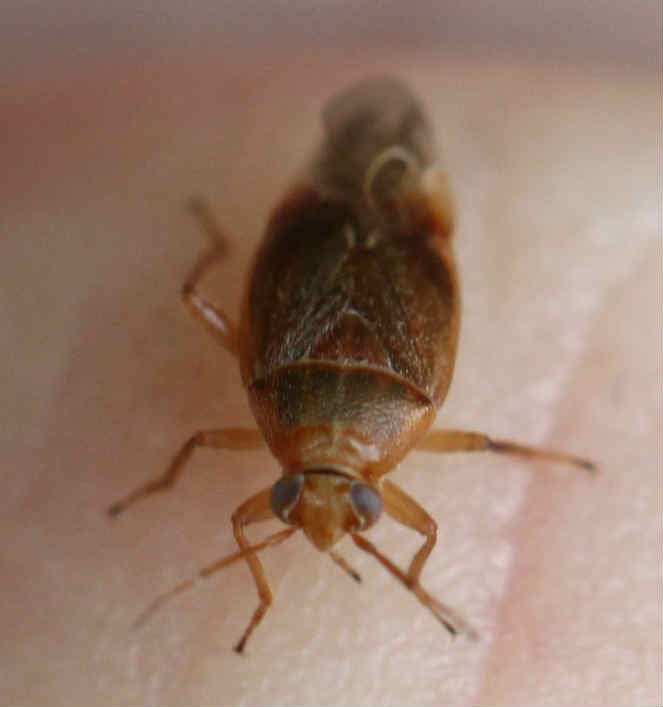

Agnocoris reclairei is a species of plant bug in the family Miridae.

== Description ==
The colour of an adult is brown, and is 4.5–5 millimetres (0.18–0.20 in) long.

== Habitat ==
The species live in white willows, and prefers wet areas. Can also be found in conifers, litter, and moss.
