= Pectobacterium wasabiae =

Scientific classification
- Domain: Bacteria
- Kingdom: Pseudomonadati
- Phylum: Pseudomonadota
- Class: Gammaproteobacteria
- Order: Enterobacterales
- Family: Pectobacteriaceae
- Genus: Pectobacterium
- Species: P. wasabiae

Binomial name
- Pectobacterium wasabiae Gardan et al. 2003

Species of bacterium

Pectobacterium wasabiae is a plant pathogenic bacterium that was first reported to cause disease on wasabi plants. A closely related species, yet to be formally named, also causes disease on potato. Unlike most Pectobacterium, P. wasabiae strains lack a type III secretion system. Its type strain is CFBP 3304^{T}(=LMG 8404^{T} =NCPPB 3701^{T} =ICMP 9121^{T}).
