= Pectolase =

Pectolase may refer to one of two enzymes:

- Pectin lyase
- Polygalacturonase

== See also ==
- Polygalacturonase activity
