= Bacterial soft rot =

Bacterial plant disease

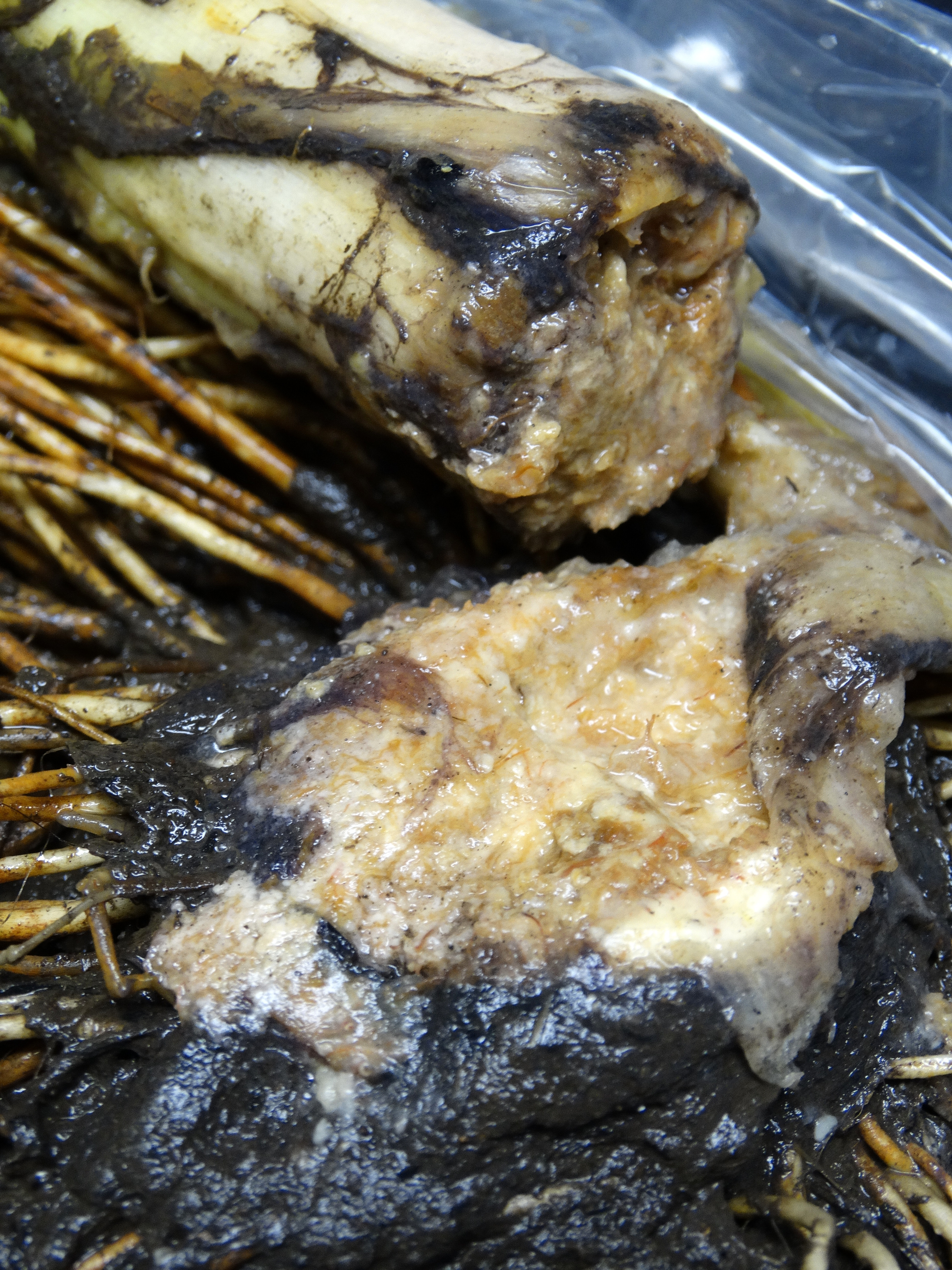
Bacterial soft rot on taro (Colocasia esculenta)

Bacterial soft rots are caused by several types of bacteria, but most commonly by species of gram-negative bacteria, Erwinia, Pectobacterium, and Pseudomonas. It is a destructive disease of fruits, vegetables, and ornamentals found worldwide, and affects genera from nearly all the plant families. The bacteria mainly attack the fleshy storage organs of their hosts (tubers, corms, bulbs, and rhizomes), but they also affect succulent buds, stems, and petiole tissues. With the aid of special enzymes, the plant is turned into a liquid mush in order for the bacteria to consume the plant cell's nutrients. Disease spread can be caused by simple physical interaction between infected and healthy tissues during storage or transit. The disease can also be spread by insects. Control of the disease is not always very effective, but sanitary practices in production, storing, and processing are something that can be done in order to slow the spread of the disease and protect yields.

== Hosts and symptoms ==
There are a variety of hosts including but not limited to; banana, beans, cabbage, carrot, cassava, coffee, corn, cotton, onion, other crucifers, pepper, potato, sweet potato and tomato. Pandanus conoideus and karuka (Pandanus julianettii) get bacterial soft rot and necrosis on the leaves from Pectobacterium carotovorum subsp. carotovorum. For each host there are different symptoms displayed. Most symptoms are along the lines of watery and soft decay of the tissue. Cabbage and crucifers' symptoms start where the tissue makes contact with the soil. Often there is a change in color and in the case of a carrot, the whole taproot can be decayed leaving just the epidermis. Sweet potatoes show clear lesions that grow rapidly leaving a recognizable watery and soft, oozy tissue where only the peel remains intact.

Potatoes experience a cream to tan colored tuber that becomes very soft and watery. A characteristic black border separates the diseased area and the healthy tissue. Only when the secondary organism invades the infected tissue does that decay become slimy with a foul odor. Like the carrot, the whole tuber can be consumed leaving just the epidermis in the soil. The foliage becomes weak and chlorotic with upward turned leaves and lesions on the stem. The stem also rots and becomes mushy with its colorless or brown lesions.

=== Dormant symptomless stage ===
Soft rots are characterized by their distinct maceration of hosts' cell walls with pectolytic enzymes, and subsequent digestion of the intracellular fluid as the bacteria grows. But little is known about the pathogen's interaction with its host at earlier stages when it is still attaching to, and growing within the host with no symptoms present. In fact, the bacteria may develop large populations within a plant before any symptoms can be seen. No one knows exactly why the bacteria have this dormant stage, or what factors influence the bacteria's virulence, but the research is being done.

== Disease cycle ==
There are many ways in which a plant can become infected by a bacterial soft rot. They can be host to the bacteria either by being infected as seed, or from direct inoculation into wounds or natural openings (stomata or lenticels) in mature plants, which is most common. But, when a plant is infected and the conditions are favorable, the bacteria immediately begin feeding on liquids released from injured cells and start replicating. As they replicate they release more and more pectolytic enzymes that degrade and break down cell walls. And, because of the high turgor pressure within the cells, this maceration effectively causes the cells to explode and die providing more food for the bacteria.

As they gorge on intracellular fluid, the bacteria continue to multiply and move into the intercellular spaces, with their cell-wall-degrading enzymes ahead of them preparing the plant tissues for digestion. Often the epidermis is left unscathed, keeping the rotten flesh contained within until a crack allows the ooze to leak out and infect others around it.

When the plant organs are harvested and placed into storage, those that are infected will automatically infect the others placed with it. When certain insects are present, the eggs laid over the stored vegetables will be invaded by the bacteria, becoming host and transporter, able to infect others as they grow. The bacteria then overwinters within the plant tissues, insect hosts, or in the soil and lay dormant until the conditions are right again to reproduce. If the infected storage organs are being used to propagate the plant, or if infected seed was produced, then when spring comes the bacteria will begin to grow just as its host does. Also in the spring, the contaminated insect eggs hatch into larvae and begin to cause infection within the host plant. The larvae then become adults, leave its infected host, and move on to unknowingly inoculate more plants to start the cycle over again.

== Environment ==
Growth of the bacteria is possible between 32–90 °F, with the most ideal conditions between 70–80 °F. Post-harvest storage and transportation is difficult for tropical and other warm environments when the air is not properly ventilated during these processes. Higher temperatures and high humidity are ideal growing conditions for the bacteria making ventilation a big priority when trying to combat this disease.

== Management ==
There are very few things that can be done to control the spread of bacterial soft rots, and the most effective of them have to do with simply keeping sanitary growing practices.

Storage warehouses should be removed of all plant debris, and the walls and floors disinfected with either formaldehyde or copper sulfate between harvests. Injury to plant tissues should be avoided as much as possible, and the humidity and temperature of the storage facility should be kept low using an adequate ventilation system. These procedures have proven themselves to be very effective in the control of storage soft rot of potato in Wisconsin.

It also helps if plants are planted in well-drained soils, at intervals appropriate for adequate ventilation between plants. Few varieties are resistant to the disease and none are immune, so rotating susceptible plants with non-susceptible ones like cereals is a practice positive to limiting soft rot infection.

The control of specific insect vectors is also a good way of controlling disease spread in the field and in storage. Soil and foliage insecticide treatment helps controls the bugs that frequently cause wounds and disseminate the bacteria.

== Importance ==
Due to its wide range of hosts, bacterial soft rot devastates many significant crops both in the field and in storage all over the world. Almost all fresh vegetables are subject to infection by bacterial soft rots. But, it is not just the vegetables that are susceptible; in the tropics, soft rot develops on important crops like corn, cassava, and banana even while still in the field. Specifically, soft rot of potatoes can cause a huge decrease in yield, and is the most serious bacterial disease that potatoes are exposed to. For a grower of potatoes, there is a possibility that 100% of a whole season's yield could be destroyed due to insufficient conditions in a storage facility. In turn this impacts customers with reduced quantities of produce for sale, a reduction in quality, and an increase in expense. All in all, bacterial soft rots cause a greater loss of produce than any other bacterial disease known.

== Origin ==
The bacteria, Erwinia carotovora or Pectobacterium carotovorum, is gram-negative, anaerobic, rod-shaped and named after the carrot it was first isolated from. Found mostly in tropical, warm regions of the world. Because the organism is spread in so many ways, there is speculation that it was introduced to water through aerosols and runoff into water bodies. Specifically this could have happened through dumping potatoes that were infected and disposed of.

== See also ==
- SRE small RNA

== Bibliography ==
- Agrios, George N. (2005), "Plant Pathology," 656–662.
- Brooklyn Botanic Garden. (2000): Natural disease control: A common-sense approach to plant first aid. Handbook # 164. Brooklyn Botanic Garden, Inc. 1000 Washington Avenue, Brooklyn, NY.
- Johnson, S. (1999): Blackleg and bacterial soft rot. Potato Facts. Bulleting No. 2493. University of Maine.
- Ploetz, R.; et al. Editors. (1998): Compendium of tropical fruit diseases. APS Press, The American Phytopathological Society. Saint Paul, Minnesota, USA.
- Thurston, D. (1998): Tropical plant diseases. Second Edition. APS Press. The American Phytopathological Society. St. Paul, Minnesota, USA.
