= Robert S. Dickey =

American phytopathologist (1921–1991)

Robert S. Dickey (18 January 1921 in Riverside – 1 July 1991 in Prescott) was an American phytopathologist, professor emeritus of Plant Pathology at the Cornell University and the namesake of the bacterial genus Dickeya.

He also was the recipient of a Silver Star for actions while serving in the 39th Infantry Regiment of the U.S. Army during World War II.

== Education ==
Dickey attended public schools in Riverside, California. In 1941, he earned an A.A. degree from the Riverside Junior College.

Dickey earned a BS degree in plant science in 1948, and in 1954 earned a PhD in plant pathology on the thesis Studies of the Longevity of Agrobacterium Tumefaciens (Smith and Townsend) Conn in the Soil, both at the University of California, Berkeley.

== Phytopathology ==
In 1952, Dickey became an assistant professor and extension agent on the subject of cereal, potato, and forage crop diseases at the Cornell University, where in 1954 he became the project leader of the extension project on plant pathology, a position he retained until 1958. From 1959—after the retirement of Walter H. Burkholder—until his retirement in 1987, he held a research/teaching position on bacterial plant diseases.

From 1970 to 1987, he also worked for the Department of Plant Pathology at the Pennsylvania State University, as member of the graduate faculty and, from 1974 onward, as adjunct professor.

=== Research ===
Dickey published papers in multiple scientific journals, such as Phytopathology, the Annual Review of Phytopathology, and the International Journal of Systematic and Evolutionary Microbiology, as well as in the first volume of Bergey's Manual of Systematic Bacteriology.

Much, though not all, of his research was focused on the genus Erwinia. The new genus Dickeya was named after him in 2005 for his research on the "Erwinia chrysanthemi complex". (Note: The strains considered at the time to belong to P. chrysanthemi or B. paradisiaca.) Erwinia chrysanthemi (Note: Or Pectobacterium chrysanthemi. Both are considered synonymous to the current scientific name Dickeya dadantii.) is one of the species reassigned to the new genus.

He also researched the wilt disease Pseudomonas caryophylli (Note: Now Trinickia caryophylli) causes on carnation, during which he and C. W. D. Brathwaite discovered the synergy between P. caryophylli and Corynebacterium species on carnation, a discovery published in 1970 in Phytopathology, in the paper Synergism between Pseudomonas caryophylli and a Species of Corynebacterium.

== Military service ==
Dickey served in the 9th Infantry Division of the U.S. army from September 1942 to January 1946. In November 1944, he was awarded with a Silver Star Medal for actions during operations in Germany on 13 October of the same year.
