= Apulose kinase =

Enzyme

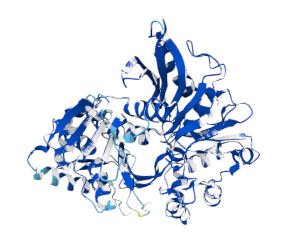
- Ribbon diagram of apulose kinase as folded through AlphaFold

Identifiers
- EC no.: 2.7.1.233

Databases
- IntEnz: IntEnz view
- BRENDA: BRENDA entry
- ExPASy: NiceZyme view
- KEGG: KEGG entry
- MetaCyc: metabolic pathway
- PRIAM: profile
- PDB structures: RCSB PDB PDBe PDBsum
Search
- PMC: articles
- PubMed: articles
- NCBI: proteins

Apulose kinase is a transferase (enzyme) that is involved in the catabolic pathway of D-apiose. The enzyme, studied in bacterial species, catalyzes the following reaction

Apulose + ATP= apulose-4-phosphate + ADP+ H

This enzyme is encoded in the gene apIK in the bacterial species Pectobacterium atrosepticum.
