= Brenneria salicis =

Scientific classification
- Domain: Bacteria
- Kingdom: Pseudomonadati
- Phylum: Pseudomonadota
- Class: Gammaproteobacteria
- Order: Enterobacterales
- Family: Pectobacteriaceae
- Genus: Brenneria
- Species: B. salicis

Binomial name
- Brenneria salicis (Day 1924); Hauben et al. 1999

Synonyms
- Bacterium salicis Day 1924; Phytomonas salicis (Day 1924) Magrou 1937; Pseudobacterium salicis (Day 1924) Krasil’nikov 1949; Erwinia amylovora var. salicis Martinec and Kocur 1963; Pseudomonas saliciperda Lindeijer 1932; Erwinia salicis (Day 1924) Chester 1939

Species of bacterium

Brenneria salicis is a Gram-negative bacterium that is pathogenic on plants.

The bacterium is known to cause 'watermark disease' in willow (Salix ssp.) trees. Watermark disease affects infected trees by occluding the xylem vessels, impeding circulation. Early signs of the disease are wilting or dried-out, dead leaves on intermittent branches throughout the tree's crown. Cross sections from affected branches show a watery, transparent discoloration to an orange-brown staining in the wood. Cross sections of a killed tree's main stem are blanched completely white.

The white willow, S. alba, is very sensitive to watermark disease, while the crack willow, S. fragilis, is considerably less so. Hybrids of these two species have shown intermediate sensitivity.

== Host and symptoms ==
The only known susceptible host of watermark disease are trees of the genus Salix, or willows. Watermark disease typically occurs in willow in lowland areas, but has been observed in mountainous areas of Japan as well. Salix alba, white willow in Europe, has been shown to be particularly susceptible to watermark disease and is the host on which most observations of watermark disease have been made.

Symptoms of watermark disease include wilting and browning of stems. Infected branches and trunks can be identified by red-brown staining in the sapwood that is restricted to the outer most rings. More severe symptoms include death of the entire tree. Shoot development from infected branches usually results in the spread of the pathogen onto these shoots. An identifiable sign of the casual pathogen is oozing of Brenneria salicis from wounded, stained wood. The pathogen is capable of infecting plant matter without creating symptoms as well.

Signs and symptoms of watermark disease caused by Brenneria salicis are summarized in the following table.

	Symptoms			
Leaves	abnormal color	early leaf fall	necrotic spots	wilting
Stems	dieback	discoloration	ooze (sign)	
Whole plant	death	dieback		

== Pathogenesis ==
Brenneria salicis infects the xylem of its host. Studies using large amounts of inoculum released from infected hosts reveal that the bacteria do not readily infect other hosts. Experimental attempts at inoculation have resulted in only 10% of hosts successfully developing symptoms. Culturing Brenneria salicis has shown to be difficult, further complicating the study of the pathogen.

Brenneria salicis has a long incubation period prior to the development of symptoms. The presence of the pathogen on foliage during this latent phase does not mean infection, and willows with Brenneria salicis present in the latent phase may never develop symptoms. As with most bacterial plant pathogens, the bacteria require a wound or opening such as stomata to enter the plant.

Like many bacterial pathogens, Brenneria salicis is naturally dispersed in air and water. There is no evidence of the spread of the pathogen through insect vectors or seeds. The propagation of willows vegetatively reveal infection in young (one to three years old) willow trees, suggesting the pathogen can survive latently in propagating material.

After emerging from its latent phase, branches will wilt and turn reddish-brown as the bacteria colonize the xylem. Bacterial colonies occlude xylem vessels, impeding circulation. The spread of the pathogen continues within the xylem, and the infection will transfer hosts with wounding or propagation of infected material.

== Management ==
Watermark disease was first investigated in cultivated willows in England and is common among Salix alba of Europe in lowlands; however, the disease has also been observed at elevation in Japan. Inoculation studies have suggested that climate is a key factor, yet differences between known environments suggest more research is needed to understand the environmental range of Brenneria salicis.

The most effective form of management of watermark disease is the removal of infected willow trees. Laws in certain communities that use willow commercially for cricket bats require the removal of infected trees. It is recommended to look for symptoms between May and October. If symptoms are present it is recommended that the trees are felled, and the plant matter is destroyed by burning. There are no known clones of willow tree that are resistant or immune to the disease. Breeding for resistance is not a control method that is employed due to the limited incidence and impact of watermark disease.
