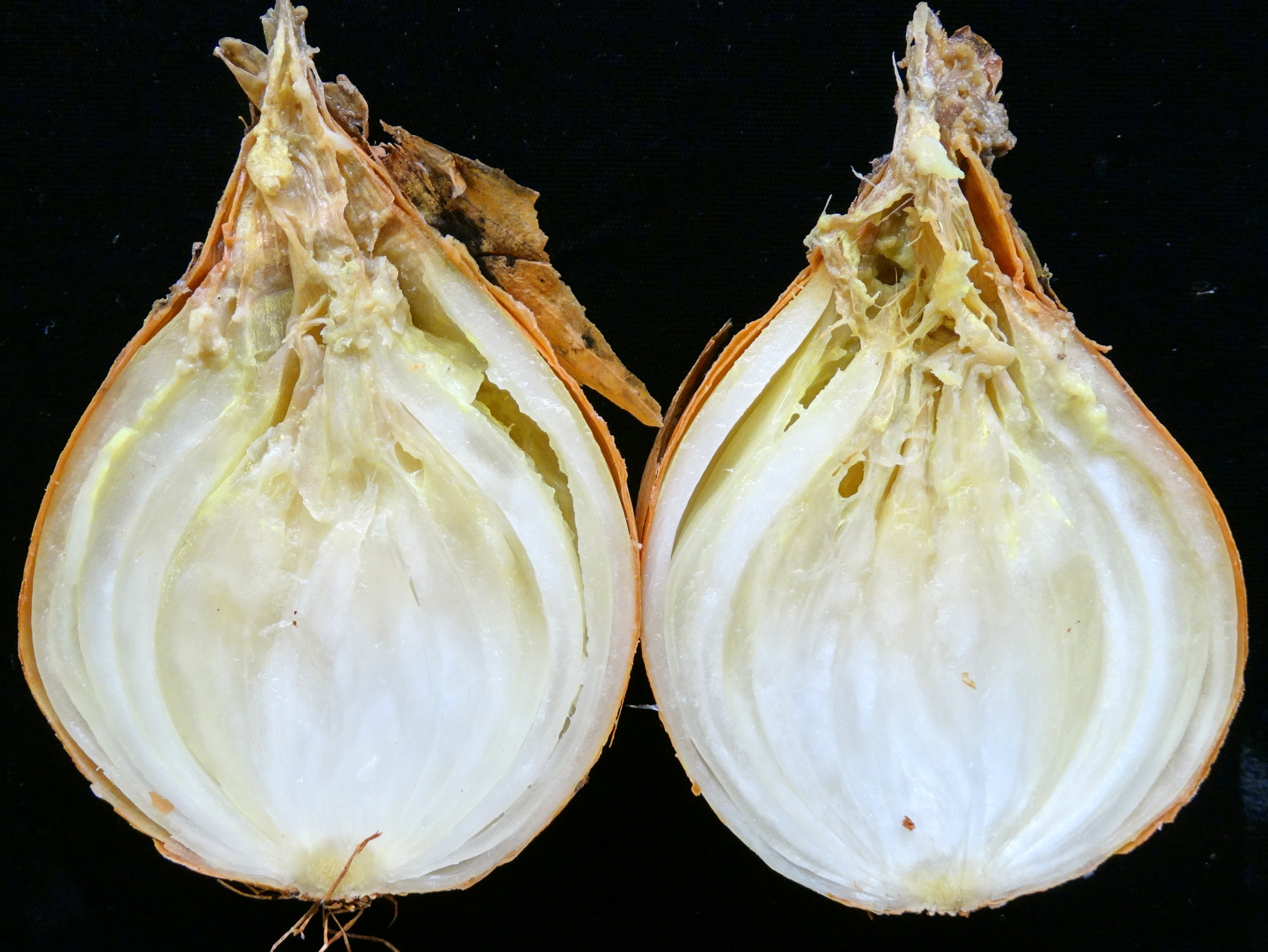
- Soft rot in an onion caused by Dickeya dadantii or Pectobacterium carotovorum

Scientific classification
- Domain: Bacteria
- Kingdom: Pseudomonadati
- Phylum: Pseudomonadota
- Class: Gammaproteobacteria
- Order: Enterobacterales
- Family: Pectobacteriaceae
- Genus: Dickeya
- Species: D. dadantii

Binomial name
- Dickeya dadantii Samson et al. 2005

= Dickeya dadantii =

Disease-causing Gram Negative Bacillus

Dickeya dadantii is a Gram-negative bacillus that belongs to the family Pectobacteriaceae. It was formerly known as Erwinia chrysanthemi but was reassigned as Dickeya dadantii in 2005. Members of this family are facultative anaerobes, able to ferment sugars to lactic acid, have nitrate reductase, but lack oxidases. Even though many clinical pathogens are part of the order Enterobacterales, most members of this family are plant pathogens. D. dadantii is a motile, non-sporing, straight rod-shaped cell with rounded ends, much like the other members of the genus, Dickeya. Cells range in size from 0.8 to 3.2 μm by 0.5 to 0.8 μm and are surrounded by numerous flagella (peritrichous).

In the natural plant environment, D. dadantii causes plant maladies such as necrosis, blight and "soft rot", which is a progressive tissue maceration. D. dadantii contains many pectinases that are able to macerate and break down the plant cell wall material. This exposed part of the plant releases nutrients that can facilitate bacterial growth. Commonly infected plants include potato tubers, bulbs of vegetables, and ornamental crops.

== Hosts ==
D. dadantii causes disease on several different ornamental and horticultural host plants throughout the world including: tropical, subtropical, and temperate climates. The host range of D. dadantii continues growing as new susceptible species are continuously being documented. It has also been found in soils, rivers and irrigation water. Host specificity is not yet fully understood. Originally pathovar groups were documented according to the hosts from which they were isolated. Today 50+ species have been identified and more are possible if another classification system based on biovars were to be used. Disease is most often reported on bananas, carnations, and chrysanthemums, but the list of host species is quite vast. Important host families and species economically affected include:

Susceptible Families	Examples of specific species affected
Solanaceae	peppers, potato, eggplant, tomato, tobacco
Convolvulaceae	sweet potato
Brassicaceae	broccoli, radishes
Apiaceae	celery, carrot
Poaceae	sugar cane, sorghum, rice
Bromeliaceae	pineapple, urn plant
Asparagaceae	asparagus
Amaryllidaceae	onions

There are also many significant hosts for D. dadantii present in ornamental and floriculture industries, with the families including:

Susceptible Families	Examples of specific species affected
Orchidaceae	orchids
Liliaceae	tulips
Asteraceae	chickory, chrysanthemums
Caryophyllaceae	carnations
Asparagaceae	hyacinths, dracaena
Crassulaceae	kalanchoe, sedums
Amaryllidaceae	amaryllis
Begoniaceae	begonia

Note: the plant families listed above show examples of some specific species infected within each family, not to say D. dadantii has the ability to infect every species within a family.

== Symptoms ==
D. dadantii is phytopathogenic bacterium causing soft rot diseases on many host plants including some which are economically important. D. dadantii, more commonly known as: soft rot, brown rot or blackleg, causes characteristic symptoms associated with other bacterial wilts, causing final diagnosis to be difficult. The pathogen primarily seeks to attack the plant's xylem vessels located in leaves, stems, blossoms and storage organs of herbaceous plants. D. dadantii is able to infect hosts at any point in its life cycle. In addition to symptoms of wilt, the disease appears as sunken and cracked external lesions also having a brown interior in cross section in subterranean bulbs and tubers Diseased plants will display a variety of symptoms including: wilting, stunting and vascular discoloration of the stems. Early symptoms include water soaked lesions at the site of infection, gradually expanding chlorotic leaves and loss of turgor in tissues. The intensity of D. dadantii colonization relates to the amount of disease and degree of damage. The pathogen is very successful at infiltrating host tissues due to the many pectinases responsible for disassembly of plant cell wall polysaccharides. Once the cell wall is degraded cellular structure collapses and this cell maceration gives a characteristic "water-soaked" or rotted appearance. D. dadantii grow intercellularly, continuing to degrade cells and colonize, until it eventually reaches xylem tissues. Upon reaching the xylem vessels D. dadantii possesses the ability to spread to new regions of the host and other areas may begin to display symptoms. Colonization within the xylem restricts flow of water causing loss of turgor pressure and wilting of foliage and stems. Restricted movement of important plant compounds eventually lead to death of the host.

== Disease cycle ==
D. dadantii is able to infect the fleshy, succulent plant parts, such as tubers, rhizomes, stems and leaves, causing localized symptoms. As discussed in the symptoms section, it is also capable of infecting the xylem, resulting in a systemic infection that causes wilting. D. dadantii typically originates from infected insects, vegetables or host plant residues. However, the bacteria are also able to survive in soils and other plants without infection. The ability of D. dadantii to live in the soil as a plant pathogen is regulated by virulence genes in response to environmental factors that control whether the bacterium is saprophytic or pathogenic. When D. dadantii is virulent it enters primarily through hydathodes and wounds, with the assistance of jasmonates, where the bacteria rapidly breakdown the parenchymatous tissues with the use of pectic enzymes. D. dadantii produces many pectinases that are responsible for disassembly of the plant cell wall. After the cell wall is degraded, and the contents of the cell are accessed, D. dadantii catabolizes glucose by a fermentation pathway. After the plant has been accessed, colonization is a complicated process that requires many additional factors for successful infection. These factors include: "cellulases, iron assimilation, a Hrp type III secretion system, exopolysaccharides, motility, and proteins involved in resistance against plant defense mechanisms". The plant attempts to resist the infection with different defense mechanisms and D. dadantii must overcome obstacles, such as defense barriers, secondary metabolites and toxic materials. An example of a plant defense mechanism is to produce a defensive barrier, such as a cork layer. However, when the infection is spread by larvae, the cork layer is eaten as quickly as it is made by the plant. Consequently, the protective cork layer is an ineffective protection mechanism. The bacteria continue to spread and multiply throughout the plant, moving in the intercellular spaces, within collapsed cells and the xylem. As the bacteria grow in numbers, additional hosts are infected through the spread of bacteria by: splashing water from infected plants, insects, and cultural practices including the use of contaminated tools, gloves and machinery and improper storage of cultivated crops or seeds. D. dadantii can be a problem year round, given the right environmental conditions exist. It is able to infect plants in greenhouses, indoor interiorscapes and tropical areas where temperatures and humidity remains high. At higher latitudes, infections are mainly during the hot and humid summer months.

== Environment ==
D. dadantii is a pathogen that is spread through water with the splashing of water from infected plants or recycled irrigation water, insects and cultural practices, such as using contaminated tools and machinery or improper storage of vegetables or seeds with infected substances. Insects are an important vector for movement of the pathogen. Insects are able to carry the bacteria externally and internally and are normally unharmed by the bacteria. However, there is continued research in the area of D. dadantii as an insect pathogen to aphids. The pea aphid is able to contract the pathogen from an infected plant and is destroyed in a mode of action similar to Bacillus thuringiensis by producing cyt-like entomotoxins that cause sepsis. The most important factor to disease development is environmental factors consisting of high humidity and temperatures of 71° to 93 °F (22° to 34 °C). In greenhouses, D. dadantii can survive in potting media with or without a host plant for a year or more and in the leaves of host or nonhost plants for 5 to 6 months. It is unable to be pathogenic below 20 °C (68 °F).

== Management ==
D. dadantii is a member within the genus that is able to produce the pigment indigoidine. Rapid identification of this species utilizes this water-insoluble blue pigment appearing in the bacterial colonies as a chemotaxonomic trait. The presence of a soft rot may be an indication of a bacterial disease. However, many other organisms and plant disorders may appear as various soft rot or black lesions. Proper identification is important for treatment and control measures. Thus a differential media is used to culture Dickeya species and isolate or identify D. dadantii. Researchers at Fu Jen Catholic University in Taiwan developed a medium that differentiates D. dadantii from other species. This NGM medium contains nutrient agar (NA) and glycerol medium supplemented with MnCl_{2} :4H_{2}O. To make this media, mix 23 g of nutrient agar, 10 ml glycerol (1% v/v), and 0.4 g MnCl_{2}:4H_{2}O (2 mM) to 1.0 liter of water. Note the pH of this media is 6.5 and it has a light brown base color. The proper temperature for culturing D. dadantii is 28 degrees Celsius. A positive result occurs when a bacterial streak produces a brownish blue color on the agar plate. Further isolation and extraction of the indigoidine pigment is possible using the methods described by Chatterejee and Brown.

Currently there are no effective chemical controls for D. dadantii. The most important practices involve lowering the prevalence of disease by proper sanitation of materials, exclusion of infected materials, and avoiding environments conducive to disease. Most important to disease management is exclusion because D. dadantii can move through vegetatively propagated tissues asymptomatically. Therefore, it is important to have certified disease-free stock. Some promising biological control research is being done for orchid species. D. dadantii has been studied in commercially valuable Phalaenopsis orchids. Soft rot diseases caused by Dickeya spp is one of the most devastating diseases in orchid production. Orchid growers have used environmental controls to provide the optimum growth conditions for the plants while minimizing the cultivation of the pathogens. Proper control of humidity and air movement combined with clean, high quality water, in a temperature and light regulated facility are the most commonly employed methods for disease prevention. Other biological controls of D. dadantii include symbiotic fungi known as mycorrhiza and possibly transgenic proteins. Transfer of sweet pepper genes coding for ferredoxin like protein and defensin was shown to reduce D. dadantii disease in Phalaenopsis orchids under cultivation.

== Importance ==
D. dadantii has been associated with bacterial soft rot diseases of a majority of foliage plants, numerous flowering plants and many vegetables. It is a major pathogen for many economic crops such as potatoes, banana and pineapple in addition to ornamental house plants. It causes blackleg of potato.

In addition to the pathogen having important negative consequences, D. dadantii is being used for its positive contributions. Most noble of its contributions is an enzyme, asparaginase, being used in conjunction with other chemotherapeutic agents for treatment of acute lymphoblastic leukemia (ALL) and non-Hodgkin's lymphoma in patients who have had allergic reactions to E. coli derived asparaginase Elspar or pegaspargase (Oncaspar). Secondly, with a strong governmental push towards increasing renewable fuel resources, D. dadantii is being studied for its utilization in ethanol fuel production and its ability to ferment and break down cell walls and pectins as an alternative to E. coli. Although not as effective as D. dadantii, some genes from D. dadantii were added to E. coli through genetic engineering to allow for pectin degradation by E. coli.
