= Pectobacterium betavasculorum =

Scientific classification
- Domain: Bacteria
- Kingdom: Pseudomonadati
- Phylum: Pseudomonadota
- Class: Gammaproteobacteria
- Order: Enterobacterales
- Family: Pectobacteriaceae
- Genus: Pectobacterium
- Species: P. betavasculorum

Binomial name
- Pectobacterium betavasculorum Gardan et al. 2003

Species of bacterium

Pectobacterium betavasculorum is a plant pathogenic bacterium that infects beets. It can cause significant losses during sugar beet production and storage. Little is known about the epidemiology of this disease. Its type strain is CFBP 2122^{T} (=LMG 2464^{T}=NCPPB 2795^{T} =ICMP 4226^{T}).
