= Biostraticola =

Scientific classification
- Domain: Bacteria
- Kingdom: Pseudomonadati
- Phylum: Pseudomonadota
- Class: Gammaproteobacteria
- Order: Enterobacterales
- Family: Pectobacteriaceae
- Genus: Biostraticola; Verbarg et al. 2008

Type species
- Biostraticola tofi

Species
- Biostraticola tofi

Genus of bacteria

Biostraticola is a Gram-negative, rod-shaped, non-endospore-forming, facultatively anaerobic and motile genus of bacteria within the family of Pectobacteriaceae with one known species (Biostraticola tofi).
