= Blackleg (potatoes) =

Bacterial disease of potato plants

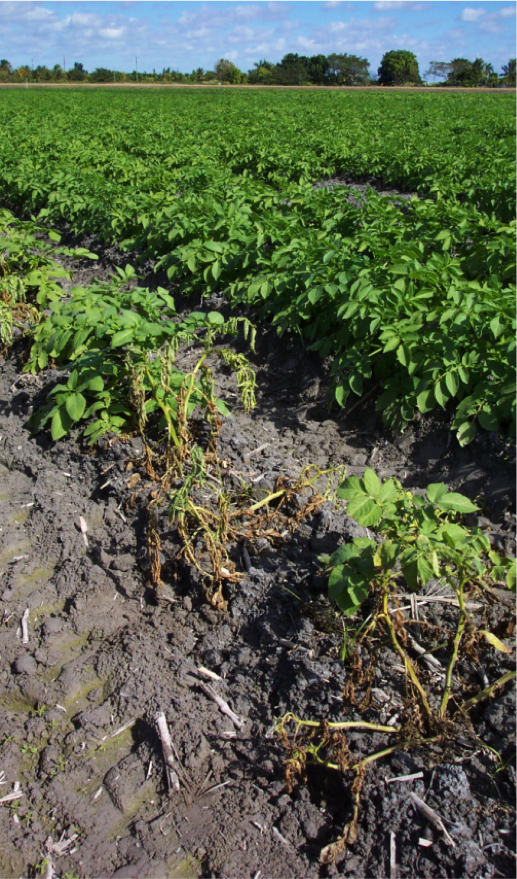
Blackleg of Potato complete plant wilt in field. These plants can sometimes be lost in the canopy.

Blackleg is a plant disease of potato caused by pectolytic bacteria that can result in stunting, wilting, chlorosis of leaves, necrosis of several tissues, a decline in yield, and at times the death of the potato plant. The term "blackleg" originates from the typical blackening and decay of the lower stem portion, or "leg", of the plant.

Blackleg in potatoes is most commonly caused by Pectobacterium atrosepticum (older synonym: Erwinia carotovora subsp. astroseptica), a gram-negative, nonsporulating, facultative anaerobe that is also associated with soft rot of potatoes. While other bacterial species such as Pectobacterium carotovorum and Dickeya dadantii can exhibit symptoms similar to blackleg of potato, these pathogens exhibit broader host ranges, are present in different climates, and typically are more associated with soft rot diseases.

== Symptoms and signs ==
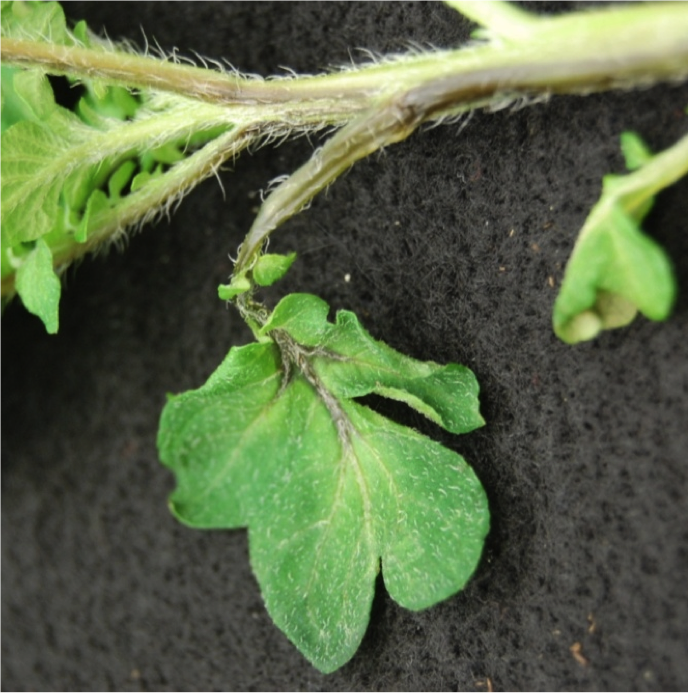
Stem discoloration and darkening

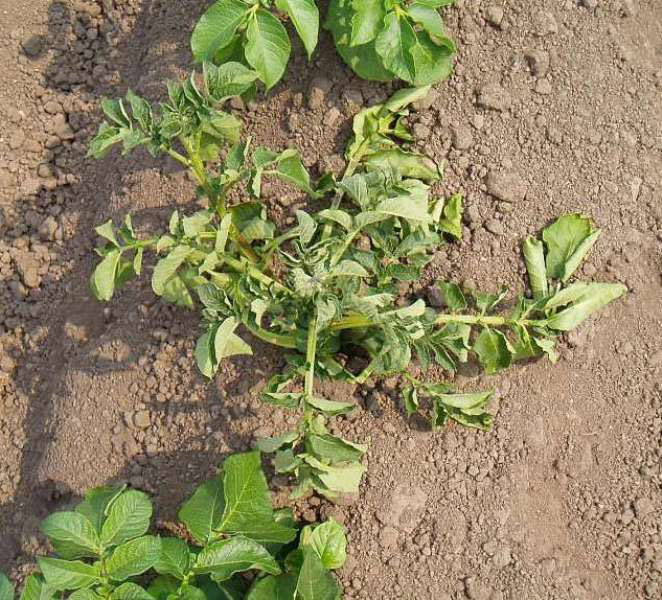
Wilting caused by blackleg

Early blackleg symptoms develop in the growing season soon after the plants emerge. They are characterized by stunted, yellowish foliage that has a stiff, upright habit. The lower part of the below ground stem of such plants is dark brown to black in color and extensively decayed. When infected, the pith region of the stem is particularly susceptible to decay and may extend upward in the stem far beyond the tissue with externally visible symptoms. Young plants affected by blackleg are particularly susceptible, typically dying after a halt in development.

Blackleg symptoms may develop in more mature plants during the later part of the growing season, and are distinguished from those that develop earlier in the season. Blackleg appears as a black discoloration of previously healthy stems, accompanied by a rapid wilting, and sometimes yellowing, of the leaves. Starting below ground, black discoloration moves up the stem, often until the entire stem is black and wilted. However, in some cases of early disease development, mature stems may turn yellow and wilt even before black decay is evident. However, after the entire stem exhibits disease symptoms, the wilted plant can be lost from view in the healthy potato plant canopy.

== Disease cycle ==
1. A contaminated tuber can infect growing stems, or move into the vascular bundles of mature stems.
2. Infected stems can be symptomatic or asymptomatic, depending on environmental conditions, although the disease will remain and spread to other tubers on the same plant through the stolons.
3. In the field or during storage, they can contaminate and infect healthy tubers through wounds introduced during harvesting or through lenticels, and may also be spread through insects, wind, and rain. An important insect vector is the seed corn maggot (Delia platura), which spreads the bacteria from diseased to healthy tissues. The bacteria are carried in the intestinal tracts of these insects, which spread the pathogen to healthy tissue by feeding on cut surfaces of healthy seed tissue. Another insect vector is the fruit fly (Drosophila melanogaster).
4. The pathogen will often survive in the infected tubers until the following planting season.

== Environment and biology ==
The pathogen P. atrosepticum thrives in moist, cool conditions, typically causing symptoms at temperatures below 25 °C (77 °F). It is vulnerable to temperatures above 36 °C (97 °F) and dry conditions, and thus survives best in potato tuber tissues, although it is known to survive in other plant tissues. Unlike other pectolytic bacteria, evidence shows that P. atrosepticum does not survive well in soil outside its host tissue.

Disease symptoms are not necessarily uniformly exhibited from both shoots originating from a single tuber or in a field infested with P. atrosepticum. Additionally, presence of P. atrosepticum in the soil is not necessarily associated with disease symptoms. This is partly explained by the narrow environmental conditions needed for pathogenicity, although new findings in research are showing strong evidence of density dependent quorum sensing signals used by P. atrosepticum in exhibiting virulence.

== Management ==
=== Cultural ===
Blackleg of potato has been successfully managed primarily using cultural techniques. These techniques generally rely on sterile propagation techniques, using knowledge P. atrosepticum's narrow environmental range to control planting timing, removing infected tissues and plants during the growing season, reducing tuber harvest damage, and proper storage. See the sections below for more details.

==== Sterile propagation ====
Given that tubers are the primary mechanism by which P. atrosepticum survives and spreads, clean seed potato stocks established using tissue cultures have been very successful in breaking the cycle of carrying disease forward from year to year. Buildup of tuber contamination is limited by reducing the number of field generations of these seed potatoes to 5 to 7 years. Some methods of sterile propagation include planting only healthy, whole seed potatoes. If healthy seed potatoes are to be cut, they should be first warmed to 12–15 °C (54–59 °F), cut, stored for 2 days at 12–15 °C (54–59 °F) in a humid environment with good air flow. This warming and storing period ensures proper suberization of the tissue, which forms a barrier from P. atrosepticum infestation.

==== Planting conditions ====
Given that P. atrosepticum thrives in cool, moist conditions, planting seed potatoes in well-drained soil after soil temperatures have increased well above 10 °C (50 °F) is very important to halting the onset of the disease early in the plant life cycle, when the plant is more susceptible to the worst effects of the disease.

==== Nutrition ====
Increasing application of nitrogen or complete fertilizers have shown reduced incidence of blackleg stem infection.

==== During the growing season ====
Although there is a risk of spreading the disease pathogen through injury of healthy plants, if proper techniques are followed, rogueing out all parts of the blackleg-diseased plants can be a useful way to reduce soil inoculum.

Research is being conducted by the Haute École d'ingénierie et d'architecture de Fribourg in collaboration with the Centre hospitalier universitaire vaudois (CHUV) in order to combat black leg using bacteriophages.

==== At harvest and during storage ====
Given that P. atrosepticum survives best in the tubers and additionally contributes to soft rot, it is critically important to reduce spread of the pathogen by removing tubers exhibiting soft rot decay before they are spread over grading lines and bin pilers for storage. Reducing post-harvest wounding is also important, especially for seed potatoes. Additionally, it is critically important to keep the potatoes at a low temperature with adequate aeration and humidity control in order to minimize development of the pathogen in infested stocks.

=== Biocontrol and plant resistance ===
New research on P. atrosepticum virulence pathways has elucidated the use of quorum sensing molecules to exhibit pathogenicity. These pathways include the control of the production of plant cell wall degrading enzymes in addition to other virulence factors. Research indicating the role of other soil microbes in degrading P. atrosepticum quorum sensing communication molecules provides the possibility for safe and effective control of the disease.

Plant defense mechanism studies on P. atrosepticum, used to better understand disease resistance, have focused more on the soft-rot symptoms that can sometimes be associated with P. atrosepticum. However, research is successfully identifying the quantity and type of plant resistance molecules that are produced in response to pathogen associated molecular patterns (PAMPs), and their effects on the activity and virulence of pathogens such as P. atrosepticum.

== Importance ==
=== History ===
The symptoms of Blackleg of Potato were first described in Germany between 1878 and 1900, but the descriptions were incomplete and cannot definitively be linked to the particular disease. The first complete descriptions of Blackleg in potatoes were formed between 1901 and 1917 by several different scientists. These descriptions consisted of many different names, such as Bacillus phytophthorus, Bacillus omnivorus, Bacillus oleraceae, Bacillus atrosepticus, Bacillus aroideae, Bacillus solanisaprus, and Bacillus melanogenes. Investigations between 1918 and 1958 confirmed that these bacteria were of a single species, and were officially appointed the name Pectobacterium carotovorum. A variety of Pectobacterium (P. carotovorum var. atrosepticum, which includes B. melanogenes and B. phytophthorus) can be differentiated from the rest, although it is considered the same species of bacteria.

Although it was an important disease historically, Blackleg of potato is less of an issue today due to very successful results from changes in cultural practices regarding seed potato certification programs. As a major problem in wet, cool seasons and irrigated fields, historically it has more heavily impacted northern U.S. states with climates amenable to disease development, with disease incidence levels as high as 10%. In places like Scotland, it historically has had disease incidence levels of up to 30%. Victoria, Australia also had issues with this disease in the past. In terms of the impact of the disease on yields, one past study indicated that for every 1% increase in disease incidence, yields generally trended down at 0.8%.

=== Resistance ===
Given the success with cultural control practices in managing the disease, cultivars resistance is better characterized in the U.S. by susceptible varieties. Washington State University, which has posted a large comprehensive list of potato cultivars available in North America, only calls out two blackleg susceptible varieties: Monona and Superior.

In the U.K., and more specifically in Scotland, where the disease has been an issue, they better characterize blackleg-resistant varieties. Varieties with resistance values of 6–9 on a scale of 1-9 include Avondale, Axona, Bonnie, Cara, Emma, Isle Of Jura, Orla, Osprey, Sarpo Mira, Saxon, Sebastian, Vales Sovereign.
