= Agnocoris rubicundus =

Scientific classification
- Kingdom: Animalia
- Phylum: Arthropoda
- Class: Insecta
- Order: Hemiptera
- Suborder: Heteroptera
- Family: Miridae
- Tribe: Mirini
- Genus: Agnocoris
- Species: A. rubicundus

Binomial name
- Agnocoris rubicundus (Fallén, 1807)

Synonyms
- Lygaeus rubicundus Fallén, 1807

Species of true bug

Agnocoris rubicundus is a species of plant bug in the family Miridae. It is found in Europe and Northern Asia (excluding China) and North America.
