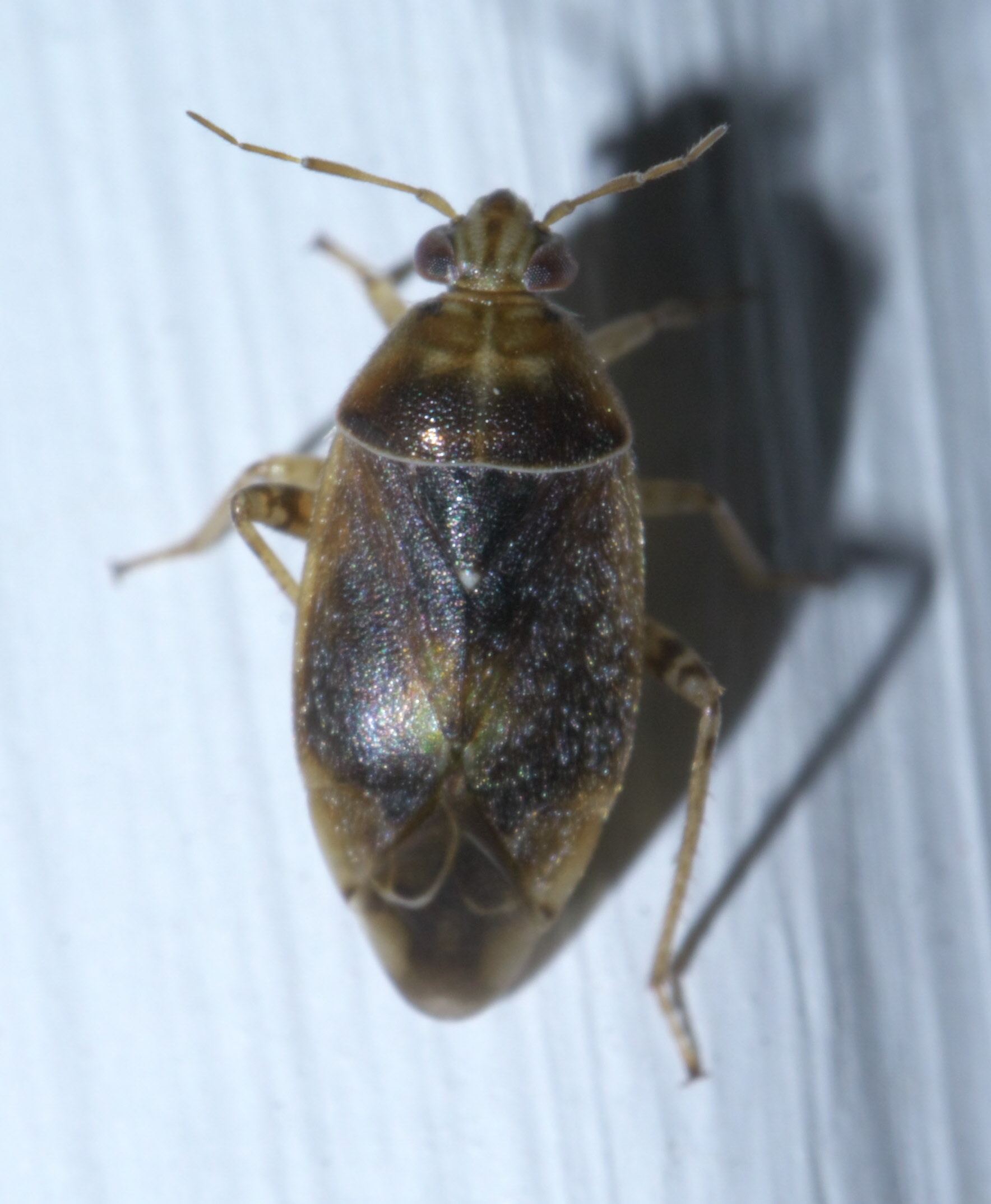
- Agnocoris pulverulentus

Scientific classification
- Kingdom: Animalia
- Phylum: Arthropoda
- Class: Insecta
- Order: Hemiptera
- Suborder: Heteroptera
- Family: Miridae
- Tribe: Mirini
- Genus: Agnocoris
- Species: A. pulverulentus

Binomial name
- Agnocoris pulverulentus (Uhler, 1892)

= Agnocoris pulverulentus =

Species of true bug

Agnocoris pulverulentus is a species of plant bug in the family Miridae. It is found in North America.
