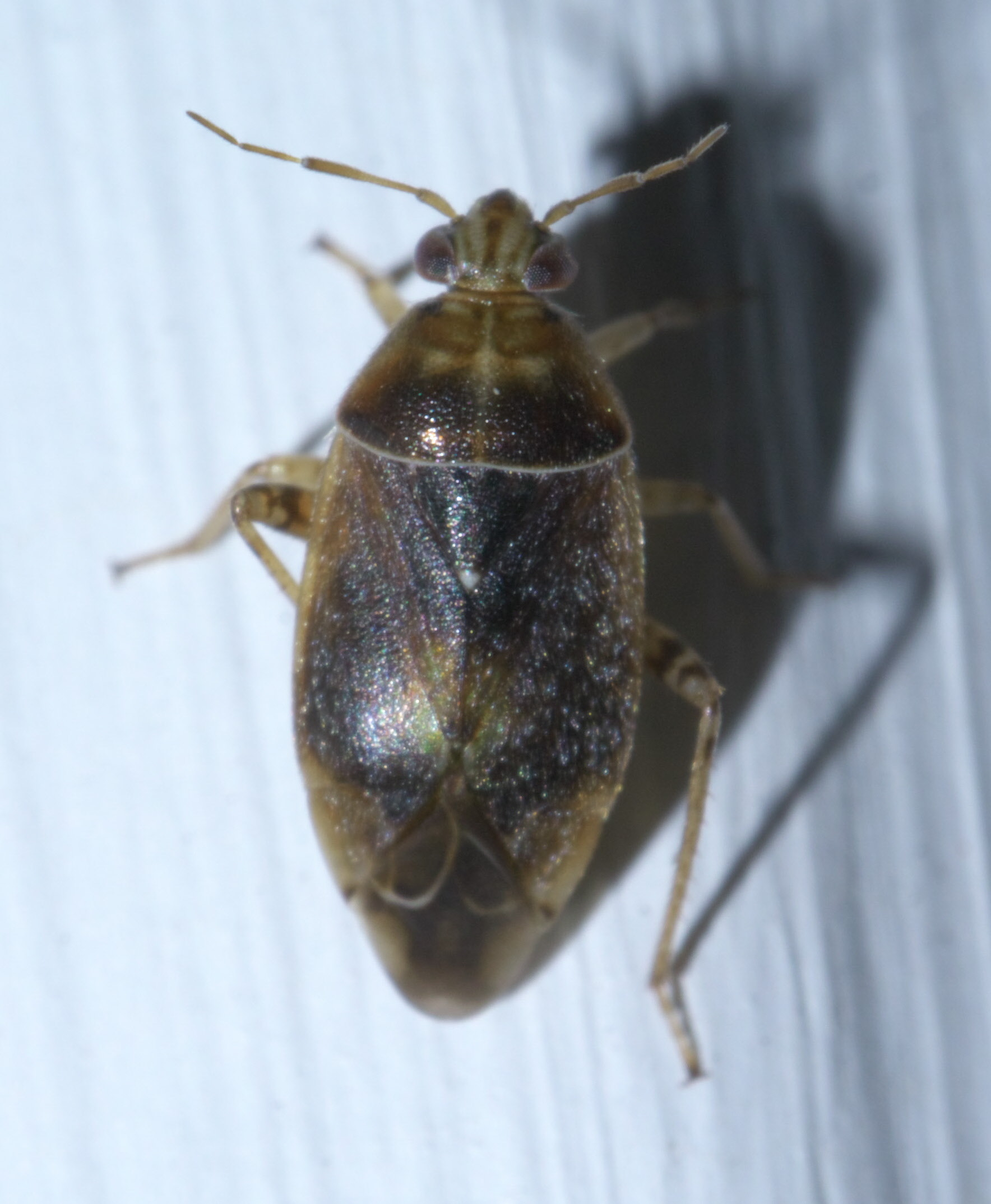

Scientific classification
- Kingdom: Animalia
- Phylum: Arthropoda
- Clade: Pancrustacea
- Class: Insecta
- Order: Hemiptera
- Suborder: Heteroptera
- Family: Miridae
- Tribe: Mirini
- Genus: Agnocoris; Reuter, 1875

= Agnocoris =

Genus of true bugs

Agnocoris is a genus of plant bugs in the family Miridae. There are about seven described species in Agnocoris.

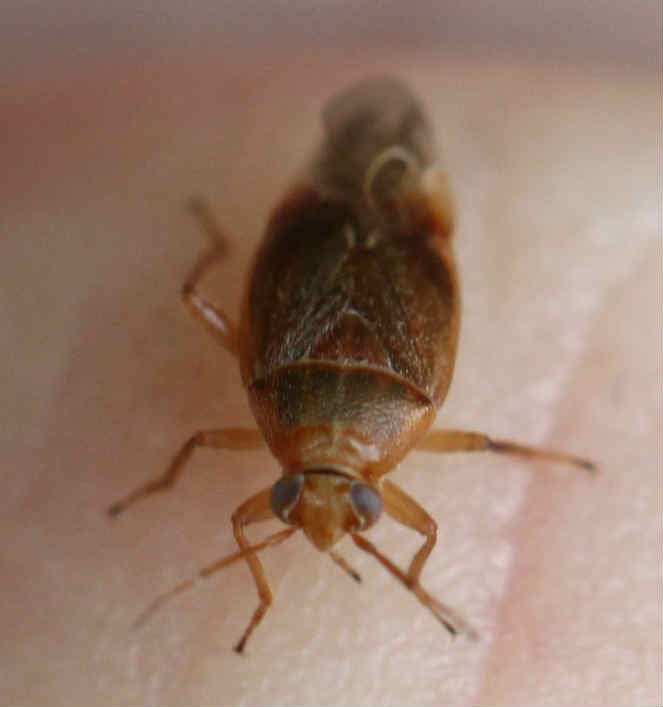
Agnocoris reclairei

== Species ==
These seven species belong to the genus Agnocoris:

- Agnocoris eduardi Ribes, 1977
- Agnocoris lineata (Distant, 1893)
- Agnocoris pulverulentus (Uhler, 1892)
- Agnocoris reclairei (Wagner, 1949)
- Agnocoris rossi Moore, 1955
- Agnocoris rubicundus (Fallén, 1807)
- Agnocoris utahensis Moore, 1955
