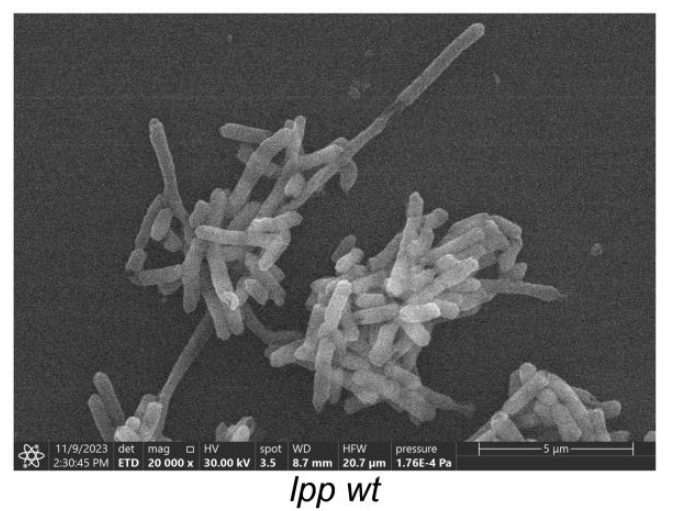
- Dickeya dadantii

Scientific classification
- Domain: Bacteria
- Kingdom: Pseudomonadati
- Phylum: Pseudomonadota
- Class: Gammaproteobacteria
- Order: Enterobacterales
- Family: Pectobacteriaceae
- Genus: Dickeya; Samson et al., 2005

Species
- Several, see text

= Dickeya =

Genus of bacteria

Dickeya is a genus of the family Pectobacteriaceae that consists mainly of pathogens from herbaceous plants. Dickeya is the result of the reclassification of 75 strains of Pectobacterium chrysanthemi, as well as Brenneria paradisiaca CFBP 4178, into a new genus. The genus is named for American phytopathologist Robert S. Dickey. Several species in this genus, such as Dickeya dadantii, are known phytopathogens.

Species now placed here include:

- Dickeya aquatica
- Dickeya chrysanthemi
- Dickeya dadantii subsp. dadantii
- Dickeya dadantii subsp. dianthicola
- Dickeya fangzhongdai
- Dickeya lacustris
- Dickeya oryzae
- Dickeya paradisiaca
- Dickeya parazeae
- Dickeya poaceiphila
- Dickeya solani
- Dickeya undicola
- Dickeya zeae
