= Asparaginase =

Enzyme used as medication and in food manufacturing

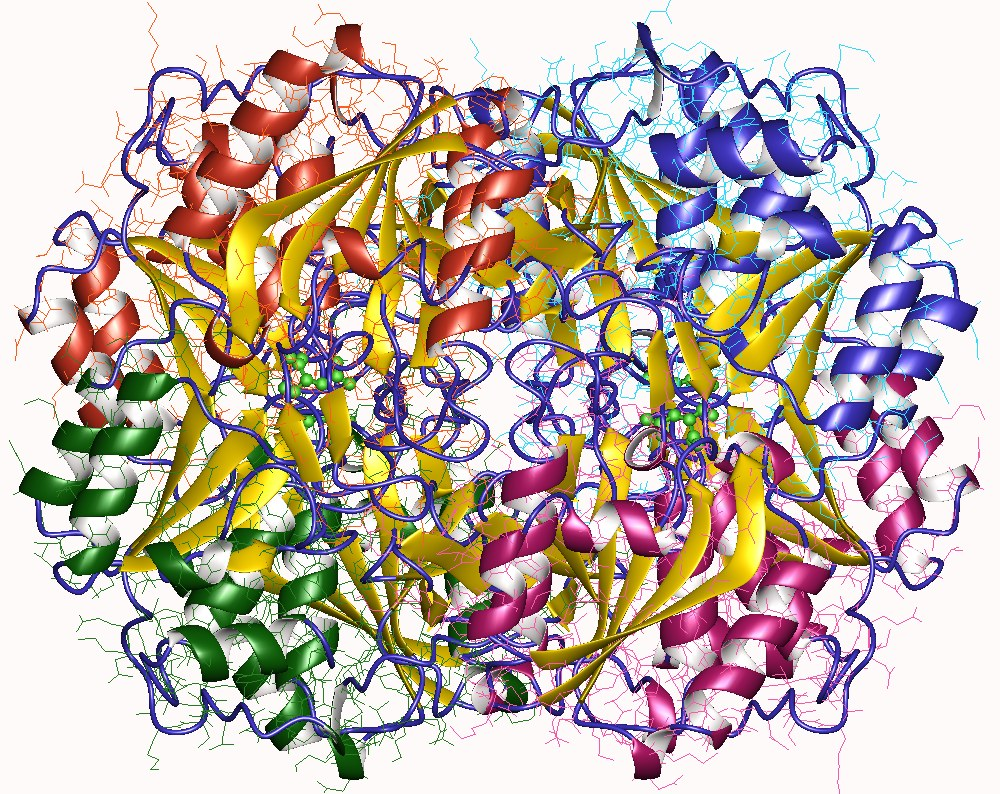

Clinical data
- Trade names: Elspar, Leunase, Rylaze, Spectrila, others
- Other names: crisantaspase, colaspase, asparaginase erwinia chrysanthemi (recombinant)-rywn
- AHFS/Drugs.com: Monograph
- MedlinePlus: a682046
- License data: EU EMA: by INN; US DailyMed: Asparaginase
- Pregnancy category: AU: D
- Routes of administration: Intramuscular, intravenous
- Drug class: Antineoplastic
- ATC code: L01XX02 (WHO)

Legal status
- Legal status: AU: S4 (Prescription only); CA: ℞-only; UK: POM (Prescription only); US: ℞-only; EU: Rx-only; In general: ℞ (Prescription only)

Pharmacokinetic data
- Elimination half-life: 39-49 hours (IM), 8-30 hours (IV)

Identifiers
- IUPAC name: E. coli L-asparagine amidohydrolase
- CAS Number: 9015-68-3
- IUPHAR/BPS: 7347
- DrugBank: DB00023
- ChemSpider: none
- UNII: G4FQ3CKY5R
- KEGG: D02997
- CompTox Dashboard (EPA): DTXSID9037666
- ECHA InfoCard: 100.029.774

Chemical and physical data
- Formula: C_{1377}H_{2208}N_{382}O_{442}S_{17}
- Molar mass: 31732.06 g·mol^{−1}

Asparaginase is an enzyme that is used as a medication and in food manufacturing. As a medication, L-asparaginase is used to treat acute lymphoblastic leukemia (ALL) and lymphoblastic lymphoma (LBL). It is given by injection into a vein, or muscle. A PEGylated version, pegaspargase, is also available. In food manufacturing it is used to decrease acrylamide.

Common side effects when used by injection include allergic reactions, pancreatitis, blood clotting problems, high blood sugar, kidney problems, and liver dysfunction. Use in pregnancy may harm the baby. As a food it is generally recognized as safe. Asparaginase works by breaking down the amino acid known as asparagine without which the cancer cells cannot make protein.

Asparaginase was approved for medical use in the United States in 1978. It is on the World Health Organization's List of Essential Medicines. It is often made from Escherichia coli (E. coli) or Erwinia chrysanthemi.

== Development of the drug ==
In 1963, asparaginase (ASNase) was identified as an effective antileukemic agent, and subsequent efforts were made to isolate it from bacterial sources and scale up production for clinical trials. Clinical testing with bacterial-derived ASNase commenced in 1966, and in 1978, E. coli–derived ASNase received approval from the United States for the treatment of acute lymphoblastic leukemia. Subsequently, pegylated E. coli ASNase was approved in 1994 as a second-line treatment and later in 2006 as a first-line treatment for acute lymphoblastic leukemia. Another ASNase variant, ASNase Erwinia chrysantemi, obtained authorization for use in the United Kingdom in 1985, and gained approval from the US Food and Drug Administration in 2011.

== Uses ==
Asparaginases are primarily used as pharmaceuticals and as industrial food processing agents.

=== Medical ===
E. coli strains are the main source of medical asparaginase. Branded formulations (with different chemical and pharmacological properties) available in 1998 include Asparaginase Medac, Ciderolase, and Oncaspar. (Crasnitin has been discontinued.) Spectrila is a recombinant E. coli asparaginase.

Asparaginase produced by Dickeya dadantii (formerly called Erwinia chrysanthemi) instead is known as crisantaspase (BAN), and is available in the United Kingdom under the brand name Erwinase.

One of the E. coli asparaginases marketed under the brand name Elspar for the treatment of acute lymphoblastic leukemia is also used in some mast cell tumor protocols.

In July 2006, the US Food and Drug Administration (FDA) granted approval to pegaspargase for the first-line treatment of people with acute lymphoblastic leukemia as a component of a multiagent chemotherapy regimen. Pegaspargase was previously approved in February 1994 for the treatment of patients with acute lymphoblastic leukemia who were hypersensitive to native forms of L-asparaginase. Similar designations were later applied to calaspargase (December 2018) and asparaginase erwinia chrysanthemi (June 2021), both identified as orphan drugs.

=== As a food processing aid ===
Acrylamide is often formed in the cooking of starchy foods. During heating, asparagine undergoes the Maillard reaction, giving baked or fried foods their brown color and toasted flavor, but also producing carcinogens such as acrylamide. Addition of asparaginase before cooking destroys asparagine so that the formation of acrylamide is significantly reduced.

=== As a drug ===
Applications of asparaginase in cancer therapy take advantage of the fact that acute lymphoblastic leukemia cells and some other suspected tumor cells are unable to synthesize the non-essential amino acid asparagine, whereas normal cells are able to make their own asparagine; thus leukemic cells require a high amount of asparagine. These leukemic cells depend on circulating asparagine. Asparaginase, however, catalyzes the conversion of L-asparagine to aspartic acid and ammonia. This deprives the leukemic cell of circulating asparagine, which leads to cell death.

== Side effects ==
The main side effect is an allergic or hypersensitivity reaction; anaphylaxis is a possibility. Additionally, it can also be associated with a coagulopathy as it decreases protein synthesis, including synthesis of coagulation factors (e.g. progressive isolated decrease of fibrinogen) and anticoagulant factor (generally antithrombin III; sometimes protein C and S as well), leading to bleeding or thrombotic events such as stroke. Bone marrow suppression is common but only mild to moderate, rarely reaches clinical significance and therapeutic consequences are rarely required.

The most common nonhematological adverse reactions of asparaginase erwinia chrysanthemi (recombinant) include abnormal liver test, nausea, musculoskeletal pain, infection, fatigue, headache, febrile neutropenia, pyrexia, hemorrhage (bleeding), stomatitis, abdominal pain, decreased appetite, drug hypersensitivity, hyperglycemia, diarrhea, pancreatitis, and hypokalemia. The most common side effects of asparaginase erwinia chrysanthemi (recombinant) when given in combination with chemotherapy for the treatment of acute lymphoblastic leukemia and lymphoblastic lymphoma are abnormal liver tests, nausea, muscle and bone pain, and fatigue.

== History ==
The discovery and development of asparaginase as an anti-cancer drug began in 1953, when scientists first observed that lymphomas in rat and mice regressed after treatment with guinea pig serum. Later it was found out that it is not the serum itself which provoke the tumour regression, but rather the enzyme asparaginase.

After researchers comparing different kinds of asparaginases, the one derived from Escherichia coli and Erwinia chrysanthemi turned out to have the best anti-cancer ability. E. coli has thereby become the main source of asparaginase due to the factor that it is also easy to produce in large amounts.

== Names and synonyms ==
Crisantaspase is the British Approved Name (BAN) for asparaginase obtained from Erwinia chrysanthemi. Colaspase is the BAN of asparaginase obtained from Escherichia coli. The United States Adopted Name of crisantaspase is asparaginase Erwinia chrysanthemi. Elspar, Kidrolase, Leunase and Spectrila are brand names for colaspase, while Erwinase and Erwinaze are brand names for crisantaspase. Oncaspar is the brand name of pegaspargase.
