= Pegaspargase =

Pharmaceutical drug

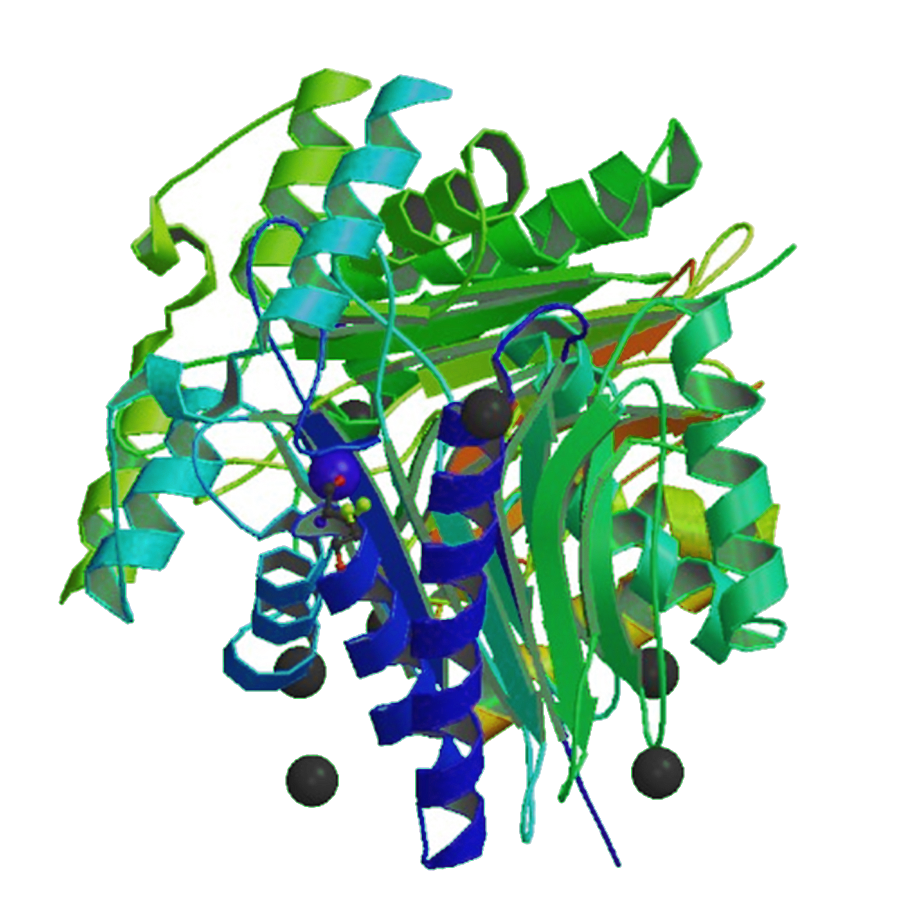

Clinical data
- Pronunciation: /pəˈɡæspərɡeɪz/
- Trade names: Oncaspar
- AHFS/Drugs.com: Monograph
- MedlinePlus: a695031
- License data: US DailyMed: Pegaspargase
- Pregnancy category: AU: D
- Routes of administration: Intramuscular, intravenous
- ATC code: L01XX24 (WHO)

Legal status
- Legal status: AU: S4 (Prescription only); CA: ℞-only; US: ℞-only; EU: Rx-only

Identifiers
- IUPAC name: Pegylated E. coli L-asparagine amidohydrolase
- CAS Number: 130167-69-0
- DrugBank: DB00059
- ChemSpider: none
- UNII: 7D96IR0PPM
- KEGG: D05387
- ChEMBL: ChEMBL2108546

Chemical and physical data
- Formula: C_{1377}H_{2208}N_{382}O_{442}S_{17}
- Molar mass: 31732.06 g·mol^{−1}

Pegaspargase, sold under the brand name Oncaspar, is a medication used in the treatment of acute lymphoblastic leukemia (ALL). Often it is used together with anthracycline, vincristine, and corticosteroids (for example prednisone and dexamethasone). Pegaspargase can be administered either via an intravenous infusion or a intramuscular injection.

Known side effects include allergic reactions, coagulopathy, high blood sugar, affecting liver function, pancreas inflammation, and blood clots in the brain. There is no data regarding the usage of pegaspargase during pregnancy. Therefore, caution should be observed and pegaspargase should only be used during pregnancy when the benefits outweigh the possible risks.

Pegaspargase is a modified version of the enzyme asparaginase which has undergone PEGylation. It works by breaking down the amino acid asparagine that are circulating in the bloodstream. The circulating asparagine is essential for the cancer cells to enable growth since they can't produce their own, in contrast to normal cells. The normal cells are therefore less affected by pegaspargase.

Pegaspargase was approved for medical use in the United States in 1994. It is on the World Health Organization's List of Essential Medicines. It is made by Sigma-Tau.
