= Pectobacterium atrosepticum =

Scientific classification
- Domain: Bacteria
- Kingdom: Pseudomonadati
- Phylum: Pseudomonadota
- Class: Gammaproteobacteria
- Order: Enterobacterales
- Family: Pectobacteriaceae
- Genus: Pectobacterium
- Species: P. atrosepticum

Binomial name
- Pectobacterium atrosepticum (van Hall, 1902) Gardan et al., 2003

Species of bacterium

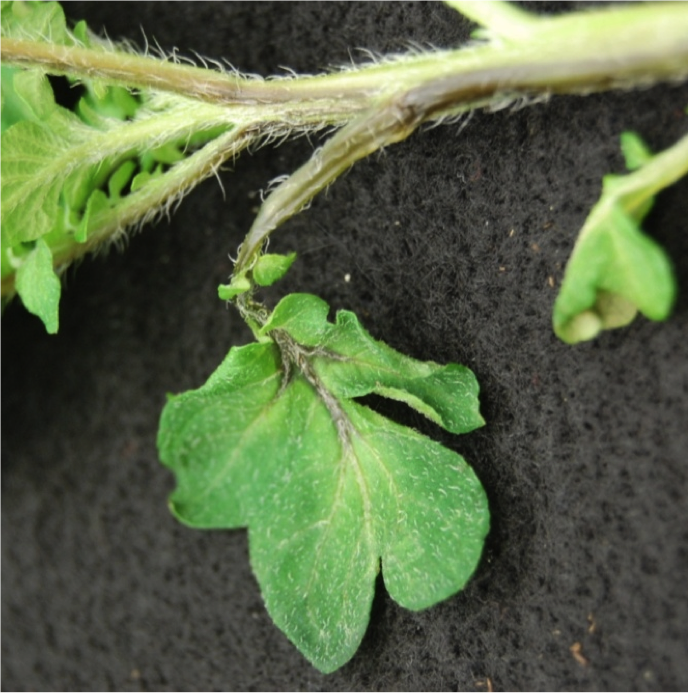
Blackleg of potato symptoms showing darkened stem and leaf wilt on potato caused by the plant pathogen

Pectobacterium atrosepticum is a species of bacterium. It is a plant pathogen causing blackleg of potato. Its type strain is CFBP 1526^{T} (=LMG 2386^{T} =NCPPB 549^{T} =ICMP 1526^{T}). Its genome has been sequenced.
