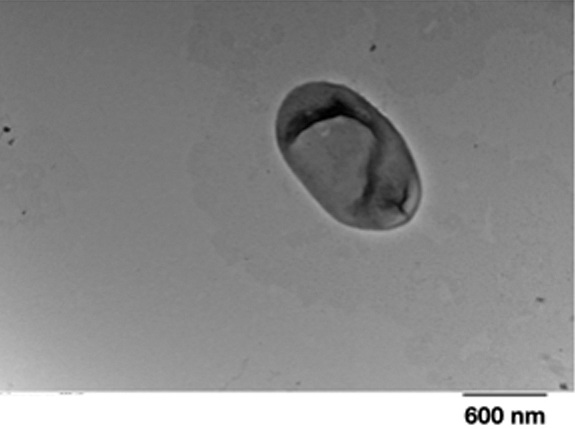
- Brenneria ulupoensis

Scientific classification
- Domain: Bacteria
- Kingdom: Pseudomonadati
- Phylum: Pseudomonadota
- Class: Gammaproteobacteria
- Order: Enterobacterales
- Family: Pectobacteriaceae
- Genus: Brenneria

Species
- See text.

= Brenneria =

Genus of bacteria

Brenneria is a genus of Pectobacteriaceae, containing mostly pathogens of woody plants. This genus is named after the microbiologist Don J. Brenner.

Some members of this genus were formerly placed in Erwinia.

== Species ==
Species now placed in Brenneria include:

- Brenneria alni
- Brenneria corticis
- Brenneria goodwinii
- Brenneria nigrifluens
- Brenneria populi
- Brenneria roseae
  - subsp. americana
  - subsp. roseae
- Brenneria rubrifaciens
- Brenneria salicis

== Plant disease ==
=== Plant diseases and host ===
Brenneria rubrifaciens (deep bark canker) - Walnut (Juglans regia)

Brenneria goodwinii (Acute Oak Decline) - Oak (Quercus robur)

Brenneria salicis (Watermark disease) - Willow (Salix spp.)

Brenneria alni (bark canker) - Alder (Alnus spp.)

Brenneria nigrifluens (shallow bark canker) - Walnut (Juglans regia)

Brenneria populi (bark canker) - Poplar (Populus x euramericana)

Brenneria corticis (bark canker) - Poplar (Populus x euramericana)

Brenneria roseae subsp. roseae - possibly involved in Acute Oak Decline in the UK - Oak (Quercus cerris)

Brenneria roseae subsp. americana - possibly involved in Acute Oak Decline in the USA - Oak (Quercus kelloggii)
