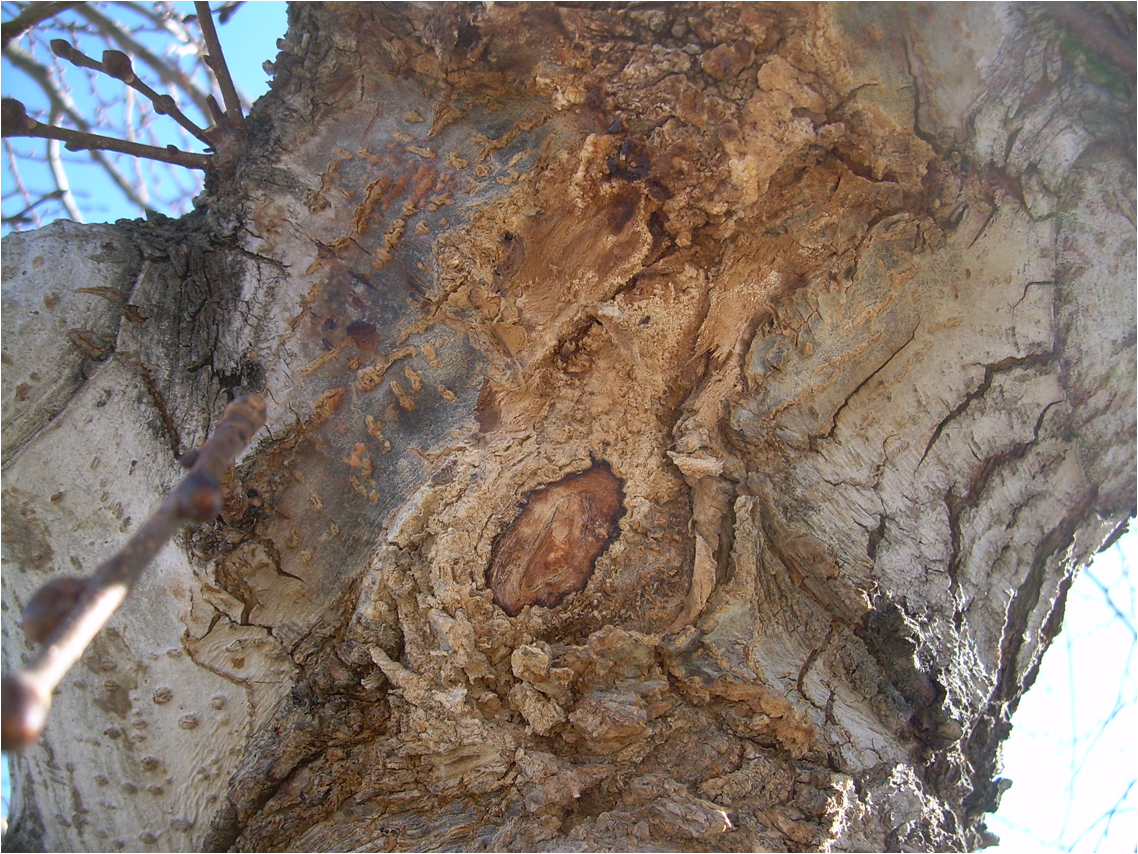
- Slime flux on a Camperdown Elm caused by Pectobacterium carotovorum

Scientific classification
- Domain: Bacteria
- Kingdom: Pseudomonadati
- Phylum: Pseudomonadota
- Class: Gammaproteobacteria
- Order: Enterobacterales
- Family: Pectobacteriaceae
- Genus: Pectobacterium; Hauben et al. 1998

Species
- Pectobacterium aroidearum Pectobacterium atrosepticum Pectobacterium betavasculorum Pectobacterium cacticida Pectobacterium carnegieana Pectobacterium carotovorum Pectobacterium cypripedii Pectobacterium rhapontici Pectobacterium wasabiae

= Pectobacterium =

Genus of bacteria

Pectobacterium is a bacterial genus of the family Pectobacteriaceae; it used to be a member of the genus Erwinia, which was split into three genera: Erwinia, Pectobacterium, and Brenneria.

Species include P. atrosepticum, P. betavasculorum, P. carotovorum, and P. wasabiae.
