= Pectin lyase =

Enzyme

pectin lyase

Identifiers
- EC no.: 4.2.2.10
- CAS no.: 9033-35-6

Databases
- IntEnz: IntEnz view
- BRENDA: BRENDA entry
- ExPASy: NiceZyme view
- KEGG: KEGG entry
- MetaCyc: metabolic pathway
- PRIAM: profile
- PDB structures: RCSB PDB PDBe PDBsum
- Gene Ontology: AmiGO / QuickGO
Search
- PMC: articles
- PubMed: articles
- NCBI: proteins

Pectin lyase is a polysaccharide enzyme with a complex structure that is present in plant cell walls. It has a significant role in pectin degradation and different biotechnological and industrial applications. It can be found in many different organisms.

== EC number ==
The Pectin lyase is an enzyme whose EC number is (EC4.2.2.10). It is a numerical classification system for enzymes based on their catalyzed chemical reactions.

== Pectin pathway ==
Pectin lyase is a component that is found in plant cell walls. This enzyme creates unsaturated products by breaking the glycosidic bonds that are inside. Pectin lyase is critical for several biological processes, such as the maturation of fruits and reshaping of plant cell walls. The enzyme's reaction pathway contains binding to the substrate and active site, splitting of glycosidic bonds, unsaturated products forming, and product release. Pectin lyase is crucial to decaying plant materials and is commonly used in the food industry and biotechnology.

== Organisms and function ==
There are many organisms that contain the pectin lyase enzyme such as plants (Fruits and Vegetables), especially, during fruit maturation, some plants produce internal pectin lyases that lead to the analysis of pectin in cell walls, such as citrus, apples, and Pumpkin. The waste residues of citrus, apple, and pomelo and their peels are the major raw resources of pectin production because they are considered by-products of producing juice in the food industry. Also, it helps protect the plants from the damage that is caused by pathogenic microorganisms due to its rigidity and flexibility. In plant cell culture, it is combined with the enzyme cellulase to produce protoplasts by breaking down the plant cell walls. Pectin exhibits versatility in its chemical behavior depending on the conditions it is exposed to. It can undergo ester hydrolysis or glycosidic bond cleavage to produce galacturonic acid and alcohol when acid, alkali, or pectinase is present. When Pectin is subjected to specific conditions, such as low pH and high sugar concentration, it has the ability to form gel in the presence of sugar, acid, or calcium ions. This gel-forming property of pectin is commonly used in medication industries and food, where it acts as a thickening substance, stabilizer, and emulsifying agent in various food processing applications. Not only this but also, pectin is essential in medicine, cosmetics, and other industries, including the production of health-related products aimed at preventing and treating conditions such as diabetes and obesity are of concern.

== Crystal structure ==
The crystal structures of pectin lyase A (PNLA) from two different strains of Aspergillus niger which are N400 and 4M-147. PNLA shows that they have a parallel β sheet structure and share several structural features with pectate lyases such as amino acid stacks and an asparagine ladder. The three-dimensional structure has been used to identify the Pectin lyase B (PNLB) from Aspergillus niger structure with a resolution of 1.7Å.

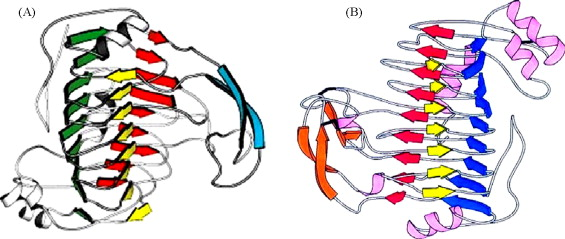
Crystal structure of Pectin Lyase

This image of crystal structure of pectin lyase represents the structural features of both pectin lyase (PNLA and PNLB). Letter A indicates (PNLA) from strain 4M-147. In (A), we see an overview of the pectin lyase A structure, depicted with arrows for β strands and coils for helices. The parallel β sheet 1 (PB1) is colored yellow, the green color refers to PB2, the color red refers to PB3 and the blue color indicates the antiparallel β sheet has a long T3 loop. Moving on to (PNLB), the letter B shows the backbone of pectin lyase with pink coils showing helices and arrows indicating β structures. The yellow color refers to parallel β sheet PB1, the blue color refers to PB2, and the red color refers to PB3. The orange indicates the antiparallel β structure in the first T3 turn and a short β strand in the third T3 loop. Additionally, the thick black lines represent the position of disulfide bonds.

== Active site ==
Every enzyme has an active site which is a specific area where a substrate binds and experiences a chemical reaction. This area of pectin involves special amino acid remnants that are attached to pectin, catalyze the splitting of glycosidic bonds, guarantee substrate specificity, and stabilize the reaction intermediate. The active site is pivotal to the ability of pectin lyase to efficiently break pectin which is known as a complex polysaccharide present in plant cell walls.

== Nomenclature ==
The systematic name of this enzyme class is (1→4)-6-O-methyl-α-D-galacturonan lyase. Other names in common use include:

- endo-pectin lyase,
- pectin methyltranseliminase,
- pectin trans-eliminase,
- pectolyase,
- PL,
- PMGL,
- PNL, and
- polymethylgalacturonic transeliminase.

== Biotechnology applications ==
The pectin lyase is playing a crucial role in many biotechnological uses including the textile industry, paper manufacturing, wastewater pretreatment of pectin, clarifying of the juice, and extraction of oil. It has the ability to efficiently break the pectin molecule's back bone by β-eliminating in order to form pectin-oligosaccharide. As a result, this method led to not producing a high level of toxic methanol and this process has the advantage of high efficiency, good enzymatic selectivity, and few by-products.

In addition, the presence of undesirable enzymatic activity in commercial pectinases may be detrimental to aroma because they are responsible for producing unpleasant volatile off flavor. There are many reports of fruit juice clarification by pectin lyases.

The alkaline pectinase is inappropriate for use in the food industry due to the acidic pH of fruit juices. However, they have a very high demand in the textile industries. They are used for retting of plant fibers such as ramie, sunn hemp, jute, flax and hemp. The first report on retting of sunn hemp (Crotalaria juncea) by pectin lyase produced by Aspergillus flavus MTCC 7589 was published in 2008 but this aspect of pectin lyases needs to be extensively investigated further.
