= Pectobacteriaceae =

Scientific classification
- Domain: Bacteria
- Kingdom: Pseudomonadati
- Phylum: Pseudomonadota
- Class: Gammaproteobacteria
- Order: Enterobacterales
- Family: Pectobacteriaceae; Adeolu et al. 2016

Genera
- Acerihabitans; Biostraticola; Brenneria; Bruguierivorax; Dickeya; Lonsdalea; Musicola; Pectobacterium; Prodigiosinella; Sodalis; Symbiopectobacterium

Family of bacteria

The Pectobacteriaceae are a family of Gram-negative bacteria which largely consist of plant pathogens. This family is a member of the order Enterobacterales in the class Gammaproteobacteria of the phylum Pseudomonadota. The type species of this family is Pectobacterium.

The name Pectobacteriaceae is derived from the Latin term Pectobacterium, referring the type genus of the family and the suffix "-aceae", an ending used to denote a family. Together, Pectobacteriaceae refers to a family whose nomenclatural type is the genus Pectobacterium.

== Biochemical Characteristics and Molecular Signatures ==
Members of the family produce acid from N-acetylglucosamine and are negative for arginine dihydrolase, orthinine decarboxylase and lysine decarboxylase. These bacteria are catalase-positive, oxidase-negative, and do not produce hydrogen disulfide.

Genomic analyses identified four conserved signature indels (CSIs) that are specific this family in the proteins transcriptional activator RhaS, flagellar motor protein MotB, a two-component sensor histidine kinase protein and a hypothetical protein. These molecular signatures provide a reliable molecular means for distinguishing members of the family Pectobacteriaceae from other families in the order Enterobacterales and other bacteria.

== Historical Systematics and Current Taxonomy ==
Pectobacteriaceae, as of 2021, contains eight validly published genera. Members of this family were originally members of the Enterobacteriaceae family, a large phylogenetically unrelated group of species with distinct biochemical characteristics and different ecological niches. The original assignment of species into the family Enterobacteriaceae was largely based on 16S rRNA genome sequence analyses, which is known to have low discriminatory power and the results of which changes depends on the algorithm and organism information used. Despite this, the analyses still exhibited polyphyletic branching, indicating the presence of distinct subgroups within the family.

In 2016, Adeolu et al. proposed the division of Enterobacteriaceae into 7 novel families based on comparative genomic analyses and the branching pattern of various phylogenetic trees constructed from conserved genome sequences, 16S rRNA sequences and multilocus sequence analyses. Molecular markers, specifically conserved signature indels, specific to this family were also identified as evidence supporting the division independent of phylogenetic trees.
