= RG =

RG, Rg or rg may refer to:

== People ==
- Pete RG (fl. 1998–2015), an American singer-songwriter
- Razor Ramon RG or Makoto Izubuchi (born 1974), a Japanese professional wrestler
- RG Sharma (born 1987), an Indian international cricketer
- RG Snyman (born 1995), South African rugby union player

== Places ==
- RG postcode area, the postal address for the area of Reading and surrounding towns in England
- Province of Ragusa, Sicily, Italy, vehicle registration prefix

== Science and technology ==
=== Computing and telecommunications ===
- Radio Guide, used to specify Coaxial cables (including a list of RG cable types)
- ReplayGain, a proposed standard for normalizing the perceived loudness of digital audio playback
- ResearchGate, a social network for scientists and researchers

=== Military ===
- RG-6 grenade launcher, a Russian weapon
- RG-42, a Russian fragmentation grenade
- armored vehicles designed by Land Systems OMC, South Africa (including a list of RG-type vehicles)

=== Other uses in science and technology ===
- RG, or Rail Gourmet, a food brand and a division of SSP Group
- Radius of gyration, several related measures of the size of an object, a surface, or an ensemble of points
- Reachability Graph, a formal verification technique
- Renormalization group, in physics, a mathematical apparatus allowing investigation of a system at different size scales
- Research group, at universities or research centers, research groups are commonly abbreviated this way.
- RG color space, a color space
  - rg chromaticity, a two-dimensional color space in which there is no intensity information
- Rhamnogalacturonans, a type of pectin
- Roentgenium, symbol Rg, a chemical element

== Sport ==
- RG Heidelberg, a rugby union club from Heidelberg, Germany
- Rhythmic gymnastics
- Right guard, a position in American football

== Other uses ==
- Direction centrale des renseignements généraux or Renseignements Généraux, a defunct French interior intelligence agency
- Ibanez RG, a series of electric guitars produced by Hoshino Gakki
- r > g, an economics equation fundamental to Capital in the Twenty-First Century
- Regional Gathering, an event hosted by local chapters of American Mensa
- RG Financial Corporation, a financial holding company located in San Juan, Puerto Rico
- RG Line, a Finnish shipping company
- RG Veda, a Japanese manga first published in 1989
- Race Gurram, 2014 Indian film abbreviated as RG
- Röhm Gesellschaft or RG, a German brand of firearms (including a list of RG-type models)
- Rossiyskaya Gazeta, a Russian newspaper
- Varig (1927–2006), Brazilian airline (IATA code RG)
- A RG (roof garden) level in a building, also called Lower Penthouse (LPH) or a level where there is a rooftop garden in some buildings

== See also ==
- RG1 (disambiguation)
- RG2 (disambiguation)
- RG3 (disambiguation)
- R&G (disambiguation)
- Rio Grande (disambiguation)
