= Pectinesterase =

Class of enzymes

pectinesterase
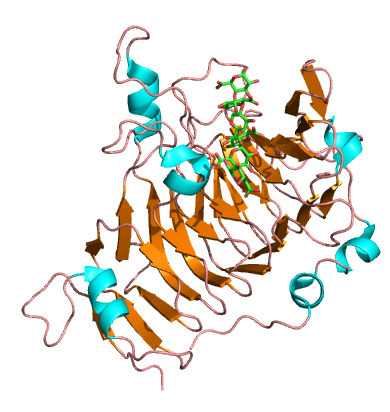
- Pectin methylesterase from Dickeya dadantii in complex with hexasaccharide. PDB 2ntb

Identifiers
- EC no.: 3.1.1.11
- CAS no.: 9025-98-3

Databases
- IntEnz: IntEnz view
- BRENDA: BRENDA entry
- ExPASy: NiceZyme view
- KEGG: KEGG entry
- MetaCyc: metabolic pathway
- PRIAM: profile
- PDB structures: RCSB PDB PDBe PDBsum
- Gene Ontology: AmiGO / QuickGO
Search
- PMC: articles
- PubMed: articles
- NCBI: proteins

Pectinesterase (EC 3.1.1.11; systematic name pectin pectylhydrolase) is a ubiquitous cell-wall-associated enzyme that presents several isoforms that facilitate plant cell wall modification and subsequent breakdown. It catalyzes the following reaction:

pectin + n H_{2}O = n methanol + pectate

It is found in all higher plants as well as in some bacteria and fungi. Pectinesterase functions primarily by altering the localised pH of the cell wall resulting in alterations in cell wall integrity.

Pectinesterase catalyses the de-esterification of pectin into pectate and methanol. Pectin is one of the main components of the plant cell wall. In plants, pectinesterase plays an important role in cell wall metabolism during fruit ripening. In plant bacterial pathogens such as Erwinia carotovora and in fungal pathogens such as Aspergillus niger, pectinesterase is involved in maceration and soft-rotting of plant tissue. Plant pectinesterases are regulated by pectinesterase inhibitors, which are ineffective against microbial enzymes.

== Function ==
Recent studies have shown that the manipulation of pectinesterase expression can influence numerous physiological processes. In plants, pectinesterase plays a role in the modulation of cell wall mechanical stability during fruit ripening, cell wall extension during pollen germination and pollen tube growth, abscission, stem elongation, tuber yield and root development. Pectinesterase has also been shown to play a role in a plants response to pathogen attack. A cell wall-associated pectinesterase of Nicotiana tabacum is involved in host cell receptor recognition for the tobacco mosaic virus movement protein and it has been shown that this interaction is required for cell-to-cell translocation of the virus.

Pectinesterase action on the components of the plant cell wall can produce two diametrically opposite effects. The first being a contribution to the stiffening of the cell wall by producing blocks of unesterified carboxyl groups that can interact with calcium ions forming a pectate gel. The other being that proton release may stimulate the activity of cell wall hydrolases contributing to cell wall loosening.

== Esterification of pectin ==
Pectins form approximately 35% of the dry weight of dicot cell walls. They are polymerised in the cis Golgi, methylesterified in the medial Golgi and substituted with side chains in the trans Golgi cisternae. Pectin biochemistry can be rather complicated but put simply, the pectin backbone comprises 3 types of polymer: homogalacturonan (HGA); rhamnogalacturonan I (RGI); rhamnogalacturonan II (RGII).

Homogalacturonan is highly methyl-esterified when exported into cell walls and is subsequently de-esterified by the action of pectinesterase and other pectic enzymes. Pectinesterase catalyses the de-esterification of methyl-esterified D-galactosiduronic acid units in pectic compounds yielding substrates for depolymerising enzymes, particularly acidic pectins and methanol.

Most of the purified plant pectinesterases have neutral or alkaline isoelectric points and are bound to the cell wall via electrostatic interactions. Pectinesterases can however display acidic isoelectric points as detected in soluble fractions of plant tissues. Until recently, it was generally assumed that plant pectinesterases remove methyl esters in a progressive block-wise fashion, giving rise to long contiguous stretches of un-esterified GalA residues in homogalacturonan domains of pectin. Alternatively it was thought that fungal pectinesterases had a random activity resulting in the de-esterification of single GalA residues per enzyme/substrate interactions. It has now been shown that some plant pectinesterase isoforms may exhibit both mechanisms and that such mechanisms are driven by alterations in pH. The optimal pH of higher plants is usually between pH 7 and pH 8 although the pH of pectinesterase from fungi and bacteria is usually much lower than this.

== Molecular biology and biochemistry ==
PE proteins are synthesised as pre-proteins of 540–580 amino acids possessing a signal sequence and a large amino-terminal extension of around 22 kDa. This terminal extension is eventually removed to yield a mature protein of 34-37 kDa. Most PEs lack consensus sequences for N-glycosylation in the mature protein, although at least one site is present in the amino-terminal extension region.

Spatial and temporal regulation of pectinesterase activity during plant development is based on a large family of isoforms. Recently, the systematic sequencing of the Arabidopsis thaliana genome has led to the identification of 66 open reading frames that are annotated as pectinesterases, most of which are encoded as large pre-proproteins. The signal peptide pre-region is required for targeting the enzyme to the endoplasmic reticulum and consists of about 25 amino acid residues. These N-terminal regions contain several glycosylation sites and it is thought that these sites also play a role in targeting.

Pectinesterase is thought to be secreted to the apoplasm with highly methylated pectin although at some point along this secretory pathway the N-terminal pro-peptide is cleaved off. Currently, the role of the pro-region is unknown although it has been hypothesised that it may act as an intramolecular chaperone, ensuring correct folding or deactivating activity until PE insertion in the cell wall is complete.

Recently, particular attention has been devoted to molecular studies of pectinesterase leading to the characterisation of several related isoforms in various higher plant species. Some of these pectinesterases were shown to be ubiquitously expressed, whereas others are specifically expressed during fruit ripening, germination of the pollen grain, or stem elongation. Such data suggests that pectinesterases are encoded by a family of genes that are differentially regulated in cell type in response to specific developmental or environmental cues.

== Plant isoforms ==
Several pectinesterase isoforms differing in molecular weight, isoelectric point and biochemical activity have been identified in dicotyledonous plants. Pectinesterase isoforms are encoded by a family of genes, some of which are constitutively expressed throughout the plant, whereas others are differentially expressed in specific tissues and at different developmental stages. Isoforms of pectinesterase differ in various biochemical parameters such as relative molecular mass, isoelectric point, optimum pH, substrate affinity, ion-requirement and location.

== Structure ==
Pectinesterase, catalytic

Identifiers
- Symbol: Pectinesterase_cat
- Pfam: PF01095
- InterPro: IPR000070
- PROSITE: PDOC00413
Available protein structures:
- PDB: 1gq8, 1qjv 1xg2, 2nsp, 2nst, 2nt6, 2nt9, 2ntb, 2ntp, 2ntq IPR000070 PF01095 (ECOD; PDBsum)
- AlphaFold: IPR000070; PF01095

The N-terminal pro-peptides of pectinesterase are variable in size and sequence and show a low level of amino acid identity. Alternatively the C-terminal catalytic region is highly conserved and constitutes the mature enzyme. The first three-dimensional structure solved for a plant pectinesterase was for an isoform from carrot (Daucus carota) root and consists of a right-handed parallel β-helix as seen in all the carbohydrate esterase family CE-8, a transmembrane domain and a pectin binding cleft. Similarly several pectinesterase structures have been elucidated in fungi and E. coli and share most of the structural motifs seen in plants.

Prokaryotic and eukaryotic pectinesterases share a few regions of sequence similarity. The crystal structure of pectinesterase from Erwinia chrysanthemi revealed a beta-helix structure similar to that found in pectinolytic enzymes, though it is different from most structures of esterases. The putative catalytic residues are in a similar location to those of the active site and substrate-binding cleft of pectate lyase.
