= Penicillium occitanis =

Scientific classification
- Domain: Eukaryota
- Kingdom: Fungi
- Division: Ascomycota
- Class: Eurotiomycetes
- Order: Eurotiales
- Family: Aspergillaceae
- Genus: Penicillium
- Species: P. occitanis

Binomial name
- Penicillium occitanis Jain, S.; Parriche, M.; Durand, H.; Tiraby, G. 1990

Species of fungus

Penicillium occitanis is a species of fungus in the genus Penicillium which produces cellulase and pectinase. The mutant Pol6 produces a very high amount of cellulase and pectinase. This mutant might be used for industrial use.
