= R&G (disambiguation) =

Rhythm and grime is a subgenre of grime music.

R&G or R & G may also refer to:

- R & G Financial Corporation, Puerto Rican financial holding company
- R&G (Rhythm & Gangsta): The Masterpiece, 2004 album by Snoop Dogg
- R&G (motorcycle accessories), British motorcycle accessory company

== See also ==
- RG (disambiguation)
- Rng
