= Agrana =

Austrian food company

- Type: Private
- ISIN: AT000AGRANA3
- Industry: food
- Founded: 1988
- Headquarters: Vienna, Austria Austria
- Key people: Stephan Büttner, CEO Norbert Harringer CTO
- Revenue: €3.51 billion (2024/25)
- Number of employees: 8,980 (2024/25)
- Website: https://www.agrana.com/en/

The Agrana Group is a food company based in Vienna that produces sugar, starch, fruit preparation, juice concentrate and ethanol fuel. Agrana is mainly supplying to international food industry, with some minor end customer business. A known brand is Wiener Zucker - with this name products like sugar cube, powdered sugar, gelling sugar or brown sugar are sold to end consumers. Another global brand name is Watson Says - a diverse portfolio of premium flavored syrups, sauces, fruit concentrates, and fruit mixes for cocktails or coffee specialities is offered.

Agrana runs around 50 facilities with major production bases in Australia, Austria, Argentina, Brazil, China, France, Germany, Hungary, Morocco, Mexico, Poland, Romania, South Africa, South Korea, Ukraine, and the United States.

In 2021, Agrana ranked 6th in the modified starch category of FoodTalks' Global Food Thickener Companies list.

Beginning of June 2025, the Austrian Fruit Juice company Austria Juice was completely taken over by the Agrana Beteiligungs-AG and became a subsidiary.

== History ==
Agrana was founded in 1988 as a holding company for the Austrian sugar and Starch industry. Operations started with 3 sugar plants (Tulln, Leopoldsdorf and Hohenau), a potato starch plant (Gmünd) and a corn starch plant (Aschach). Company history should however be considered dating back to 1902, when raw sugar production started in Leopoldsdorf. Similarly, sugar production in Tulln had started in 1937.

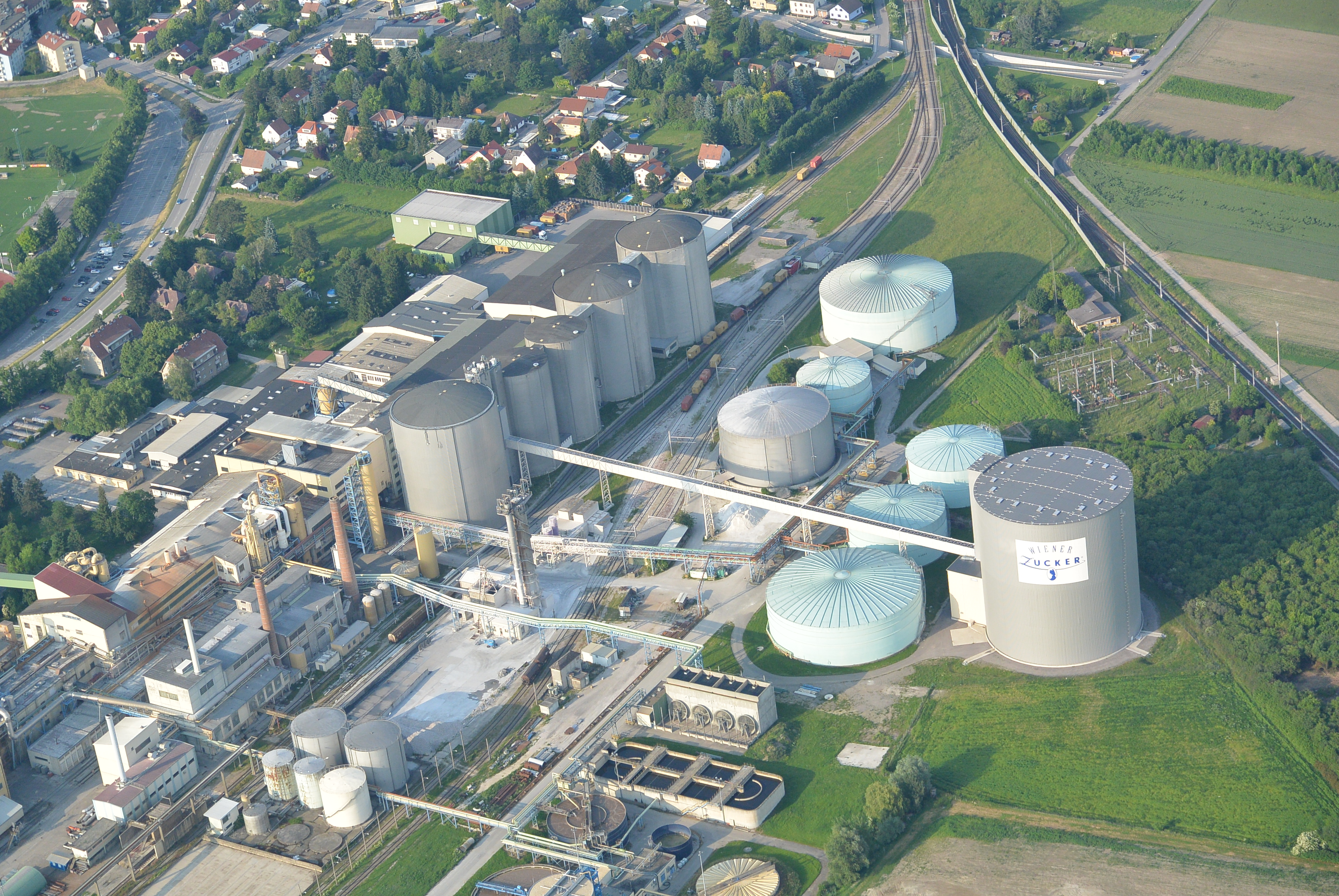
Sugar plant Tulln

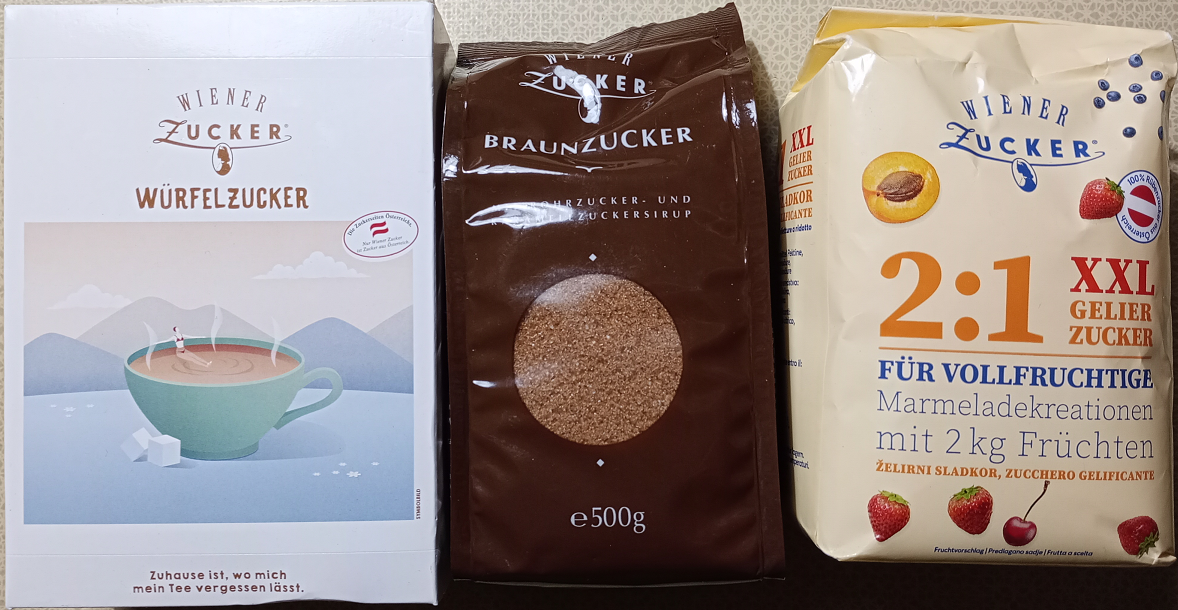
Products of the brand "Wiener Zucker" (sugar cube, brown sugar, gelling sugar 2026

The company Agrana (Symbol AGR) went public on the Vienna Stock Exchange in 1991.

In 1990, Agrana took stakes in sugar and starch plants in Hungary, and investment in neighbouring countries followed.

From 2003 to 2005, Agrana started reducing its sugar business due to European Union quotas and diversified in the fruit processing and juice concentrates businesses, acquiring several companies: Steirerobst, Vallosaft, Wink, Atys. As of 2012, Agrana operated 9 sugar plants, 5 starch plants and 37 processing sites for fruits throughout central Europe.

== Shareholders ==
75,5% of Agrana shares belong to Z&S Zucker und Stärke Holding AG, a 100% subsidiary of Agrana Zucker, Stärke und Frucht Holding AG. 24,5% is in free float.

German company Südzucker AG and Zucker-Beteiligungsgesellschaft m.b.H. each hold a 50% stake in Agrana Zucker, Stärke und Frucht Holding AG.

In turn, Zucker-Beteiligungsgesellschaft m.b.H.s main stakeholders is the Raiffeisenlandesbank Niederösterreich-Wien, with a 78,31% stake. Remaining capital is in the hands of Marchfelder Zuckerfabriken GesmbH, Estezet Beteiligungsgesellschaft mbH, Rübenproduzenten Beteiligungs GesmbH and the Leipnik-Lundenburger Invest Beteiligungs AG.

The Agrana BeteilungsAG is also a majority owner of other producing companies of the food industery: e.g. at the Austrian Instantina GmbH (brand names: Sweetiva, Dixi, Clio, Süssina) that produces hot chocolate-,coffee- and tea- powders, reduced calorie sweeteners and products for baking (baking powder, citric acid, vanilla sugar) for the end customers .

== Controversy ==
Agrana continued its operations in Russia while simultaneously expressing concerns about the duty-free import of Ukrainian sugar, claiming it negatively impacts its business.

== Group of companies ==
=== Agrana Sugar (Agrana Zucker Gmbh.) ===
- includes companies:

1. Moravskoslezské cukrovary s.r.o. (Czech Republic)
2. Magyar Cukor Zrt. (Hungary)
3. Slovenské cukrovary s.r.o. (Slovakia)
4. S.C. Agrana Romania S.A. (Romania);

- 10 production facilities in Central Europe;
- revenues: €684 million;
- number of employees: 2,336;
- processed 4,700,000 tons of sugar beet and 180,000 tonnes of raw sugar.

=== Agrana Starch (Agrana Stärke Gmbh.) ===
- includes companies:

1. Hungrana Kft. (Hungary)
2. S.C.A.F.D. Tandarei S.R.L. (Romania)
3. Agrana Bioethanol Gmbh (Austria);

- 5 production facilities in Central Europe;
- revenues: €499 million;
- number of employees: 880;
- processed 190,000 tons of starch potatoes and 820,000 tonnes of corn;

=== Agrana Fruit (Agrana J & F Holding Gmbh.) ===
- includes companies:

1. Agrana France (Fruit processing for ice cream, dairy products, baked goods and for the food industry)

2. Agrana Juice Holding Gmbh (Austria);

- 37 production facilities worldwide;
- revenues: €806 million;
- number of employees: 4,711;
- processed 940,000 tons of fruits.

=== Research and development ===
The company Agrana Research & Innovation Center is an AGRANA 100% subsidiary responsible for research and development for sugar, fruit, starch and bioethanol.

== See also ==
- Official website
- Vienna Stock Exchange: Market Data Agrana Beteiligungs-AG
