= Pectate trisaccharide-lyase =

Class of enzymes

Identifiers
- EC no.: 4.2.2.22

Databases
- IntEnz: IntEnz view
- BRENDA: BRENDA entry
- ExPASy: NiceZyme view
- KEGG: KEGG entry
- MetaCyc: metabolic pathway
- PRIAM: profile
- PDB structures: RCSB PDB PDBe PDBsum
Search
- PMC: articles
- PubMed: articles
- NCBI: proteins

Pectate trisaccharide-lyase (EC 4.2.2.22, exopectate-lyase, pectate lyase A, PelA) is an enzyme with systematic name (1→4)-α-D-galacturonan reducing-end-trisaccharide-lyase. This enzyme catalyses the following chemical reaction:

eliminative cleavage of unsaturated trigalacturonate as the major product from the reducing end of polygalacturonic acid/pectate

The predominant action of this enzyme is removal of a trisaccharide.
