= Exo-poly-α-galacturonosidase =

Identifiers
- EC no.: 3.2.1.82
- CAS no.: 37288-58-7

Databases
- IntEnz: IntEnz view
- BRENDA: BRENDA entry
- ExPASy: NiceZyme view
- KEGG: KEGG entry
- MetaCyc: metabolic pathway
- PRIAM: profile
- PDB structures: RCSB PDB PDBe PDBsum
Search
- PMC: articles
- PubMed: articles
- NCBI: proteins

Exo-poly-α-galacturonosidase (EC 3.2.1.82, exopolygalacturonosidase, exopolygalacturanosidase, poly(1,4-α-D-galactosiduronate) digalacturonohydrolase) is an enzyme with systematic name poly[(1→4)-α-D-galactosiduronate] digalacturonohydrolase. It catalyses the hydrolysis of pectic acid from the non-reducing end, releasing digalacturonate.
