= Café+co =

Austrian beverage vending machine company

café+co International Holding GmbH
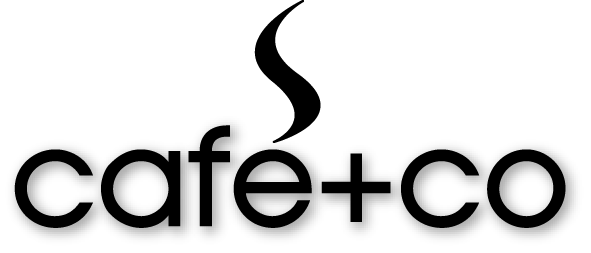
- Type: GmbH
- Founded: 2000
- Headquarters: Vienna, Austria
- Services: Coffee
- Revenue: 134 Mio. Euro (2010)
- Number of employees: 1900 (2020)
- Website: www.cafeplusco.com

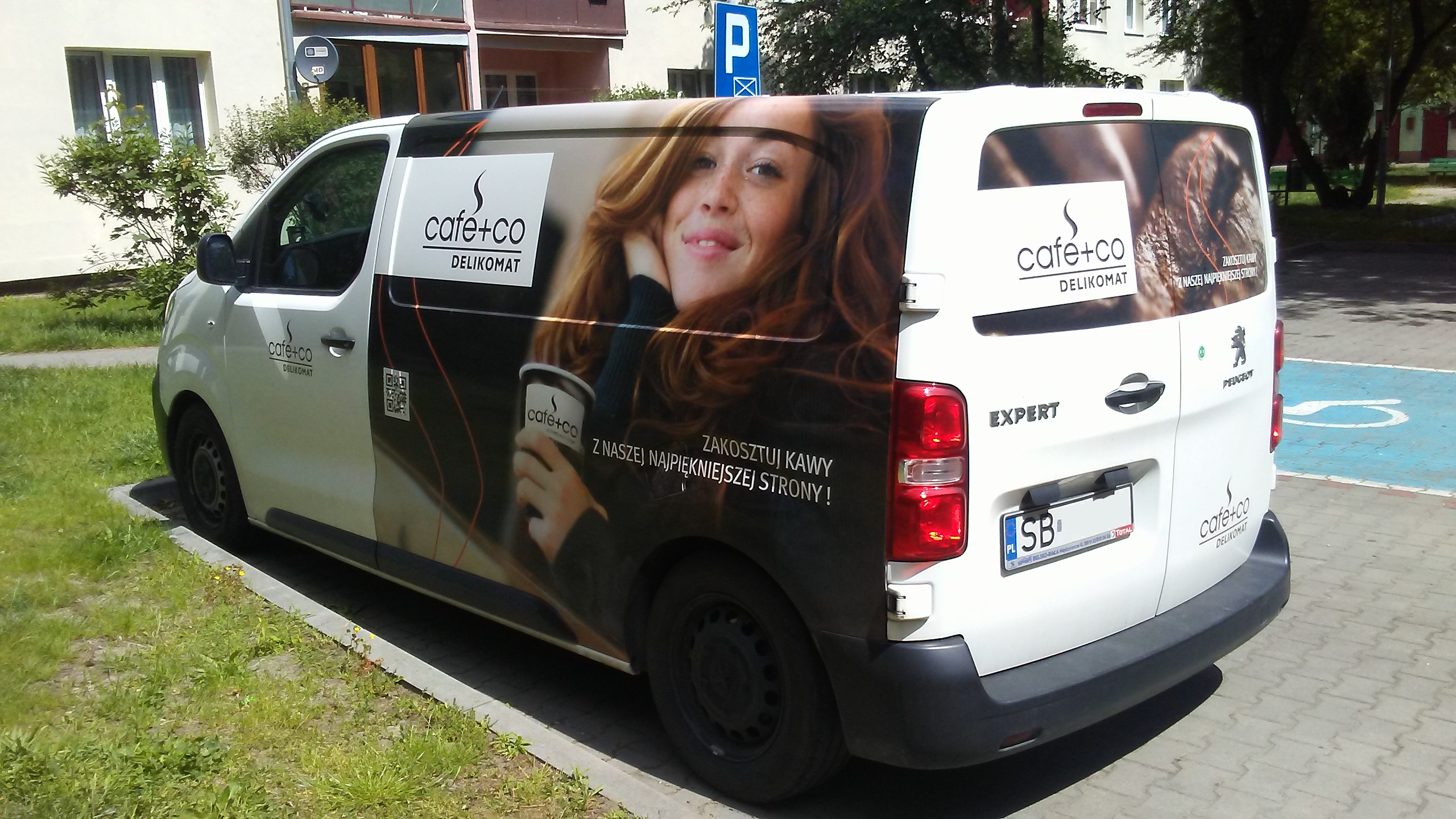
Service vehicle in Tomaszów Mazowiecki, Poland

Café+co International Holding (café+co) is an international operating corporate group with its headquarters in Vienna. The company markets its beverage dispensers for hot and cold drinks and its self-service vending machines for snacks and sweets in Austria as well as in middle and east Europe.

== Company ==
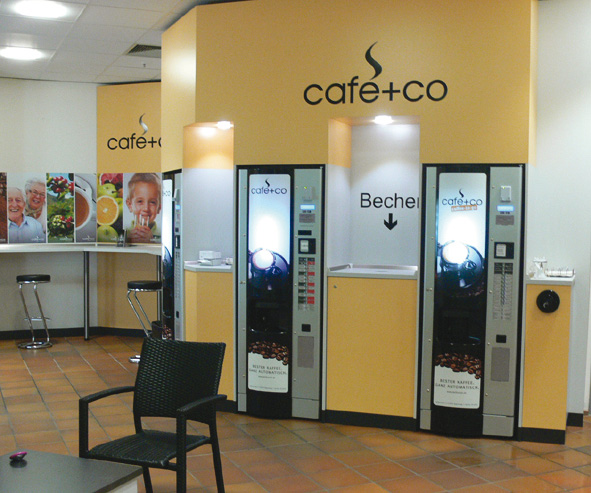
Vending machines, Ingolstadt

Since the foundation of the “Delikomat GmbH” in 1972 the corporate group has targeted the Austrian market. The foundation was followed by the acquisition of the “Vendare GmbH” in 1990 as well as the purchase of the “Top Cup GmbH”, which focuses on Office Coffee Service (vendors for smaller sized companies) as their main area of operations, in 2000.

The “snack+co GmbH” was founded, in the financial year 2006–07. The expansion into middle and east European countries began during the nineties and in 2000, national as well as international participations were centralised under the new founded “café+co International Holding GmbH”. Nowadays the network extends up to Moscow. Café+co is a 100% subsidiary of the “Raiffeisen-Konzern, which belongs to the “Leipnik-Lundenburger Invest Beteiligungs AG”. In 2002 “café+co” became the umbrella brand for the group as a whole.

The group has 50.000 beverage and snack vending machines in 12 countries, 21.500 of them in Austria. In 2010, with more than 1.200 employees it had an annual turnover of 134 million euro.

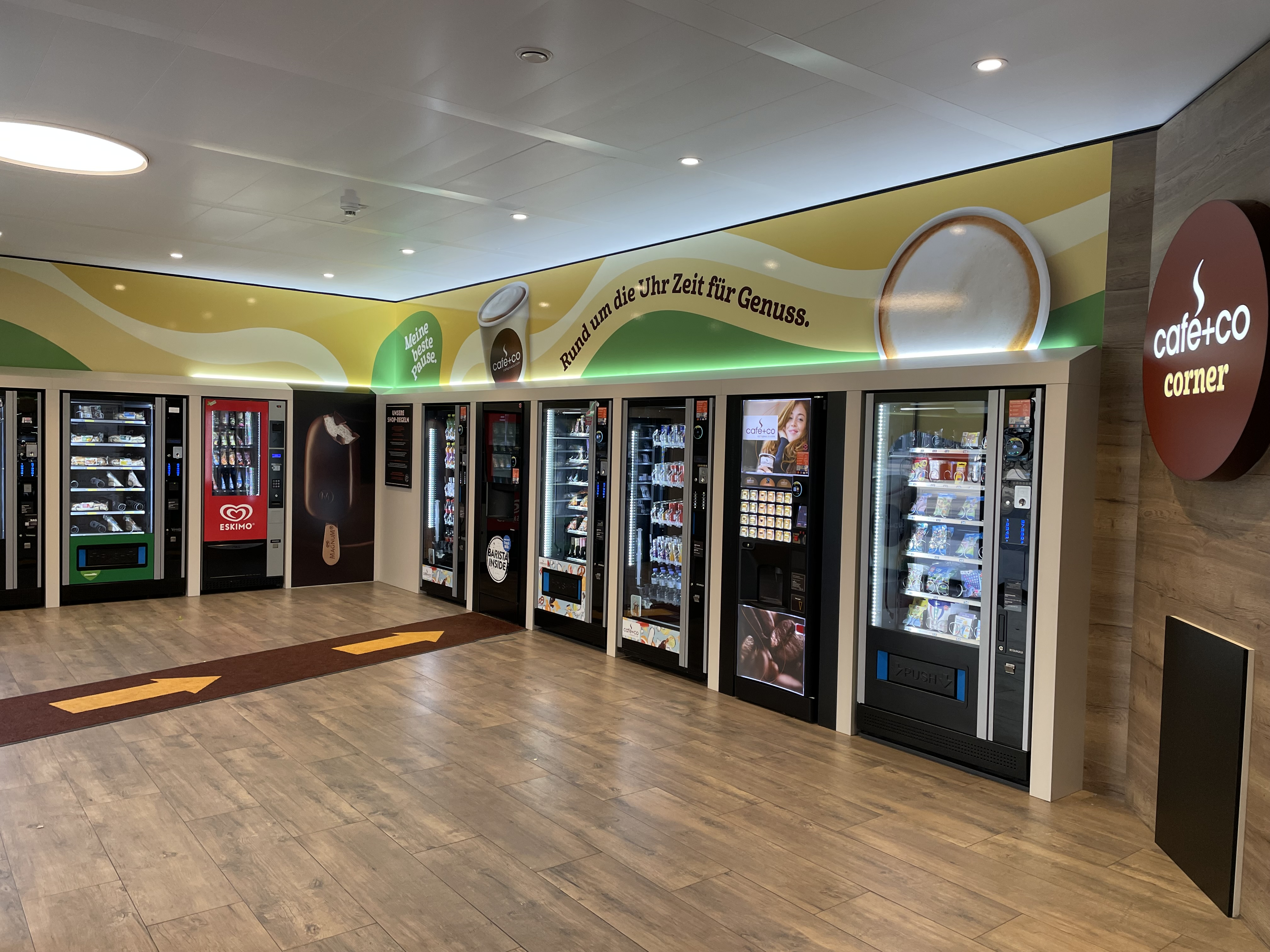
Café+co Corner, Klinik Floridsdorf

Café+co International Holding has 18 subsidiaries in Austria (Vendare Warenhandelsgesellschaft m.b.H.; Delikomat Betriebsverpflegung GmbH; Top Cup Office Coffee Service Vertriebsges.m.b.H.; snack+co GmbH), Germany (café+co Deutschland GmbH, Regensburg), Czech Republic (Delikomat s.r.o. nápojové automaty, Brno-Modřice), Slovakia (Delikomat Slovensko spol. S.r.o., Stupava), Hungary (café+co Ital- és Ételautomata Kft., Alsónémedi), Slovenia (Delikomat d.o.o. Maribor, Maribor), Croatia (Delikomat d.o.o., Sesvete-Soblinec), Poland (Delikomat Polska Sp. z o.o., Bielsko-Biala), Bosnia (Delikomat d.o.o.automati za prodaju pica i hrane, Tomislavgrad), Serbia (Delikomat d.o.o., Čačak), Romania (SC café+co Timişoara SRL, Timişoara) and Russia (café+co Rus Zao, Moskau).

== Products ==
The company café+co, deals with the operation and service of vending machines for hot and cold beverages as well as snacks and sweets, focusing on coffee and cacao drinks. Aside from selling coffee in standard versions like espresso, black coffee, brown coffee, melange, macchiato as well as latte macchiato there are self creations like mocha cappuccino or chococcino and coffee variations with special tastes like vanilla, hazelnut or caramel.

Café+co vending machines have up to 50 product selection options, for example; an individual sugar regulator for the optimal dosage, a cup stop, sensors for the usage of cups and if required, a lid dispenser for coffee-to-go products. Since 2006 a special premium line specialities coffee for the luxury office supply and for events is offered. Among others café+co premium, Milano, Nestlé, Jacobs, Segafredo, Naber, Tchibo, Lavazza, Fairtraid, Café HAG, Bensdorp and Milford are also offered in the different vending machines. The full automatic "café+co-shops" are found in companies as well as in public areas (public offices, hospitals and petrol stations).

In 2009 a sustainability program for the "stepwise" adaption of the coffee purchase was introduced. The company group is a licensed partner of "Fairtrade Österreich" and cooperation partner of the Rainforest Alliance.

Besides the operating of vending machines, café+co sells trade goods like a barista milk (specially developed for coffee drinks), a coffee sugar (with slight vanilla aroma) and tea.
