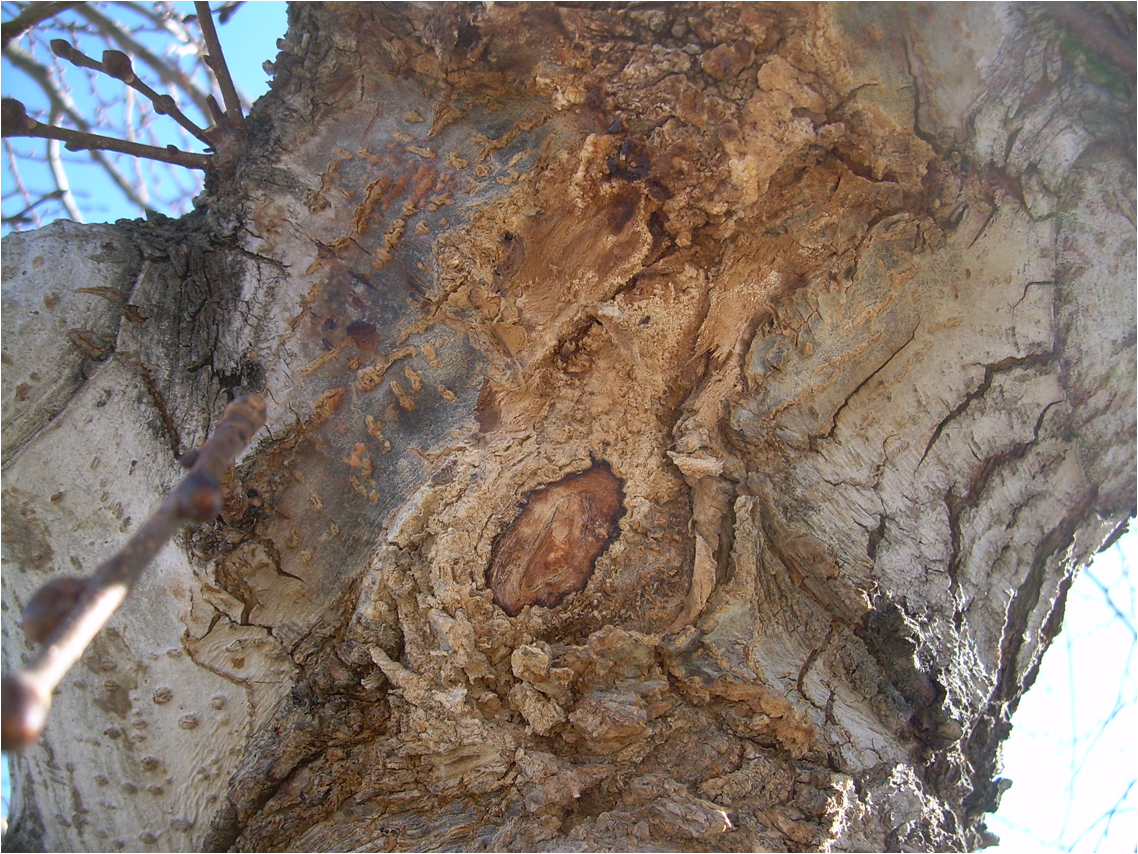
- Slime flux on a Camperdown elm caused by Pectobacterium carotovorum

Scientific classification
- Domain: Bacteria
- Kingdom: Pseudomonadati
- Phylum: Pseudomonadota
- Class: Gammaproteobacteria
- Order: Enterobacterales
- Family: Pectobacteriaceae
- Genus: Pectobacterium
- Species: P. carotovorum

Binomial name
- Pectobacterium carotovorum (Jones 1901) Waldee 1945

Subspecies
- Pectobacterium carotovorum subsp. actinidiae" Koh et al. 2012; Pectobacterium carotovorum subsp. brasiliense" Nabhan et al. 2012; Pectobacterium carotovorum subsp. wasabiae (Goto and Matsumoto 1987) Hauben et al. 1999; Pectobacterium carotovorum subsp. atrosepticum (van Hall 1902) Hauben et al. 1999; Pectobacterium carotovorum subsp. carotovorum (Jones 1901) Hauben et al. 1999; Pectobacterium carotovorum subsp. odoriferum (Gallois et al. 1992) Hauben et al. 1999; Pectobacterium carotovorum subsp. betavasculorum (Thomson et al. 1984) Hauben et al. 1999

Synonyms
- Erwinia carotovora

= Pectobacterium carotovorum =

Bacterial pathogen of several plants

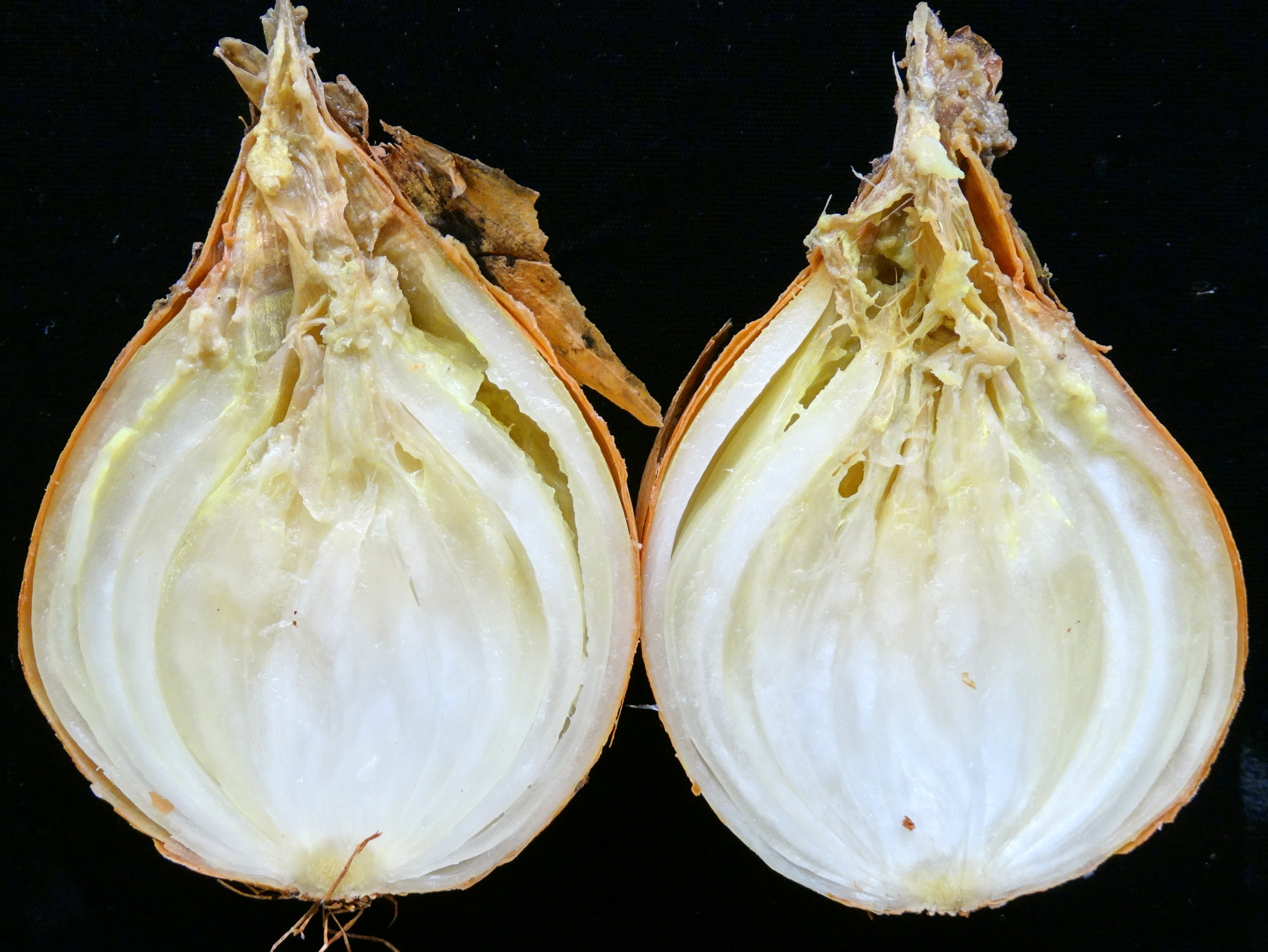
Soft rot in an onion caused by P. carotovorum or Dickeya dadantii

Pectobacterium carotovorum is a bacterium of the family Pectobacteriaceae; it used to be a member of the genus Erwinia.

The species is a plant pathogen with a diverse host range, including many agriculturally and scientifically important plant species. It produces pectolytic enzymes that hydrolyze pectin between individual plant cells. This causes the cells to separate, a disease plant pathologists term bacterial soft rot. Specifically, it causes beet vascular necrosis and blackleg of potato and other vegetables (hence the name carotovora – "carrot-eater"), as well as slime flux on many different tree species. Currently, there are four described subspecies of P. carotovorum (carotovorum, brasiliense, odoriferum, and actinidiae).

This bacterium is a ubiquitous plant pathogen with a wide host range (carrot, potato, tomato, leafy greens, squash and other cucurbits, onion, green peppers, African violets, etc.), able to cause disease in almost any plant tissue it invades. It is a very economically important pathogen in terms of post-harvest losses, and a common cause of decay in stored fruits and vegetables. Decay caused by P. carotovora is often referred to as "bacterial soft rot" though this may also be caused by other bacteria. Most plants or plant parts can resist invasion by the bacteria, unless some type of wound is present. High humidity and temperatures around 30 °C (86 °F) favor development of decay. The cells become highly motile near this temperature (26 °C (79 °F)) when fructose is present. Mutants can be produced which are less virulent. Virulence factors include: pectinases, cellulases, (which degrade plant cell walls), and also proteases, lipases, xylanases, and nucleases (along with the normal virulence factors for pathogens – Fe acquisition, lipopolysaccharide (LPS) integrity, multiple global regulatory systems).

== Management ==
KENGAP, partners of the CABI-led programme, Plantwise have several recommendations for the management of P. carotovora including; washing hands and disinfecting tools regularly during and after harvesting, avoiding harvesting in warm and moist conditions. They also recommend frequent irrigation during head formation should be avoided to allow heads to dry and planting on ridges, raised beds or well drained soils prevents water logging around the plants.

Plantwise partners also recommend thorough washing and disinfection of crates for to prevent post-harvest losses and that crop rotation with leguminous crops and cereals is practiced.

Gas sensors can be used to detect the pathogen in storage. Specifically metal–oxide–semiconductor-, electrochemical-, photoionization-, and nondispersive infrared- sensors are known to be useful. These are all tested, found to be usable, and calibrations provided in Rutolo et al. 2018.

== Sources ==
This article incorporates text from a free content work. Licensed under CC-BY-SA (license statement/permission). Text taken from Plantwise Factsheets for Farmers: Bacterial Soft Rot on Brassica, KENGAP Horticulture, CAB International + Plantwise.

This article incorporates text from a free content work. Licensed under CC-BY-SA (license statement/permission). Text taken from PMDG: Bacterial soft rot on cabbage, Jonathan M. Gekone (MOALF), Stephen Koech (KALRO) and Miriam Otipa (KALRO), CAB International + Plantwise.
