= Preserving sugar =

Sugar used in jam-making

Preserving sugar is a kind of sugar used in making high-pectin fruits such as oranges and plums into marmalades, jams and other preserves.

It differs from regular table sugar by having larger crystals. This helps keep the sugar suspended in preserves while cooking, preventing burning at the bottom of the pot. It is also theorised to help make clearer, more transparent jellies by presenting less surface area, reducing froth generation that would normally require the cook to skim the surface often.
