= RG1 =

RG1 may refer to:

- Ginsenoside Rg1, a bioactive molecule
- a United Kingdom postcode covering Reading area
- RG-1 (propellant) is a Soviet/Russian rocket propellant similar to RP-1
- R1–RG1 (Rodalies de Catalunya), a commuter rail line in Catalonia, Spain

RG-I may refer to:

- Rhamnogalacturonan I, a type of pectin
