= Gelling sugar =

Sugar product used to produce preserves

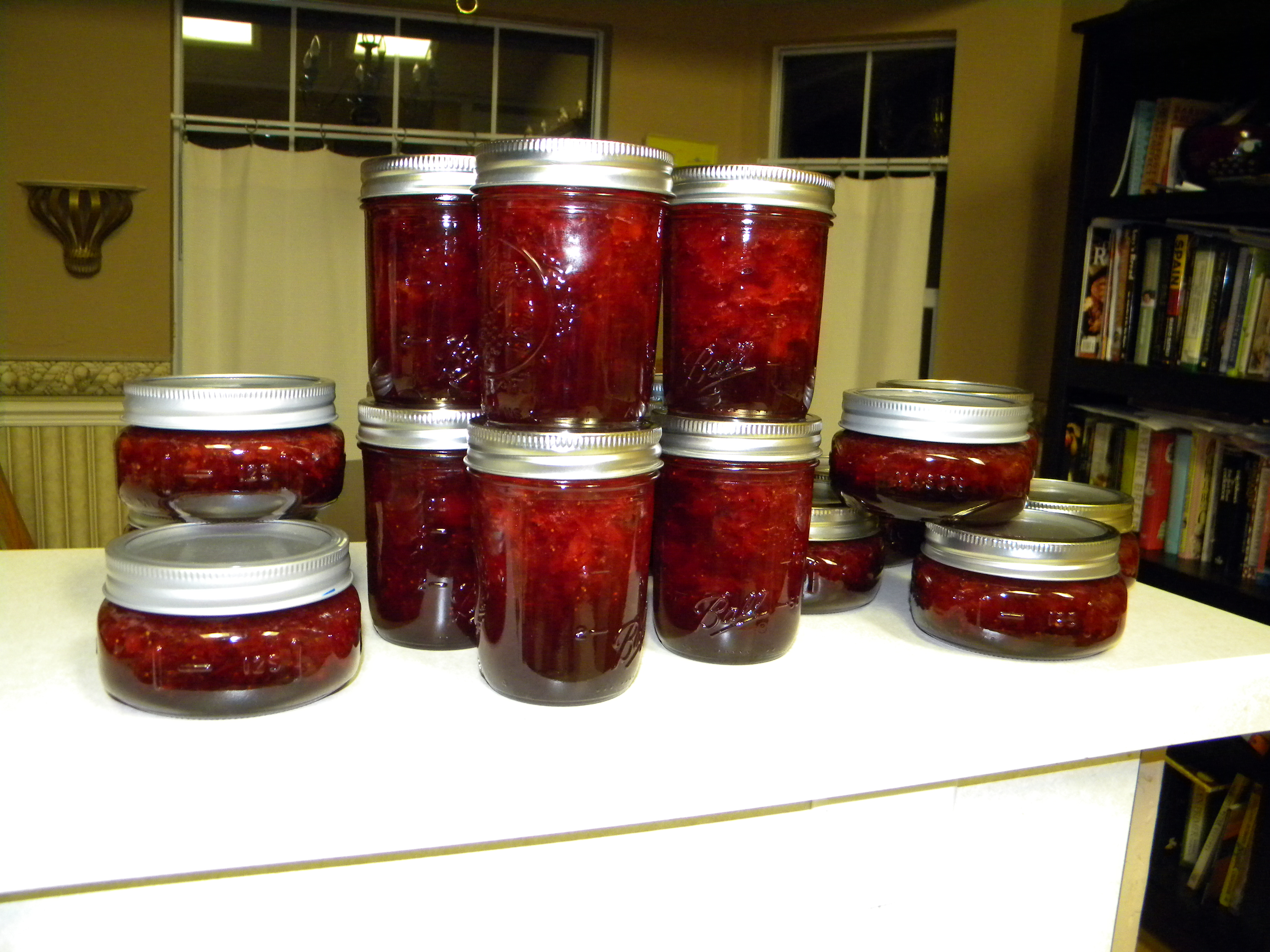
Strawberry jam created from gelling sugar

Gelling sugar or (British) jam sugar or (US) jelly sugar or sugar with pectin is a kind of sugar that is used to produce preserves, and which contains pectin as a gelling agent. It also usually contains citric acid as a preservative, sometimes along with other substances, such as sorbic acid or sodium benzoate

Gelling sugar from German suppliers comes in three different varieties, labeled 1:1, 2:1 and 3:1, where the first number indicates the amount of fruit to be used in relation to the sugar.

Sugar regulates the gelling of fruit jellies and preserves and is essential to obtain the desired consistency and firmness. This gel-forming process is called gelation. Sugar is essential because it attracts and holds water during the gelling process. Gelling sugar is used for traditional British recipes for jam, marmalade and preserves with the following formulas:

- 1:1 – Use for jellies and jams with equal weights of fruit and Gelling Sugar.
- 2:1 – Use for preserves to produce less sweetness. Use twice as much fruit in weight as you do Gelling Sugar.
- 3:1 – Use for preserves to produce maximum fruit taste. Use three times as much fruit in weight as you do Gelling Sugar.

Gelling sugar cannot be stored as long as normal sugar, because of its pectin content. Pectin requires acid and sugar for the gelling process.

Gelling sugar is different from preserving sugar, which does not contain pectin and is just sugar with larger crystals to avoid foam.
