= Beet vascular necrosis =

Scientific classification
- Domain: Bacteria
- Kingdom: Pseudomonadati
- Phylum: Pseudomonadota
- Class: Gammaproteobacteria
- Order: Enterobacterales
- Family: Pectobacteriaceae
- Genus: Pectobacterium
- Species: P. carotovorum
- Subspecies: P. c. subsp. betavasculorum

Trinomial name
- Pectobacterium carotovorum subsp. betavasculorum (Thomson et al. 1984) Hauben et al. 1999

Synonyms
- Erwinia carotovora subsp. betavasculorum; Pectobacterium betavasculorum

Bacterial disease in beet plants

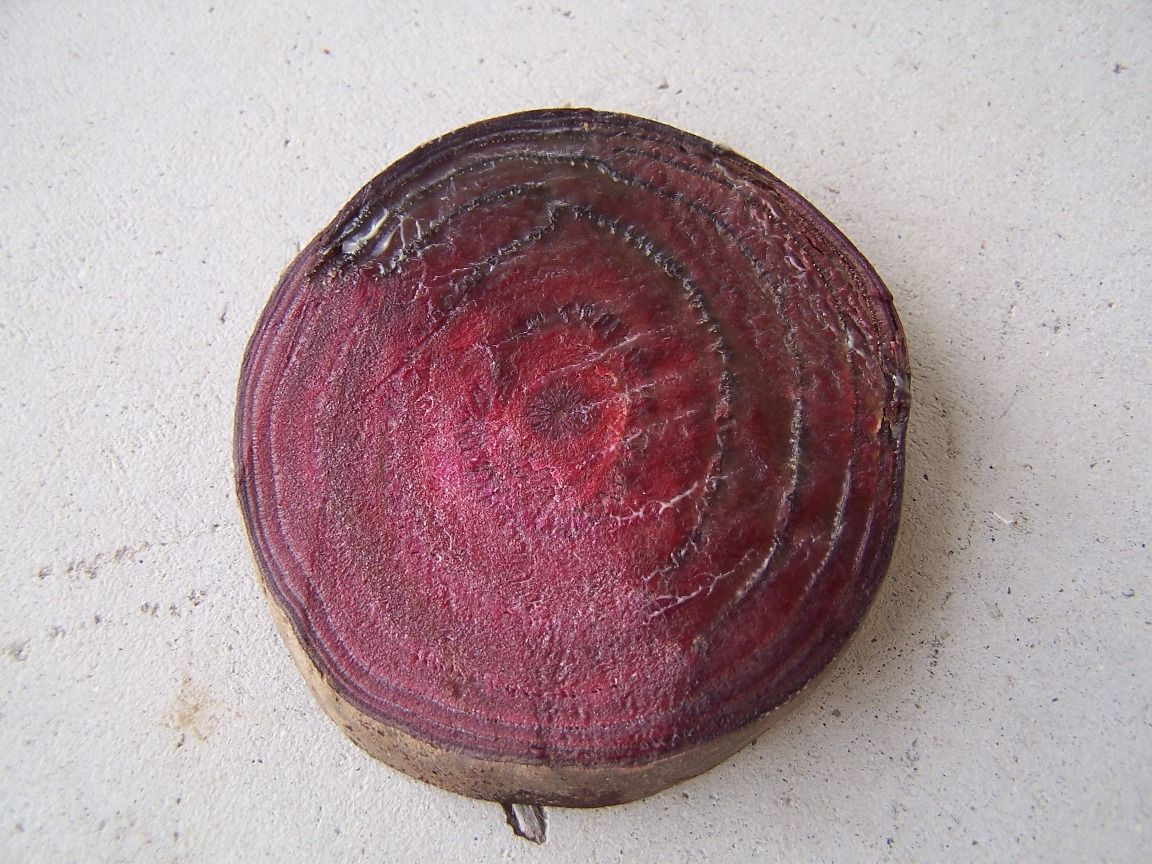
A table beet infected with Pectobacterium carotovorum subsp. betavasculorum. Note the rings of black vascular tissue colonized by the rotting bacteria.

Beet vascular necrosis and rot is a soft rot disease caused by the bacterium Pectobacterium carotovorum subsp. betavasculorum, which has also been known as Pectobacterium betavasculorum and Erwinia carotovora subsp. betavasculorum. It was classified in the genus Erwinia until genetic evidence suggested that it belongs to its own group; however, the name Erwinia is still in use. As such, the disease is sometimes called Erwinia rot today. It is a very destructive disease that has been reported across the United States as well as in Egypt. Symptoms include wilting and black streaks on the leaves and petioles. It is usually not fatal to the plant, but in severe cases the beets will become hollowed and unmarketable. The bacteria is a generalist species which rots beets and other plants by secreting digestive enzymes that break down the cell wall and parenchyma tissues. The bacteria thrive in warm and wet conditions, but cannot survive long in fallow soil. However, it is able to persist for long periods of time in the rhizosphere of weeds and non-host crops. While it is difficult to eradicate, there are cultural practices that can be used to control the spread of the disease, such as avoiding injury to the plants and reducing or eliminating application of nitrogen fertilizer.

== Hosts ==
Fodder beets, sugar beets and fodder-sugar crosses are all susceptible to infection by Pectobacterium carotovorum subsp. betavasculorum. Today most beet cultivars are resistant to the pathogen, however, isolates vary geographically, and some cultivars of beets are only resistant to specific isolates of bacteria. For example, the cultivar USH11 demonstrates resistance to both Montana and California isolates, whereas Beta 4430 is highly susceptible to the Montana isolates but resistant to the California isolate. Other cultivars resistant to California isolates of Pectobacterium caratovorum subsp. betavasculorum include Beta 4776R, Beta 4430R and Beta 4035R, but HH50 has been found to be susceptible.

Breeding for resistance to other diseases such as beet yellows virus without also selecting for vascular necrosis resistance can leave cultivars susceptible to the pathogen. For example, the use of USH9A and H9B in California’s San Joaquin valley is thought to have led to an epiphytotic (severe) outbreak of disease in the early 1970s. This was likely because of the limited gene pool used when selecting strongly for resistance to beet yellows virus. Further information on resistant cultivars can be found in the section Management.

In addition to beets, Pectobacterium carotovara subsp. betavasculorum can also infect tomato, potato, carrots, sweet potato, radish, sunflower, artichokes, squash, cucumber and chrysanthemum. Other subspecies of Pectobacterium carotovora can also be pathogenic to beets. Erwinia carotovara subsp. atroseptica is a bacterial soft rot pathogen that is responsible for the disease Blackleg of Potato (Solanum tuberosum), and variants of this bacterium can cause root rot in sugarbeets,. This subspecies also has a wide host-range. Erwinia carotovora var. atroseptica has been detected in the rhizosphere of native vegetation and on weed species such as Lupinus blumerii and Amaranthus palmeri (pigweed). It is thought that the source of inoculums survives on these non-host plants in areas in which it is endemic as well as in the rhizosphere of other crops such as wheat and corn

== Symptoms ==
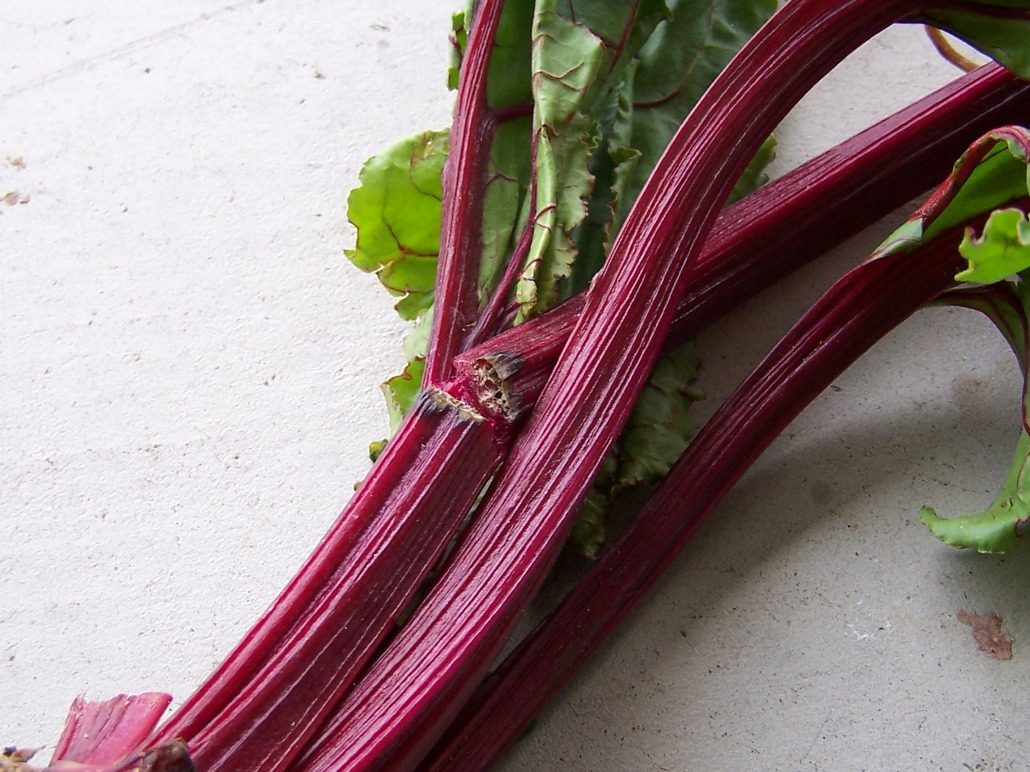
Table beet stem infected with Pectobacterium carotovorum subsp. betavasculorum. Note entry through a wound.

Symptoms can be found on both beet roots and foliage, although foliar symptoms are not always present. If present, foliar symptoms include dark streaking along petioles and viscous froth deposits on the crown which are a by-product of bacterial metabolism. Petioles can also become necrotic and demonstrate vascular necrosis. When roots become severely affected, wilting also occurs. Below ground symptoms include both soft and dry root rot. Affected vascular bundles in roots become necrotic and brown, and tissue adjacent to necrosis becomes pink upon air contact. The plants that do not die completely may have rotted-out, cavernous roots.

Various pathogens can cause root rot in beets; however the black streaking on petioles and necrotic vascular bundles in roots and adjacent pink tissue help to distinguish this disease from others such as Fusarium Yellows. Additionally, sampling from the rhizosphere of infected plants and serological tests can confirm the presence of Erwinia caratovora subs.

== Disease cycle ==
Pectobacterium carotovorum subsp. betavasculorum is a gram negative, rod bacteria with peritrichous flagella. For it to enter sugar beet, and thus cause infection, it is essential that there is an injury to the leaves, petioles or crown. Infection will often start at the crown and then move down into the root, and can occur at any point in the growing season if environmental conditions are favorable. Once the bacteria enters the plant, it will invade the vascular tissue and cause symptoms by producing plant cell wall degrading enzymes, like pectinases, polygalacturonases, and cellulases. This results in discolored or necrotic vascular tissue in the root, and the tissue bordering the vascular bundles will turn reddish upon contact with air. Following the infection of the vascular tissue, the bacteria reproduce as long as food resources are available, and the root begins to rot. There is significant variability in the type of rot – it can range from a dry rot to soft and wet rot – because of the multitude of additional microorganisms that may colonize the damaged tissue

Upon death of the sugar beet, or harvest of the field, the pathogen appears to survive in select living plant tissue like beet roots, or volunteer beets. However, it does not appear to survive in sugar beet seeds, or live in the soil after harvest. It is also possible for the pathogen to infect injured carrots, potato, sweet potato, tomato, radish, sunflower, artichokes, squash, cucumber and chrysanthemums; however, since those are often planted in the same season as sugar beets, they are not likely to be overwintering hosts.

== Environment ==
Injury to the leaves, petioles or crown is mandatory for the pathogen to gain entry to the host tissue. Accordingly, hail damage is correlated with a higher degree of disease outbreak. Young plants (less than eight weeks old) are also considered to be more prone to infection

Temperature and availability of moisture are key factors in determining the rate of disease development. Warm temperatures, 25-30 °C, promote rapid disease development., and can result in acute symptoms. Symptoms are also reported to appear at temperatures as low as 18 °C, but disease development is slowed; below that temperature, infections do not develop. Excessive water also promotes disease development by providing a more optimal environment for the pathogen, and has been shown to be a key factor in augmenting disease outbreak in fields with sprinkler irrigation

=== Agricultural ===
The degree of nitrogen fertilization is highly correlated to robust disease development: it has been shown that sugar beets supplied with excessive or adequate nitrogen are more diseased than sugarbeets with sub-optimal nitrogen levels. This is a paradox for farmers because, while increased nitrogen fertilization does increase sugar yield in non-infected sugarbeets, it also increases the severity of the disease if infection takes place. Thus, depending on the severity of infection, yield may go down with increased fertilizer use.

The spacing between plants also impacts the degree of infection: greater in-row spacing results in more diseased roots. This may be due to the fact that greater spacing promotes faster growth, and hence greater probability of cracks in the crown, or because of the increased amount of nitrogen available per plant.

Since the pathogen has multiple hosts, it is important for farmers to be wary of other plants in the surrounding area. It is possible for the pathogen to survive in weedy hosts, and can infect injured carrots, potato, sweet potato, tomato, radish, squash, and cucumber. Hence, the presence of these plants may increase the supply of inoculum.

=== Laboratory ===
If the pathogen is cultured in a lab, it can grow on Miller and Schroth media, can use sucrose to make reducing sugars, and can use either lactose, methyl alpha-glucoside, inulin or raffinose to make acids. It is also capable of surviving in culture medium sodium levels of up to 7–9%, and in temperatures as high as 39 °C.

== Management ==
Since the bacteria cannot survive in seeds, the best way to prevent the disease is to ensure that vegetatively propagated plant material are clean of infection, such that the bacterium does not enter the soil. However, if the bacteria is already present, there are some methods that can be used to lessen the infection.

=== Cultural practices ===
Because the bacteria readily enter the plant through wounds, management practices that decrease injury to the plants are important to control the spread of the disease. Cultivation is not recommended, as the machinery can become contaminated and physically spread the bacteria around the soil. Accidental leaf tearing or root scarring can also occur depending on the size of the crop, allowing the bacteria to enter more individual plants. If hilling the beets, great care must be taken to avoid getting soil into the crown, because the pathogen is soil-borne and this could expose the plant to more bacteria, thus increasing the risk of infection.

While most bacteria are motile and can swim, they cannot move very far due to their small size. However, they can be carried along by water, and a significant movement of Pectobacterium can be attributed to being carried downstream from irrigation and rainwater. To control the spread of the disease, limiting irrigation is another strategy. The bacteria also flourishes in wet conditions, so limiting excess water can control both the spread and severity of the disease.

Increased in-row spacing also causes more severe disease. In an infected field, yield decreased linearly when spacing was greater than 15 cm (6 in), so a spacing of 6 inches or less is recommended.

The bacteria can also utilize nitrogen fertilizer to accelerate their growth, thus limiting or eliminating the amount of nitrogen fertilizer applied will lessen the disease severity. For example, when fertilizer was applied to an infected field the infection rate per root increased from 11% (with no added nitrogen) to 36% (with 336 kg nitrogen/hectare), and sugar yields decreased.

| Cultivar | Resistance | Source |
|---|---|---|
| H9 | No | |
| H10 | No | |
| C17 | No | |
| 546 H3 | Moderate | |
| C13 | No | |
| E540 | No | |
| E538 | No | |
| E534 | Moderate | |
| E502 | Moderate | |
| E506 | Yes | |
| E536 | Yes | |
| C930-35 | Moderate | |
| C927-4 | Moderate | |
| C930-19 | Yes | |
| C929-62 | Yes | |

=== Resistance ===
The bacteria can survive in the rhizosphere of other crops such as tomato, carrots, sweet potato, radish, and squash as well as weed plants like lupin and pigweed, so it is very hard to get rid of it completely. When it is known that the bacterium is present in the soil, planting resistant varieties can be the best defense against the disease. Many available beet cultivars are resistant to Pectobacterium carotovorum subsp. betavasculorum, and some examples are provided in the corresponding table. A comprehensive list is maintained by the USDA on the Germplasm Resources Information Network. Even though some genes associated with root defense response have been identified, the specific mechanism of resistance is unknown, and it is currently being researched.

=== Biological control ===
Some bacteriophages, viruses that infect bacteria, have been used as effective controls of bacterial diseases in laboratory experiments. This relatively new technology is a promising control method that is currently being researched. Bacteriophages are extremely host-specific, which makes them environmentally sound as they will not destroy other, beneficial soil microorganisms. Some bacteriophages identified as effective controls of Pectobacterium carotovorum subsp. betavasculorum are the strains ΦEcc2 ΦEcc3 ΦEcc9 ΦEcc14. When mixed with a fertilizer and applied to inoculated calla lily bulbs in a greenhouse, they reduced diseased tissue by 40 to 70%. ΦEcc3 appeared to be the most effective, reducing the percent of diseased plants from 30 to 5% in one trial, to 50 to 15% in a second trial. They have also been used successfully to reduce rotting in lettuce caused by Pectobacterium carotovorum subsp. carotovorum, a different bacterial species closely related to the one that causes beet vascular necrosis.

While it is more difficult to apply bacteriophages in a field setting, it is not impossible, and laboratory and greenhouse trials are showing bacteriophages to potentially be a very effective control mechanism. However, there are a few obstacles to surmount before field trials can begin. A large problem is that they are damaged by UV light, so applying the phage mixture during the evening will help promote its viability. Also, providing the phages with susceptible non-pathogenic bacteria to replicate with can ensure there is adequate persistence until the bacteriophages can spread to the targeted bacteria. The bacteriophages are unable to kill all the bacteria, because they need a dense population of bacteria in order to effectively infect and spread, so while the phages were able to decrease the number of diseased plants by up to 35%, around 2,000 Colony Forming Units per milliliter (an estimate of living bacteria cells) were able to survive the treatment. Lastly, the use of these bacteriophages places strong selection on the host bacteria, which causes a high probability of developing resistance to the attacking bacteriophage. Thus it is recommended that multiple strains of the bacteriophage be used in each application so the bacteria do not have a chance to develop resistance to any one strain.

== Importance ==
The disease was first identified in the western states of, California, Washington, Texas, Arizona and Idaho in the 1970s and initially led to substantial yield losses in those areas. Erwinia caratovara subsp betavascularum was not discovered in Montana until 1998. When it first appeared, beet vascular necrosis caused individual farm yield loss ranging from 5–70% in Montana's Bighorn Valley. Today, yield losses from the disease are generally infrequent and patchy as most producers plant resistant varieties. Infection rate is generally low if resistant cultivars are chosen; however, warmer and wetter conditions can lead to higher than normal instance of disease

If infection does occur, bacterial root rots can not only cause economic losses in the field, but also can in storage and processing as well. In processing plants, rotten roots complicate slicing and the bacterially-produced slime can clog filters. This is especially problematic with late-infected beets which are generally harvested and processed along with healthy beets. The disease can also lower sugar-content which greatly reduces the quality
