= RG2 =

RG2 may refer to:

- 1983 RG2 (aka 10482 Dangrieser), a Main-belt asteroid
- a United Kingdom postcode covering the Reading area

Rg2 or rg2 may refer to:

- Ginsenoside Rg2, a bioactive molecule
- a chess move of a rook to g2
- RG-2, a starter pistol made by the Röhm Gesellschaft

RG-II may refer to:

- Rhamnogalacturonan II, a type of pectin
