= Leipnik-Lundenburger =

Austrian holding company

Leipnik-Lundenburger Invest Beteiligungs AG
- Industry: food industry sugar industry
- Founded: 1867
- Headquarters: Vienna, Austria
- Key people: Chairman Josef Pröll, Board Josef Pröll, Kurt J. Miesenböck, Michael Kafesie
- Number of employees: ca 3.600
- Website: www.lli.at

Leipnik-Lundenburger Invest Beteiligungs AG (LLI) is a holding company located in Vienna, Austria and primarily owned by Raiffeisen-Holding Niederösterreich-Wien reg.Gen.mbH (50.05% of shares) as well as by Raiffeisen Zentralbank Österreich (33.06% of shares). Further shareholders are Raiffeisen Versicherungen AG (7.98%), UNIQA Österreich Versicherungen AG (2.02%) and Rübenbauernbund für Niederösterreich und Wien reg.Gen.mbH (6.89%).

LLI is both the parent company of GoodMills Group, Europe’s largest wheat milling company, as well as café+co, a market leader in the coffee vending service industry in Central and Eastern Europe. Furthermore, LLI holds shares in Agrana Beteiligungs AG (11.2%), Südzucker AG (2.1%), BayWa AG (12.5%) as well as Casinos Austria AG Wien (11,3 %).

Josef Pröll is chairman of the executive board since July 2011. Kurt J. Miesenböck is a board member since 2007, Michael Kafesie since 2015.

== History ==
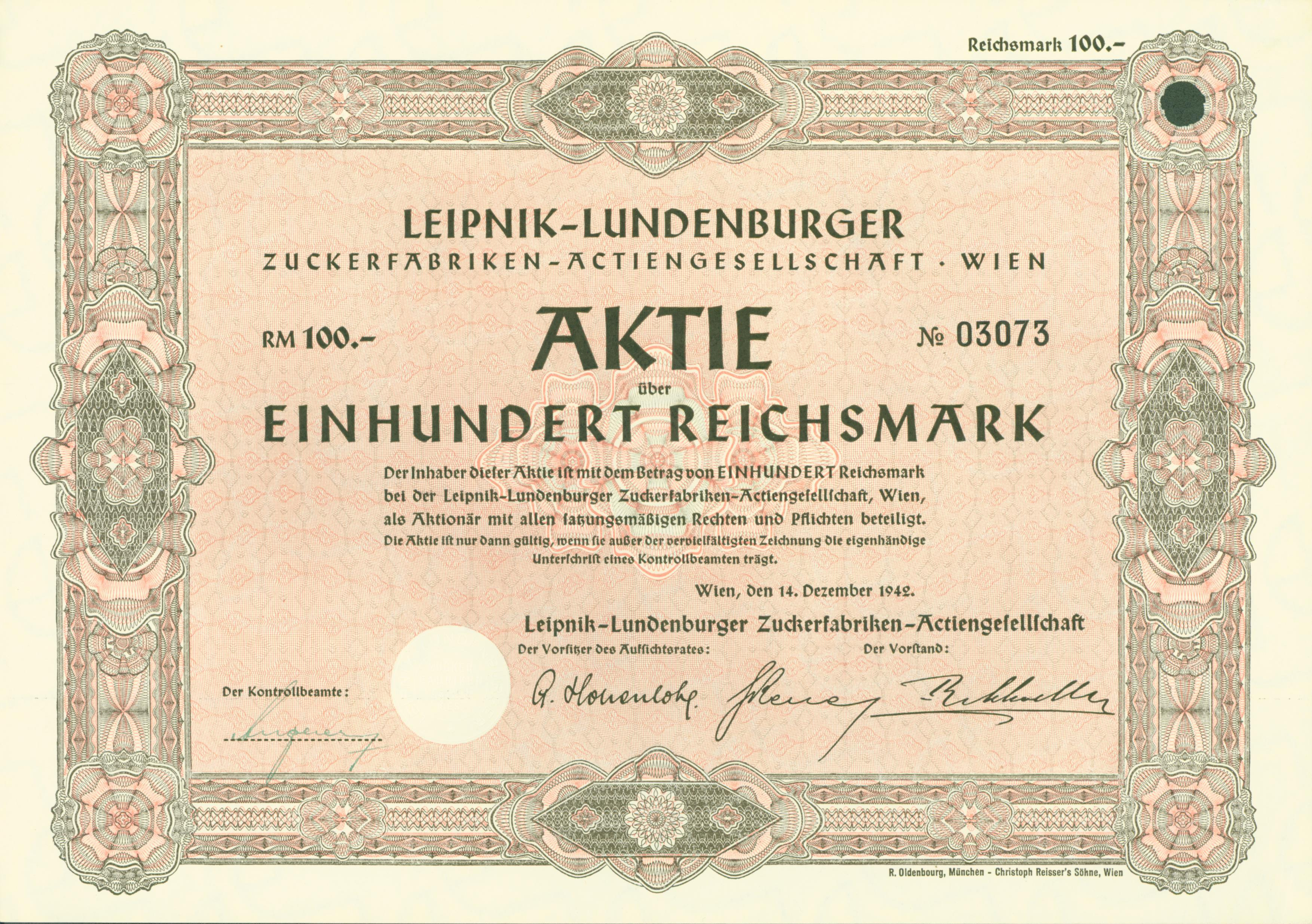
Share of the Leipnik-Lundenburger Zuckerfabriken-AG, issued 14 December 1942

LLI was founded in 1867 as Leipniker Rübenzucker AG (Leipnik Beet Sugar Corporation) in Leipnik, Moravia (today Czech Republic) by the industrialists Alfred Skene and Alexander von Schoeller and consolidated with other sugar plants to Leipnik Lundenburger Zuckerfabriken AG in 1871.

After its initial public offering (IPO) at the Vienna stock exchange in 1893, the company became one of the leading companies in the Austrian monarchy’s sugar industry.

After World War II the company began to diversify, reducing its sugar production exposure, while investing in the Austrian milling industry as well as the vending industry.

In 1977–78 the sugar plants of Hohenau, Leopoldsdorf and Dürnkrut were consolidated into the newly founded SUGANA Sugar Ges.m.b.H., which towards the end of 1979 was transformed into an incorporated company, with Schoeller Holding AG as the proprietor. Schoeller Holding AG itself was taken over by the cooperative bank Genossenschaftliche Zentralbank, today Raiffeisen Zentralbank (RZB) in 1979 and eventually in November 1989 rebranded to Agrana AG, with 11.2% of shares remaining with LLI as of today.

In 2001–02 LLI finally delisted from the stock market and expanded its activities to Central and Eastern Europe.

== Business activities ==
In 2013–14 LLI generated €1.0075 billion in revenues, where 84% of it was derived from its international operations. GoodMills Group’s turnover amounted to €842.9 million, whereas café+co revenues stood at €164.6 million. LLI presently employs over 3,600 employees at 47 locations.

Business activities are divided in three sectors: “Flour and Milling” with GoodMills Group, “Vending” with café+co and “Other” with equity stakes in Agrana, the BayWa-group, Casinos Austria-Group and Südzucker AG.

=== GoodMills Group GmbH ===
GoodMills Group GmbH, located in Vienna, oversees the activities of 25 mills in Austria, Germany, Poland, Czech Republic, Hungary, Romania and Bulgaria since 2007–08. Milling 2.7 million tonnes of grain and generating a turnover of €850 million in 2013–14, GoodMills Group is the flour milling industry leader in Europe. The company currently employs 2.300 employees.

=== café+co International Holding GmbH ===
café+co International Holding GmbH is the leading machine vending operator company in Austria and Central and Eastern Europe. Activities include the operation and service of vending machines for coffee, tea, beverages and snacks, as well as staff cafeterias. 17 international subcompanies service more than 70,000 catering stations. Next to Austria, the group operates in Germany, Poland, Serbia, Slovakia, Slovenia, Czech Republic and Hungary.

=== Other ===
In the third business segment, LLI holds shares of AGRANA Beteiligungs-AG, Südzucker AG, BayWa AG and Casinos Austria AG.

LLI owns 11.2% of the stock of Agrana, a public company founded 1988 as a holding corporation for the Austrian sugar and starch industry, which subsequently also added the business unit Fruit in 2013. AGRANA is listed on the Viennese Stock Exchange.

Südzucker AG is an international food company in the sugar sector, with business segments Sugar, CropEnergies, Specialties and Fruits. 2.1% of the shares are held by LLI. Südzucker is the market leader in the sugar industry in Europe.

LLI holds a 12.5% stake in listed BayWa AG, a globally-operating wholesale, retail and services enterprise founded in 1923 and located in Munich. Its activities encompass agricultural, construction and energy industries.

== See also ==
- Coffee vending machine
