= Henri Braconnot =

French chemist and pharmacist (1780–1855)

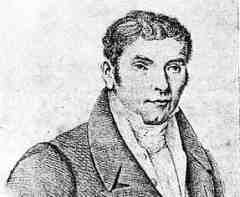
- Henri Braconnot
- Born: 29 May 1780; Commercy, France
- Died: 13 January 1855 (aged 74); Nancy, France
- Known for: discovered chitin and pectin
- Scientific career
- Fields: Chemistry, Pharmacy

Henri Braconnot (French: [ɑ̃ʁi bʁakɔno]; 29 May 1780 – 13 January 1855) was a French chemist and pharmacist.

He was born in Commercy, his father being a counsel at the local parliament. At the death of his father, in 1787, Henri began his instruction in an elementary school in Commercy and then with private teachers.

At 13, he was placed as apprentice in a pharmacy in Nancy where he learned and practiced pharmacy, chemistry, and botany. At 15, he left Nancy for a military service in a hospital in Strasbourg.

In 1801-1802, he lived in Paris where he learnt in various schools, Museum, school of medicine among others, and followed the lectures of Antoine François, comte de Fourcroy, Jean-Baptiste Lamarck and Étienne Geoffroy Saint-Hilaire. He carried out some chemical investigations on the composition of a fossil horn which were published later (J Chim Phys 1806).

From 1802 to his death, he lived in Nancy where he was named in 1807 as director of the botanical garden and member of the scientific academy of the town. He worked as a chemist until his death mainly on plant chemistry. He made several research studies of plant assimilation, organic acids, plant composition and fats. He made also minor contributions to mineralogy and hydrology.

He was elected in 1823 correspondent member of the Académie des Sciences in Paris. Until his death in 1855, he published 112 works.

In the fat domain, Braconnot described in 1815 that fats are formed of a solid part ("absolute tallow") and an oily compound ("absolute oil"), their consistency resulting from the proportions of the two parts. This conclusion was obtained after pressing fats in the cold between filter papers (Ann Chimie 1815, 93, 225). Furthermore, after saponification and acidification Braconnot separated a solid fraction similar to "adipocire" described by Fourcroy (1806). Unfortunately, he did not observe its acid properties which led Chevreul to discover in 1820 stearic acid.

As these data were similar to the first data obtained by Chevreul as soon as 1813, the later sent a letter to the journal Annales de Chimie claiming his priority and contesting the originality of Braconnot's work (Ann Chim 1815, 94, 73). As an application of his laboratory work, it occurred to Braconnot that the "absolute tallow" (similar to stearine) from beef or sheep could be used to make candles. He named that substance "céromimène" (wax-like). With Simonin F, a pharmacist in Nancy, he patented in 1818 a process of candle manufacture. An improved process using stearic acid was patented by Chevreul seven years later.

In the domain of plant chemistry, Braconnot contributed to the isolation and the description of several compounds, most of which were shown later to be mixtures of simpler products. Among others, Braconnot discovered gallic and ellagic acids (1818) and pyrogallic acid (pyrogallol) which later enabled the development of photography. He discovered also in 1811 chitin in mushrooms, the earliest known polysaccharide. In 1819, he published a memoir describing for the first time the conversion of wood, straw or cotton into a sugar by a sulfuric acid treatment. The name glucose was proposed 24 years later by Dumas for a sugar similarly obtained from starch, cellulose, or honey. By the same acid process, Braconnot obtained a "gelatin sugar" (named later glycocolle, now glycine) from gelatin and leucine from muscle fibers. Furthermore, reacting concentrated nitric acid on wood or cotton, Braconnot obtained a flammable product, xyloïdine (a precursor of collodion and nitrocellulose), which could be transformed into a vitreous varnish. This substance may be considered as the first polymer or plastic material created by a chemist.

In 1825, he discovered a structural heteropolysaccharide, pectin.
