= RG3 (disambiguation) =

RG3 is a nickname for Robert Griffin III, an American football quarterback.

RG3 may also refer to:

- 1991 RG3, an alternative name for the 48456 Wilhelmwien asteroid
- 1986 RG3, an alternative name for the 10498 Bobgent asteroid
- 1997 RG3, an alternative name for the 10211 La Spezia asteroid
- RG3, a postcode in the RG postcode area in England

RG-3 may refer to:

- RG-3, a type of the Lamborghini Gallardo

Rg3 may refer to:

- a chess move of a rook on the g3-square
