= Pectic acid =

Names
- Other names Pectate; Poly(1,4-α-D-galacturonate); α-D-Polygalacturonic acid

Identifiers
CAS Number	25249-06-3
UNII	VV3XD4CL04

Properties
Chemical formula	(C_{6}H_{8}O_{6})_{n}
Molar mass	Variable
- Except where otherwise noted, data are given for materials in their standard state (at 25 °C [77 °F], 100 kPa). verify (what is ?) Infobox references

Pectic acid, also known as polygalacturonic acid, is a water-soluble, transparent gelatinous acid existing in over-ripe fruit and some vegetables. It is a product of pectin degradation in plants, and is produced via the interaction between pectinase and pectin (the latter being common in the wine-making industry.) In the early stage of development of fruits, the pectic substance is a water-insoluble protopectin which is converted into pectin by the enzyme protopectinase during ripening of fruit. In over-ripe fruits, due to the presence of pectic methyl esterase enzyme, the pectin gets largely converted to pectic acid which is water-insoluble. Due to this reason both immature and over-ripe fruits are not suitable for making jelly and only ripe fruits are used.
