= RNG =

Rng or RNG may refer to:

== Science, technology, and mathematics ==
- Random number generator
- Relative neighborhood graph, an undirected graph used in computational geometry
- RELAX NG, an XML schema language whose files use the extension .rng
- Rng (algebra), an algebraic structure similar to rings but without a multiplicative identity
- Renewable natural gas, a methane-enriched biogas

== Transport ==
- Ranggung LRT station, Singapore (LTA code: RNG)
- Raniganj railway station, India (Indian Railways code: RNG)

== Other uses ==
- University of Reading Herbarium
- Ramnath Goenka Excellence in Journalism Awards (RNG Awards)
- R'n'G, a Dutch hip-hop duo
- Royal Never Give Up, a Chinese esports team
- R&G (Rhythm & Gangsta): The Masterpiece 2004 studio album by Snoop Dogg
- Ronga language (ISO 639-3 code: rng)
- RingCentral, an American company (NYSE code: RNG)
