= Rhamnogalacturonan-II =

Complex polysaccharide component

Structure of rhamnogalacturonan II in SNFG format

Rhamnogalacturonan II (RG-II) is a complex polysaccharide component of pectin that is found in the primary cell walls of dicotyledonous and monocotyledonous plants and gymnosperms. It is supposed to be crucial for the plant cell wall integrity. RG-II is also likely to be present in the walls of some lower plants (ferns, horsetails, and lycopods). Its global structure is conserved across vascular plants, albeit a number of variations within the RG-II side chains have been observed between different plants. RG-II is composed of 12 different glycosyl residues including D-rhamnose, D-apiose, D-galactose, L-galactose, Kdo, D-galacturonic acid, L-arabinose, D-xylose, and L-aceric acid, linked together by at least 21 distinct glycosidic linkages. Some resides are further modified via methylation and acetylation. It moreover supports borate mediated cross-linking between different RG-II side-chain apiosyl residues. The backbone consists of a linear polymer of alpha-1,4-linked D-galactopyranosiduronic acid. RG-II can be isolated from different sources, such as apple juice and red wine.

The gut bacterium Bacteroides thetaiotaomicron has a polysaccharide utilization locus that contains enzymes that allows deconstruction of rhamnogalacturonan-II, cleaving all but 1 of its 21 distinct glycosidic linkages.

== See also ==
- Pectin
