= Pectinase =

Class of enzymes

Endopolygalacturonase I

Identifiers
- Organism: Aspergillus niger
- Symbol: pgaI
- Orthologs: OMA: entry
- UniProt: P26213

Other data
- EC number: 3.2.1.15
Search for
- Structures: Swiss-model
- Domains: InterPro

Pectinases are a group of enzymes that breaks down pectin, a polysaccharide found in plant cell walls, through hydrolysis, transelimination and deesterification reactions. Commonly referred to as pectic enzymes, they include pectolyase, pectozyme, and polygalacturonase, one of the most studied and widely used commercial pectinases. It is useful because pectin is the jelly-like matrix which helps cement plant cells together and in which other cell wall components, such as cellulose fibrils, are embedded. Therefore, pectinase enzymes are commonly used in processes involving the degradation of plant materials, such as speeding up the extraction of fruit juice from fruit, including apples and sapota. Pectinases have also been used in wine production since the 1960s. The function of pectinase in brewing is twofold, first it helps break down the plant (typically fruit) material and so helps the extraction of flavors from the mash. Secondly the presence of pectin in finished wine causes a haze or slight cloudiness. Pectinase is used to break this down and so clear the wine.

Pectinases can be extracted from fungi such as Aspergillus niger. The fungus produces these enzymes to break down the middle lamella in plants so that it can extract nutrients from the plant tissues and insert fungal hyphae. If pectinase is boiled it is denatured (unfolded) making it harder to connect with the pectin at the active site, and produce as much juice.

== Characterizations ==
Pectinase is a generic term used for a group of enzymes that catalyse the degradation of pectin by hydrolysis, trans-elimination, as well as de-esterification reactions. The degradation of pectic polymers is mainly caused by exo- and endo-polygalacturonases (exo- and endo-PGs), pectate and pectin lyases (PLs), pectin methylesterase (PME) and acetylesterase (PAE), β-galactosidase (β-Gal), and α-L-arabinofuranosidase (α-L-Af), among others.

- Endo-polygalacturonase (E.C. 3.2.1.15) is known to be the most important enzyme responsible for pectic depolymerization and solubilization. This enzyme hydrolyses the α-1 → 4 glycosidic bonds of the methyl de-esterified homogalacturonan backbone. The enzyme randomly attacks its substrate and produces a number of D-GalA oligosaccharides.
- Exo-polygalacturonase (E.C. 3.2.1.67 and E.C. 3.2.1.82) attacks the substrate from the non-reducing end and is able to remove terminally (1→)–linked D-GalA residues from homogalacturonan chains. The enzyme requires a non-esterified D-GalA unit at subsites −2, −1, and + 1 and is tolerant for xylose substitution (able to remove a D-GalA-Xyl dimer), hence XGA is also an exo-polygalacturonase substrate.
- PLs (pectate lyases, E.C. 4.2.2.2, and pectin lyases, E.C. 4.2.2.10) act through the β-elimination of methyl esterified homogalacturonan in the presence of Ca^{2+}, Mn^{2+}, or Ni^{2+}.
- PME (E.C. 3.1.1.11) and PAE (E.C. 3.1.1.6) de-esterifies homogalacturonan chains by removing the methoxyl and acetyl residues, respectively. It decreases the degree of pectin methylation thereby providing suitable conditions for the hydrolysis of the α-1 → 4 link in the homogalacturonan backbone by polygalacturonase. The degradation of rhamnogalacturonans (RGs) involves the participation of numerous enzymes.
- RG hydrolase (RGH, E.C. 3.2.1.171) hydrolyses the α-D-1 → 4-D-GalA-α-L-1 → 2-Rha linkage in the RG-I backbone, leaving Rha at the non-reducing side. RG lyase (RGL, E.C. 4.2.2.23) hydrolyses RG-I α-L-1 → 2-Rha-α-D-1 → 4-GalA backbone leaving a 4-deoxy- β -L-threo-hex-4-enepyranosyluronic acid (unsaturated GalA) group at the non-reducing end.
- RG rhamnohydrolase (RGRH, E.C. 3.2.1.174) is an exo-acting pectinase, which possesses the specificity to release terminal rhamnosyl residues (1 → 4)-linked to α-galacturonosyl residues.
- RG galacturonohydrolase (RGGH, E.C. 3.2.1.173) is able to release a GalA moiety connected to a rha residue from the non-reducing side of RG-I chains but is unable to liberate GalA from homogalacturonan.
- β-Gal (E.C. 3.2.1.23) and α-L-Af (E.C. 3.2.1.55) are two enzymes responsible for removing galactosyl and arabinosyl residues from the RG-I backbone, respectively, while the acetyl groups are liberated by the action of RG acetylesterase (RGAE, E.C. 3.1.1.86).

The following table shows a summary of enzymes involved in pectin degradation. HG-PUL = homogalacturonan polysaccharide utilization loci; RG-I PUL = rhamnogalacturonan I polysaccharide utilization loci.

| PUL | CAZyme families | EC number | Accepted name | Reaction |
|---|---|---|---|---|
| HG-PUL | PL1 | EC4.2.2.2 | Pectate lyase | Eliminative cleavage of (1 → 4)-α-D-galacturonan to give oligosaccharides with 4-deoxy-α-D-galact-4-enuronosyl groups at their non-reducing ends |
| HG-PUL | PL1 | EC4.2.2.10 | Pectin lyase | Eliminative cleavage of (1 → 4)-α-D-galacturonan methyl ester to give oligosaccharides with 4-deoxy-6-O-methyl-α-D-galact-4-enuronosyl groups at their non-reducing ends |
| HG-PUL | GH28 | EC3.2.1.67 | Galacturonan 1,4-α-galacturonidase | [(1 → 4)-α-D-galacturonide]n + H2O = [(1 → 4)-α-D-galacturonide]n-1 + D-galacturonate |
| HG-PUL | GH28 | EC3.2.1.82 | Exo-poly-α-digalacturonosidase | [(1 → 4)-α-D-galacturonosyl]n + H2O = α-D-galacturonosyl-(1 → 4)-D-galacturonate + [(1 → 4)-α-D-galacturonosyl]n-2 |
| HG-PUL | GH28 | EC3.2.1.15 | Endo-polygalacturonase | (1,4-α-D-galacturonosyl)n+m + H2O = (1,4-α-D-galacturonosyl)n + (1,4-α-D-galacturonosyl)m |
| HG-PUL | CE8 | EC3.1.1.11 | Pectinesterase | Pectin + n H2O = n methanol + pectate |
| HG-PUL | CE4 | EC3.1.1.6 | Acetylesterase | An acetic ester + H2O = an alcohol + acetate |
| RG-I PUL | PL9 | EC4.2.2.23 | Rhamnogalacturonan endolyase | Endotype eliminative cleavage of L-α-rhamnopyranosyl-(1 → 4)-α-D-galactopyranosyluronic acid bonds of rhamnogalacturonan I domains in ramified hairy regions of pectin leaving L-rhamnopyranose at the reducing end and 4-deoxy-4,5-unsaturated D-galactopyranosyluronic acid at the non-reducing end |
| RG-I PUL | GH28 | EC3.2.1.171 | Rhamnogalacturonan hydrolase | Endohydrolysis of α-D-GalA-(1 → 2)-α-L-Rha glycosidic bond in the rhamnogalacturonan I backbone with initial inversion of anomeric configuration releasing oligosaccharides with β-D-GalA at the reducing end. |
| RG-I PUL | GH2 | EC3.2.1.146 | β-Galactofuranosidase | Hydrolysis of terminal non-reducing β-D-galactofuranosides, releasing galactose |
| RG-I PUL | GH138 | EC3.2.1.173 | Rhamnogalacturonan galacturonohydrolase | Exohydrolysis of the α-D-GalA-(1 → 2)-α-L-Rha bond in rhamnogalacturonan oligosaccharides with initial inversion of configuration releasing D-galacturonic acid from the non-reducing end of rhamnogalacturonan oligosaccharides |
| RG-I PUL | GH105 | EC3.2.1.172 | Unsaturated rhamnogalacturonyl hydrolase | 2-O-(4-deoxy-β-L-threo-hex-4-enopyranuronosyl)-α-L-rhamnopyranose + H2O = 5-dehydro-4-deoxy-D-glucuronate + L-rhamnopyranose |
| RG-I PUL | GH106 | EC3.2.1.174 | Rhamnogalacturonan rhamnohydrolase | Exohydrolysis of the α-L-Rha-(1 → 4)-α-D-GalA bond in rhamnogalacturonan oligosaccharides with initial inversion of configuration releasing β-L-rhamnose from the non-reducing end of rhamnogalacturonan oligosaccharides |
| RG-I PUL | GH43 | EC3.2.1.99 | Arabinan endo-1,5-α-L-arabinanase | Endohydrolysis of (1 → 5)-α-arabinofuranosidic linkages in (1 → 5)-arabinans |
| RG-I PUL | GH51 | EC3.2.1.55 | Non-reducing end α-L-arabinofuranosidase | Hydrolysis of terminal non-reducing α-L-arabinofuranoside residues in α-L-arabinosides |
| RG-I PUL | GH146 | EC3.2.1.185 | Non-reducing end β-L-arabinofuranosidase | β-L-arabinofuranosyl-(1 → 2)-β-L-arabinofuranose + H2O = 2 β-L-arabinofuranose |
| RG-I PUL | GH53 | EC3.2.1.89 | Arabinogalactan endo-β-1,4-galactanase | The enzyme specifically hydrolyses (1 → 4)-β-D-galactosidic linkages in type I arabinogalactans |
| RG-I PUL | GH43 | EC3.2.1.145 | Galactan 1,3-β-galactosidase | Hydrolysis of terminal, non-reducing β-D-galactose residues in (1 → 3)-β-D-galactopyranans |
| RG-I PUL | GH27 | EC3.2.1.88 | Non-reducing end β-L-arabinopyranosidase | Removal of a terminal β-L-arabinopyranose residue from the non-reducing end of its substrate |
| RG-I PUL | GH43 | EC3.2.1.181 | Galactan endo-β-1,3-galactanase | The enzyme specifically hydrolyses β-1,3-galactan and β-1,3-galactooligosaccharides |
| RG-I PUL | CE12 | EC3.1.1.86 | Rhamnogalacturonan acetylesterase | Hydrolytic cleavage of 2-O-acetyl- or 3-O-acetyl groups of α-D-galacturonic acid in rhamnogalacturonan I. |
| RG-II PUL | GH43 | EC3.2.1.55 | Non-reducing end α-L-arabinofuranosidase | Hydrolysis of terminal non-reducing α-L-arabinofuranoside residues in α-L-arabinosides |
| RG-II PUL | CE19 | EC3.1.1.11 | Pectinesterase | Pectin + n H2O = n methanol + pectate |
| RG-II PUL | GH142 | EC3.2.1.185 | Non-reducing end β-L-arabinofuranosidase | β-L-arabinofuranosyl-(1 → 2)-β-L-arabinofuranose + H2O = 2 β-L-arabinofuranose |
| RG-II PUL | GH78 | EC3.2.1.40 | α-L-Rhamnosidase | Hydrolysis of terminal non-reducing α-L-rhamnose residues in α-L-rhamnosides |
| RG-II PUL | GH33 | EC3.2.1.124 | 3-deoxy-2-Octulosonidase | Endohydrolysis of the β-ketopyranosidic linkages of 3-deoxy-D-manno-2-octulosonate in capsular polysaccharides |
| RG-II PUL | GH95 | EC3.2.1.63 | 1,2-α-L-Fucosidase | Methyl-2-α-L-fucopyranosyl-β-D-galactoside + H2O = L-fucose + methyl β-D-galactoside |
| RG-II PUL | GH2 | EC3.2.1.31 | β-Glucuronidase | a β-D-glucuronoside + H2O = D-glucuronate + an alcohol |
| RG-II PUL | GH2 | EC3.2.1.23 | β-galactosidase | Hydrolysis of terminal non-reducing β-D-galactose residues in β-D-galactosides |
| RG-II PUL | GH138 | EC3.2.1.173 | Rhamnogalacturonan galacturonohydrolase | Exohydrolysis of the α-D-GalA-(1 → 2)-α-L-Rha bond in rhamnogalacturonan oligosaccharides with initial inversion of configuration releasing D-galacturonic acid from the non-reducing end of rhamnogalacturonan oligosaccharides |
| RG-II PUL | GH141 | EC3.2.1.51 | | |

== Properties ==
=== Crystal structures ===
All pectinase enzyme structures include a prism-shaped right-handed cylinder made up of seven to nine parallel β-helices. The three parallel β-helices that create the prism shape of the structure are referred to as PB1, PB2 and PB3, with PB1 and PB2 creating an antiparallel β and PB3 sitting perpendicularly to PB2. All substrate binding sites of the various esterases, hydrolases, and lyases are located on an outer cleft of the central parallel β-helix structure between protruding loops on the structure and PB1.

=== Optimum environment ===
As with all enzymes, pectinases have an optimum temperature and pH at which they are most active. For example, a commercial pectinase might typically be activated at 45 to 55 °C and work well at a pH of 3.0 to 6.5.

== Reaction pathway ==
Pectinases depolymerise pectin through hydrolysis, trans-elimination and deesterification reaction processes, breaking down the ester bond that holds together the carboxyl and methyl groups in pectin.

Endo-polygalacturonase progresses through a reaction along the following pathway:

(1,4-alpha-D-galacturonosyl)_{n+m} + H_{2}O = (1,4-alpha-D-galacturonosyl)_{n} + (1,4-alpha-D-galacturonosyl)_{m}

== Occurrence and Application ==
=== Pectinase in nature ===
Pectinase enzymes used today are naturally produced by fungi and yeasts (50%), insects, bacteria and microbes (35%) and various plants (15%), but cannot be synthesized by animal or human cells. In plants, pectinase enzymes hydrolyze pectin that is found in the cell wall, allowing for new growth and changes to be made. The chemical and structural properties of pectin is especially prone to changes in the fruit due to solubilization and enzymatic degradation which are considered to be the key processes responsible for the softening of fruit during ripening. Structural changes that occur in the middle lamella and primary cell wall during ripening result in cell separation and softening of the tissues. The molecular components of primary walls are modified during fruit ripening by the temporally and spatially regulated action of endogenous enzymes.

Similarly to their role in plants, pectinases break down pectin during the developmental stage of fungi.

=== Industrial uses ===
Pectinase enzymes play various roles in both the fruit juice and wine industries. They are used for clarification in fruit juices and also speed up fruit juice extraction through enzymatic liquefaction of fruit pulp. In addition, pectinase enzymes aid in formation of pulpy products in the fruit juice industry. Pectinase enzymes are used for extracting juice from purée. This is done when the enzyme pectinase breaks down the substrate pectin and the juice is extracted. The enzyme pectinase lowers the activation energy needed for the juice to be produced and catalyzes the reaction.

Pectinases are useful in the wine industry by extracting anthocyanin from the fruit, effectively intensifying the wine coloring. Pectinase can also be used to extract juices from cell walls of plants cells.

Pectinases are also used for retting in the textile industry. Addition of chelating agents or pretreatment of the plant material with acid enhance the effect of the enzyme.
