= Pectin =

Structural carbohydrate in the cell walls of land plants and some algae

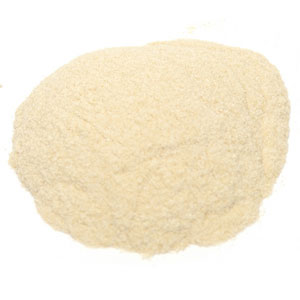
Commercially produced powder of pectin, extracted from citrus fruits

Pectin (Ancient Greek: πηκτικός pēktikós: 'congealed' and 'curdled') is a heteropolysaccharide, a structural polymer contained in the cell walls and middle lamellae of terrestrial plants. The principal chemical component of pectin is galacturonic acid (a sugar acid derived from galactose). Commercially produced pectin is a white-to-light-brown powder, produced from citrus fruits for use as an edible gelling agent, especially in jams and jellies, dessert fillings, medications, and sweets.

== Biology ==
=== Natural occurrence ===
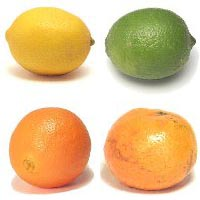
The peels of citrus fruits naturally contain large amounts of pectin.

Pectin was isolated and described by Henri Braconnot in 1825.He showed that it was present in the leaves, stems and fruits of many plants. Pears, apples, guavas, quince, plums, gooseberries, and oranges and other citrus fruits contain large amounts of pectin, while soft fruits, like cherries, grapes, and strawberries, contain smaller amounts.

Typical levels of pectin in fresh fruits and vegetables are:

- Apples, 1–1.5%
- Apricots, 1%
- Cherries, 0.4%
- Oranges, 0.5–3.5%
- Carrots 1.4%
- Citrus peels, 30%
- Rose hips, 15%

Pectin is composed of complex polysaccharides that are present in the primary cell walls of a plant, and are abundant in the green parts of terrestrial plants. Pectin is the principal component of the middle lamella, where it binds cells. Pectin is deposited by exocytosis into the cell wall via vesicles produced in the Golgi apparatus. The amount, structure and chemical composition of pectin is different among plants, within a plant over time, and in various parts of a plant. Pectin is an important cell wall polysaccharide that allows primary cell wall extension and plant growth. During fruit ripening, pectin is broken down by the enzymes pectinase and pectinesterase, in which process the fruit becomes softer as the middle lamellae break down and cells become separated from each other. A similar process of cell separation caused by the breakdown of pectin occurs in the abscission zone of the petioles of deciduous plants at leaf fall.

=== Human nutrition ===
Pectin is a natural part of the human diet and although not digested in the small intestine, it is fermented in the large intestine. It has a positive effect on decreasing overall LDL cholesterol levels as well as lowering post-prandial glucose levels. The daily intake of pectin from fruits and vegetables can be estimated to be around 5 g if approximately 500 g of fruits and vegetables are consumed per day.

In human digestion, pectin binds to cholesterol in the gastrointestinal tract and slows glucose absorption by trapping carbohydrates. Pectin is thus a soluble dietary fiber. In non-obese diabetic (NOD) mice pectin has been shown to increase the incidence of autoimmune type 1 diabetes.

A study found that, after consumption of fruit, the concentration of methanol in the human body increased by as much as an order of magnitude due to the degradation of natural pectin (which is esterified with methanol) in the colon.

Consumption of pectin has been shown to slightly (3–7%) reduce blood LDL cholesterol levels. The effect depends upon the source of pectin; apple and citrus pectins were more effective than orange pulp fibre pectin. The mechanism appears to be an increase of viscosity in the intestinal tract, leading to a reduced absorption of cholesterol from bile or food. In the large intestine and colon, microorganisms degrade pectin and liberate short-chain fatty acids that have a positive prebiotic effect.

=== Other ===
Pectin has been observed to have some function in repairing the DNA of some types of plant seeds, usually desert plants. Pectinaceous surface pellicles, which are rich in pectin, create a mucilage layer that holds in dew that helps the cell repair its DNA.

== Chemistry ==
=== Definition and structure ===
Pectin is a heteropolysaccharide with a high proportion of D-galacturonic acid (≈ 65%) in its repeat units. As the polymer's main chain contains α-L-rhamnose in addition to galacturonic acid, the systematic name for pectin is rhamno-galacturonic acid. The incorporation of rhamnose units disrupts the otherwise linear poly(galacturonic acid) chain, introducing bends (or "kinks"). Many rhamnose units in pectin carry oligomeric side chains of neutral sugars such as arabinose, galactose, or xylose. These branched sections are referred to as "hairy" regions, while the unbranched stretches composed mainly of galacturonic acid are termed "smooth" regions. In further detail, the hairy and smooth regions can be divided into distinct structural domains (that exist within the same pectin molecule): Smooth regions comprise homogalacturonan (HG), xylogalacturonan (XGA), and apiogalacturonan (APGA), while the hairy regions are made up of rhamnogalacturonan I (RG-I) and rhamnogalacturonan II (RG-II).

The carboxyl groups of polygalacturonic acid are frequently esterified with methanol or acetic acid. The degree of esterification and acetylation varies depending on the source of the pectin and has a decisive impact on its chemical properties. Pectins are therefore classified according to their degree of methylation (DM) and degree of acetylation (DA), which represent the ratio of esterified galacturonic acids (methylated or acetylated) to total galacturonic acids. Functionally, three types of pectins are distinguished:

- Pectic acids: degree of methylation less than 5% (DM<5)
- Weakly methylated (LM) pectins: degree of methylation less than 50% (DM<50)
- Highly methylated (HM) pectins: degree of methylation greater than 50% (DM>50)

Amidated pectin shows enhanced tolerance to varying calcium concentrations. Thiolated pectin, capable of forming disulfide crosslinks, exhibits superior gelling properties beneficial for pharmaceutical and food applications.

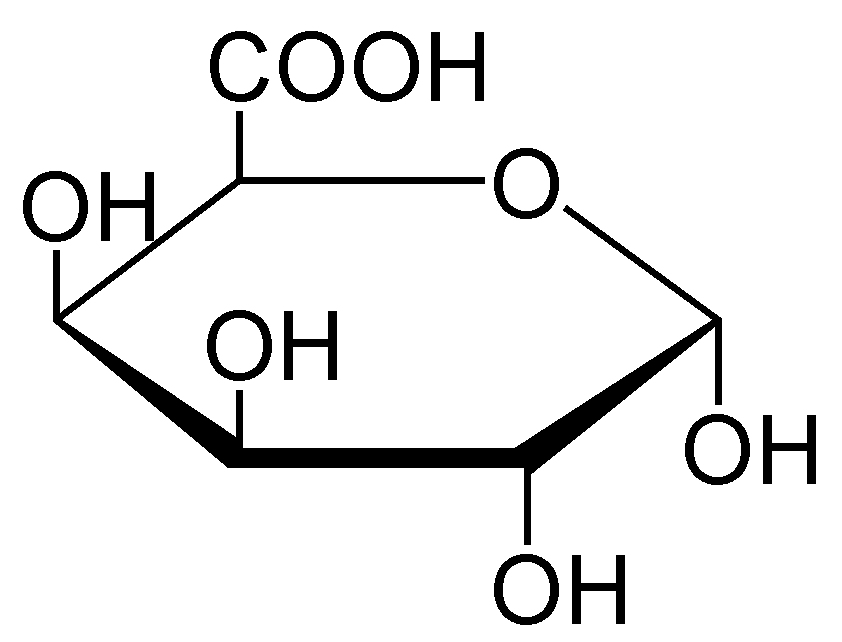
Main chain monomer: Galacturonic acid (GalA; a sugar acid)

Main chain monomer: Rhamnose (Rha)

Side chain monomer: Galactose (Gal)

Side chain monomer: Arabinose (Ara)

Side chain monomer: Xylose (Xyl)

Structural features of various pectins

Section of the pectin main chain:
Poly-α-(1→4)-galacturonic acid.

Partially esterified section of the pectin main chain

Rhamnogalacturonan: backbone with a "kink"
due to incorporated rhamnose

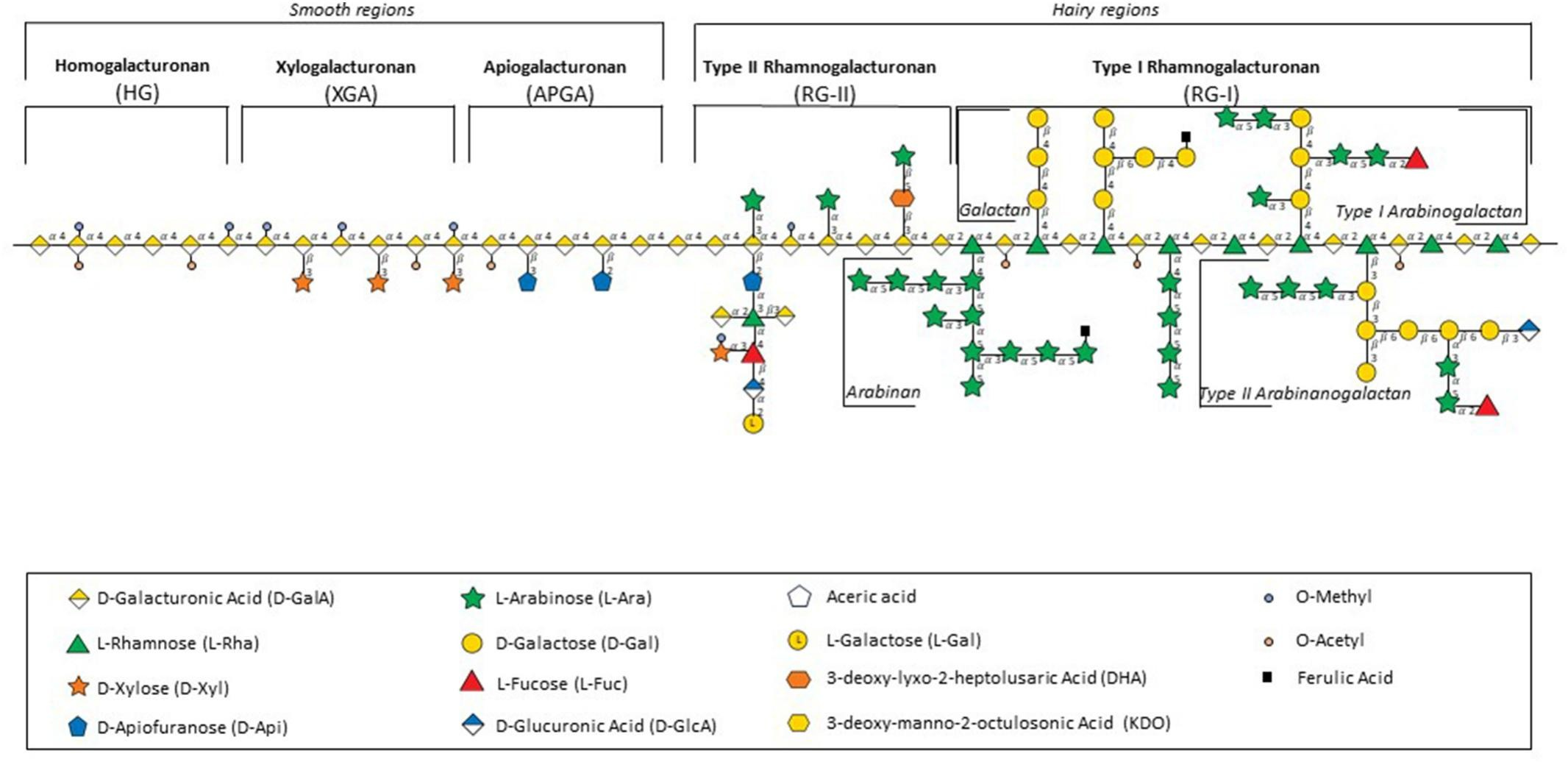

==== Structural domains ====
Pectin has alternating 'smooth' and 'hairy' regions, with the 'hairy' regions representing the branched rhamnogalacturonan I and rhamnogalacturonan II, and the 'smooth' regions corresponding to the linear homogalacturonan backbone. More specifically, pectin consists of different galacturonic acid–containing domains—mainly homogalacturonan (HG), rhamnogalacturonan I (RG-I), and rhamnogalacturonan II (RG-II)—which differ in their sugar composition and linkage patterns. Additionally, xylogalacturonan (XGA) and apiogalacturonan (APGA) are often considered to be pectin because they have the same backbone as homogalacturonan.

Homogalacturonan is a linear homopolymer of α-(1 → 4)-linked D-galacturonic acid residues that comprises ~65 % of pectin. Generally, homogalacturonan comprises D-galacturonic acid residues monomers in long stretches of at least 72 to 100 residues linked together.

Rhamnogalacturonan I is a repeating disaccharide of [→4-α-D-GalA-(1 → 2)-α-L-Rha-(1→], i. e. an alternating copolymer of galacturonic acid and rhammnose, with many O-4 positions containing other neutral sugars, such as D-galactose or L-arabinose. The length of the backbone of rhamnogalacturonan I is about 100 to 300 repeating units. Side chains varying by plant sources, such as arabinan, β-(1 → 4)-galactan, type I arabinogalactan (AG-I), and type II arabinogalactan (AG-II) exist. Arabinan consist of α-(1 → 5)-linked L-arabinose backbone, which is usually substituted with α-L-arabinose in different linkages. AG-I is composed out of a β-(1 → 4)-linked D-galactose backbone with α-L-arabinose residues attached to the O-3 position. The terminal galactose of β-(1 → 4) galactan is frequently linked to L-arabinose by α-(1 → 5) glycoside bonds. Type II arabinogalactan is composed of a β-(1 → 3)-linked D-Gal backbone, containing short side chains of α-L-Ara-(1 → 6)-[β-D-Gal-(1 → 6)]n. The galactosyl residues of the side chains can be substituted with α-(1 → 3)-linked L-arabinose residues. Type II arabinogalactan is mainly associated with proteins (3–8 %), so called arabinogalactan proteins (AGPs), which are rich in proline/hydroxyproline, alanine, serine, and threonine. D-galacturonic acid residues residues in the backbone of rhamnogalacturonan I may be highly O-acylated on O-2 and/or O-3, but they are not usually methyl esterified. Ferulic acid groups in rhamnogalacturonan I may be ester-linked to O-2 of the arabinose residues and to O-6 of the galactose residues.

Another structural type of pectin is rhamnogalacturonan II (RG-II), which is a less frequent, complex, highly branched polysaccharide. Rhamnogalacturonan II is classified by some authors within the group of substituted galacturonans since the rhamnogalacturonan II backbone is made exclusively of D-galacturonic acid units.

=== Molecular weight ===
The molecular weight of isolated pectine greatly varies by the source and the method of isolation. Values have been reported as low as 28 kDa for apple pomace up to 753 kDa for sweet potato peels.

=== Substitutions ===
In nature, around 80 percent of carboxyl groups of galacturonic acid are esterified with methanol. This proportion is decreased to a varying degree during pectin extraction. Pectins are classified as high- versus low-methoxy pectins (short HM-pectins versus LM-pectins), with more or less than half of all the galacturonic acid esterified. The ratio of esterified to non-esterified galacturonic acid determines the behaviour of pectin in food applications – HM-pectins can form a gel under acidic conditions in the presence of high sugar concentrations, while LM-pectins form gels by interaction with divalent cations, particularly Ca^{2+}, according to the idealized 'egg box' model, in which ionic bridges are formed between calcium ions and the ionised carboxyl groups of the galacturonic acid.

The non-esterified galacturonic acid units can be either free acids (carboxyl groups) or salts with sodium, potassium, or calcium. The salts of partially esterified pectins are called pectinates; if the degree of esterification is below 5 percent the salts are called pectates, the insoluble acid form, pectic acid.

Some plants, such as sugar beet, potatoes and pears, contain pectins with acetylated galacturonic acid in addition to methyl esters. Acetylation prevents gel-formation but increases the stabilising and emulsifying effects of pectin.

Amidated pectin is a modified form of pectin. Here, some of the galacturonic acid is converted with ammonia to carboxylic acid amide. These pectins are more tolerant of varying calcium concentrations that occur in use.

Thiolated pectin exhibits substantially improved gelling properties since this thiomer is able to crosslink via disulfide bond formation. These high gelling properties are advantageous for various pharmaceutical applications and applications in food industry.

Amidated pectins behave like low-ester pectins but need less calcium and are more tolerant of excess calcium. Also, gels from amidated pectin are thermoreversible; they can be heated and after cooling solidify again, whereas conventional pectin-gels will afterwards remain liquid.

=== Gelation ===
In high-methoxy pectins at soluble solids content above 60% and a pH value between 2.8 and 3.6, hydrogen bonds and hydrophobic interactions bind the individual pectin chains together. These bonds form as water is bound by sugar and forces pectin strands to stick together. These form a three-dimensional molecular net that creates the macromolecular gel. The gelling-mechanism is called a low-water-activity gel or sugar-acid-pectin gel.

While low-methoxy pectins need calcium to form a gel, they can do so at lower soluble solids and higher pH than high-methoxy pectins. Normally low-methoxy pectins form gels with a range of pH from 2.6 to 7.0 and with a soluble solids content between 10 and 70%.

To prepare a pectin-gel, the ingredients are heated, dissolving the pectin. Upon cooling below gelling temperature, a gel starts to form. If gel formation is too strong, syneresis or a granular texture are the result, while weak gelling leads to excessively soft gels.

High-ester pectins set at higher temperatures than low-ester pectins. However, gelling reactions with calcium increase as the degree of esterification falls. Similarly, lower pH-values or higher soluble solids (normally sugars) increase gelling speeds. Suitable pectins can therefore be selected for jams and jellies, or for higher-sugar confectionery jellies.

=== Pectinase ===
Pectinase is a group of enzymes that break down pectin. Pectin contributes to cell adhesion and wall rigidity; pectinases thereby play a role in softening plant tissues when hydrolyzing the glycosidic bonds in pectin. Pectinase occurs naturally in many microorganisms, including bacteria and fungi, and is also produced by plants as part of normal growth, fruit ripening and plant decay processes.

Industrially, pectinase is widely used in the food industry to clarify fruit juices and wines, enhance juice extraction, and improve the texture of fruit-based products. It is also applied in textile processing, paper production, and wastewater treatment due to its ability to break down plant-derived materials efficiently.

== Production ==
The main raw materials for pectin production are dried citrus peels (85%) or apple pomace (14%), both by-products of juice production. Pomace from sugar beets is also used to a small extent (0.5%).

The conventional pectin production method uses hot acidified water extraction, followed by filtration, alcohol precipitation, washing, and drying. This process is robust and established at large scale, but requires significant amounts of mineral acid and organic solvents and may cause partial degradation of the polymer structure (protopectin loses some of its branching).

Alternative "green" extraction methods have been developed to address these limitations. Such approaches aim to improve yield and functionality while reducing chemical and energy inputs. Although many of these methods remain at laboratory or pilot scale, they are the subject of ongoing research into sustainable pectin production.

=== Conventional solvent extraction method ===
Conventional pectin extraction from plant materials such as citrus peels and apple pomace involves the following steps:

- Pretreatment: washing, chopping, or drying the plant material to remove impurities and increase surface area.
- Acid extraction: heating the material in dilute acid (usually mineral or organic) to solubilize the pectin.
- Separation: removing solid residues by filtration or centrifugation.
- Precipitation: adding alcohol (ethanol or isopropanol) to recover pectin from the solution.
- Drying: collecting and drying the pectin to obtain a powder.
- Optional modifications: adjusting the chemical properties (e.g., de-esterification) to achieve specific functional characteristics.

=== Green extraction methods ===
- Enzyme-assisted extraction (EAE) — uses pectinases, cellulases or hemicellulases to release pectin at milder pH/temperature; can increase yield and preserve certain side chains, but enzyme selectivity matters. Often combined with ultrasound or microwaves.
- Ultrasound-assisted extraction (UAE) — cavitations support mass transfer; reduces time and temperature. Can be combined with enzymes (UA-EAE) or microwaves.
- Microwave-assisted extraction (MAE) and microwave-hydrothermal (MAHE) — fast heating, short extraction times; can give high yields but needs optimization to avoid degradation.

== Uses ==
The main use for pectin is as a gelling agent, thickening agent and stabiliser in food.

In some countries, pectin is also available as a solution or an extract, or as a blended powder, for home jam making.

The classical application is giving the jelly-like consistency to jams or marmalades, which would otherwise be sweet juices. Pectin also reduces syneresis in jams and marmalades and increases the gel strength of low-calorie jams. For household use, pectin is an ingredient in gelling sugar (also known as "jam sugar") where it is diluted to the right concentration with sugar and some citric acid to adjust pH.

For various food applications, different kinds of pectins can be distinguished by their properties, such as acidity, degree of esterification, relative number of methoxyl groups in the molecules, etc. For instance, the term "high methoxyl" refers to pectins that have a large proportion of the carboxyl groups in the pectin molecule that are esterified with methanol, compared to low methoxyl pectins:

- high methoxyl pectins are defined as those with a degree of esterification equal to or above 50, are typically used in traditional jam and jelly making; such pectins require high sugar concentrations and acidic conditions to form gels, and provide a smooth texture and suitable to be used in bakery fillings and confectionery applications;
- low methoxyl pectins have a degree of esterification of less than 50, can be either amidated or non-amidated: the percentage level of substitution of the amide group, defined as the degree of amidation, defines the efficacy of a pectin; low methoxyl pectins can provide a range of textures and rheological properties, depending on the calcium concentration and the calcium reactivity of the pectin chosen—amidated low methoxyl pectins are generally thermoreversible, meaning they can form gels that can melt and reform, whereas non-amidated low methoxyl pectins can form thermostable gels that withstand high temperatures; these properties make low methoxyl pectins suitable for low sugar and sugar-free applications, dairy products, and stabilizing acidic protein drinks.

For conventional jams and marmalades that contain above 60% sugar and soluble fruit solids, high-ester (high methoxyl) pectins are used. With low-ester (low methoxyl) pectins and amidated pectins, less sugar is needed, so that diet products can be made. Water extract of aiyu seeds is traditionally used in Taiwan to make aiyu jelly, where the extract gels without heating due to low-ester pectins from the seeds and the bivalent cations from the water.

Pectin is used in confectionery jellies to give a good gel structure, a clean bite and to confer a good flavour release. Pectin can also be used to stabilise acidic protein drinks, such as drinking yogurt, to improve the mouth-feel and the pulp stability in juice based drinks and as a fat substitute in baked goods.

Typical levels of pectin used as a food additive are between 0.5 and 1.0% – this is about the same amount of pectin as in fresh fruit.

In medicine, pectin increases viscosity and volume of stool so that it is used against constipation and diarrhea. It was one of the main ingredients used in Kaopectate – a medication to combat diarrhea – along with kaolinite. It has been used in gentle heavy metal removal from biological systems. Pectin is also used in throat lozenges as a demulcent.

In cosmetic products, pectin acts as a stabiliser. Pectin is also used in wound healing preparations and speciality medical adhesives, such as colostomy devices.

Sriamornsak revealed that pectin could be used in various oral drug delivery platforms, e.g., controlled release systems, gastro-retentive systems, colon-specific delivery systems and mucoadhesive delivery systems, according to its intoxicity and low cost. It was found that pectin from different sources provides different gelling abilities, due to variations in molecular size and chemical composition. Like other natural polymers, a major problem with pectin is inconsistency in reproducibility between samples, which may result in poor reproducibility in drug delivery characteristics.

In ruminant nutrition, depending on the extent of lignification of the cell wall, pectin is up to 90% digestible by bacterial enzymes. Ruminant nutritionists recommend that the digestibility and energy concentration in forages be improved by increasing pectin concentration in the forage.

In cigars, pectin is considered an excellent substitute for vegetable glue and many cigar smokers and collectors use pectin for repairing damaged tobacco leaves on their cigars.

Yablokov et al., writing in Chernobyl: Consequences of the Catastrophe for People and the Environment, quote research conducted by the Ukrainian Center of Radiation Medicine and the Belarusian Institute of Radiation Medicine and Endocrinology, concluded, regarding pectin's radioprotective effects, that "adding pectin preparations to the food of inhabitants of the Chernobyl-contaminated regions promotes an effective excretion of incorporated radionuclides" such as cesium-137. The authors reported on the positive results of using pectin food additive preparations in a number of clinical studies conducted on children in severely polluted areas, with up to 50% improvement over control groups. During the Second World War, Allied pilots were provided with maps printed on silk, for navigation in escape and evasion efforts. The printing process at first proved nearly impossible because the several layers of ink immediately ran, blurring outlines and rendering place names illegible until the inventor of the maps, Clayton Hutton, mixed a little pectin with the ink and at once the pectin coagulated the ink and prevented it from running, allowing small topographic features to be clearly visible.

== Legal status ==
At the Joint FAO/WHO Expert Committee Report on Food Additives and in the European Union, no numerical acceptable daily intake (ADI) has been set, as pectin is considered safe.

The European Union (EU) has not set a daily intake limit for two types of pectin, known as E440(i) and Amidated Pectin E440(ii). The EU has established purity standards for these additives in the EU Commission Regulation (EU)/231/2012. Pectin can be used as needed in most food categories, a concept referred to as "quantum satis". The European Food Safety Authority (EFSA) conducted a re-evaluation of Pectin E440(i) and Amidated Pectin E440(ii) in 2017. The EFSA concluded that the use of these food additives poses no safety concern for the general population. Furthermore, the agency stated that it is not necessary to establish a numerical value for the Acceptable Daily Intake (ADI).

In the United States, pectin is generally recognised as safe for human consumption.

In the International Numbering System (INS), pectin has the number 440. In Europe, pectins are differentiated into the E numbers E440(i) for non-amidated pectins and E440(ii) for amidated pectins. There are specifications in all national and international legislation defining its quality and regulating its use.

== History ==
Pectin was first isolated and described in 1825 by Henri Braconnot, though the action of pectin to make jams and marmalades was known long before. To obtain well-set jams from fruits that had little or only poor quality pectin, pectin-rich fruits or their extracts were mixed into the recipe.

During the Industrial Revolution, the makers of fruit preserves turned to producers of apple juice to obtain dried apple pomace that was cooked to extract pectin. Later, in the 1920s and 1930s, factories were built that commercially extracted pectin from dried apple pomace, and later citrus peel, in regions that produced apple juice in both the US and Europe.

Pectin was first sold as a liquid extract, but is now most often used as dried powder, which is easier than a liquid to store and handle.

== See also ==
- Fruit snacks
