= History of aspirin =

Aspirin (acetylsalicylic acid), an organic compound that does not occur in nature, was first synthesised in 1899.

In 1897, scientists at the drug and dye firm Bayer began investigating acetylated organic compounds as possible new medicines, following the success of acetanilide ten years earlier. Two years later, Bayer created acetylsalicylic acid, which they marketed around the world under the brand name "Aspirin". The drug was sold widely in the first half of the twentieth century, both by Bayer and by competing drug manufacturers. The name "aspirin" was so widely used that Bayer lost (or sold) the rights to the trademark in many countries.

Aspirin's popularity declined after the development of acetaminophen/paracetamol in 1956 and ibuprofen in 1962. In the 1960s and 1970s, John Vane and others discovered the basic mechanism of aspirin's effects, while clinical trials and other studies from the 1960s to the 1980s established aspirin's efficacy as an anti-clotting agent that reduces the risk of clotting diseases. Aspirin sales revived considerably in the last decades of the twentieth century, and remain strong in the twenty-first with widespread use as a preventive treatment for heart attacks and strokes.

== History of willow in medicine ==
Numerous authors have claimed that willow was used by the ancients as a painkiller, but there is no evidence that this is true. All such accounts date from after the discovery of aspirin, and are possibly based on a misunderstanding of the chemistry. Bartram's 1998 Encyclopedia of Herbal Medicine states, 'in 1838 chemists identified salicylic acid in the bark of White Willow. After many years, it was synthesised as acetylsalicylic acid, now known as aspirin.' It goes on to claim that willow extract has the same medical properties as aspirin, which is incorrect.

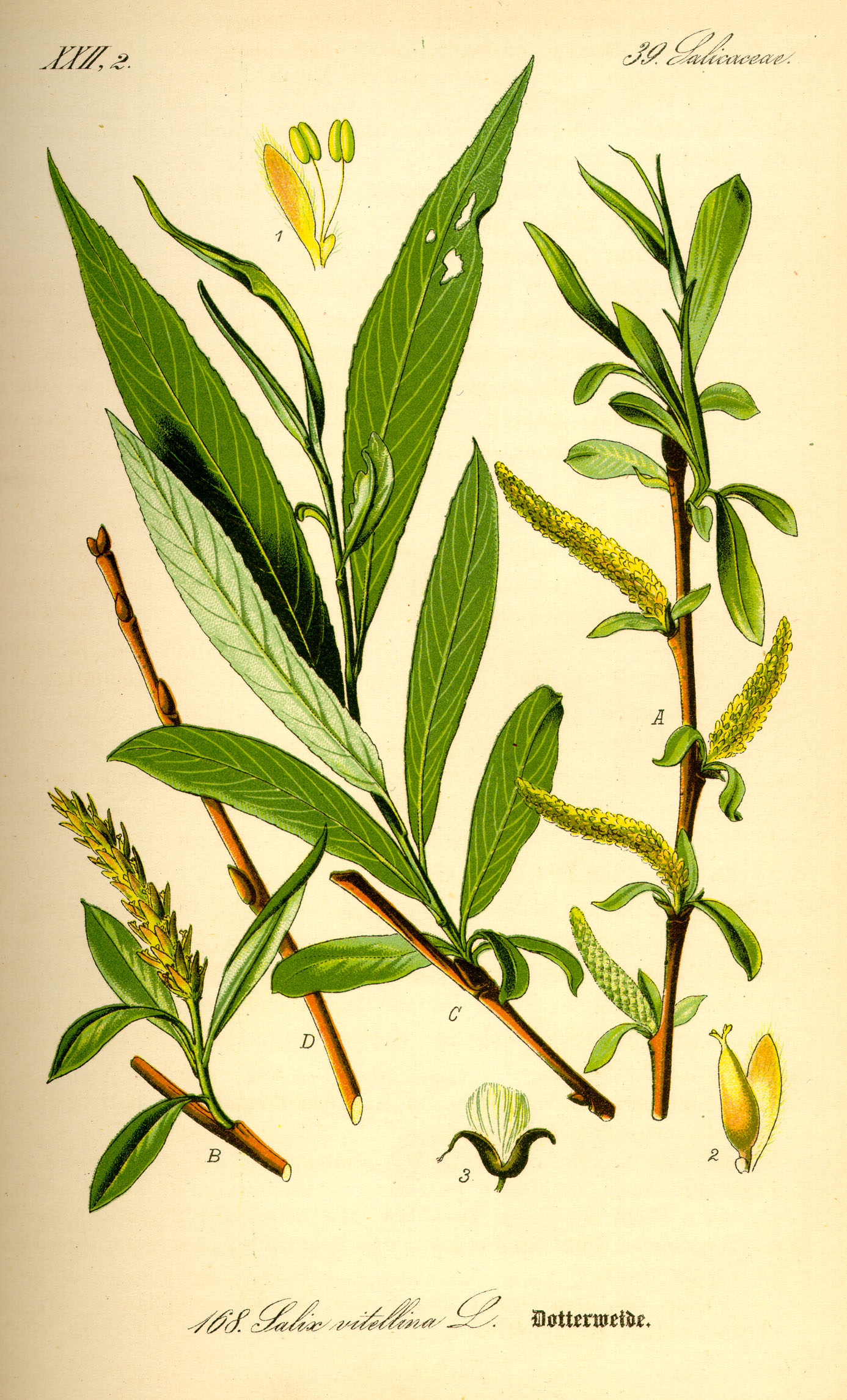
Edward Stone believed that the bark of the white willow (Salix alba) could substitute for Peruvian bark in the treatment of ague.

Ancient medical uses for willow were more varied. The Roman author Aulus Cornelius Celsus recommended using the leaves, pounded and boiled in vinegar, as treatment for uterine prolapse, but it is unclear what he considered the therapeutic action to be; it is unlikely to have been pain relief, as he recommended cauterization in the following paragraph (De Medicina, book VI, p. 287, chapter 18, section 10). Gerard quotes Dioscorides, 'that [the bark] being burnt to ashes, and steeped in vinegar, takes away corns and other like risings in the feet and toes,' which is similar to modern uses of salicylic acid. Translations of Hippocrates make no mention of willow at all.

Nicholas Culpeper, in The Complete Herbal, gave many uses for willow, including to staunch wounds, to 'stay the heat of lust' in man or woman, and to provoke urine ('if stopped') but, like Celsus, made no mention of any analgesic properties. He also used the burnt ashes of willow bark, mixed with vinegar, to 'take away warts, corns, and superfluous flesh.'

Although Turner (1551) thought that fevers could be cured by 'cooling the air' with boughs and leaves of willow, the earliest known mention of willow bark extract for treating fever came in 1763, when a letter from English chaplain Edward Stone to the Royal Society described the dramatic power of powdered white willow bark to cure intermittent fevers, or 'ague'. Stone had 'accidentally' tasted the bark of a willow tree in 1758 and noticed an astringency reminiscent of Peruvian bark, which he knew was used to treat malaria. Over the next five years he treated some 50 ague sufferers, with universal success, except in a few severe cases, where it merely reduced their symptoms. Stone's remedy was trialled by a few pharmacists, but was never widely adopted. During the American Civil War, Confederate forces experimented with willow as a cure for malaria, without success.

== Synthesis of acetylsalicylic acid ==
In the 19th century, as the young discipline of organic chemistry began to grow in Europe, scientists attempted to isolate and purify alkaloids and other novel organic chemicals. After unsuccessful attempts by Italian chemists Brugnatelli and Fontana in 1826, Johann Buchner obtained relatively pure salicin crystals from willow bark in 1828; the following year, Pierre-Joseph Leroux developed another procedure for extracting modest yields of salicin. In 1834, Swiss pharmacist Johann Pagenstecher extracted a substance from meadowsweet which, he suggested, might reveal an "excellent therapeutic aspect", although he was uninterested in increasing the number of chemicals available to pharmaceutical science. By 1838, Italian chemist Raffaele Piria found a method of obtaining a more potent acid form of willow extract, which he named salicylic acid. The German chemist who had been working to identify the Spiraea extract, Karl Jacob Löwig, soon realized that it was in fact the same salicylic acid that Piria had found.

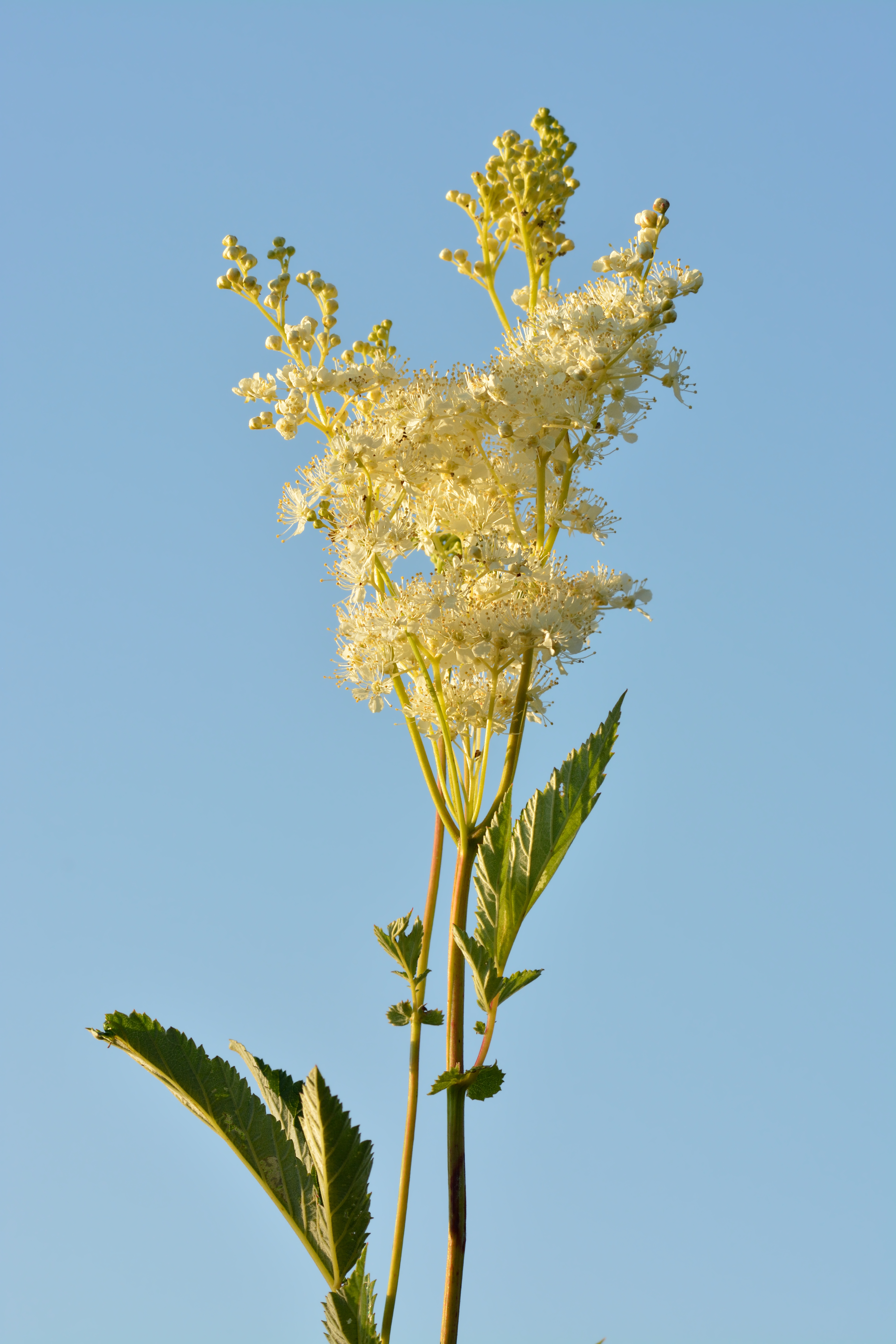
Meadowsweet (Filipendula ulmaria).

The first evidence that salicylates might have medical uses came in 1876, when the Scottish physician Thomas MacLagan experimented with salicin as a treatment for acute rheumatism, with considerable success, as he reported in The Lancet. Meanwhile, German scientists tried salicylic acid in the form of sodium salicylate with less success and more severe side effects. The treatment of rheumatic fever with salicin gradually gained some acceptance in medical circles.

By the 1880s, the German chemical industry, jump-started by the lucrative development of dyes from coal tar, was branching out to investigate the potential of new tar-derived medicines. The turning point was the advent of Kalle & Company's Antifebrine, the branded version of acetanilide —the fever-reducing properties of which were discovered by accident in 1886. Antifebrine's success inspired Carl Duisberg, the head of research at the small dye firm Friedrich Bayer & Company, to start a systematic search for other useful drugs by acetylation of various alkaloids and aromatic compounds. Bayer chemists soon developed Phenacetin, followed by the sedatives Sulfonal and Trional.

Upon taking control of Bayer's overall management in 1890, Duisberg began to expand the company's drug research program. He created a pharmaceutical group for creating new drugs, headed by former university chemist Arthur Eichengrün, and a pharmacology group for testing the drugs, headed by Heinrich Dreser (beginning in 1897, after periods under Wilhelm Siebel and Hermann Hildebrandt). In 1894, the young chemist Felix Hoffmann joined the pharmaceutical group. Dreser, Eichengrün and Hoffmann would be the key figures in the development of acetylsalicylic acid as the drug Aspirin (though their respective roles have been the subject of some contention).

In 1897, Hoffmann used salicylic acid refluxed with acetic anhydride to synthesise acetylsalicylic acid. Eichengrün sent the ASA to Dreser's pharmacology group for testing, and the initial results were very positive. The next step would normally have been clinical trials, but Dreser opposed further investigation of ASA because of salicylic acid's reputation for weakening the heart—possibly a side effect of the high doses often used to treat rheumatism. Dreser's group was soon busy testing Felix Hoffmann's next chemical success: diacetylmorphine (which the Bayer team soon branded as heroin because of the heroic feeling it gave them). Eichengrün, frustrated by Dreser's rejection of ASA, went directly to Bayer's Berlin representative Felix Goldmann to arrange low-profile trials with doctors. Though the results of those trials were also very positive, with no reports of the typical salicylic acid complications, Dreser still demurred. However, Carl Duisberg intervened and scheduled full testing. Soon, Dreser admitted ASA's potential and Bayer decided to proceed with production. Dreser wrote a report of the findings to publicize the new drug; in it, he omitted any mention of Hoffmann or Eichengrün. He would also be the only one of the three to receive royalties for the drug (for testing it), since it was ineligible for any patent the chemists might have taken out for creating it. For many years, however, he attributed Aspirin's discovery solely to Hoffmann.

The controversy over who was primarily responsible for aspirin's development spread through much of the twentieth century and into the twenty-first. As of 2016 Bayer still described Hoffmann as having "discovered a pain-relieving, fever-lowering and anti-inflammatory substance." Historians and others have also challenged Bayer's early accounts of Bayer's synthesis, in which Hoffmann was primarily responsible for the Bayer breakthrough. In 1949, shortly before his death, Eichengrün wrote an article, "Fifty Years of Aspirin", claiming that he had not told Hoffmann the purpose of his research, meaning that Hoffmann merely carried out Eichengrün's research plan, and that the drug would never have gone to the market without his direction. This claim was later supported by research conducted by historian Walter Sneader. Axel Helmstaedter, General Secretary of the International Society for the History of Pharmacy, subsequently questioned the novelty of Sneader's research, noting that several earlier articles discussed the Hoffmann–Eichengrün controversy in detail. Bayer countered Sneader in a press release stating that according to the records, Hoffmann and Eichengrün held equal positions, and Eichengrün was not Hoffmann's supervisor. Hoffmann was named on the US Patent as the inventor, which Sneader did not mention. Eichengrün, who left Bayer in 1908, had multiple opportunities to claim the priority and had never before 1949 done it; he neither claimed nor received any percentage of the profit from aspirin sales.

=== Naming the drug ===
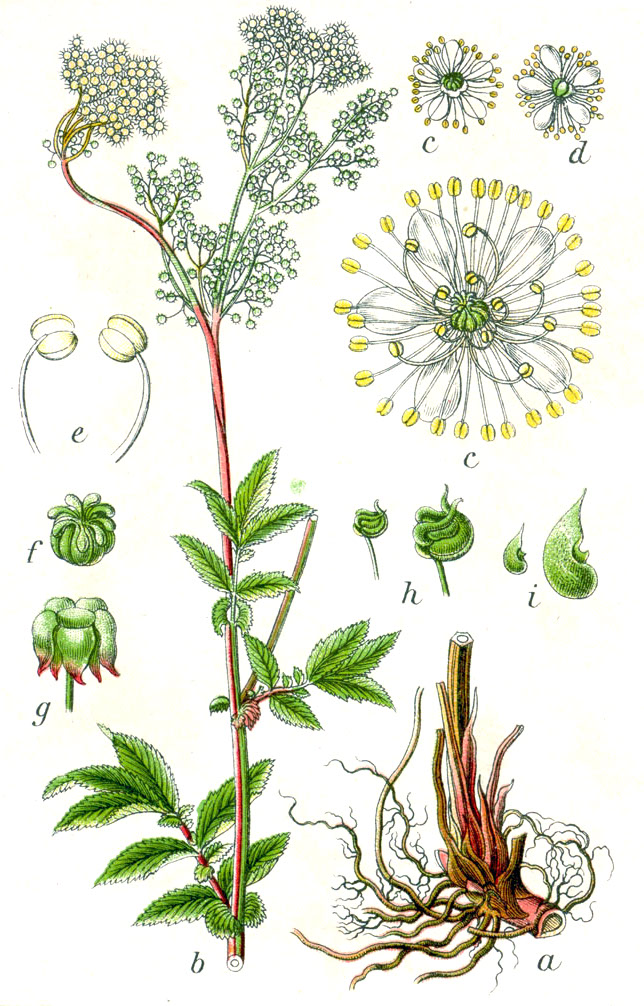
Spirea ulmaria (now known as Filipendula ulmaria), or meadowsweet, is the German namesake of Spirsäure (salicylic acid), and ultimately aspirin.

The name Aspirin was derived from the name of the chemical ASA—Acetylspirsäure in German. Spirsäure (salicylic acid) was named for the meadowsweet plant, Spirea ulmaria, from which it could be derived. Aspirin took a- for the acetylation, -spir- from Spirsäure, and added -in as a typical drug name ending to make it easy to say. In the final round of naming proposals that circulated through Bayer, it came down to Aspirin and Euspirin; Aspirin, they feared, might remind customers of aspiration, but Arthur Eichengrün argued that Eu- (meaning "good") was inappropriate because it usually indicated an improvement over an earlier version of a similar drug. Since the substance itself was already known, Bayer intended to use the new name to establish their drug as something new; in January 1899 they settled on Aspirin.

=== Rights and sale ===
Under Carl Duisberg's leadership, Bayer was firmly committed to the standards of ethical drugs, as opposed to patent medicines. Ethical drugs were drugs that could be obtained only through a pharmacist, usually with a doctor's prescription. Advertising drugs directly to consumers was considered unethical and strongly opposed by many medical organizations; that was the domain of patent medicines. Therefore, Bayer was limited to marketing Aspirin directly to doctors.

When production of Aspirin began in 1899, Bayer sent out small packets of the drug to doctors, pharmacists and hospitals, advising them of Aspirin's uses and encouraging them to publish about the drug's effects and effectiveness. As positive results came in and enthusiasm grew, Bayer sought to secure patent and trademark wherever possible. It was ineligible for patent in Germany (despite being accepted briefly before the decision was overturned), but Aspirin was patented in Britain (filed 22 December 1898) and the United States (US Patent 644,077 issued 27 February 1900). The British patent was overturned in 1905, the American patent was also besieged but was ultimately upheld.

Faced with growing legal and illegal competition for the globally marketed ASA, Bayer worked to cement the connection between Bayer and Aspirin. One strategy it developed was to switch from distributing Aspirin powder for pharmacists to press into pill form to distributing standardized tablets—complete with the distinctive Bayer cross logo. In 1903 the company set up an American subsidiary, with a converted factory in Rensselaer, New York, to produce Aspirin for the American market without paying import duties. Bayer also sued the most egregious patent violators and smugglers. The company's attempts to hold onto its Aspirin sales incited criticism from muckraking journalists and the American Medical Association, especially after the 1906 Pure Food and Drug Act that prevented trademarked drugs from being listed in the United States Pharmacopeia; Bayer listed ASA with an intentionally convoluted generic name (monoacetic acid ester of salicylic acid) to discourage doctors referring to anything but Aspirin.

== World War I and Bayer ==
By the outbreak of World War I in 1914, Bayer was facing competition in all its major markets from local ASA producers as well as other German drug firms (particularly Heyden and Hoechst). The British market was immediately closed to the German companies, but British manufacturing could not meet the demand—especially with phenol supplies, necessary for ASA synthesis, largely being used for explosives manufacture. On 5 February 1915, Bayer's UK trademarks were voided, so that any company could use the term aspirin. The Australian market was taken over by Aspro, after the makers of Nicholas-Aspirin lost a short-lived exclusive right to the aspirin name there. In the United States, Bayer was still under German control—though the war disrupted the links between the American Bayer plant and the German Bayer headquarters—but phenol shortage threatened to reduce aspirin production to a trickle, and imports across the Atlantic Ocean were blocked by the Royal Navy.

=== Great Phenol Plot ===
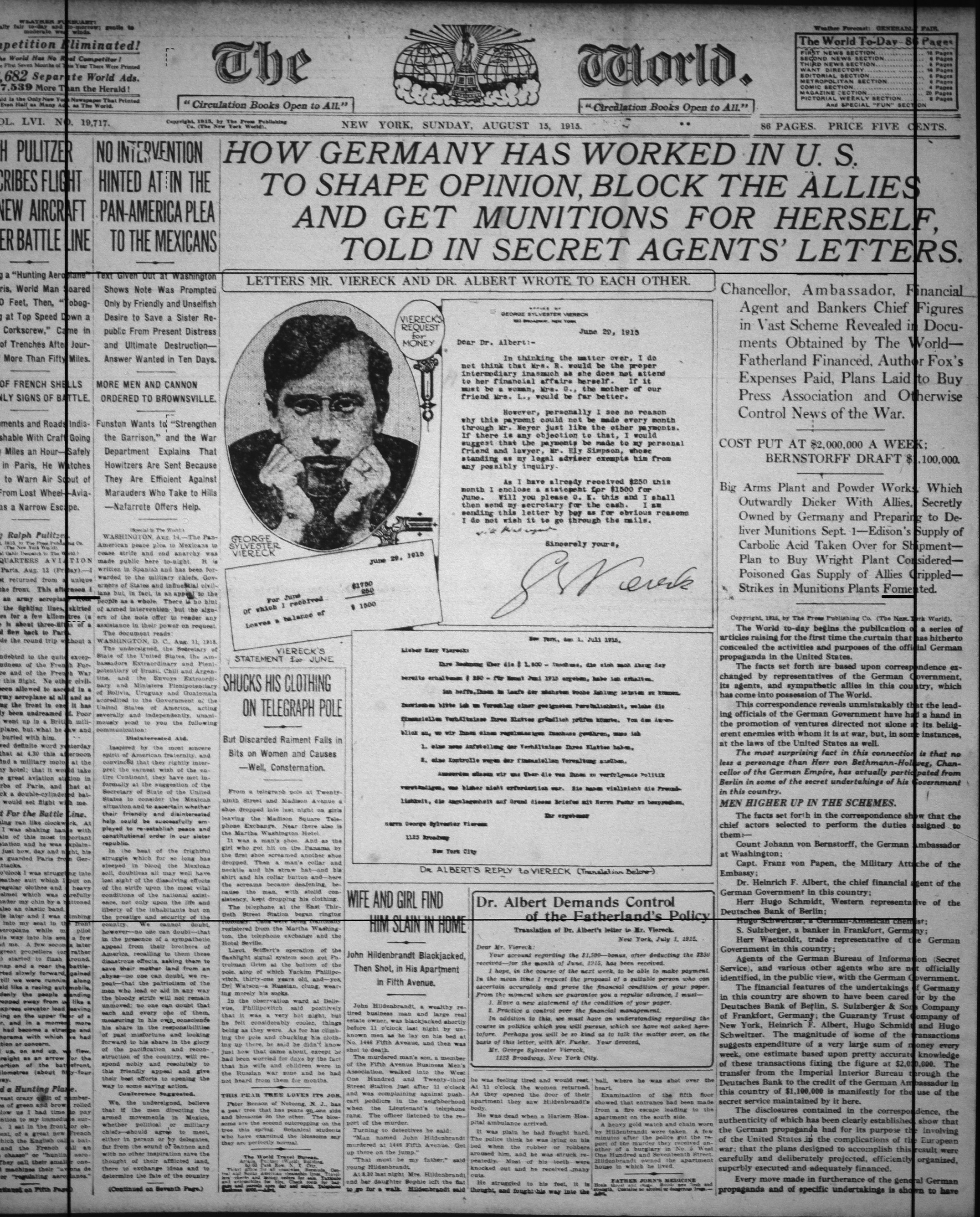
The edition of 15 August 1915 of the New York World broke the news of the Great Phenol Plot and other clandestine pro-German activities that were organized by Johann Heinrich von Bernstorff and Heinrich Alberts.

To secure phenol for aspirin production, and at the same time indirectly aid the German war effort, German agents in the United States orchestrated what became known as the Great Phenol Plot. By 1915, the price of phenol rose to the point that Bayer's aspirin plant was forced to drastically cut production. This was especially problematic because Bayer was instituting a new branding strategy in preparation of the expiry of the aspirin patent in the United States. Thomas Edison, who needed phenol to manufacture phonograph records, was also facing supply problems; in response, he created a phenol factory capable of pumping out twelve tons per day. Edison's excess phenol seemed destined for trinitrophenol production.

Although the United States remained officially neutral until April 1917, it was increasingly throwing its support to the Allies through trade. To counter this, German ambassador Johann Heinrich von Bernstorff and Interior Ministry official Heinrich Albert were tasked with undermining American industry and maintaining public support for Germany. One of their agents was a former Bayer employee, Hugo Schweitzer. Schweitzer set up a contract for a front company called the Chemical Exchange Association to buy all of Edison's excess phenol. Much of the phenol would go to the German-owned Chemische Fabrik von Heyden's American subsidiary; Heyden was the supplier of Bayer's salicylic acid for aspirin manufacture. By July 1915, Edison's plants were selling about three tons of phenol per day to Schweitzer; Heyden's salicylic acid production was soon back on line, and in turn Bayer's aspirin plant was running as well.

The plot only lasted a few months. On 24 July 1915, Heinrich Albert's briefcase, containing details about the phenol plot, was recovered by a Secret Service agent. Although the activities were not illegal—since the United States was still officially neutral and still trading with Germany—the documents were soon leaked to the New York World, an anti-German newspaper. The World published an exposé on 15 August 1915. The public pressure soon forced Schweitzer and Edison to end the phenol deal—with the embarrassed Edison subsequently sending his excess phenol to the U.S. military—but by that time the deal had netted the plotters over two million dollars and there was already enough phenol to keep Bayer's Aspirin plant running. Bayer's reputation took a large hit, however, just as the company was preparing to launch an advertising campaign to secure the connection between aspirin and the Bayer brand.

=== Bayer loses foreign holdings ===
Beginning in 1915, Bayer set up a number of shell corporations and subsidiaries in the United States, to hedge against the possibility of losing control of its American assets if the U.S. should enter the war and to allow Bayer to enter other markets (e.g., army uniforms). After the U.S. declared war on Germany in April 1917, alien property custodian A. Mitchell Palmer began investigating German-owned businesses, and soon turned his attention to Bayer. To avoid having to surrender all profits and assets to the government, Bayer's management shifted the stock to a new company, nominally owned by Americans but controlled by the German-American Bayer leaders. Palmer, however, soon uncovered this scheme and seized all of Bayer's American holdings. After the Trading with the Enemy Act was amended to allow sale of these holdings, the government auctioned off the Rensselaer plant and all Bayer's American patents and trademarks, including even the Bayer brand name and the Bayer cross logo. It was bought by a patent medicine company, Sterling Products, Inc. The rights to Bayer Aspirin and the U.S. rights to the Bayer name and trademarks were sold back to Bayer AG in 1994 for US$1 billion.

== Interwar years ==
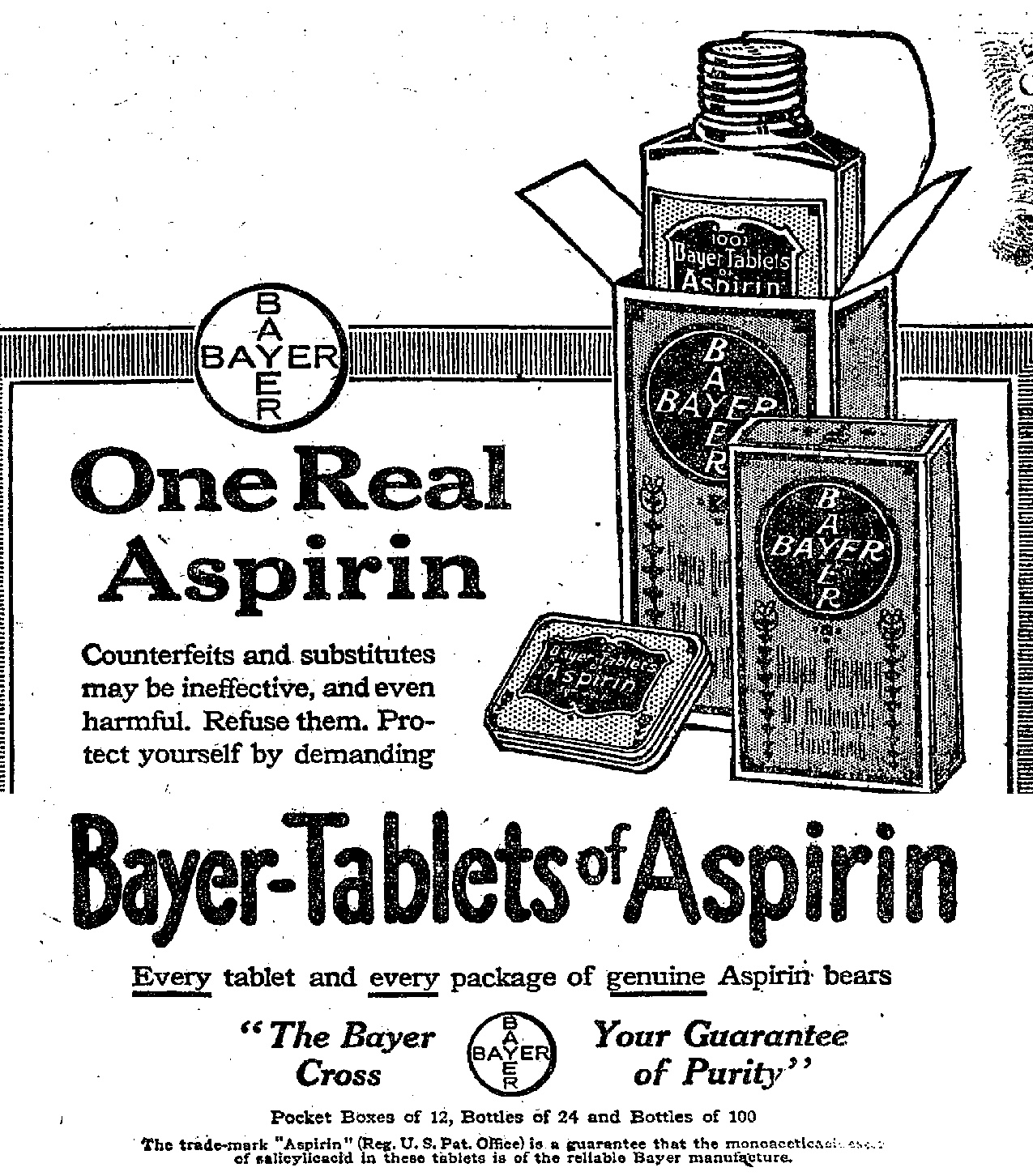
Bayer began advertising directly to American consumers just before the expiration of the aspirin patent. This ad, from The New York Times, 19 February 1917, emphasizes Bayer as the "One Real Aspirin" in anticipation of legal competition in the American market.

With the coming of the deadly Spanish flu pandemic in 1918, aspirin—by whatever name—secured a reputation as one of the most powerful and effective drugs in the pharmacopeia of the time. Its fever-reducing properties gave many sick patients enough strength to fight through the infection, and aspirin companies large and small earned the loyalty of doctors and the public—when they could manufacture or purchase enough aspirin to meet demand. Despite this, some people believed that Germans put the Spanish flu bug in Bayer aspirin, causing the pandemic as a war tactic.

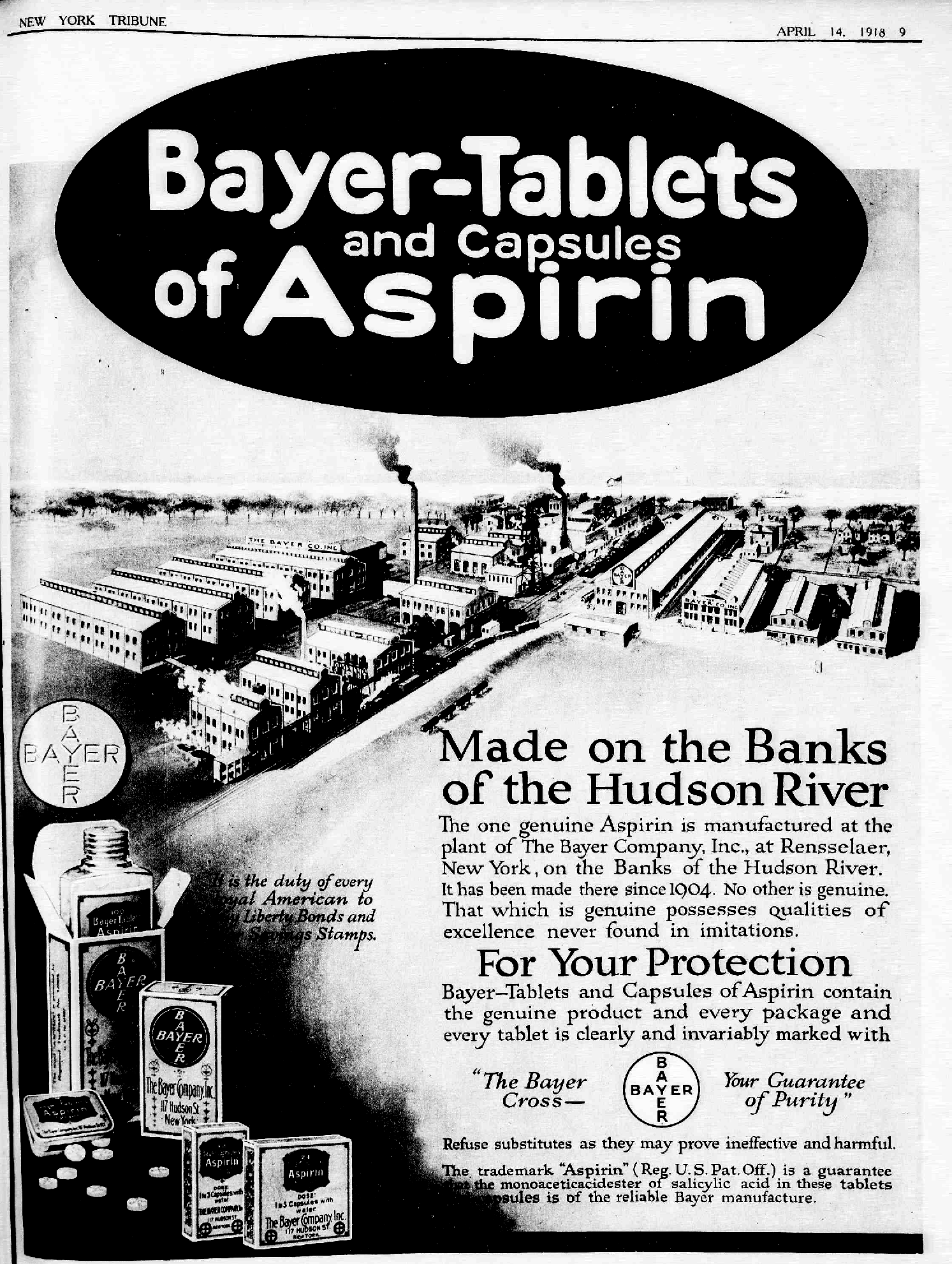
Newspaper ad for Bayer Aspirin from April 1918. The aspirin patent had expired, Bayer still had control over the Aspirin trademark, seen at the bottom of the ad, and a "patriotic" slogan to buy war bonds. Also shows the factory in New York State.

The U.S. ASA patent expired in 1917, but Sterling owned the aspirin trademark, which was the only commonly used term for the drug. In 1920, United Drug Company challenged the Aspirin trademark, which became officially generic for public sale in the U.S. (although it remained trademarked when sold to wholesalers and pharmacists). With demand growing rapidly in the wake of the Spanish flu, there were soon hundreds of "aspirin" brands on sale in the United States.

Sterling Products, equipped with all of Bayer's U.S. intellectual property, tried to take advantage of its new brand as quickly as possible, before generic ASAs took over. However, without German expertise to run the Rensselaer plant to make aspirin and the other Bayer pharmaceuticals, they had only a finite aspirin supply and were facing competition from other companies. Sterling president William E. Weiss had ambitions to sell Bayer aspirin not only in the U.S., but to compete with the German Bayer abroad as well. Taking advantage of the losses Farbenfabriken Bayer (the German Bayer company) suffered through the reparation provisions of the Treaty of Versailles, Weiss worked out a deal with Carl Duisberg to share profits in the Americas, Australia, South Africa and Great Britain for most Bayer drugs, in return for technical assistance in manufacturing the drugs.

Sterling also took over Bayer's Canadian assets as well as ownership of the Aspirin trademark which is still valid in Canada and most of the world. Bayer bought Sterling Winthrop in 1994 restoring ownership of the Bayer name and Bayer cross trademark in the US and Canada as well as ownership of the Aspirin trademark in Canada.

=== Diversification of market ===
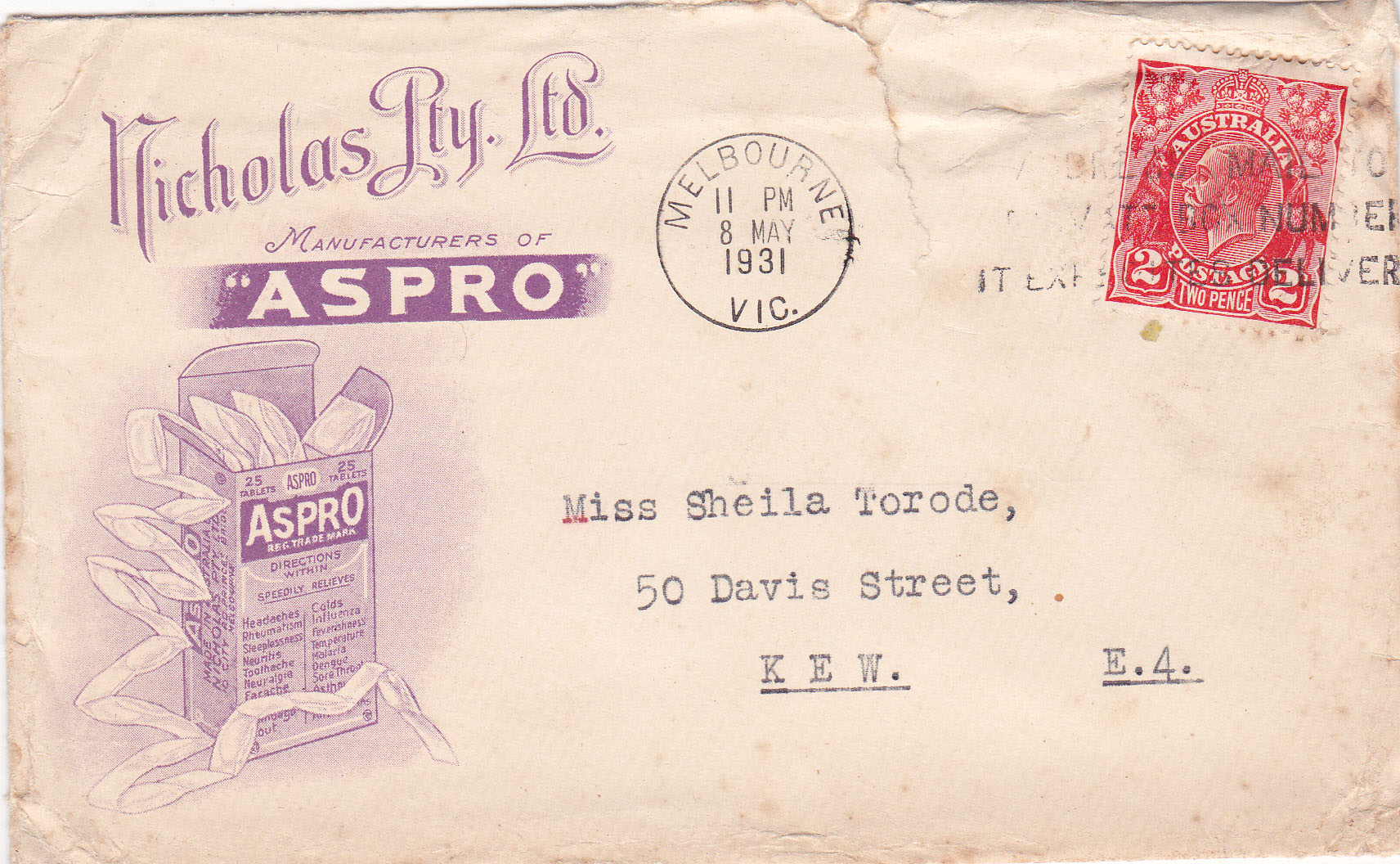
Aspro packaging 1931

Between World War I and World War II, many new aspirin brands and aspirin-based products entered the market. The Australian company Nicholas Proprietary Limited, through the aggressive marketing strategies of George Davies, built Aspro into a global brand, with particular strength in Australia, New Zealand, and the U.K. American brands such as Burton's Aspirin, Molloy's Aspirin, Cal-Aspirin and St. Joseph Aspirin tried to compete with the American Bayer, while new products such Cafaspirin (aspirin with caffeine) and Alka-Seltzer (a soluble mix of aspirin and bicarbonate of soda) put aspirin to new uses. In 1925, the German Bayer became part of IG Farben, a conglomerate of former dye companies; IG Farben's brands of Aspirin and, in Latin America, the caffeinated Cafiaspirina (co-managed with Sterling Products) competed with less expensive aspirins such as Geniol.

== Competition from new drugs ==
After World War II, with the IG Farben conglomerate dismantled because of its central role in the Nazi regime, Sterling Products bought half of Bayer Ltd, the British Bayer subsidiary—the other half of which it already owned. However, Bayer Aspirin made up only a small fraction of the British aspirin market because of competition from Aspro, Disprin (a soluble aspirin drug) and other brands. Bayer Ltd began searching for new pain relievers to compete more effectively. After several moderately successful compound drugs that mainly utilized aspirin (Anadin and Excedrin), Bayer Ltd's manager Laurie Spalton ordered an investigation of a substance that scientists at Yale had, in 1946, found to be the metabolically active derivative of acetanilide: acetaminophen. After clinical trials, Bayer Ltd brought acetaminophen to market as Panadol in 1956.

However, Sterling Products did not market Panadol in the United States or other countries where Bayer Aspirin still dominated the aspirin market. Other firms began selling acetaminophen drugs, most significantly, McNeil Laboratories with liquid Tylenol in 1955, and Tylenol pills in 1958. By 1967, Tylenol was available without a prescription. Because it did not cause gastric irritation, acetaminophen rapidly displaced much of aspirin's sales. Another analgesic, anti-inflammatory drug was introduced in 1962: ibuprofen (sold as Brufen in the U.K. and Motrin in the U.S.). By the 1970s, aspirin had a relatively small portion of the pain reliever market, and in the 1980s sales decreased even more when ibuprofen became available without prescription.

Also in the early 1980s, several studies suggested a link between children's consumption of aspirin and Reye's syndrome, a potentially fatal disease. By 1986, the U.S. Food and Drug Administration required warning labels on all aspirin, further suppressing sales. The makers of Tylenol also filed a lawsuit against Anacin aspirin maker American Home Products, claiming that the failure to add warning labels before 1986 had unfairly held back Tylenol sales, though this suit was eventually dismissed.

== Investigating how aspirin works ==
The mechanism of aspirin's analgesic, anti-inflammatory and antipyretic properties was unknown through the drug's heyday in the early- to mid-twentieth century; Heinrich Dreser's explanation, widely accepted since the drug was first brought to market, was that aspirin relieved pain by acting on the central nervous system. In 1958 Harry Collier, a biochemist in the London laboratory of pharmaceutical company Parke-Davis, began investigating the relationship between kinins and the effects of aspirin. In tests on guinea pigs, Collier found that aspirin, if given beforehand, inhibited the bronchoconstriction effects of bradykinin. He found that cutting the guinea pigs' vagus nerve did not affect the action of bradykinin or the inhibitory effect of aspirin—evidence that aspirin worked locally to combat pain and inflammation, rather than on the central nervous system. In 1963, Collier began working with University of London pharmacology graduate student Priscilla Piper to determine the precise mechanism of aspirin's effects. However, it was difficult to pin down the precise biochemical goings-on in live research animals, and in vitro tests on removed animal tissues did not behave like in vivo tests.

After five years of collaboration, Collier arranged for Piper to work with pharmacologist John Vane at the Royal College of Surgeons of England, in order to learn Vane's new bioassay methods, which seemed like a possible solution to the in vitro testing failures. Vane and Piper tested the biochemical cascade associated with anaphylactic shock (in extracts from guinea pig lungs, applied to tissue from rabbit aortas). They found that aspirin inhibited the release of an unidentified chemical generated by guinea pig lungs, a chemical that caused rabbit tissue to contract. By 1971, Vane identified the chemical (which they called "rabbit-aorta contracting substance," or RCS) as a prostaglandin. In a 23 June 1971 paper in the journal Nature, Vane and Piper suggested that aspirin and similar drugs (the nonsteroidal anti-inflammatory drugs or NSAIDs) worked by blocking the production of prostaglandins. Later research showed that NSAIDs such as aspirin worked by inhibiting cyclooxygenase, the enzyme responsible for converting arachidonic acid into a prostaglandin.

== Revival as heart drug ==
Aspirin's effects on blood clotting (as an antiplatelet agent) were first noticed in 1950 by Lawrence Craven. Craven, a family doctor in California, had been directing tonsillectomy patients to chew Aspergum, an aspirin-laced chewing gum. He found that an unusual number of patients had to be hospitalized for severe bleeding, and that those patients had been using very high amounts of Aspergum. Craven began recommending daily aspirin to all his patients, and claimed that the patients who followed the aspirin regimen (about 8,000 people) had no signs of thrombosis. However, Craven's studies were not taken seriously by the medical community, because he had not done a placebo-controlled study and had published only in obscure journals.

The idea of using aspirin to prevent clotting diseases (such as heart attacks and strokes) was revived in the 1960s, when medical researcher Harvey Weiss found that aspirin had an anti-adhesive effect on blood platelets (and unlike other potential antiplatelet drugs, aspirin had low toxicity). Medical Research Council haematologist John O'Brien picked up on Weiss's finding and, in 1963, began working with epidemiologist Peter Elwood on aspirin's anti-thrombosis drug potential. Elwood began a large-scale trial of aspirin as a preventive drug for heart attacks. Nicholas Laboratories agreed to provide aspirin tablets, and Elwood enlisted heart attack survivors in a double-blind controlled study—heart attack survivors were statistically more likely to suffer a second attack, greatly reducing the number of patients necessary to reliably detect whether aspirin had an effect on heart attacks. The study began in February 1971, though the researchers soon had to break the double-blinding when a study by American epidemiologist Hershel Jick suggested that aspirin prevented heart attacks but suggested that the heart attacks were more deadly. Jick had found that fewer aspirin-takers were admitted to his hospital for heart attacks than non-aspirin-takers, and one possible explanation was that aspirin caused heart attack sufferers to die before reaching the hospital; Elwood's initial results ruled out that explanation. When the Elwood trial ended in 1973, it showed a modest but not statistically significant reduction in heart attacks among the group taking aspirin.

Several subsequent studies put aspirin's effectiveness as a heart drug on firmer ground, but the evidence was not incontrovertible. However, in the mid-1980s, with the relatively new technique of meta-analysis, statistician Richard Peto convinced the U.S. FDA and much of the medical community that the aspirin studies, in aggregate, showed aspirin's effectiveness with relative certainty. By the end of the 1980s, aspirin was widely used as a preventive drug for heart attacks and had regained its former position as the top-selling analgesic in the U.S.

In 2018, three major clinical trials cast doubt on that conventional wisdom, finding few benefits and consistent bleeding risks associated with daily aspirin use. Taken together, the findings led the American Heart Association and American College of Cardiology to change clinical practice guidelines in early 2019, recommending against the routine use of aspirin in people older than 70 years or people with increased bleeding risk who do not have existing cardiovascular disease.
