= Edward Stone (natural philosopher) =

English Anglican priest who discovered the active ingredient of aspirin

Edward Stone (1702–1768) was a Church of England cleric who discovered the active ingredient of aspirin.

== Life ==
Edward Stone was born in Princes Risborough, Buckinghamshire, England, in 1702. His parents were Edward Stone, a gentleman farmer, and his first wife Elizabeth Reynolds. His mother having died, his father took a second wife, Elizabeth Grubb, in 1707; the Grubb family was to play a major role in Stone's life.

Stone went to Wadham College, Oxford, in 1720, where in 1730 he became a Fellow. In 1728 or 1729 he was ordained deacon and priest, and served as curate at Charlton-on-Otmoor.

From 1738 Stone held a living at Horsenden, Buckinghamshire, to which he was presented by John Grubb, brother to his stepmother. He married Elizabeth Grubb(e) at Mercers' Hall Chapel, Cheapside (a non-parochial church), London, on 7 July 1741: she was John Grubb's daughter. As was required at that period, Stone resigned as Fellow of Wadham on marrying.

In 1745, Stone became chaplain to Sir Jonathan Cope, 1st Baronet at Bruern Abbey and served various curacies around Chipping Norton, Oxfordshire. Cope had presented him to the living of Drayton, near Banbury, Oxfordshire, which he held from 1742. He entered politics at the general election of 1754, as a Whig agent, liked but being found "slow" by Lady Susan Keck. He was rewarded in 1755 with a post, a Justice of the Peace (JP) for Oxfordshire, where he was active in administering the Poor Law.

Stone at one time lived on the site of the Hitchman Brewery in West Street, Chipping Norton, where a blue plaque has now been erected. He was buried in Horsenden in 1768.

== Works ==
=== Aspirin ===
Walking one day through a meadow near Chipping Norton, while suffering from "agues", Stone was prompted to detach and nibble at a small piece of bark from a willow tree and was struck by its extremely bitter taste. Knowing that the bark of the Peruvian cinchona tree − from which quinine (used in the treatment of malarial fevers) is derived − has a similarly bitter taste, he surmised that the willow might also have therapeutic properties. Stone's interest in willows was due to the ancient "doctrine of signatures" – whereby the cause of a disease offers a clue to its treatment.

According to Stone:

"As this tree delights in a moist or wet soil, where agues chiefly abound, the general maxim that many natural maladies carry their cures along with them or that their remedies lie not far from their causes was so very apposite to this particular case that I could not help applying it [...]."

He experimented by drying a pound of willow bark and creating a powder which he gave to about fifty persons: it was consistently found to be "a powerful astringent and very efficacious in curing agues and intermitting disorders".’ He had discovered salicylic acid, the principal metabolite of aspirin. On 25 April 1763, he sent a letter announcing his discovery to George Parker, 2nd Earl of Macclesfield, President of the Royal Society. The letter survives to this day. On publication, the letter was attributed to "Edmund" Stone, a clerical error that has caused continuing confusion.

A less corrosive compound of salicylic acid, acetylsalicylic acid, produced by reacting sodium salicylate with acetyl chloride, was developed from 1897 by Felix Hoffmann and Arthur Eichengrün. It was marketed by Bayer under the name Aspirin which was registered as a trade name on 23 January 1899.

=== Contribution to the discovery of Aspirin ===
Stone's discovery was not taken up immediately. Jeffreys could only find one doctor in Hertfordshire and one pharmacist in Bath who tried using willow bark as a cure for the ague. The latter described it as cheaper than quinine, but never published any findings about its efficacy. 50 years later, Francesco Fontana described isolating salicin from white willow bark, referencing the work of Stone and Monier. The extraction process was refined by chemist Henri Leroux in 1829, by chemist Raffaele Pirìa in 1838, and in 1859 Hermann Kolbe synthesised salicylic acid directly. The Kolbe-Schmitt Reaction was invented soon after, and one of Kolbe's students opened a factory in Radebeul selling synthetic salicylic acid. In 1897, aspirin was created by scientists at Bayer, allegedly after Felix Hoffman saw his father suffering from the side effects of salicylic acid.

There is controversy over whether the inventors of aspirin were trying to find a version of salicylic acid with fewer side effects. According to Hauke Fürstenwerth, Bayer were instead investigating the properties of a variety of acetylated organic compounds created in the laboratory, as a result of the discovery of acetanilide in the 1880s.

=== Religious ===
In 1732, after giving a university sermon, Stone engaged in a pamphlet controversy with Thomas Chubb. Over 30 years later he published Remarks Upon The History of the Life of Reginald Pole, a book commenting on a work of Thomas Phillips who had published a biography of Cardinal Pole. In 1771, after his death, his son Edward began publishing versions of some of Stone's sermons, as Discourses upon some Important Subjects.

=== Astronomy ===
Stone was interested by the Transit of Venus, 1761. In 1763, he published The whole doctrine of parallaxes explained and illustrated by an arithmetical and geometrical construction of the transit of Venus over the sun, 6 June 1761. It covered material related to the upcoming Transit of Venus of 1769.
