= Theodor Dingermann =

German pharmacist

- Citizenship: German
- Education: University of Erlangen–Nuremberg
- Known for: Editor of Die Pharmazie; President of German Pharmaceutical Society (2000-2004)
- Scientific career
- Doctoral advisor: Helga Kersten

Theodor Dingermann is a German pharmacist. He was professor of pharmaceutical biology at the Goethe University Frankfurt from 1990 to 2013. He specializes in biochemistry and molecular biology. He is the editor of Die Pharmazie.

== Career ==
After completing his training as a pharmacist, Dingermann began studying pharmacy at the University of Erlangen-Nuremberg in 1973. After completing his studies in November 1976, he received his license to practice pharmacy in the same month.

In 1980, Dingermann received his doctorate in the Biochemistry group at the University of Erlangen-Nuremberg under the direction of Helga Kersten, with a dissertation on "Regulatory functions of specific transfer ribonucleic acids in the developmental cycle of the slime mold Dictyostelium discoideum." Following his doctorate, he spent time abroad at Yale University. From 1980 to 1982, he worked as a postdoctoral fellow in Dieter Söll's group on the topic of "Regulatory regions on DNA for RNA polymerase III genes in eukaryotes." From 1982 onward, Dingermann worked as an assistant in the Biochemistry group at the University of Erlangen-Nuremberg, where he led his own research group.

In 1985, Dingermann was appointed Academic Councilor, followed by Senior Academic Councilor in 1990. Throughout his time at the Institute of Physiological Chemistry at the University of Erlangen-Nuremberg, Dingermann taught, in parallel with his research, both the physiological chemistry practical course for physicians and pharmacists and the advanced biochemical practical course (genetic engineering) for natural scientists. In 1987, Dingermann completed his habilitation on the topic of "Transcription Mechanisms of Eukaryotic Transfer of RNA Genes." In 1987, he received his teaching license in the field of biochemistry and molecular biology.

In 1990, Dingermann accepted a C4 professorship at Goethe University Frankfurt and became Managing Director of the Institute of Pharmaceutical Biology in 1991. From 1998 to 2000, he served as Vice President of Goethe University Frankfurt am Main. He declined offers of appointment at the University of Jena (1996) and ETH Zurich (2001). From 2013 to 2017, he was a senior professor at Goethe University Frankfurt, and since 2017, he has been an emeritus professor.

From 2000 to 2004, Dingermann was President of the German Pharmaceutical Society (DPhG), from 2005 to 2012 Biotechnology Representative on the Technology Advisory Board of HA Hessenagentur GmbH, and from 2012 to 2014 Representative for Life Sciences and Biotechnology of the State of Hesse. From 2015 to 2021, Dingermann was Academic Director of the Goethe Business School. He was one of two Academic Program Directors of the Master of Pharma Business Administration program.
