= Felix Hoffmann =

German chemist (1868–1946)

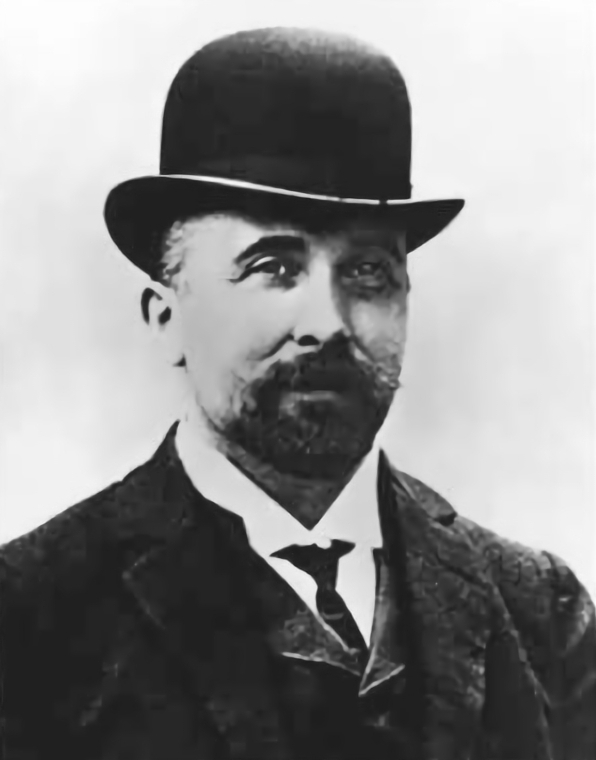
- Born: 21 January 1868; Ludwigsburg, Kingdom of Württemberg
- Died: 3 February 1946 (aged 78); Lausanne, Switzerland
- Education: Ludwig-Maximilians-Universität München
- Scientific career
- Thesis: On certain derivatives of dihydroanthracene (1893)
- Doctoral advisor: Eugen Bamberger

Signature
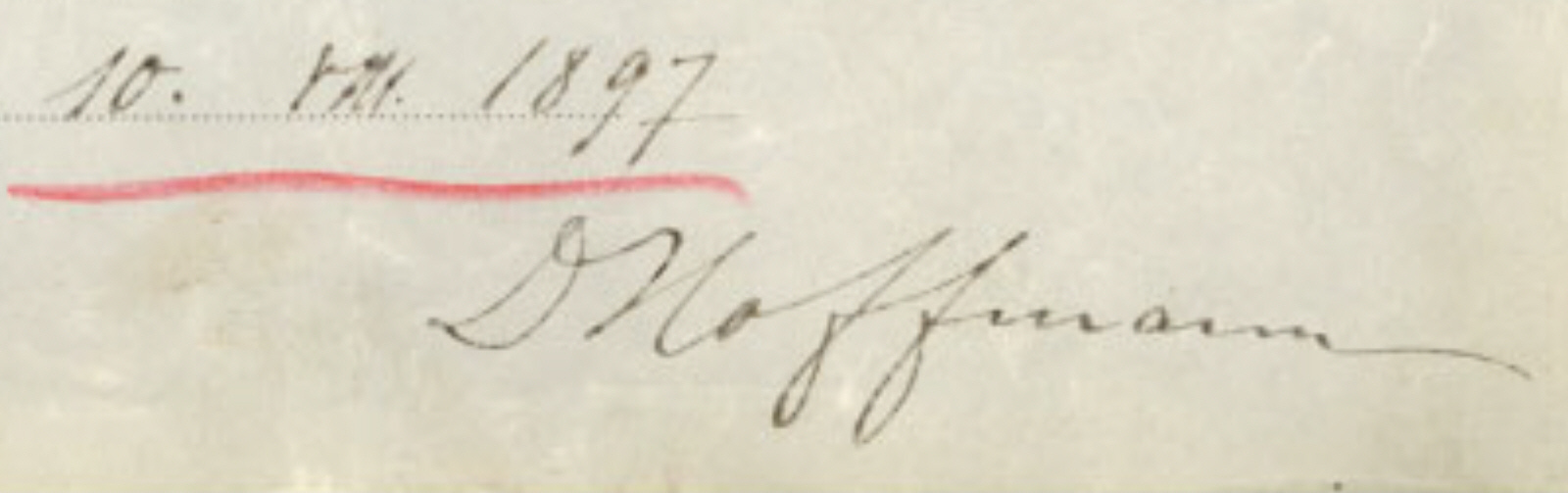

Felix Hoffmann (21 January 1868 – 8 February 1946) was a German chemist notable for re-synthesising diamorphine (independently of C. R. Alder Wright who synthesized it 23 years earlier), which was popularized under the Bayer trade name of "heroin". He is also credited with synthesizing aspirin, though whether he did this under his own initiative or under the instruction of Arthur Eichengrün is contested.

== Career ==
Felix Georg Otto Hoffmann was born on 21 January 1868 in Ludwigsburg, Germany, the son of an industrialist. In 1889, he started studying chemistry at the Ludwig-Maximilians-Universität München to study pharmacy and ended it in 1890 with the pharmaceutical state exam. In 1891, he graduated magna cum laude from the Ludwig-Maximilians-Universität München. Two years later he earned his doctorate, also magna cum laude, after completing his thesis titled "On certain derivatives of dihydroanthracene". In 1894, he joined Bayer as a research chemist.

On 10 August 1897 Hoffmann synthesized acetylsalicylic acid (ASA) while working at Bayer under Arthur Eichengrün. By combining salicylic acid with acetic acid, he succeeded in creating ASA in a chemically pure and stable form. The pharmacologist responsible for verifying these results was skeptical at first, yet once several large-scale studies to investigate the substance's efficacy and tolerability had been completed, it was found to be an analgesic, antipyretic and anti-inflammatory substance. The company then worked to develop a cost-effective production process that would facilitate the promising active ingredient to be supplied as a pharmaceutical product. In 1899, it was marketed for the first time under the trade name "Aspirin", initially as a powder supplied in glass bottles.

He also synthesized diamorphine (heroin), previously achieved by Charles Romley Alder Wright by acetylating different molecules. It was named Heroin due to its "heroic" nature since it was used to medicate a variety of medical illnesses from child coughs to war injuries. It was also used to cure morphine addicts and would result in worse addictions and increasing tolerance levels to the drug over time.

Following the synthesis of aspirin and heroin, Hoffmann moved to the pharmaceutical marketing department where he stayed until his retirement in 1928.

Hoffman was never married and died on 8 February 1946 in Switzerland. He had no known children.

== Aspirin invention controversy ==
Hoffmann first claimed to be the "inventor" of aspirin (as opposed to just the synthesizer) in a footnote to a German encyclopedia published in 1934, saying that his father had complained about the bitter taste of sodium salicylate, the only drug then available to treat rheumatism. The large doses (6–8 grams) of sodium salicylate that were used to treat arthritis commonly irritated the stomach lining and caused patients considerable pain and irritation. He claimed that he began looking for a less acidic formation which led him to synthesize acetylsalicylic acid, a compound that shared the therapeutic properties of other salicylates but not the strong acidity that he believed caused stomach irritations.

An alternative credit for developing aspirin has also been offered. In 1949, ex-Bayer employee Arthur Eichengrün published a paper in Pharmazie, in which he claimed to have planned and directed Hoffman's synthesis of aspirin along with the synthesis of several related compounds. He also claimed to be responsible for aspirin's initial surreptitious clinical testing. Finally, he claimed that Hoffmann's role was restricted to the initial lab synthesis using his (Eichengrün's) process and nothing more. Eichengrün died the same month he published in Pharmazie.

The Eichengrün version was ignored by historians and chemists until 1999, when Walter Sneader of the Department of Pharmaceutical Sciences at the University of Strathclyde in Glasgow re-examined the case and came to the conclusion that indeed Eichengrün's account was convincing and correct and that Eichengrün deserved credit for the invention of aspirin. Bayer denied this in a press release, asserting that the invention of aspirin was due to Hoffmann.

== Legacy ==
In 2002, he was inducted into the US National Inventors Hall of Fame.
