= Silver proteinate =

Silver proteinate (brand name: Protargol) is used in electron microscopy with periodic acid and thiocarbohydrazide or thiosemicarbohydrazide as a positive stain for carbohydrates such as glycogen. It can also be used for light microscopy to stain nerve tissue. It is normally available as 8% silver in combination with albumin.

Staining ciliates with silver proteinate can reveal the infraciliature, an important character for identification of ciliates. Hundreds of ciliate species have been discovered using Protargol staining.

Because of its bactericidal properties it was used to treat gonorrhea before the discovery of antibiotics. The inventor of the first silver protein formulation was Arthur Eichengrün, a German chemist working for Bayer. It was introduced for therapeutic use in 1897.

== See also ==
- Medical uses of silver
