= Charles Romley Alder Wright =

English chemistry and physics researcher (1844–1894)

Charles Romley Alder Wright FCS FRS
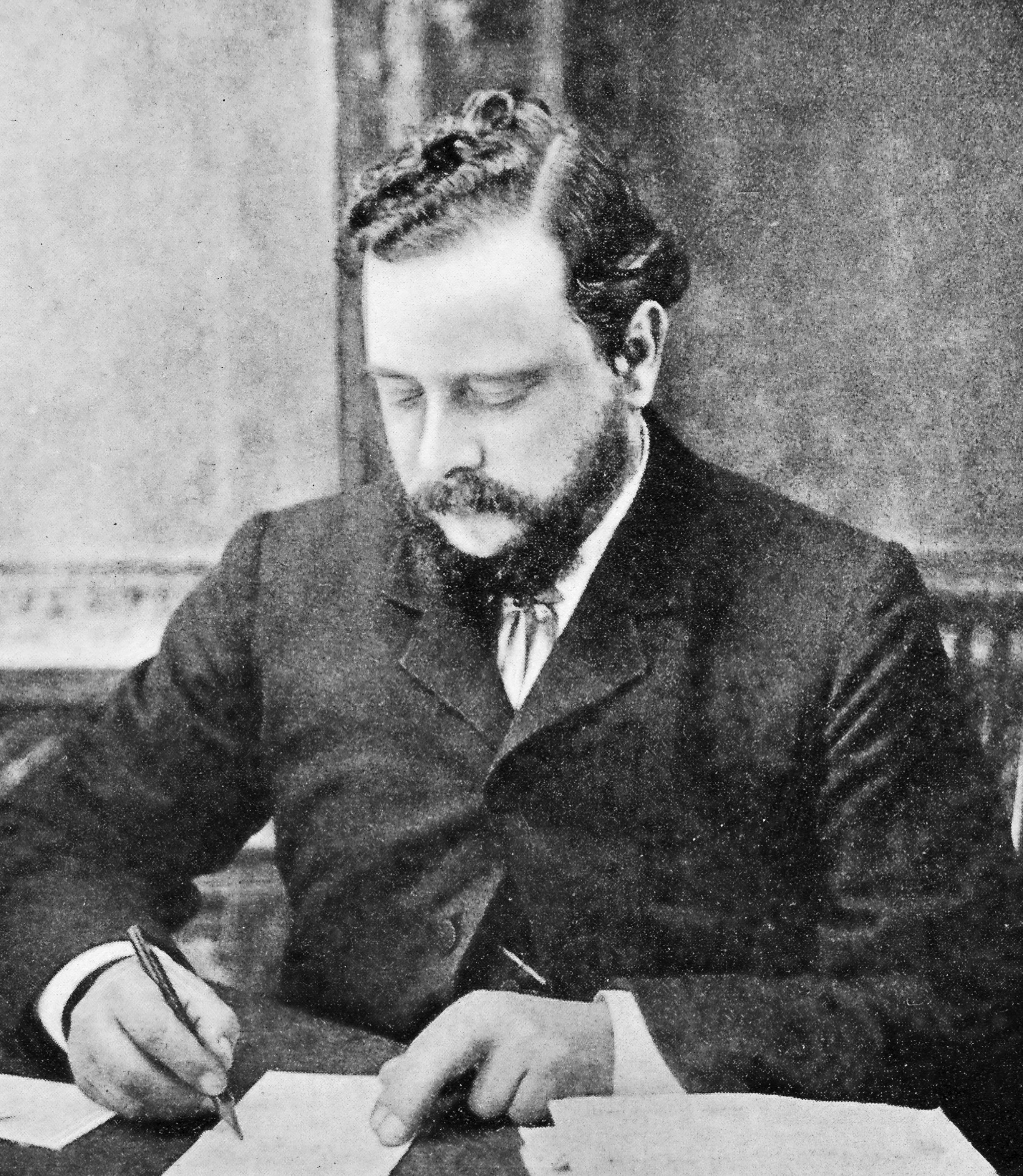
- C. R. Alder Wright, c. 1875
- Born: 7 September 1844; Southend, Essex, England
- Died: 25 June 1894 (aged 49)
- Known for: Opioid synthesis, aluminium antimonide
- Scientific career
- Workplaces: St Mary's Hospital (London)

Charles Romley Alder Wright (7 September 1844 – 25 June 1894) was an English lecturer in chemistry and physics at St Mary's Hospital Medical School in London, England. He was a founder of the Royal Institute of Chemistry.

Alder Wright developed hundreds of new opiate compounds and was the first person to synthesize diamorphine (heroin), in 1874. He also discovered aluminium antimonide.

In addition to research papers on a wide variety of topics, Wright published several books, including one to interest young readers in The Threshold of Science: a Variety of Simple and Amusing Experiments.

== Biography ==
Wright was born in Southend, Essex on 7 September 1844, to Romley Wright and Elizabeth Alder. From boyhood he suffered from a painful disease of the hip, which caused him to be lame. He received his early education from his father, a civil engineer.

Alder Wright attended Owens College, Manchester from 1861 to 1865, graduating with his BSc in 1865. As a student, Wright worked as an assistant to Henry Roscoe, doing early research on vanadium. Wright's first published paper was on the "Action of Light on Sensitive Photographic Papers". It appeared in the Journal of the Chemical Society in February 1866.

Wright was employed by the Weston works of the Runcorn Soap and Alkali Company during 1866–1867. He then moved to London where he worked with Albert James Bernays at St. Thomas's Hospital; with Augustus Matthiessen of St Mary's Hospital and St Bartholomew's Hospital; and with Sir Lowthian Bell. He earned his DSc (Lond) in 1870. During this time he published on alkali manufacturing, on opium alkaloids and the discovery of morphine, and on iron smelting. In 1871, Wright was appointed as a lecturer in chemistry and physics researcher at St Mary's Hospital Medical School in London, England.

He was a founding member of the Royal Institute of Chemistry of Great Britain and Ireland. He served as its first treasurer from 1877 to 1884 and was instrumental in the establishment of the institute.

In 1881, Wright was elected as a Fellow of the Royal Society (FRS). He also acted as an Examiner for the University of Durham and the Royal College of Physicians and the City and Guilds of London. The Philadelphia College of Pharmacy elected him as a corresponding member in 1893.

Wright died from complications due to diabetes mellitus on 25 June 1894, at forty-nine years of age. He was described in one obituary as "an ardent and thorough investigator in the field of chemical and physical science." At the Annual General Meeting of March 27, 1895, President Henry Edward Armstrong of the Chemical Society of London lamented his loss:

"We must especially regret the decease of one of these, Dr Alder Wright, at so early an age; men gifted with so much originality and versatility and with such extraordinary powers of work, are at all times rare, and we can ill afford to lose them."

== Scientific contributions ==
Wright was extremely versatile, having initially considered and trained for a profession in engineering. This allowed him to make diverse contributions to the chemical field.

=== Diamorphine ===
In quest of a non-addictive alternative to morphine, Wright experimented with combining morphine with various acids. He boiled anhydrous morphine alkaloid with acetic anhydride over a stove for several hours and produced a more potent, acetylated form of morphine, now called diamorphine (or diacetylmorphine), also known as heroin.

After Wright's death, Heinrich Dreser, a chemist at Bayer Laboratories, continued to test heroin. Bayer marketed it as an analgesic and 'sedative for coughs' in 1898. When its addictive potential was recognized, Bayer ceased its production in 1913.

=== AlSb, aluminium antimonide ===
In 1892, Wright was the first to report the existence of the stoichiometric intermetallic compound AlSb (aluminium antimonide), which is now recognized as a compound semiconductor with potential use in high-frequency, low-power consumption microelectronics applications, as well as gamma radiation detection.

=== Other contributions ===
In addition to his researches in organic chemistry, Wright published works on numerous topics including soap, photographic and waterproof papers, canvas goods, insulating materials, disinfectants, metallurgy, iron smelting, manganese dioxide, ternary alloys and chemical dynamics.

== Bibliography ==
- Wright, C R A, Metals and their chief industrial applications. Being, with some considerable additions, the substance of a course of lectures delivered at the Royal institution of Great Britain in 1877. London, Macmillan and co., 1878.
- Wright, C R A, The Threshold of Science: a Variety of Simple and Amusing Experiments, Charles Griffin, London 1891.
- Wright, C R A, Animal and Vegetable Fixed-oils, Fats, Butters and Waxes: Their Preparation and Properties, Charles Griffin, London 1894.
- Wright, C R A, J. Soc. Chem. Ind. 11, 492 (1892).
