= Thiocarbohydrazide =

Names
- Preferred IUPAC name Hydrazinecarbothiohydrazide
- Other names 1,3-Diamino-2-thiourea; Thiocarbazide; Thiocarbonic dihydrazide; Thiocarbonyldihydrazide; Carbonothioic dihydrazide; TCh; Thiocarbonohydrazide

Identifiers
CAS Number	2231-57-4
3D model (JSmol)	Interactive image
ChemSpider	2006346
ECHA InfoCard	100.017.064
PubChem CID	2724189
UNII	1IZ2H82NWU
CompTox Dashboard (EPA)	DTXSID7027461
- InChI: InChI=1S/CH6N4S/c2-4-1(6)5-3/h2-3H2,(H2,4,5,6) Key: LJTFFORYSFGNCT-UHFFFAOYSA-N; InChI=1/CH6N4S/c2-4-1(6)5-3/h2-3H2,(H2,4,5,6) Key: LJTFFORYSFGNCT-UHFFFAOYAM
- SMILES: C(=S)(NN)NN

Properties
Chemical formula	CH_{6}N_{4}S
Molar mass	106.15 g·mol^{−1}
Melting point	171 to 174 °C (340 to 345 °F; 444 to 447 K) (decomposes)
- Except where otherwise noted, data are given for materials in their standard state (at 25 °C [77 °F], 100 kPa). Infobox references

Thiocarbohydrazide is a toxic compound made by the reaction of carbon disulfide with hydrazine (hydrazinolysis). It is used in the silver proteinate specific staining of carbohydrates in electron microscopy.
