= Heinrich Dreser =

German chemist (1860–1924)

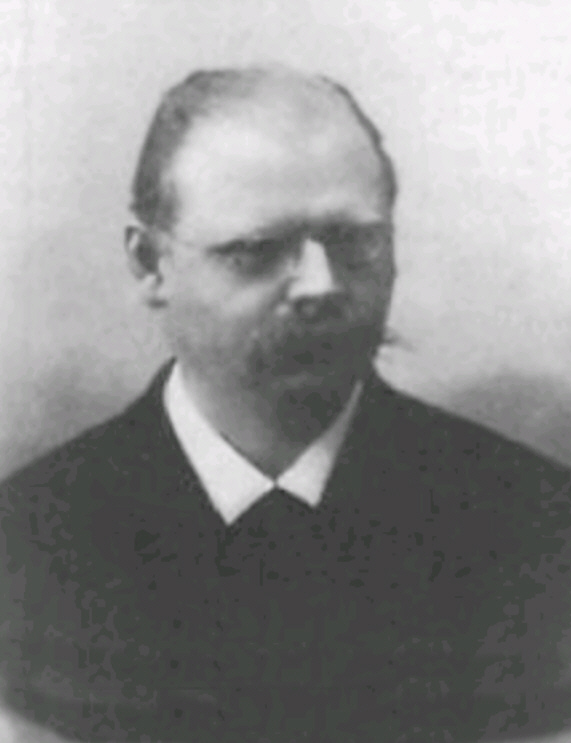
Heinrich Dreser, 1897

Heinrich Dreser (1 October 1860 – 21 December 1924) was a German chemist responsible for the aspirin and heroin projects at Bayer AG. He was also a key figure in creating the widely used modern drug codeine. Dreser was born in Darmstadt, Grand Duchy of Hesse.

Arthur Eichengrün made the claim, yet unproven, that credit for the discovery of aspirin were stolen from him by Dreser.
