= Minerva Medica =

- Discipline: Internal medicine
- Language: English, Italian
- Edited by: M. L. Benzo

Publication details
- History: 1909-present
- Publisher: Edizioni Minerva Medica
- Frequency: Bimonthly
- Impact factor: 1.202 (2013)

Standard abbreviations
- ISO 4: Minerva Med.

Indexing
- CODEN: MIMEAO
- ISSN: 0026-4806 (print); 1827-1669 (web)
- OCLC no.: 801136561

Links
- Journal homepage; Online access; Online archive

Minerva Medica is a bimonthly peer-reviewed medical journal published in English and Italian. It was established in 1909 and is published by Edizioni Minerva Medica. The editor-in-chief is M. L. Benzo. In 1970 it absorbed Minerva Medica Siciliana.

== Abstracting and indexing ==
The journal is abstracted and indexed in:

- Abstracts in Anthropology
- Chemical Abstracts
- Current Contents/Clinical Medicine
- Embase
- Index Medicus/MEDLINE/PubMed
- Reactions Weekly
- Referativnyi Zhurnal
- Science Citation Index Expanded
- Scopus

According to the Journal Citation Reports, the journal has a 2013 impact factor of 1.202, ranking it 83rd out of 156 journals in the category "Medicine, General & Internal".

== History ==
The journal was established in 1909, but publication was suspended for 1920. From 1921 to 1929 volumes were numbered as a new series from 1 to 9 but constitute, in fact, volumes 12 to 20. In 1970 Minerva Medica absorbed Minerva Medica Siciliana, previously titled Gazzetta Medica Siciliana, which was established in 1869. The absorbed publication continues as a supplement with its own numbering.
