= Raffaele Piria =

Italian chemist (1814–1865)

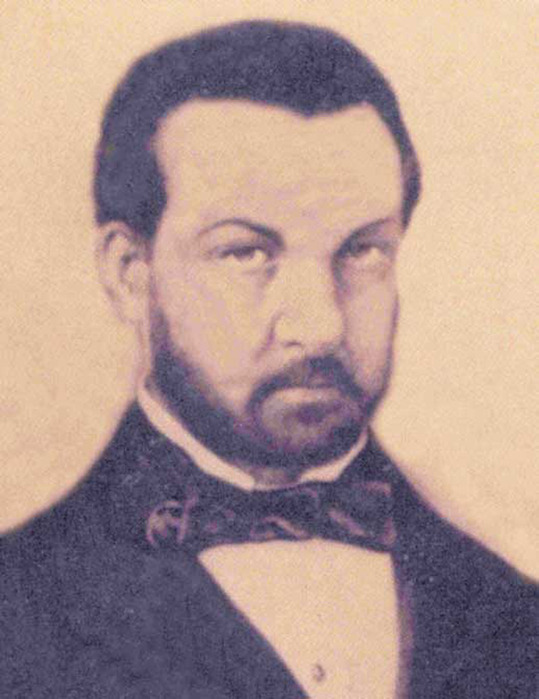
Raffaele Piria

Raffaele Piria (20 August 1814 in Scilla – 18 July 1865 in Turin) was an Italian chemist from Scilla, who lived in Palmi. He converted the substance Salicin into a sugar and a second component, which on oxidation becomes salicylic acid, a major component of the analgesic drug Aspirin (acetylsalicylic acid). Other reactions discovered by Piria were the conversion of aspartic acid to malic acid by action of nitrogen dioxide, and the reaction of aromatic nitro compounds with sulfite towards aminosulfonic acids.
