= Die Pharmazie =

- Discipline: Pharmacy
- Language: English
- Edited by: Walter E. Müller and Hirofumi Takeuchi

Publication details
- History: 1946–present
- Publisher: IMR Press
- Frequency: Monthly
- Open access: Yes

Standard abbreviations
- ISO 4: Pharmazie

Indexing
- ISSN: 0031-7144 (print); 3053-691X (web)
- OCLC no.: 01779245

Links
- Journal homepage

Die Pharmazie is a monthly academic journal focusing on pharmaceutical sciences. It was originally published in Berlin by Verlag Dr. W. Saenger in German in 1946. It is now published by IMR Press. Since 2019, it has no longer been published in print. The editors-in-chief are Walter E. Müller and Hirofumi Takeuchi.

== Abstracting and indexing ==
The journal is abstracted and indexed in:

- Science Citation Index Expanded (SCIE)
- MEDLINE/PubMed
- China National Knowledge Infrastructure (CNKI)
